= List of kings in Wales from the Matter of Britain =

Legendary rulers of Welsh kingdoms

The names of rulers in present-day Wales found in the Matter of Britain are primarily derived from Geoffrey of Monmouth's Historia Regum Britanniae. Written about 1136, this is a pseudohistorical account of British history, drawn largely from Geoffrey's vivid imagination, though also including some elements which were taken from older sources, such as the Historia Brittonum. It includes the names of many rulers, some of whom are based on real people, though the stories that Geoffrey told about them are wildly inaccurate. Geoffrey's fictions were accepted as historical truth, and became the centrepiece of the Matter of Britain, a cycle of frequently reworked medieval tales.

In the Historia Regum Britanniae, Geoffrey initially defines Wales as one kingdom, Cambria, which he claims to be named after its first king, Brutus of Troy's son Camber. Only one more king of Cambria is named in the Historia: Rudaucus, several generations later. Though the term Cambria, referring to the entirety of Wales, is occasionally used later in the book, it is divided into two kingdoms: Venedotia, defined by Geoffrey as North Wales, and Demetia, defined as South Wales. These are the historical Latin names of the kingdoms of Gwynedd and Dyfed respectively, though in reality they were only two of several Welsh kingdoms.

Variations of Geoffrey's Historia were used to dignify the genealogies of many Welsh princes, nobles, and gentry. Known examples include Gruffudd ap Cynan. In the early 15th century, Owain Glyndŵr claimed the title Prince of Wales as a direct descendant and heir of King Camber, and also of the real medieval king Cadwaladr. In 1607, the Welsh genealogist John Williams recorded the claimed genealogies of some Welsh gentry families in his Book of Baglan. The more distant "ancestors" in these lineages vary between families, but they depend heavily on Geoffrey's fictions.

In his Welsh Classical Dictionary of 1993, Peter Bartrum collates names of these legendary (and real) rulers. He supplies dates for them, appropriate for their fictitious existence. These legendary dates are of no independent historical significance.

== Kings of Cambria ==
Name	Notes	Sources
Camber	Son of Brutus of Britain; became king of Cambria, while his brothers Locrinus and Albanactus became kings of Loegria and Alba respectively; fought alongside Locrinus against Humber the Hun	Historia Regum Britanniae
Rudaucus	King of Cambria after the death of Porrex I; killed fighting alongside Staterius of Alba against Dunvallo Molmutius of Cornwall	Historia Regum Britanniae

== Kings of Venedotia ==
Name	Notes	Sources
Guerthaeth	King of Venedotia under King Cassibelanus of Britain; fought against Julius Caesar's second invasion of Britain	Historia Regum Britanniae
Peredurus	King of Venedotia; fought against Guennolous of Scotia, and was supported in this war by Merlin of Demetia and Rodarchus of Cumbria	Vita Merlini
Cadwallo Lewirh	King of the Venedotians; attended the coronation of King Arthur	Historia Regum Britanniae
Malgo	King of the Venedotians under King Constantine of Britain; had Saint David buried at St Davids Cathedral; became King of Britain, and annexed Ireland, Iceland, Götaland, the Orkneys, Norway, and Dacia	Historia Regum Britanniae
Cadwan	King of the Venedotians at the time Augustine of Canterbury arrived in Britain; became king of the Britons, and reached an agreement with Æthelfrith that the Saxons would rule only north of the Humber; father of Cadwalla and raised Edwin of Northumbria	Historia Regum Britanniae

== Kings of Demetia ==
Name	Notes	Sources
Britael	King of Demetia under King Cassibelanus of Britain; fought against Julius Caesar's second invasion of Britain	Historia Regum Britanniae
Gloius	Son of the Emperor Claudius; possible namesake of Gloucester; became duke of Demetia after the death of Arviragus	Historia Regum Britanniae
Grandfather of Merlin	King of Demetia; his daughter was the mother of Merlin; unnamed in the Historia, but later sources call him Conaan, Melias, or Merlin	Historia Regum Britanniae; Brut Chronicle; Les Fils du Roi Constant; Prose Merlin
Merlin	Became king and prophet of Demetia; gave laws to Demetia; fought alongside Peredurus of Venedotia and Rodarchus of Cumbria against Guennolous of Scotia	Vita Merlini
Sater	King of the Demetians; attended the coronation of King Arthur	Historia Regum Britanniae
Margaduc	King of the Demetians at the time Augustine of Canterbury arrived in Britain; agreed to make King Cadwan of Venedotia king of the Britons	Historia Regum Britanniae
Margadud	King of the Demetians; close friend and advisor of King Cadwalla of Britain	Historia Regum Britanniae

== See also ==
- List of legendary kings of Britain
- List of legendary rulers of Cornwall
- List of High Kings of Ireland
- Legendary kings of Scotland
