= Hafren =

Welsh mythological princess

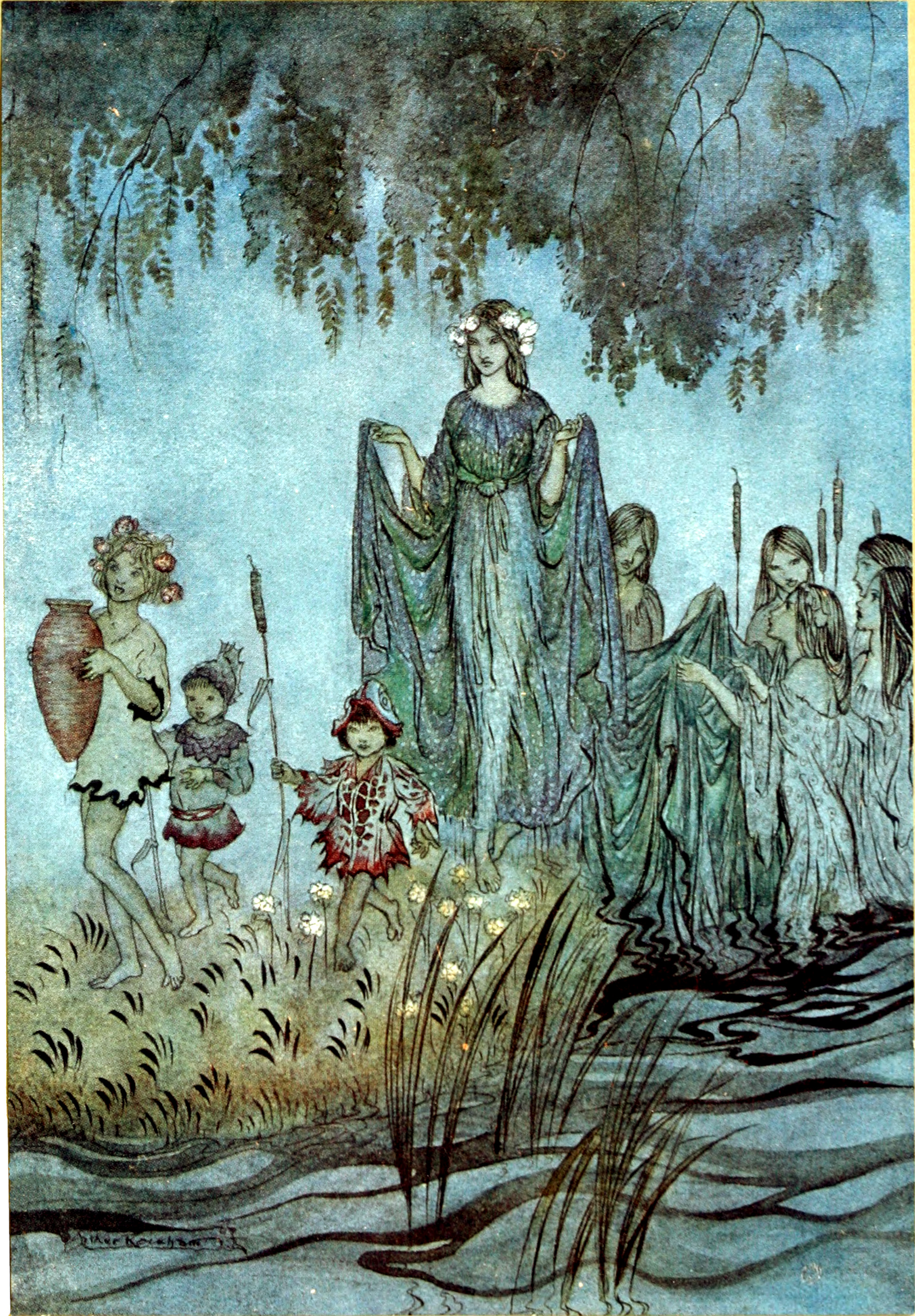
An illustration by Arthur Rackham of Hafren emerging from the water, inspired by her appearance in Milton's Comus

Hafren (Old Welsh: Habren, Latin: Sabrina) is a legendary princess and Goddess in Welsh mythology. The earliest version of her story appears circa. 1136 in Geoffrey of Monmouth's Historia Regum Britanniae, where "Princess Habren" is drowned by her repudiated stepmother Gwendolen, with the river (Hafren) being subsequently named for her. Later folklore, literature and artworks have reinterpreted this story, most notably by John Milton in his 1634 masque Comus.

== Welsh legends ==
The name has been extant since at least the 2nd century AD, when it was recorded in its Latinised form Sabrina, making the name one of the earliest recorded in the British Isles. The name appears under its Latin variant Sabrinae in the 6th-century polemic, De Excidio et Conquestu Britanniae by the British monk, Gildas, and in its Old Welsh form, Habren (c. 800). Despite these records, no writing on Hafren as a Princess or Goddess is recorded until after the Norman invasion of Wales, and the writings of Geoffrey of Monmouth (c. 1138).

=== Historia Regum Britanniae ===
Geoffrey dedicates his work, Historia Regum Britanniae to Walter of Oxford, who he claims gave him a "certain very ancient book written in the British language" from which he copied his tales, (possibly the Brut Tysilio). Despite writing in Latin, Geoffrey does indeed use the Old Welsh form, Habren and describes her as the beautiful daughter of an illicit affair.

Geoffrey's version of the story takes place during the turmoil that followed the death of Brutus of Troy the first King of the Britons. Humber the Hun invades Lloegyr from Germania but meets resistance led by Brutus' eldest son, Locrin. During the struggle, Locrinus uncovers the captive Germanic princess Estrildis in one of Humber's ships and falls in love, despite being betrothed to the daughter of King Corineus of Cornwall, Gwendolen in a forced diplomatic marriage. Eventually Locrin defeats the invading forces and is declared the new king of Lloegyr. He honours his commitment to Corineus, but continues a secret love affair with Estrildis, for whom he has builds palatial apartments secreted in a cave underground. It is from this affair, that Estrildis gives birth to a most beautiful daughter; Hafren.

Sometime after the death of Corineus, Locrin divorces Gwendolen and marries Estrildis, making her his queen and legitimising Hafren. In response, Gwendolen returns to Cornwall and raises a huge army of all the forces available to her in Civil War. Eventually, the armies of Gwendolen and Locrin meet in battle near the River Stour where Locrin is killed by a single arrow and Gwendolen is declared Queen in her own right. Finally, the furious Queen orders that both Estrildis and her innocent daughter Habren are to be drowned in the river:

(Gwendolen) ordered Estrildis and her daughter Habren to be thrown into the river now called the Severn, and issued instructions throughout Britain that the river should be named after the girl; she wanted Habren to enjoy immortality since her own husband had been the girl's father. Hence the river is called Habren in British even today, although in the other tongue this has been corrupted to Severn.

=== The Caersws legend ===
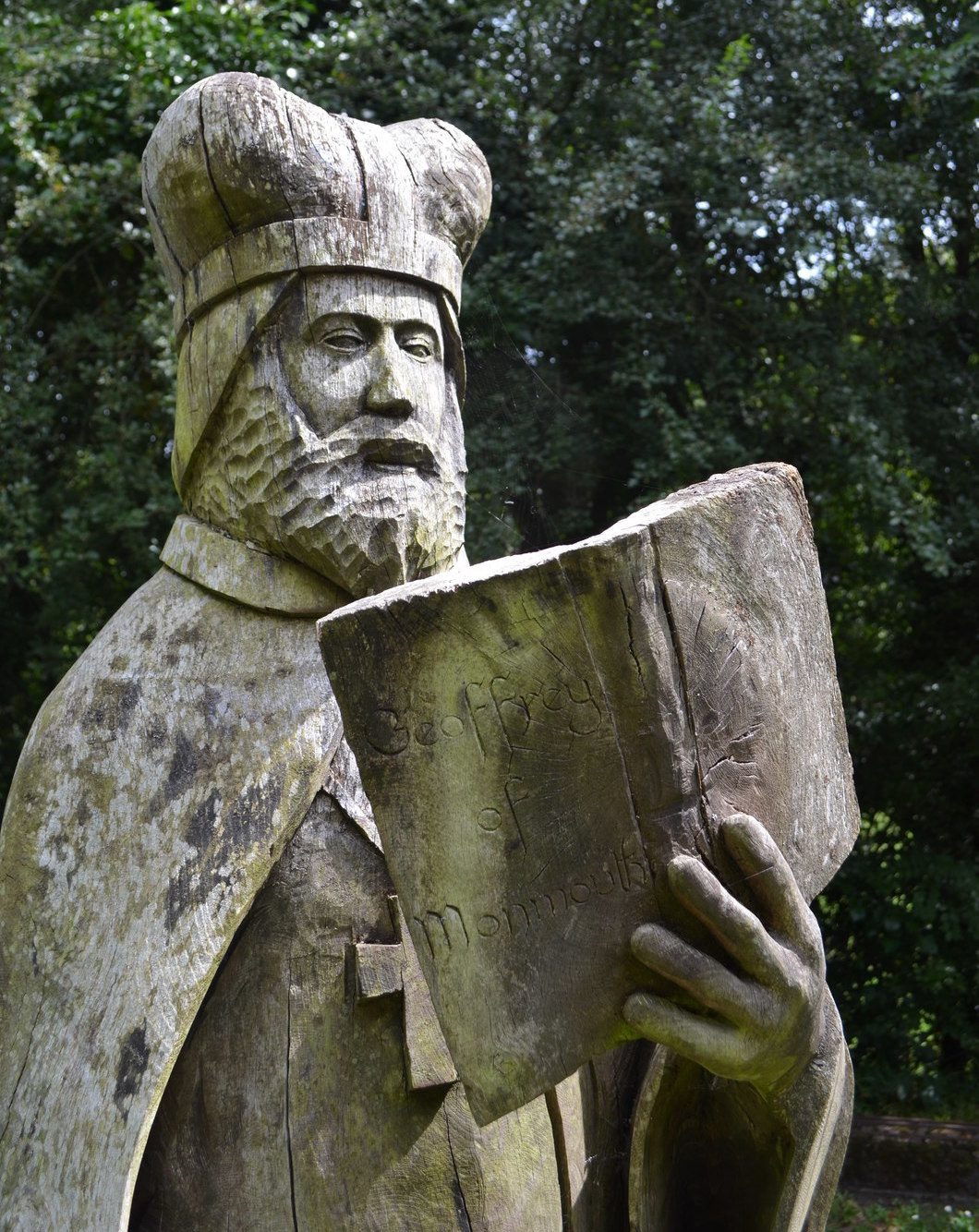
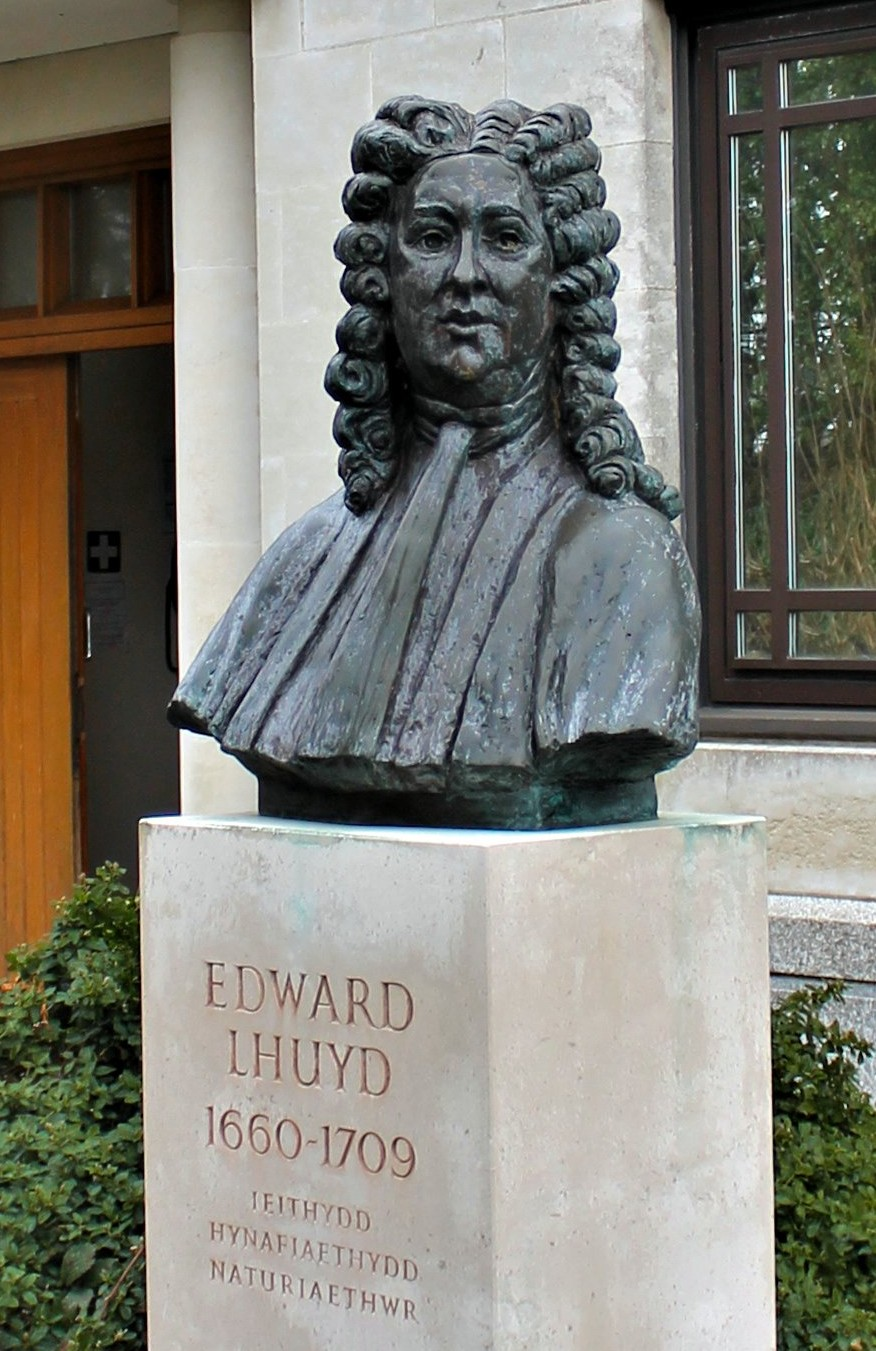
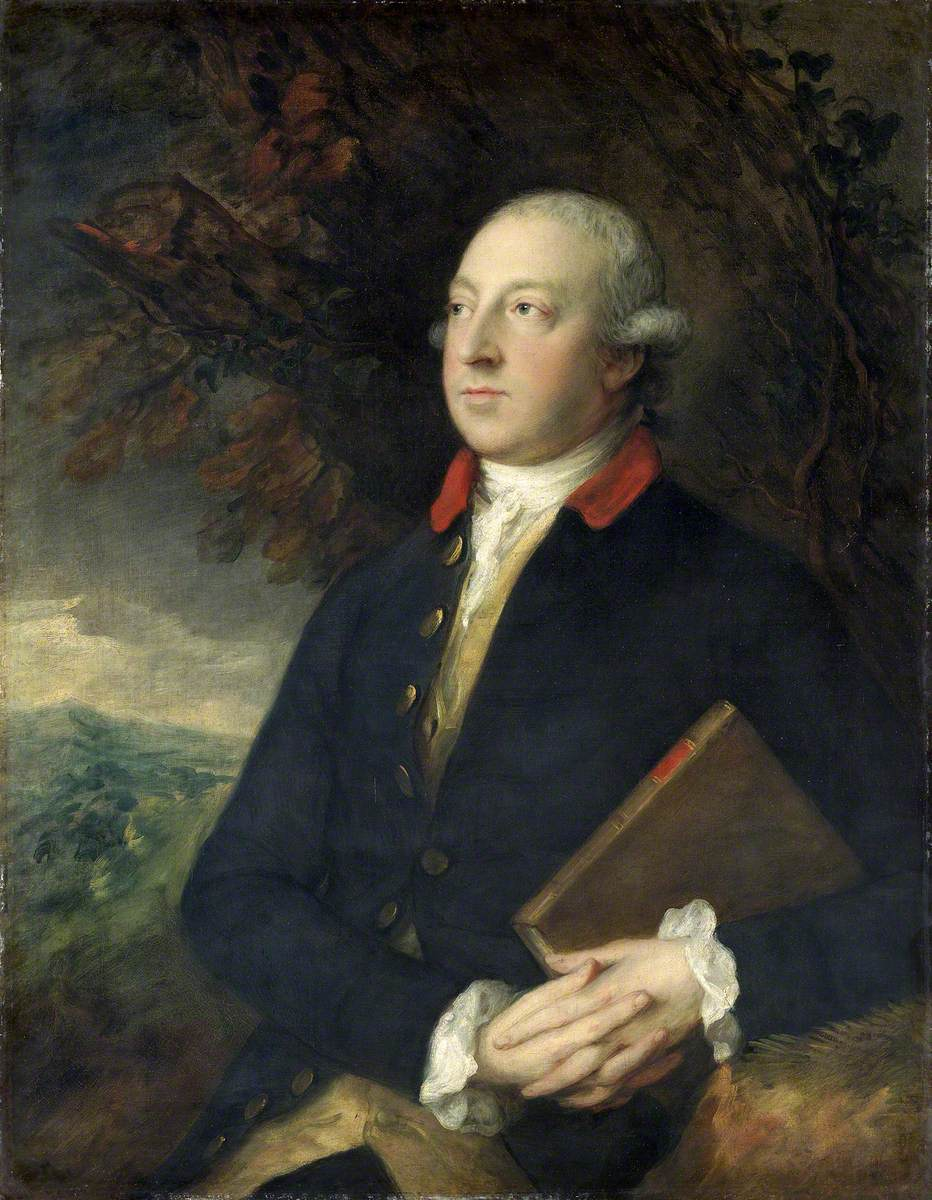
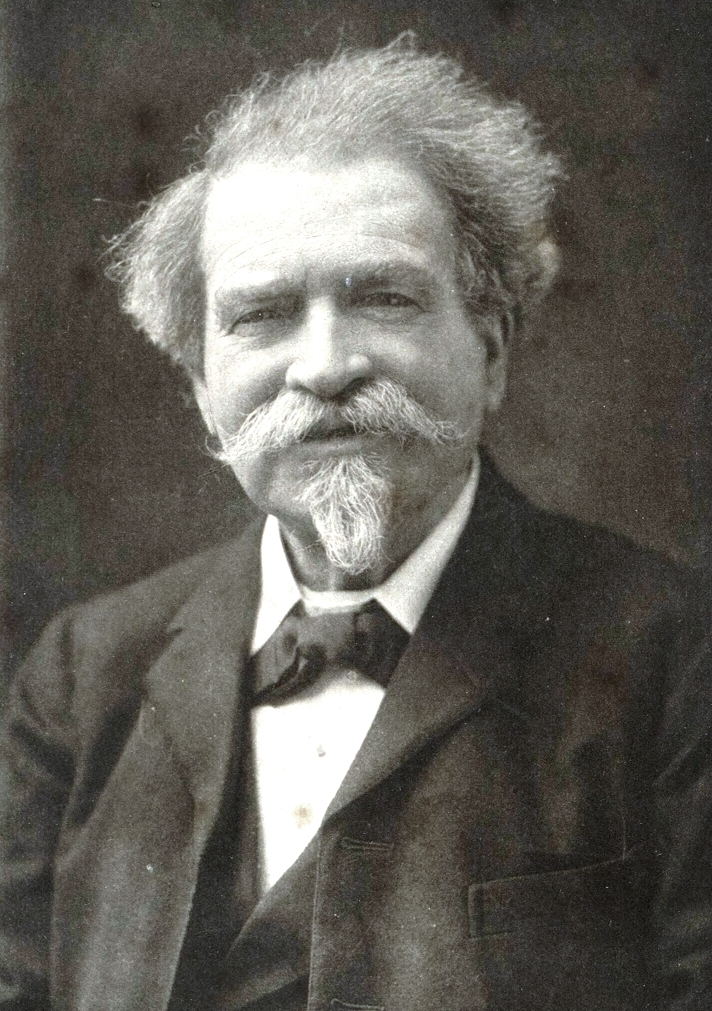
Enigmatic legends associated with Hafren have been a popular subject for Welsh writers throughout the centuries. (l-r) Geoffrey of Monmouth, Edward Lhuyd, Thomas Pennant and John Rhŷs all claimed that their Hafren stories were based on older manuscripts or oral traditions that are otherwise unrecorded.

Variations on this story have been recorded by Welsh authors for centuries. In 1616, Oliver Mathews' writes that the Britons name Hafren's mother as Queen Sŵs-wên ("The Blessed/Pure Kiss") and that Locrinus did not keep her in a cave, but built a new city for her at Caersws in Cambria (c. 1086 BC). Following Locrinus' divorce of Gwendolen, the two live in the city as King and Queen with their daughter, for whom Mathews records two names "Haverwen or Havfren".

However, the tale still ends in vengeance and death. Gwendolen raises an army to defeat Locrinus who is killed in the battle. She then moves on to Caersws where she kills both Sŵs-wên and her daughter. Gwendolen then orders that the new city be razed to the ground and that the bodies of the two women be cast into the river that passes by the city, which the Britons name "Haverne" in honour of the innocent Princess.

A similar version of this tale is recorded by Edward Lhuyd in book three of his Parochialia. Lhuyd claims that he had viewed an ancient manuscript that named Locrinus' mistress as Sŵs-wên, and that she had actually been the wife of Humber the Hun rather than a hostage. In this version, Locrinus again builds the city of Caersŵs and Hafren is again killed by Gwendolen. The Queen Sŵs-wên version is again repeated by the naturalist and antiquarian Thomas Pennant in the early 18th century. However, Pennant notes that in local Welsh folklore Hafren was drowned near Dolforwyn Castle; and that the castle's name Dôl-forwyn literally translate as the "maiden's meadow". As such he postulated that Hafren was the titular "maiden" and that the place of here drowning was in the stretch of the river that the castle overlooks.

=== The British Kymry ===
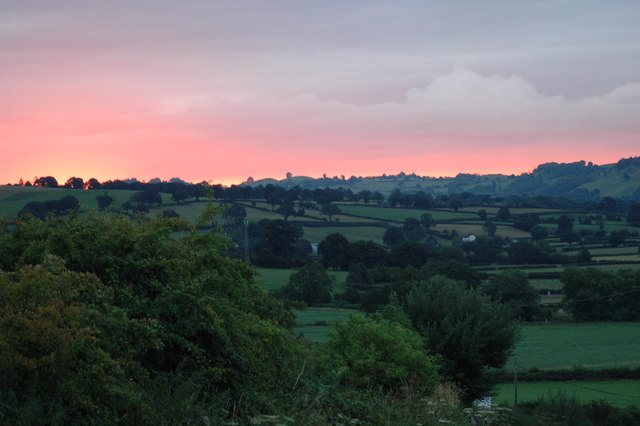
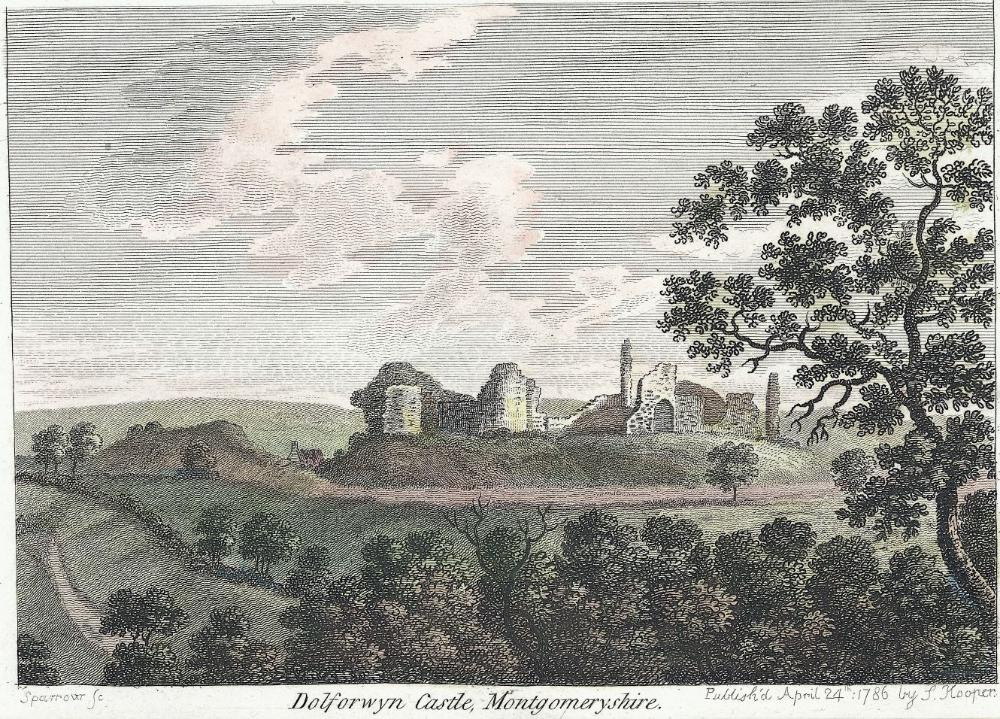
Some Welsh legends associate Princess Hafren with an ancient city destroyed by Queen Gwendolen at Caersws (left). Thomas Pennant also recorded that local folklore recalled that Hafren was drowned near Dolforwyn Castle (right), a name which translates as the "maiden's meadow". This version of the Hafren legend would influence later writers, such as Richard Williams Morgan

Richard Williams Morgan drew on the previous two stories, and expanded them in The British Kymry (1857). In it, Locrinus builds a palace for Estrildis (who Morgan says was also known as Susa) at Caersws, where he concealed her for seven years with the help of his brother Camber. Hafren (called Sabra) is born, and is even more beautiful than Estrildis, rivalling her ancestor Venus (Locrinus was a descendant of Venus' son Aeneas). When Corineus dies, Gwendolen's army fights Locrinus' forces at the River Stour, and after killing him she hurries to Caersws and seizes Estrildis and Sabra. She orders Estrildis to be killed immediately, but was "so moved by the supernatural loveliness of Sabra, that many days elapsed before she could be persuaded to condemn her to death". Sabra was then taken to a meadow (Dôl-forwyn, 'the maiden's meadow') by Gwendolen's guards, and cast into the River Severn.

=== Three Daughters of Plynlimon ===
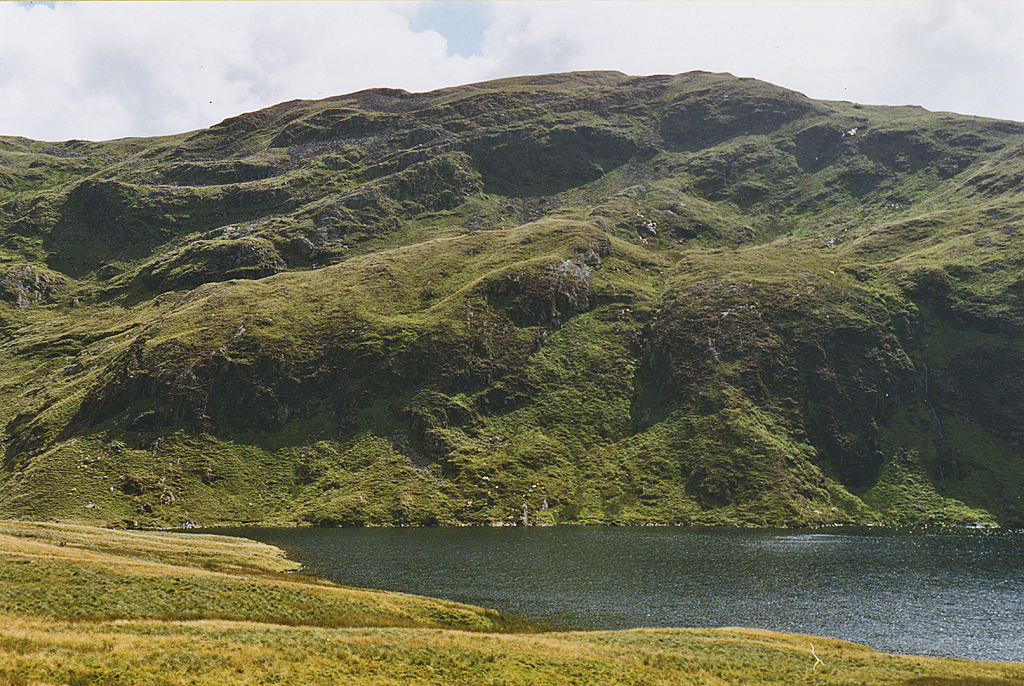
"Father Plynlimon", the mountain from which "the three sisters", Hafren, Rheidolyn and Gwy make their way to the sea

The Folklorist John Rhŷs recorded an unconnected legend involving a mythological Hafren as a personification of the river. Rhys states that the legend was told to him in his youth in 1840s Ceredigion, but gives no information on the age or provenance of the story. In the legend, Hafren and her two sisters, Rheidolyn and Gwy each rise from "Father Plynlimon" (the mountain upon which the three rivers have their sources), with each sister choosing a different direction to make their way to the sea.

The legend was retold throughout the 19th and 20th centuries, with Arthur Granville Bradley giving a detailed version and analysis in 1920. Bradley states that the god of the mountain was indeed, father to three daughters named Hafren, Gwy and Rheidolyn. However in this version, each daughter is given a single day to reach the sea, with their father promising all the territory they can cover before dark as a dowery. In this version, Hafren is the keenest of the sisters, rising first and heading east, taking what is the longer but easiest route to the sea. As such, she is given the most fertile country.

== In English literature and art ==
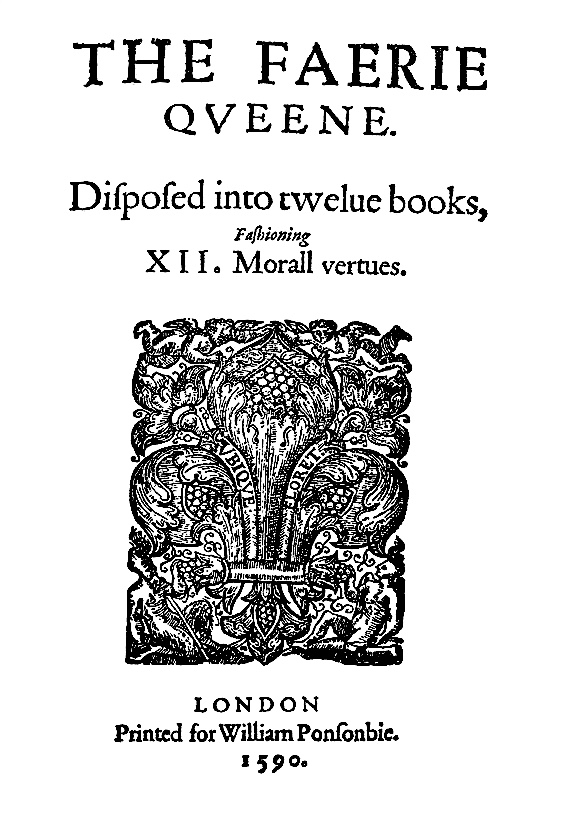
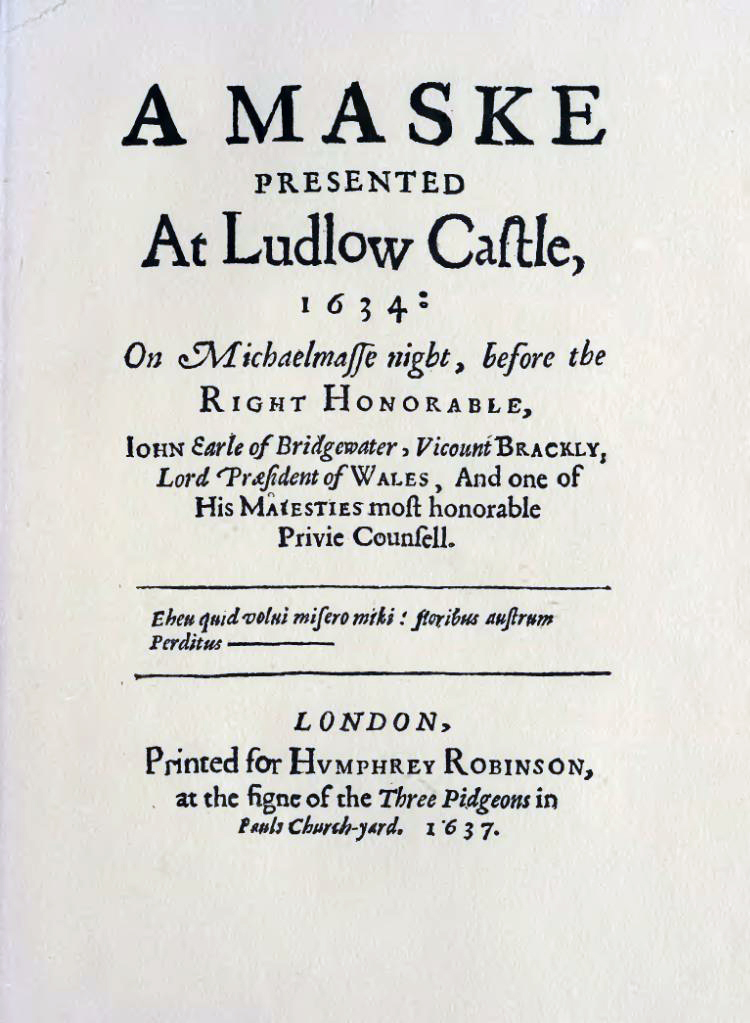
Edmund Spenser's poem The Faerie Queene (1590) and John Milton's Comus, both feature a water nymph named Sabrina, based on the Hafren legend

Hafren appears in book 2, canto 10 of Edmund Spenser's epic poem The Faerie Queene (1590). Spenser reiterates much of the matter of Britain and the House of Brutus from earlier Welsh and Norman sources. Spenser's work refers to Hafren by her Latin name "Sabrina" and retells the tale of Estrild and Sabrina fleeing Guendolene, who catches them at the Severn, killing Estrild, but casting "the faire Sabrina almost dead with feare" into the river to drown.

"Whilom she was the daughter of Locrine, That had the sceptre from his father Brute. She, guiltless damsel, flying the mad pursuit Of her enragéd stepdame, Guendolen, Commended her fair innocence to the flood That stayed her flight with his cross-flowing course.

The water-nymphs, that in the bottom played, Held up their pearled wrists, and took her in, Bearing her straight to aged Nereus' hall; Who, piteous of her woes, reared her lank head, And gave her to his daughters to imbathe In nectared lavers strewed with asphodel, And through the porch and inlet of each sense Dropt in ambrosial oils, till she revived, And underwent a quick immortal change, Made Goddess of the river."

— John Milton's version of the Hafren story in his masque Comus, 1634.

=== Milton's Comus ===
Hafren is also a central character in John Milton's 1634 masque Comus, which was written and performed for the appointment of the new Lord President of Wales, John Egerton. Milton casts her as the ultimate saviour of the virtuous captive "The Lady" whose desperate brothers recall the tale of Sabrina and her transformation into a Goddess before imploring her to emerge from the Severn. Even with the help from "The Attendant Spirit" (representing heaven itself), the rescuers are unable to free The Lady and the drama is only resolved once the river deity rises from the waters "with printless feet" and singing her words. She recognises The Lady's virtue and frees her by applying a magic elixir, "Drops that from my fountain pure, I have kept of precious cure." finally freeing her from her bounds.

Milton's work would go on to inspire many later English artists, such as William Blake's 1821 engraving "Sabrina's Silvery Flood" commissioned by Robert John Thornton for his edition of The Pastorals of Virgil.

Another notable artwork inspired by Milton is Samuel Palmer's 1856 watercolour "Sabrina". Palmer's work took Milton's subject and setting near Mount Plynlimon, in mid-Wales near the source of the river. The painting is now part of the Collection at the New York Met Gallery.

== Fountains and statuary ==
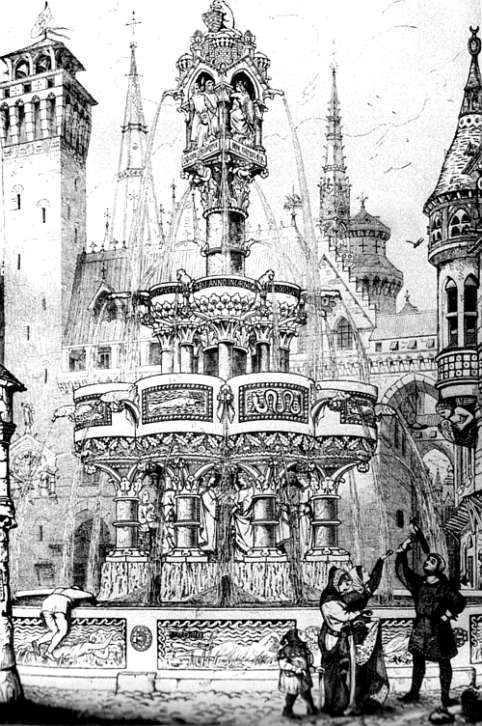
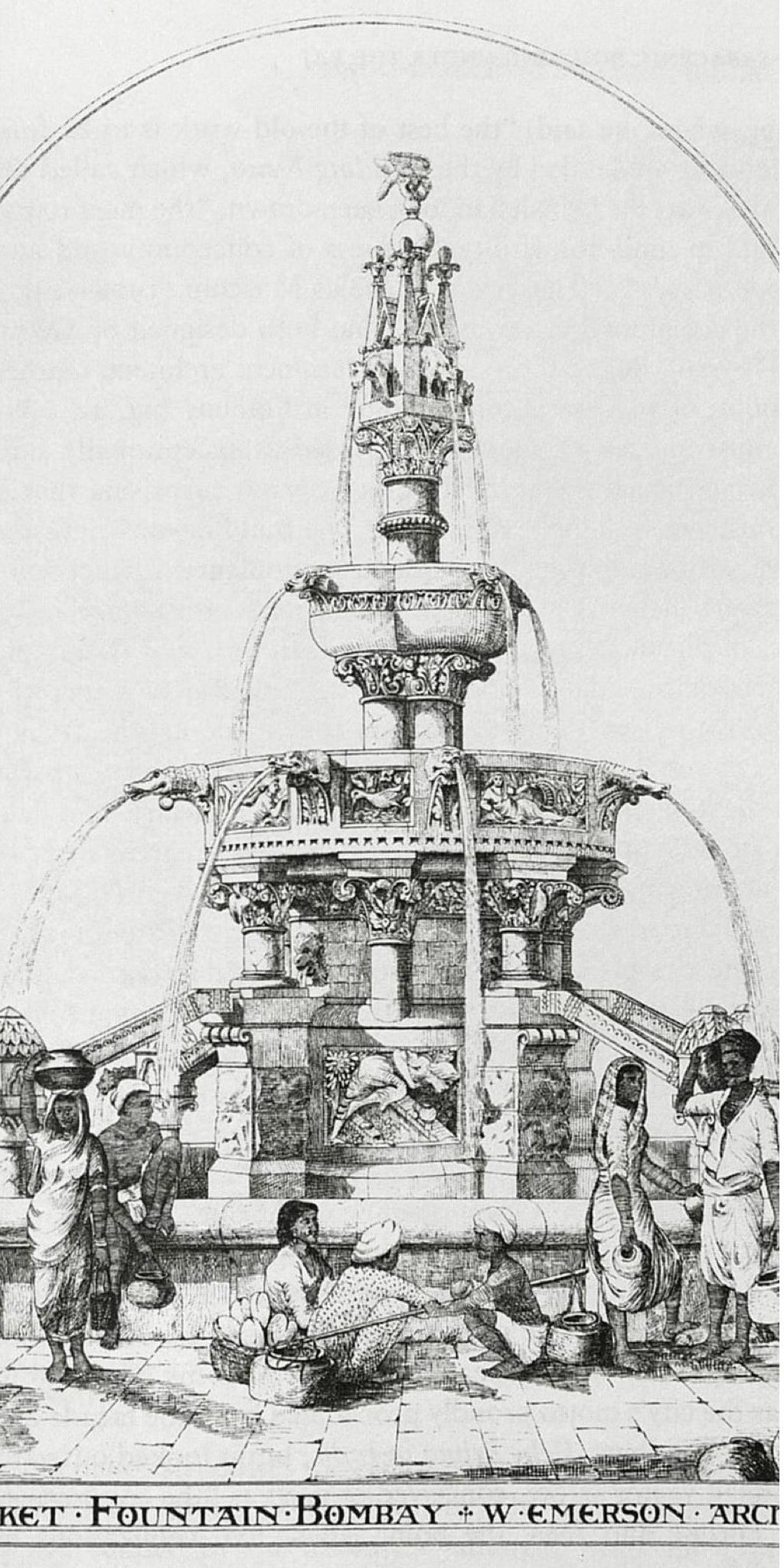
Victorian architect William Burges design for a fountain in the city of Gloucester (left), the work was intended to commemorate the Hafren legends but was never constructed. However, the work greatly inspired a later design by William Emerson (right), which became the Crawford Market Fountain in Mumbai

Several statues of Hafren have been made or planned. These include an 1846 statue at Shrewsbury by Peter Hollins, an 1855 marble sculpture by Holme Cardwell exhibited at the Royal Academy and an elaborate fountain planned by the architect and designer, William Burges In 1858 to be located in the city of Gloucester, but never constructed.

Perhaps the most well known Hafren artwork is the Statue of Sabrina by William Calder Marshall. The Statue was donated to Amherst College in Amherst, Massachusetts in 1857, but became the subject of regular pranks, vandalism, and thefts, starting with an incident in 1860 and ending when the class of 2024 obtained the statue in the week before commencement; since when its whereabouts remain unknown.

=== Gallery ===
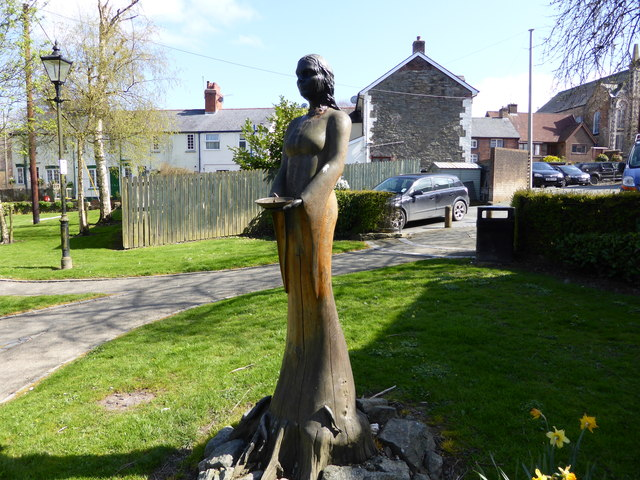
Statue of Hafren beside the Severn in Llanidloes, Wales

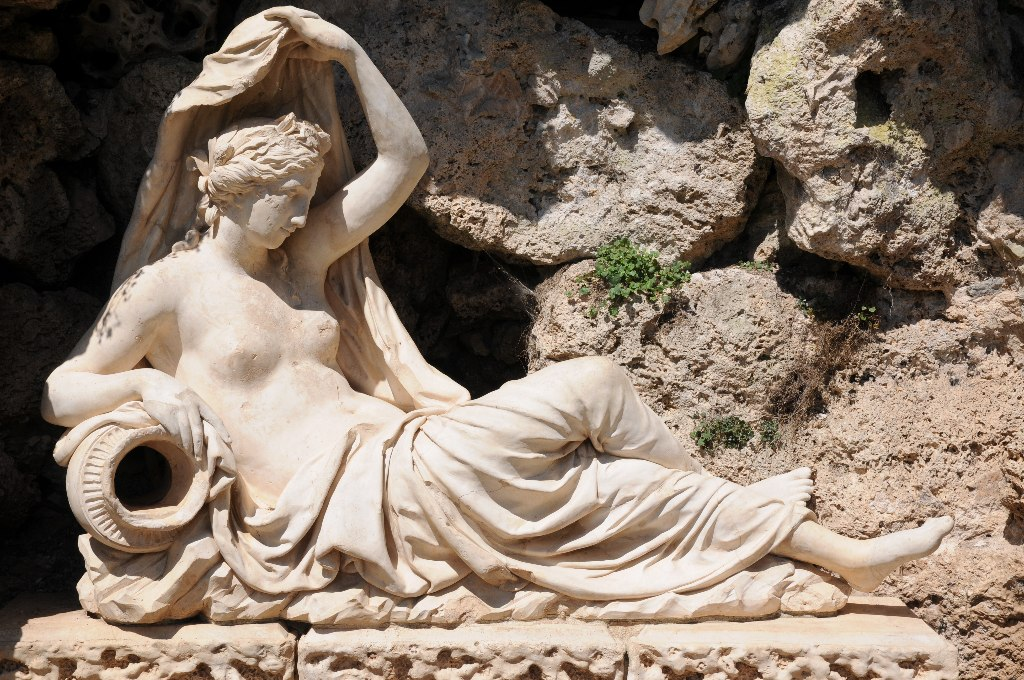
Statue of Sabrina at Croome Court

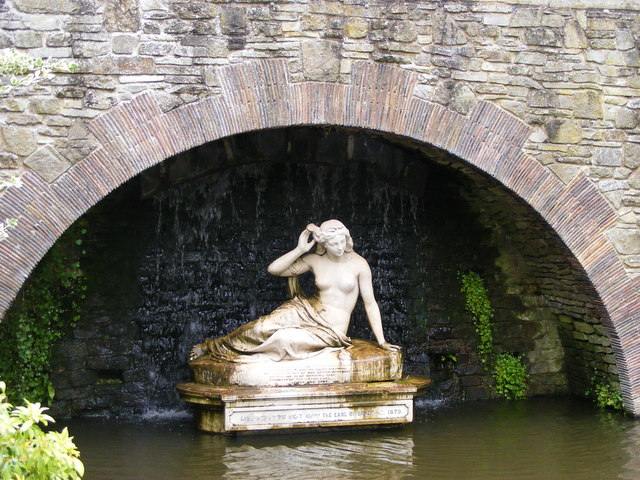
Statue of Sabrina in The Dingle, Shrewsbury

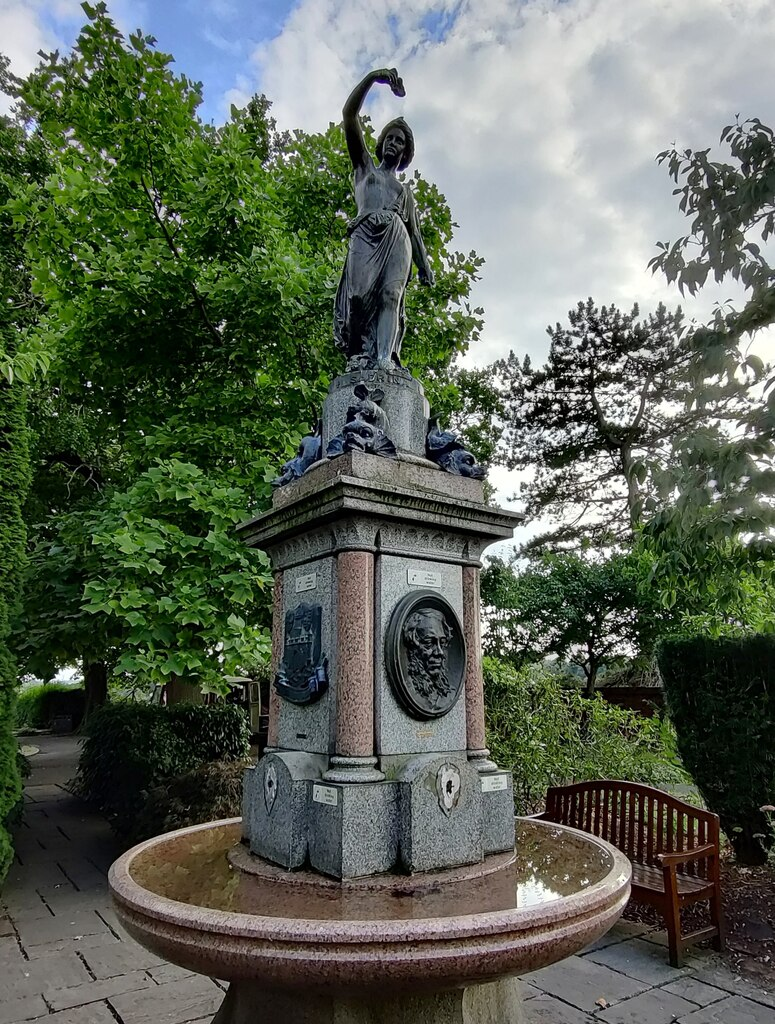
Drinking fountain depicting Sabrina, Castle Gardens, Bridgnorth

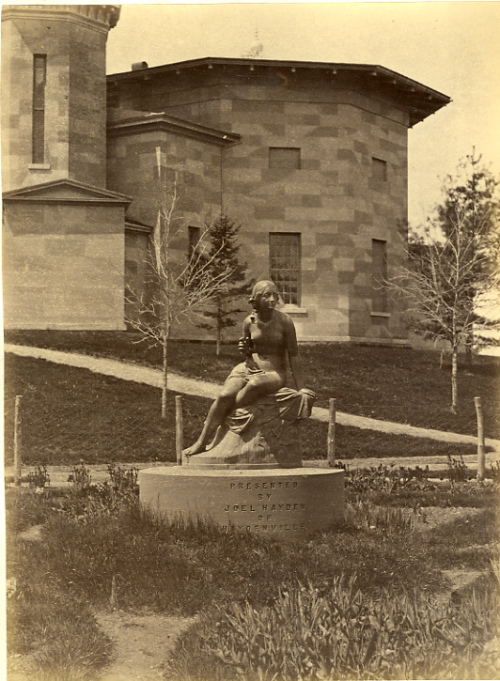
The Statue of Sabrina at Amherst College, Massachusetts

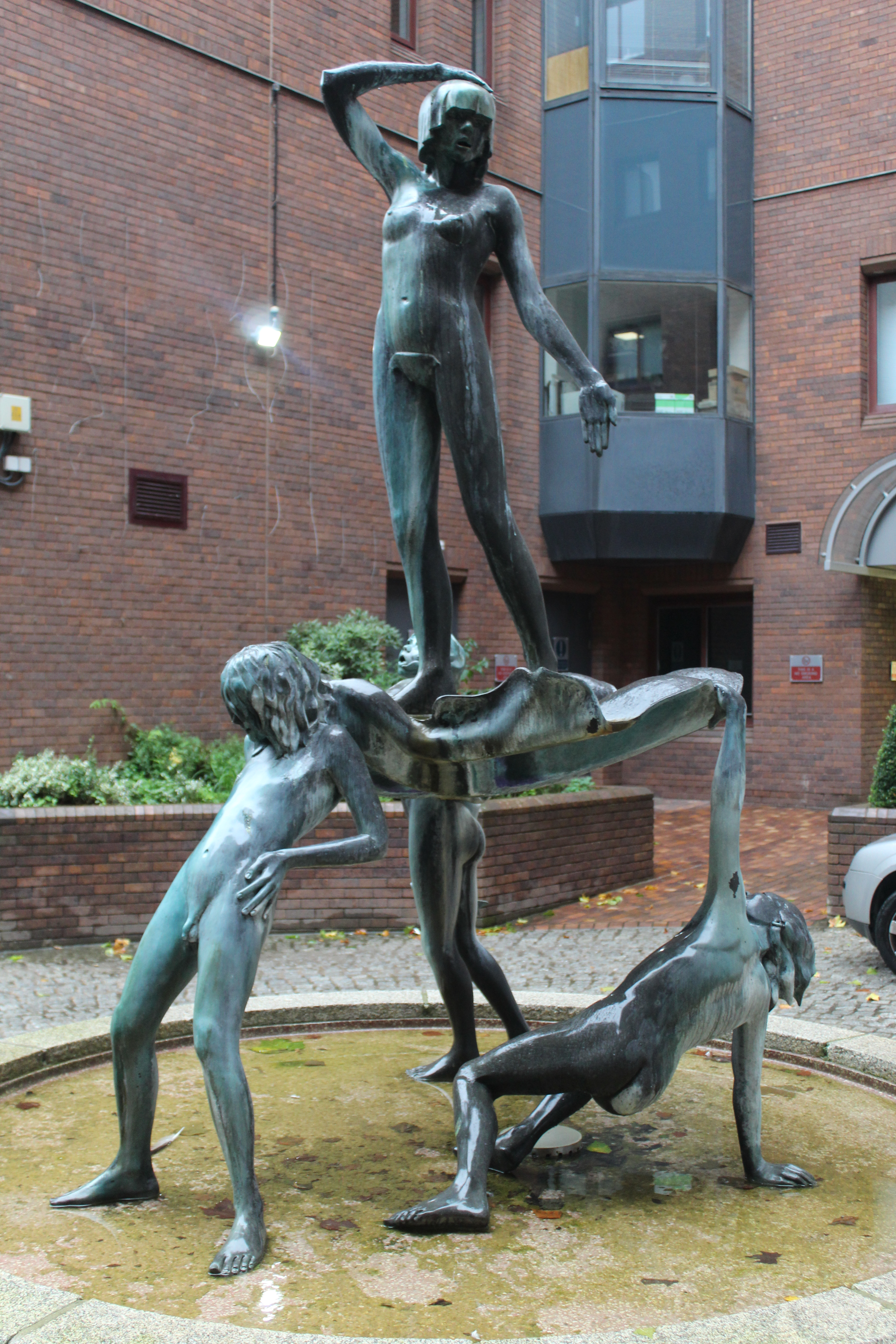
The Apotheosis of Sabrina, Goddess of the Severn, by Gerald Laing, Bristol

== See also ==
- Hafren Forest
- Sabrina Way, a long-distance footpath
- 2264 Sabrina, a minor planet named after Hafren
- Aerfen, goddess of the River Dee
