= Locrine =

Elizabethan play

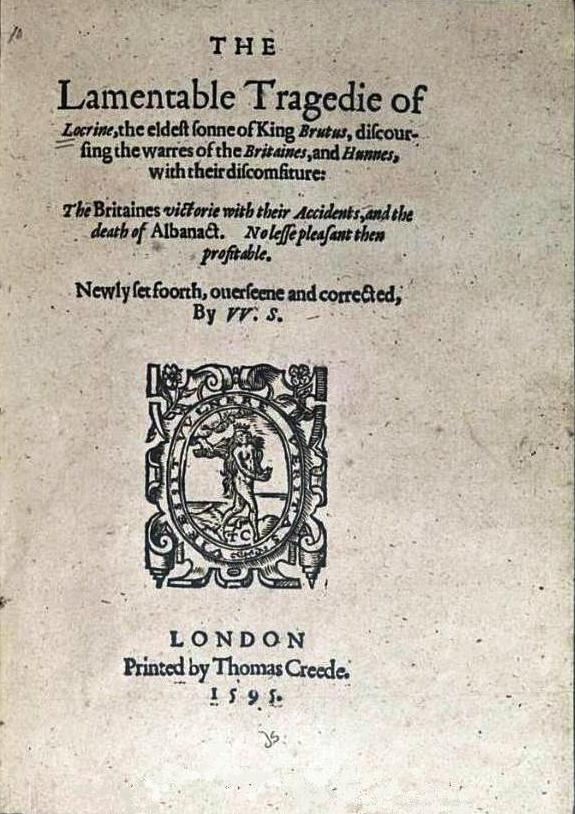
Title page of Locrine (1595)

Locrine is an Elizabethan play depicting the legendary Trojan founders of the nation of England and of Troynovant (London). The play presents a cluster of complex and unresolved problems for scholars of English Renaissance theatre.

== Date ==
Locrine was entered into the Stationers' Register on 20 July 1594 and published in 1595 in a quarto issued by printer Thomas Creede. Individual scholars have proposed dates for the play from the early 1580s on; many have favored a date c. 1591, based on the play's links with other works of the era. It has been argued, for example, that Locrine borrows from the Complaints of Edmund Spenser, published in 1591, and from The Complaint of Elstred, a poem by Thomas Lodge, written c. 1591, that circulated in manuscript before its first printing in 1593. The question of the play's date is complicated by the question of its authorship; if Charles Tilney was the play's author (see below), it must date prior to Tilney's death in 1586.

== Authorship ==
The title page of the 1595 quarto advertised the play as "Newly set foorth, overseene and corrected, / By W. S." An identification of "W. S." with William Shakespeare apparently led to the play's inclusion among the seven works that Philip Chetwinde added to the second impression of his Shakespeare Third Folio in 1664 – which in turn led to the inclusion of Locrine in the Shakespeare Apocrypha. The play's stiff, formal verse is un-Shakespearean – but the extant text of Locrine does show evidence of revision. Some commentators have accepted the possibility that Shakespeare might have performed a revision – while others have rejected the idea. The authorship of the original play has been assigned to several dramatists of the era, with George Peele and Robert Greene being the two most common candidates. In 2020, authorship attribution specialist Darren Freebury-Jones provided the most exhaustive examination of the play's linguistic and prosodic habits, concluding that Greene is the play's most likely author. Freebury-Jones's case was developed in a full-length monograph in 2022. Reviewing this analysis, MacDonald P. Jackson concluded that sole attribution to Greene was unlikely, and that a cautious approach would be to consider the play 'by author or authors unknown.'

A manuscript note found in a copy of the 1595 quarto, and apparently by Sir George Buck, who was Master of the Revels under King James I from 1609 to 1622, states that his cousin, Charles Tilney, was the author:

Char. Tilney wrot[e a]
Tragedy of this mattr [which]
hee named Estrild: [which]
I think is this. it was [lost?]
by his death. & now s[ome]
fellon [possibly fellou] hath published [it.]
I made du[m]be shewes for it.
w[hi]ch I yet haue. G. B.

(The note is trimmed along its right edge, obscuring some words.) Samuel A. Tannenbaum disputed the authenticity of the note, claiming it was a forgery, probably by John Payne Collier, but it has been demonstrated that the handwriting is genuine. If Charles Tilney wrote the play, it must date before his 1586 execution for participation in the Babington Plot. There is no evidence, however, that Charles Tilney did any dramatic writing, other than his alleged connection with Locrine.

== Sources and influences ==
For the subject of his play, the author of Locrine drew upon a legendary pseudo-history of the founding of Britain. Just as Virgil, in the Aeneid, credited the founding of Ancient Rome to exiles from a defeated Troy, so later English writers such as William Caxton and Raphael Holinshed, adapting the medieval pseudo-history of the Welsh-Norman author Geoffrey of Monmouth, credited another band of Trojan exiles for the foundation of a British realm. It was this fanciful origin myth, applied to the English rather than the Brythons, that provided the foundation for Locrine (Locrinus in Geoffrey's Historia Regum Britanniae). The author also drew material from the Mirror for Magistrates.

The revenge tragedies of Seneca were a major influence on Locrine. In addition to the poetry of Spenser and Lodge noted above, critics have pointed to links with the contemporary dramas of Christopher Marlowe, Thomas Kyd, Robert Greene and George Peele. Links with contemporary plays and playwrights can be, and have been, variously interpreted as evidence of influence or evidence of common authorship.

== Locrine and Selimus ==
Locrine shares a complex inter-relationship with another anonymous play of its era, Selimus, first published in 1594. The commonalities between the two plays involve parallels of plot elements and shared verbal expression and prosodic structure. The majority of scholars who have considered the problem judge the author of Selimus to have borrowed from Locrine – though a minority has favored the opposite conclusion. The common features in the two plays have led some critics to suppose that they are the work of the same author; but since both plays are anonymous and their authorship is disputed, the connection between the two dramas obscures as much as it enlightens.

== Synopsis ==
Following the Senecan model of revenge tragedy, each of the play's five acts is preceded by a Prologue that features Atë, the ancient Greek goddess of folly and ruin. In each, Ate introduces and explicates a dumbshow; the play's five dumbshows feature symbolic figures and animals, or personages of classical mythology. In the first, an archer kills a lion; the second shows Perseus and Andromeda, and the third, a snake stinging a crocodile. The fourth dumbshow features Hercules and Omphale; the final dumbshow depicts Medea's murder of Jason and Glauce. Ate returns for a sixth and final appearance at the play's conclusion.

The opening scene of the play proper shows the aged Brutus, the leader of the Trojans in Britain, before his courtiers, including his three sons, Locrine, Albanact and Camber. Brutus knows he is dying, and attempts to order the kingdom's affairs; among other points, he decrees that Locrine marry Guendoline, the daughter of his loyal general Corineus. The scene ends with Brutus's death. Locrine obeys his father's behest and marries Guendoline.

Meanwhile, the invading Scythians arrive for their incursion into the British Isles, led by their king Humber, with his wife Estrild and their son Hubba. Subsequent scenes depict a back-and-forth combat between Trojans and Scythians. When his apparent victory turns to sudden defeat, the Trojan prince Albanact commits suicide; Albanact's ghost appears through the remainder of the play, calling for revenge. The Trojans are eventually victorious. Estrild, the Scythian queen, is captured and brought to the Trojan court, where Locrine quickly falls in love with her. Corineus warns his royal son-in-law to remain faithful to Guendoline. Locrine does not follow this advice, though he sequesters Estrild in a subterranean hideaway for seven years. Once Corineus dies, Locrine brings his affair into the open; Guendoline's brother Thrasimachus vows revenge.

The defeated Humber has been living in seclusion and grinding privation for seven years since his defeat; when he kills himself, the ghost of Albanact exults. Corineus's ghost also appears to witness Locrine's fate; defeated in battle by the forces of Guendoline and Thrasimachus, Locrine and Estrild commit suicide, and their daughter Sabren eventually drowns herself. Guendoline has her husband buried royally, next to his father, but consigns Estrild to an obscure grave.

The play's comic relief is provided by a coterie of clown characters, Strumbo, Trompart, and Dorothy. Strumbo the cobbler marries Dorothy, but is impressed into the army along with his servant Trompart, to fight the Scythians. Strumbo survives battle by counterfeiting death:

Trompart: Yet one word, good master.
Strumbo: I will not speak, for I am dead, I tell thee.

Later Strumbo has an encounter with Humber, just before the latter's suicide. Strumbo is prepared to feed the starving Humber, but is frightened away by Albanact's ghost.

== In performance ==
In 2020, the Beyond Shakespeare Company released online a play-reading and discussion of The Lamentable Tragedy of Locrine.
