= Corineus =

Fighter of giants in medieval British legend

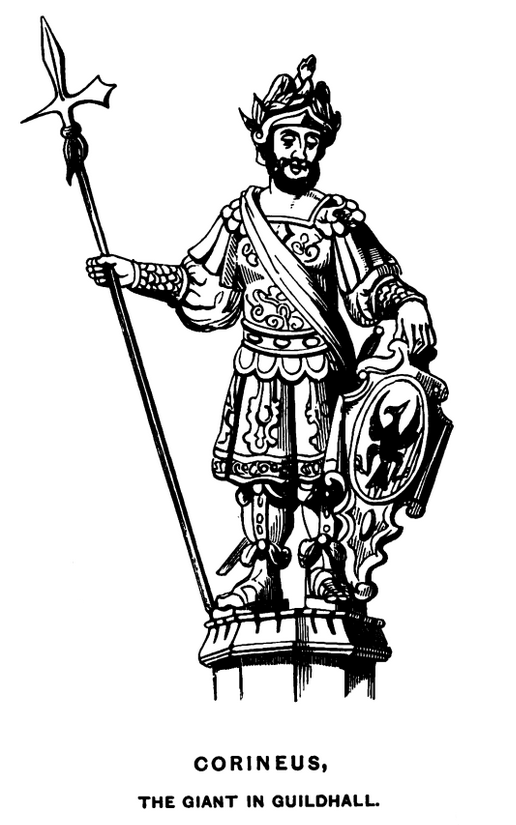
- One of two wooden figures in the Guildhall in London, carved in 1709, that replaced wicker and pasteboard effigies traditionally carried in the Lord Mayor's Show. They represented Gogmagog and Corineus, and were later known as Gog and Magog. Both were destroyed in the London Blitz in 1940; new ones were carved in 1953.

Ruler of Cornwall
- Predecessor: First
- Successor: Queen Gwendolen
- Issue: Queen Gwendolen

In medieval British legend, Corineus was a prodigious warrior, a fighter of giants, and the eponymous founder of Cornwall.

== History of the Kings of Britain ==
Corineus first appears in Geoffrey of Monmouth's pseudo-history History of the Kings of Britain (1136), where he led the descendants of the Trojans who fled with Antenor after the Trojan War and settled on the coasts of the Tyrrhenian Sea. (Note: Some versions of the History of the Kings of Britain specify that this was four generations after Antenor.) He is described as "a modest man in matters of council, and of great courage and boldness"; his giant-fighting prowess is also described, and later reinforced by boasts of having killed "heaps" of Tyrrhenian giants.

After Brutus, a descendant of the Trojan prince Aeneas, had been exiled from Italy and liberated the enslaved Trojans in Greece, he encountered Corineus and his people, who joined him in his travels. In Gaul, Corineus provoked a war with Goffarius Pictus, king of Aquitania, by hunting in his forests without permission; in the ensuing battle, Corineus single-handedly killed thousands with a battle-axe. (Note: Corineus begins the battle using a sword, but loses it and by good luck finds the battle-axe which he uses through the rest of the battle.) After defeating Goffarius, the Trojans crossed to the island of Albion, which Brutus renamed Britain after himself. Corineus settled in Cornwall, which was then inhabited by giants. Brutus and his army killed most of them, but their leader Goemagog was kept alive for a wrestling match with Corineus. During the fight, Goemagog broke three of Corineus' ribs; enraged, he picked Goemagog up, ran to the coast, and threw the giant from a high rock into the sea, with the craggy rocks below tearing him to pieces.

Corineus was the first of the legendary rulers of Cornwall, which was named after him. After Brutus died the rest of Britain was divided between Brutus' three sons, Locrinus (Loegria), Kamber (Cambria) and Albanactus (Alba). Locrinus agreed to marry Corineus's daughter Gwendolen, but fell in love instead with Estrildis, a captured German princess. Corineus threatened war in response to this affront, and to pacify him Locrinus married Gwendolen, but kept Estrildis as his secret mistress. After Corineus died Locrinus divorced Gwendolen and married Estrildis, and Gwendolen responded by raising an army in Cornwall and making war against her ex-husband. Locrinus was killed in battle, and Gwendolen threw Estrildis and her daughter, Sabren, into the River Severn.

== Aeneid and other sources ==
Geoffrey probably took the name from the character Corynaeus in the Aeneid, a Trojan follower of Aeneas. Archbishop Michael Joseph Curley suggests that this name was chosen by Geoffrey due to its similarity to the word Cornwall, and his "naive (or ironic) fondness for eponymy as a form of historical research".

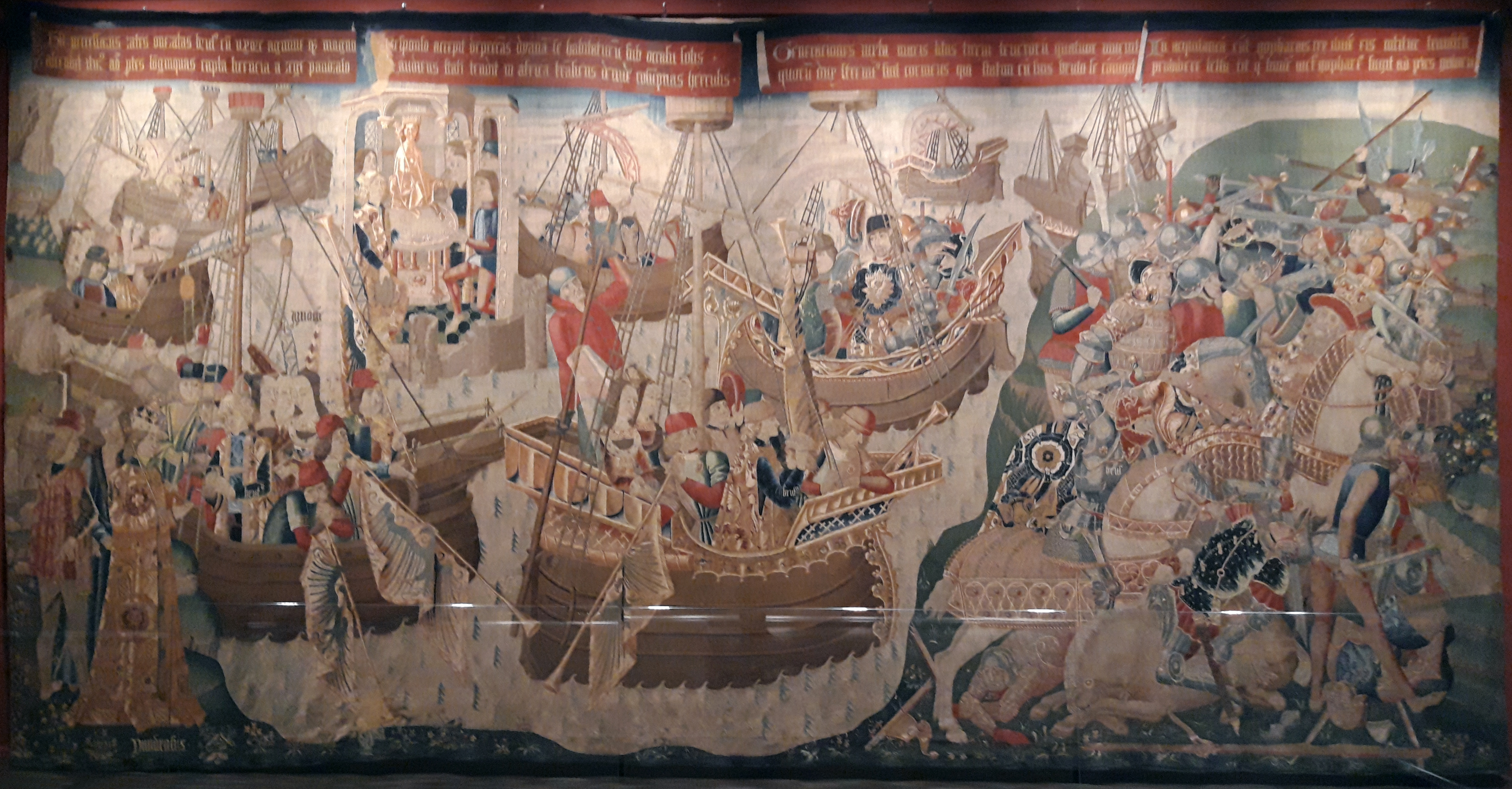
Corineus (upper centre) sailing with Brutus to Gaul in a c. 1475 tapestry now in the Cathedral of the Savior of Zaragoza.

Curley also suggests there is a parallel between Corineus and Hercules in Lucan's Pharsalia, who defeated the giant Antaeus in a wrestling match by lifting him from the earth, the source of his strength.

Geoffrey's main source for the History of the Kings of Britain was the Historia Brittonum. It does not mention Corineus, but two parts of the Historia were used as sources for Corineus' location on "the shores" of the Tyrrhenian Sea, where he is found by Brutus. The first is the Historia's account of Brutus' banishment: unlike the History of the Kings of Britain, where Brutus immediately goes to Greece, Brutus instead first travels to "the islands of the Tyrrhenian Sea", where, instead of Corineus, he finds Greek colonists living, who expel him due to Aeneas' killing of Turnus. (Note: The same passage can also be interpreted as Brutus travelling first to the Tyrrhenian islands, and then to Greece, where he is expelled.) The second is a variant of the story of Goídel Glas, in which the hero travels from Egypt to Iberia via a sequence of named places – Africa, then Aras Philaenorum, Lacus Salinarum, between Rusicada and the Mountains of Azaria, along the River Malua through Mauretania to the Pillars of Hercules, then the Tyrrhenian Sea – Geoffrey uses precisely the same sequence of locations for Brutus' journey after getting his prophecy from Diana, and even explains the backtracking from the Pillars of Hercules to the Tyrrhenian Sea by saying Brutus was fleeing from Sirens; it is at this point in the story of the History of the Kings of Britain that Brutus finds Corineus on "the shores" of the Tyrrhenian Sea.

== Gogmagog's Leap ==
The fight between Corineus and Gogmagog is described in the History of the Kings of Britain as ending at a place called Saltus Goemagog or 'Goemagog's Leap', which Geoffrey says still retained the name. John Milton's The History of Britain (1670) referred to the place as Langoëmagog, 'the Giants leap', which is sometimes changed to Langoënagog or Langnagog. The Middle English prose Brut (c. 1419) places their fight "at Totttenes" (Totnes, Devon), where Corineus and Brutus had landed in the History of the Kings of Britain, while Holinshed's Chronicles (1577) placed the "leape of Gogmagog" at Dover.

Researcher Peter Bartrum suggests that the story may have been based on hill figures of two giants fighting carved into the grass at Plymouth Hoe. The first known mention of these figures was in 1495, and contemporary records exist of them being periodically re-cut and cleaned, referring to them as Gogmagog. Antiquary Richard Carew believed that the fight may have begun near Totnes, but ended at Plymouth Hoe, with the figures depicting Corineus and Gogmagog; he described them in his Survey of Cornwall (1602): "upon the Hawe at Plymmouth, there is cut out in the ground, the pourtrayture of two men, the one bigger, the other lesser, with Clubbes in their hands, (whom they terme Gog-Magog) and (as I have learned) it is renewed by order of the Townesmen, when cause requireth, which should inferre the same to bee a monument of some moment." Later historians such as John Allen Giles followed this suggestion as the most likely location.

The figures were destroyed by the construction of the Royal Citadel in 1665. In 2021, artist Charles Newington painted Corineus and Gogmagog on a grassy bank below the Citadel, inspired by the earlier figures and the story of Corineus and Gogmagog.

== Later traditions ==
The tale is preserved in the works of later writers, including Michael Drayton and John Milton.

John of Hauville's Architrenius (c. 1184) was dedicated to Archbishop Walter de Coutances, who claimed descent from Corineus. The Architrenius changes Corineus into a greater figure than Brutus (who it says accompanied Corineus as his Achates), and describes him as "the world-conqueror", a second Hercules, who fought in the Trojan War: "the terror of Achilles and the Atrides, the cutter-down of giants and batterer of monsters". While "sojourning on the Tyrrhenian shores, Corineus destroyed the limbs of giants with a bone-crushing embrace. He was himself a giant, not in body but in his indomitable heroism. Though confined to medium stature, and with limbs not disproportionately thick, he seemed to assume a Titanic stature, massive and terrifying." After massacring the Aquitanians he sets sail for Britain "favoured by gods and winds, and guided by Diana to his destined corner of the world, he enters safe harbour on the Cornish coast at Totnes"; Cornwall is described as "flowing with milk and honey. Hence the place, at first named Corineia, over the course of time assumed the corrupted name of Cornubia." King Arthur is later described as a descendant of Corineus.

The 13th century Prose Merlin calls the character Corneus, a descendant of giants, who was "a mervilouse knyght, and was moche and stronge". In this version, he and Brutus were two barons who fled the destruction of Troy, but while Brutus travelled to Britain, Corneus travelled to Brittany instead, where he built towns and castles, and gave his name to Cornouaille. Corneus' descendants were the giants who troubled the Britons, and they survived until the time of King Arthur.

Locrine (1595), a play attributed to Shakespeare, has Corineius [sic] as a major character, one of two brothers of Brutus, along with Assarachus, and is father to Gwendoline and Thrasimachus. Corineius is described as being found by Brutus at "the fields of Lestrigon", and subsequently having fought Gathelus, the brother of Goffarius of Gaul. He lives more than eighty-seven years, dying from a lingering wound he had received in battle with Humber the Hun, and returns as a ghost to witness Locrine's downfall.

Corineus was also a major character in Henry Chettle and John Day's lost play The Conquest of Brute with the First Finding of the Bath which was performed by the Lord Admiral's Men at the Rose in December 1598.

Oliver Mathews' Towne of Sallop (1616) refers to "Troenius, Duke of Cornwall, who was afterward called Coreneus". Richard Williams Morgan expanded on this in The British Kymry (1857), calling him Troenius, and saying that he was assigned the "Western Keryn or promotory" of Britain (from Torbay to Land's End) by Brutus, and that "from the Keryn, Troenius changed his name into Keryn or Corineus". Morgan also attempted to explain Brutus' backtracking from the Pillars of Hercules to the Tyrrhenian Sea, by saying that he passed through the Pillars of Hercules, and came across Troenius on the south shore of Spain, where he was ruling four Trojan colonies, claiming that the Atlantic was then called the Tyrrhenian Ocean. He described Troenius as sovereign duke of Cornwall, with the same prerogatives over his land as the kings of Loegria, Cambria and Albany had over theirs, and said that Troenius was consigned the guardianship of his daughter Gwendolen's son Maddan.

As to Corineus's stature, he is represented as being the largest of Brutus's crew in the Middle English prose Brut. Holinshed's Chronicles comments that Corineus was not a giant, but in the 1587 edition mistakenly claims the Architrenius described Corineus as a man 12 cubits (18 feet) tall.

A local folk tradition says that Corineus founded the city of Quimper, the ancient capital of Cornouaille in France.

== See also ==
- Corinius
- Cornish wrestling

== Notes ==
Legendary titles
First	Ruler of Cornwall	Succeeded by Gwendolen
