= Innogen =

Legendary Queen

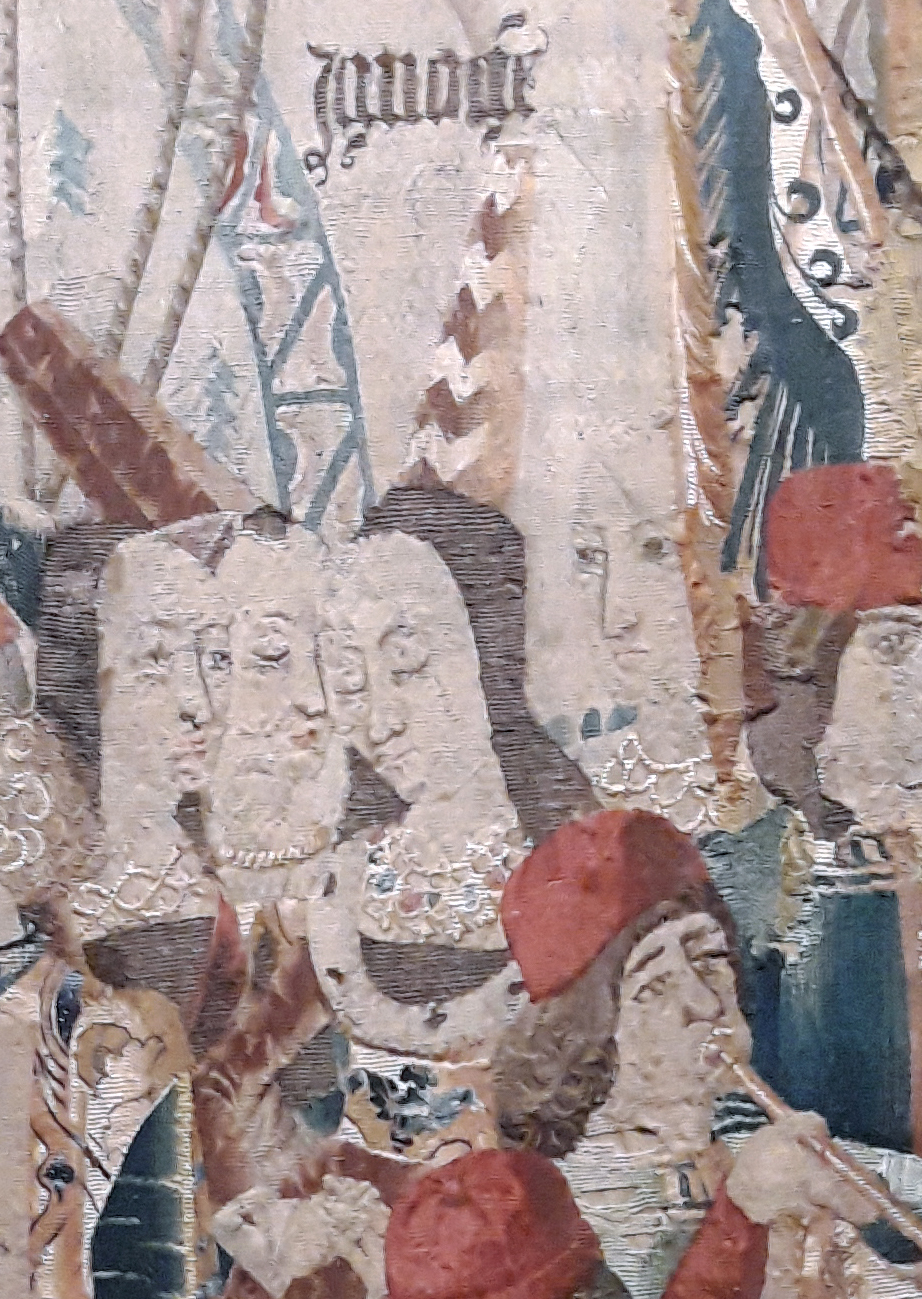
Innogen in a c. 1475 tapestry now in the Cathedral of the Savior of Zaragoza

Innogen is a character in the Historia Regum Britanniae and subsequent medieval British pseudo-history. She was said to have been a Greek princess, the daughter of King Pandrasus, and to have become Britain's first Queen consort as the wife of Brutus of Troy, the purported first king of Britain who was said to have lived around the 12th century BC. Her sons Locrinus, Camber, and Albanactus went on to rule Loegria, Cambria, and Alba respectively.

== Historia Regum Britanniae ==
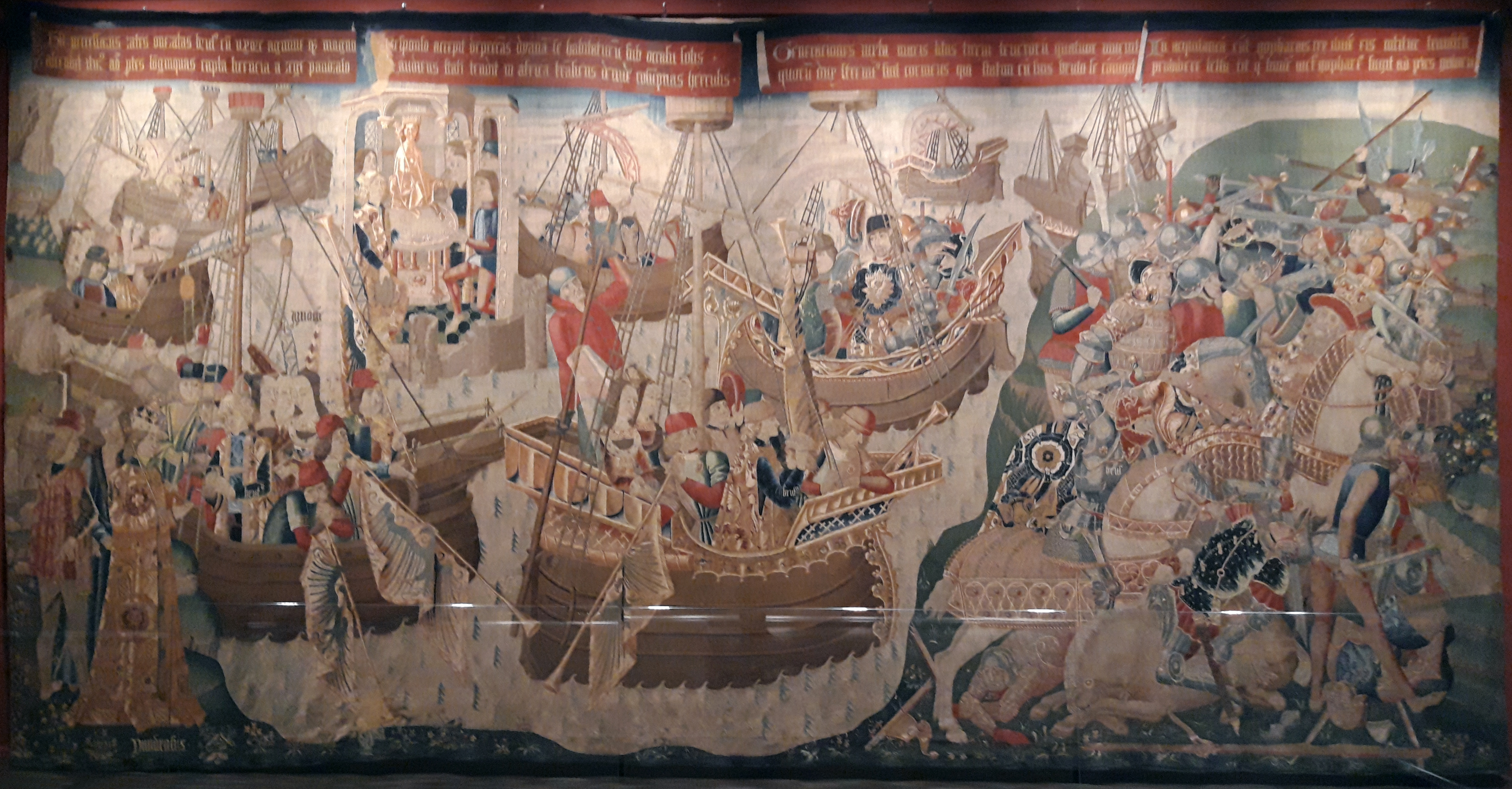
Complete tapestry of "Brutus' expedition to Aquitaine", with Innogen on the left

Innogen first appears in Geoffrey of Monmouth's Historia Regum Britanniae (c. 1136). She was the eldest daughter of the Greek king Pandrasus, and was given in marriage to Brutus of Troy after he united the enslaved Trojans in Greece and defeated Pandrasus to gain their freedom.

When Innogen left Greece with Brutus and the Trojans, she was inconsolable at leaving her parents and country. They travelled through the Mediterranean, around the coast of Iberia and Gaul, and arrived in Britain, where it was prophesied that Brutus would found an empire.

Innogen had three sons with Brutus, who divided his kingdom between them after his death: the eldest, Locrinus, inherited Loegria (England except for Cornwall, which belonged to Brutus' general Corineus); Camber inherited Cambria (Wales); and the youngest, Albanactus, inherited Alba (Scotland).

Her great-great grandson Ebraucus named one of his thirty daughters Ignogni, who was sent along with her sisters to Alba Silvius in Italy, where they were married to the Trojan nobility there.

Academic Fiona Tolhurst suggests that Innogen performs a pivotal function in the foundation of Brutus' Britain, by providing legitimacy to his rule through her bloodline, in the same way that Lavinia did for Aeneas.

== Name ==
Innogen's name is spelled a number of different ways in the Historia Regum Britanniae, with the best readings being Innogen and Ignogen; other spellings include Ignoge, Euogen, and Ygnogen.

The name is likely to be Celtic in origin, from Gaelic inghean (Irish iníon and Scottish Gaelic nighean), meaning 'daughter', 'girl', or 'maiden'. However, Innogen could instead be derived from the Latin name Innocentia, with a possible intermediate Celtic form of the name being Enogent.

The character in the Historia is Greek, and it has been suggested that Innogen was intended to be a Greek name, with possible reconstructions ἐκγόνη (Ecgone, 'a daughter'), or ‑ιγόνη (‑igone) from the final part of a name such as Erigone or Antigone. (Note: The theory that Innogen might be derived from ‑ιγόνη (‑igone) was put forward by Peter Roberts. Roberts suggested that Geoffrey of Monmouth might have been reading a manuscript which had a Greek name such as Erigone or Antigone, but the first part of the name was illegible, leading him to form the name Innogen from the remaining readable part.) The related name Imogen is attested, from before the Historia. (Note: Imogen of Dol, the sister of Rivallon I of Dol, died some time after 1064, around seventy years before Geoffrey of Monmouth wrote the Historia (c. 1136).)

The coat of arms of the former Duchy of Brittany, blazoned "Ermine", which had its origin attributed to Innogen

Modern uses of the name Imogen probably derive from a misspelling of Innogen in the 1623 First Folio edition of William Shakespeare's Cymbeline. Shakespeare probably took the name from a retelling of the story of Innogen and Brutus in Holinshed's Chronicles (1577), and had used the name Innogen once before for a non-speaking 'ghost character' in Much Ado About Nothing (1600). An early description of Cymbeline by Simon Forman in 1611 consistently spells the name of the character as "Innogen", and the spelling of the character's name as "Imogen" in the First Folio appears to have been the result of "scribal or compositorial error".

=== Other mentions ===
Innogen was mentioned in the funeral orations of Anne of Brittany in 1514. In the oration, Guillaume Parvi traced Anne's ancestry back to Innogen, and recounted a story that explained the origin of her family's heraldic ermine coat of arms. According to the story, during a hunt at Le Croisic, a stoat being pursued by Brutus' dogs took refuge with Innogen, who saved and fed it, and adopted it for ordre et armes ('order and arms').

Edmund Spenser mentioned Innogen in book two, canto ten of The Faerie Queene (1590), as "fayre Inogene of Italy".

Innogen was a character in the lost play The Conquest of Brute with the First Finding of the Bath by Henry Chettle and John Day, which was performed by the Lord Admiral's Men at the Rose in December 1598.
