= Maddan =

King of Loegria, Kambria and Albania
- Reign: fl. 1100BCE
- Predecessor: Queen Gwendolen
- Successor: Mempricius

King of Cornwall
- Predecessor: Queen Gwendolen
- Successor: Mempricius
- Issue: Mempricius; Malin
- Father: Locrinus

Maddan was a legendary king of the Britons as accounted by Geoffrey of Monmouth. He came to power in 1100BC. He was the son of King Locrinus and Queen Gwendolen, who both ruled Britain separately.

He was born during the reign of Locrinus but soon after, his grandfather Corineus of Cornwall died and his mother defeated Locrinus in battle. His mother reigned for the fifteen years of Maddan's adolescence then she abdicated in his favor. Soon after taking the throne, he married and became the father of Mempricius and Malin. For forty years he reigned peacefully until his death when civil war broke out between his sons.

== Notes ==
Legendary titles
Preceded by Gwendolen	King of Loegria, Kambria and Albania at maturity	Succeeded by Mempricius
Preceded by Gwendolen	King of Cornwall on Gwendolen's death	Succeeded by Mempricius
