= Queen Gwendolen =

Queen of Cornwall
- Predecessor: Corineus
- Successor: Maddan

Queen of Loegria and Albania
- Predecessor: Locrinus
- Successor: Maddan

Queen of Kambria
- Predecessor: Kamber
- Successor: Maddan
- Spouse: Locrinus
- Issue: Maddan
- Father: Corineus

Gwendolen, also known as Gwendolin, or Gwendolyn (Latin: Guendoloēna) was a legendary ruler of ancient Britain.

As told by Geoffrey of Monmouth in his historical account Historia Regum Britanniae, she was the repudiated queen of King Locrinus until she defeated her husband in battle at the River Stour. This river was the dividing line between Cornwall and Loegria, two key locations in ancient Britain. After defeating the king, she took on the leadership of the Britons, becoming their first queen regnant.

== Life ==
According to Geoffrey of Monmouth, Gwendolen was one of the daughters of Corineus, king of Cornwall, and one of Brutus's warriors. Gwendolen was married to Locrinus, the eldest of King Brutus' three sons, and had a son named Maddan. Upon her father Corineus' death, Locrinus divorced her in favour of his Germanic mistress, Estrildis (by whom he already had a daughter who was named Habren). Gwendolen then fled to Cornwall, where she lived for a few years. After having built up a large army, she waged war against her ex-husband, King Locrinus. In a battle near the River Stour, Locrinus was killed. Gwendolen then assumed his throne and ruled independently, as her father had reigned in Cornwall. After having both her husband's mistress, Estrildis, and her daughter, Habren, drowned in the River Severn (Old Welsh: Habren), the ancient British monarch reigned peacefully for fifteen years. She then abdicated in favour of her son and lived out the remainder of her life in Cornwall.

== Legacy ==
The Historia Regum Britanniae says that at the time of her death Samuel was judge in Judaea, Aeneas Silvius was ruling Alba Longa, and Homer was gaining fame in Greece. She is mentioned in Spenser's poem The Faerie Queene (1590) as Gwendolene, and appears in the mythopoeic writings of William Blake as one of the twelve Daughters of Albion. In the 20th century feminist critics have cited her as an example of a powerful woman healing a fractured Britain with her rule.

Legendary titles
Preceded by Corineus	Queen of Cornwall	Succeeded by Maddan
Preceded by Locrinus	Queen of Loegria and Albania	Succeeded by Maddan
Preceded by Kamber	Queen of Kambria	Succeeded by Maddan
