= Lloegyr =

Medieval Welsh name for a region of Britain

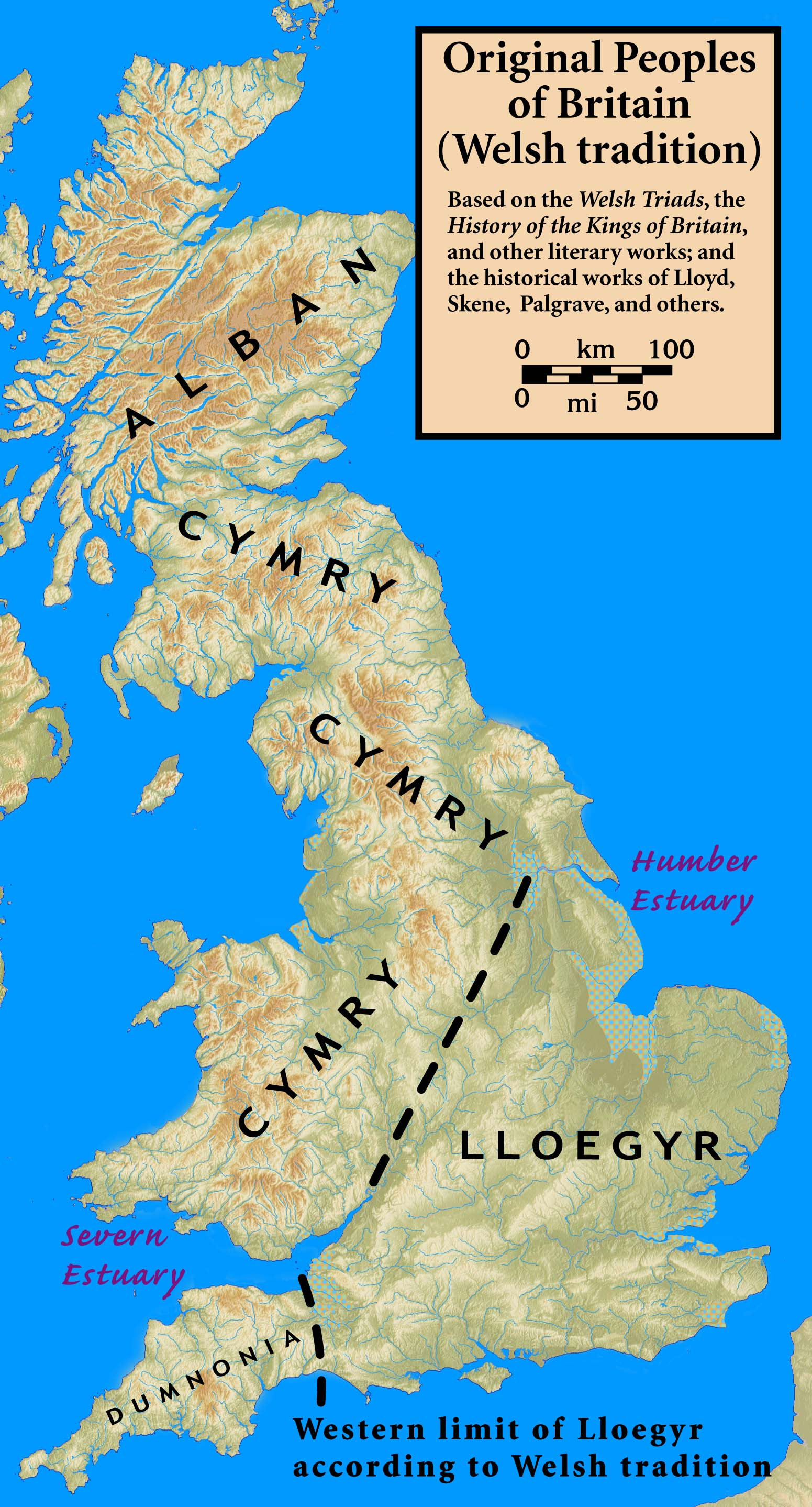

Lloegyr is the medieval Welsh name for a region of Britain (Prydain). The exact borders are unknown, but some modern scholars hypothesize it ran south and east of a line extending from the Humber Estuary to the Severn Estuary, exclusive of Cornwall and Devon. The people of Lloegyr were called Lloegyrwys without distinction of ethnicity, the term applying to both Britons and Anglo-Saxons.

The modern form of the word is Lloegr (pronounced [ˈɬɔɨɡr̩] or [ˈɬɔiɡr̩]) and it has become generalised through the passage of time to become the Welsh word for "England" as a whole, and not restricted to its original, smaller extent. The word has been anglicised and Latinised into such forms as Logres, Logris, and Loegria, among others, and is perhaps most widely recognised as the name of King Arthur's realm in the body of literature known as the Matter of Britain. The word is known to date from the 10th century or earlier, as it appears in the literary Armes Prydein.

== Borders ==
Welsh antiquarians of the 18th and 19th centuries hypothesized that the borders of Lloegyr ran roughly on a line from the Humber Estuary, continuing southwestwards and connecting to the Severn Estuary. The line continues south across the estuary, crossing South West England such that Cornwall and Devon are excluded from Lloegyr. The division is mentioned in literature (e.g., the Welsh Triads) and is supported by the works of respected historians such as John Rhŷs's Celtic Britain and John Edward Lloyd's A History of Wales from the Earliest Times to the Edwardian Conquest.

While Geoffrey of Monmouth invented fanciful characters and places in his stories of Loegria and its eponymous king Locrinus, he also showed that he was aware that the actual boundary of Lloegyr was known to run between the Humber and Severn estuaries, and that Cornwall was distinct from Loegria.

== Etymology ==
The exact origin of the word is uncertain and has spawned a great deal of speculation. 12th-century author Geoffrey of Monmouth offered an etymology in his Historia regum Britanniae, deriving the names of Cambria, Loegria, and Albany from the sons of Brutus of Troy: Camber, Locrinus, and Albanactus, respectively, and makes them the eponymous kings of Wales/Cambria (Camber), England/Loegria (Locrinus), and Scotland/Albany (Albanactus). In 1982, noted linguist Eric Hamp suggested that Lloeg(y)r could be derived from a Proto-Celtic compound *(p)les-okri-s, meaning 'having a nearby border, being from near the border'. Ranko Matasović prefers to see Lloegr as coming from a Brittonic collective noun *Lāikor meaning 'warriors', the root of which he proposes gave Old Irish láech 'warrior' (though some scholars regard the Old Irish word as a loan from Late Latin lāicus 'layman; of the people'), from a Proto-Indo-European root *leh_{2}- 'war'. The suffix -wys found in numerous Welsh ethnic names, including Lloëgrwys, is thought to possibly be derived from the Latin suffix -ēnsēs according to some. Richard Coates makes a suggestion which agrees semantically with Matasović's, but proposes instead that it is borrowed from West Germanic (i.e. pre-Old English) *laikārōs 'performers of exploits, players (in a military sense), warriors'.

== Sources ==
- Geoffrey of Monmouth (1811), "Book II: History of the Kings of Britain", in Roberts, Peter (ed.), The Chronicle of the Kings of Britain (the Brut Tysilio), London: E. Williams, pp. 33, 91
- Higham, Nicholas (1992), Rome, Britain and the Anglo-Saxons, London: B. A. Selby, ISBN 1-85264-022-7
- Jones, Barri; Mattingly, David (2007), An Atlas of Roman Britain, Cambridge: Blackwell Publishers, ISBN 978-1-84217-067-0
- Laing, Lloyd; Laing, Jennifer (1990), "The non-Romanized zone of Britannia", Celtic Britain and Ireland, c. 200–800, New York: St. Martin's Press, pp. 96–123, ISBN 0-312-04767-3
- Lloyd, John Edward (1912), A History of Wales from the Earliest Times to the Edwardian Conquest, vol. I (Second ed.), London: Longmans, Green, and Co.
- Probert, William, ed. (1823), "Triads of the Isle of Britain", The Ancient Laws of Cambria, London: E. Williams, pp. 373–413
- Rhys, John (1904), Celtic Britain (3rd ed.), London: Society for Promoting Christian Knowledge
- Skene, William Forbes (1868), The Four Ancient Books of Wales, vol. I, Edinburgh: Edmonston and Douglas
- Skene, William Forbes (1868), The Four Ancient Books of Wales, vol. II, Edinburgh: Edmonston and Douglas
