= Imogen (given name) =

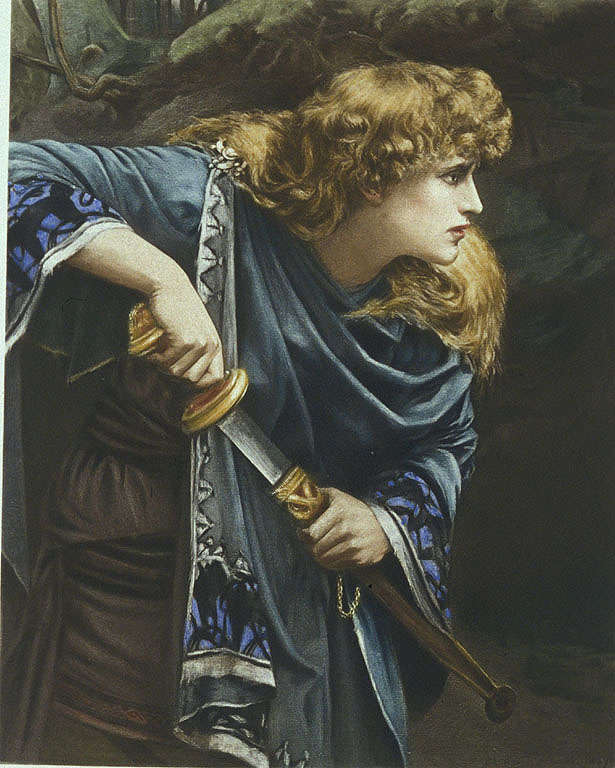
- Imogen from Shakespeare's Cymbeline in a painting by Herbert Gustave Schmalz
- Pronunciation: /ˈɪmədʒən/
- Gender: Female

Origin
- Origin: Unknown, possibly Celtic or Germanic
- Meaning: Unknown, possibly "maiden", "daughter", "innocent" or “beloved child”

Other names
- Related names: Imogene, Innogen, Immy or Imi (nickname), Imo (nickname), Idgie or Midge (nickname) Gen (nickname)

Imogen (/ˈɪmədʒən/), or Imogene (/ˈɪmədʒiːn/), is a feminine given name; see Innogen § Name for its origins.

== Popularity ==
In England and Wales, Imogen was the 34th most popular baby girl name in 2014; in Australia the 35th most popular name for baby girls from 2011 to 2013; in Scotland in 2007, 86th.

The name has historically been uncommon in the United States.

== People ==
- Imogen was a politically influential sister of Rivallon I of Dol, a contemporary and ally of William the Conqueror during the Breton-Norman War.
- Imogen Annesley (born 1970), Australian actress
- Imogen Bailey (born 1977), Australian model, actress and singer
- Imogen Bankier (born 1987), Scottish badminton player
- Imogen Binnie (born 1978/1979), American novelist and screenwriter
- Imogen Boorman (born 1971), British actress from Hellbound: Hellraiser II
- Imogen Cairns (born 1989), British gymnast
- Imogene Coca (1908–2001), American comic actress
- Imogen Cooper (born 1949), English pianist
- Imogen Cunningham (1883–1976), American photographer
- Imogen Edwards-Jones (born 1968), British author
- Imogene Gieling (1923–2024), American metalsmith, educator
- Imogen Grant (born 1996), British rower
- Imogen Hassall (1942–1980), British actress
- Imogen Heap (born 1977), English singer-songwriter
- Imogen Holst (1907–1984), British composer and conductor
- Imogen King (born 1996), English actress
- Imogen Kogge (born 1957), German actress
- Imogen LaChance (1853–1938), American social reformer
- Imogen Lloyd Webber (born 1977), British writer and theatre manager
- Imogen Murphy, Irish film and television director
- Imogen Poots (born 1989), British actress
- Imogen Simmonds (born 1993), British-Swiss triathlete
- Imogen Stuart (1927–2024), German sculptor
- Imogen Stubbs (born 1961), English actress
- Imogen Thomas (born 1982), Welsh model and contestant on Big Brother UK
- Imogen Waterhouse (born 1994), English actress and model

== Fictional characters ==
- Imogen (Shakespeare) from William Shakespeare's play Cymbeline
- Imogene, the heroine of Vincenzo Bellini's opera Il pirata (1827)
- Imogen Forsyte, daughter of Winifred Dartie, in John Galsworthy's The Forsyte Saga
- Imogen Clark, a minor character in What Katy Did by Susan Coolidge
- Imogene Graham, a major character in Indian Summer (1886) by William Dean Howells
- Imogene Herdman, a central character in Barbara Robinson's The Best Christmas Pageant Ever
- Imogene “Idgie” Threadgoode, a principal character in Fried Green Tomatoes at the Whistle Stop Cafe
- Imogen Book, a character in Eoin Colfer's Artemis Fowl: The Time Paradox
- Imogen Melford, one of the Melford sisters in Diana Wynne Jones's The Time of the Ghost
- Imogen Moreno, a character in the Canadian television series Degrassi
- Imogen Spurnrose, a principal character in the Amazon fantasy television series Carnival Row
- Imogene Cleary, a recurring character in the Amazon Prime Video comedy television series The Marvelous Mrs. Maisel played by actress Bailey De Young.
- Imogen Adams, one of the liars in the Pretty Little Liars spinoff, Pretty Little Liars: Original Sin. She is portrayed by Bailee Madison.
- Imogen Reed, a minor character of Frictional Games title SOMA (video game), and one of the main characters of a live-action series inspired by SOMA - Transmissions. Played by actress Trin Miller.
