= Statue of Sabrina =

Bronze statue owned by Amherst College

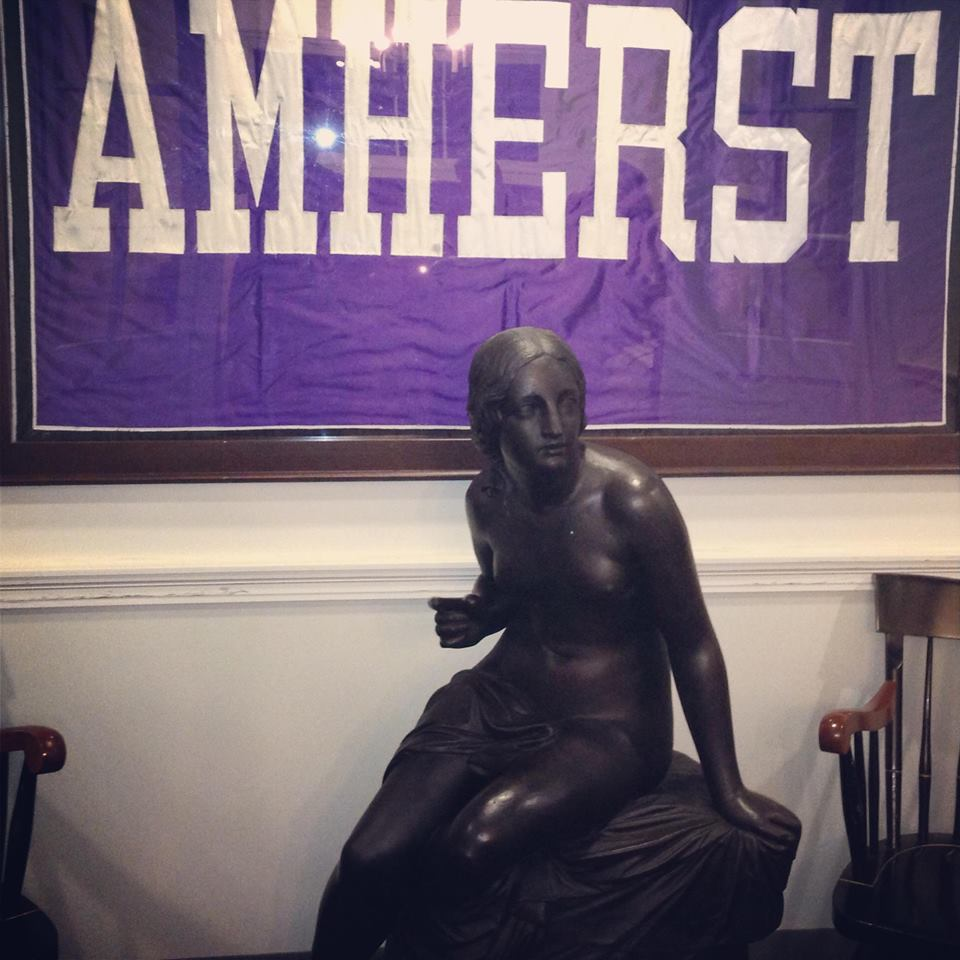
The Sabrina statue

Sabrina (/səˈbraɪnə/ sə-BRY-nə) is a 300-pound bronze statue by William Calder Marshall of the legendary British princess owned by Amherst College, and whose present location is unknown. Since it was donated to the College in 1857, the statue has been the subject of numerous pranks, vandalism, and theft, and it has changed hands between the college administration and various student groups many times. Traditionally, members of even-year and odd-year classes have battled for possession of the statue.

== History ==
=== Early history ===
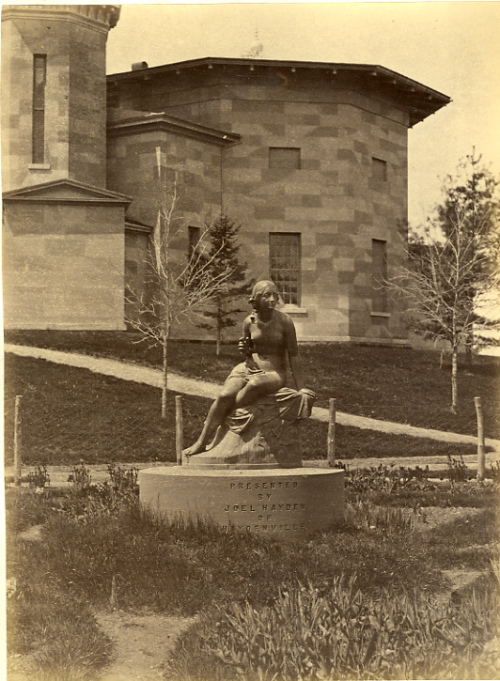
The Sabrina statue on the Amherst College campus, 1868

In 1857, Amherst College accepted a gift from Joel Hayden, future Lieutenant Governor of Massachusetts—a bronze neoclassical sculpture by William Calder Marshall of Sabrina listening to her invocation from John Milton's Comus (1634). The statue was originally installed on the town side of the Amherst campus, between North Dormitory and the Octagon.

It was not long before the scantily-clad Sabrina attracted the attention of the then all-male Amherst students. Around 1860, an industrious Amherst student, in the first of many Sabrina-inspired pranks, stole a set of undergarments from one of the nearby female colleges and used them to clothe Sabrina. The college administration harshly reprimanded the student. The next morning, Sabrina appeared with a dent in her cheek, apparently inflicted by a blow from an axe.

This first incident of chicanery and vandalism inspired a series of other events. Between 1870 and 1880 students painted the statue several times, typically alternating between white and black. The class of 1877 stole Sabrina and kept her for nearly a week before returning her. In 1878 she was transported to the roof of the Octagon building, where she was found holding a doll emblazoned "'81." The class of 1882 stole the statue to make her the guest of honor at a class banquet, a theme that was to become a recurring pattern in Sabrina pranks. The class of 1883 threw the statue down the college well, from which the administration had considerable difficulty extracting her.

These early pranks and vandalism typically pitted students against the college administration, making Sabrina an object of some controversy. In 1884, the statue was nearly destroyed when President Julius Hawley Seelye, frustrated with the pranks the statue inspired, ordered a college groundskeeper to destroy her. The groundskeeper, however, was too moved by the statue's beauty to carry out the orders and instead hid her underneath a haystack in his barn. The statue was recovered on June 19, 1887, when members of the class of 1890, motivated by rumors that the statue had not been destroyed, snuck into the barn at night, found the statue, and carted her off in a wheelbarrow.

=== Tradition of interclass rivalry ===
The tradition of odd- and even-year class members competing for possession of the statue began in earnest in 1891. The sophomore class 1893 brought Sabrina out of hiding to attend their class banquet and kept her stored safely in Boston. Yet when members of the class of 1894 caught wind of plans to bring her back to campus, one of them traveled to Springfield to intercept the package, impersonating the statue's owners and convincing the clerk to send her back to Boston under his own care. This trickery resulted in a warrant being issued for the student's arrest, at which point he boarded a steamer for Europe to wait "for the excitement to die out."

The Sabrina statue dangling from a helicopter over the Amherst College Homecoming football game in 1989

The statue remained under the control of even-year classes through 1910, when senior Max Shoop compiled and published a brief history of the pranks involving the statue. Sabrina remained a topic of significant interest at the college and beyond, generating an article in The New York Times about the statue's history in 1910, and another book on her history in 1921, as well as a brief New York Times notice about her appearance at a baseball game in 1922. Particularly notable was an appearance in 1919 that resulting in "a car chase, gun fire and a car accident that left a number of students injured."

In 1934 the statue was returned to the college, where she was installed in the memorabilia room. She was subject to many failed attempts at theft (including by students from Amherst's rival Williams College) and several acts of vandalism, including a decapitation in 1941. (Her head was welded back in place shortly thereafter.) The administration attempted to discourage further thefts by falsely claiming that the statue had been filled with concrete and welded to its base.

She remained in place until 1951, when members of the graduating class, suspecting the statue was in fact hollow, used a torch to detach Sabrina from her base and steal her again. This theft and the later appearance of the statue flying over a college baseball game the following fall generated an article in Life magazine article about the tradition in 1952.

The class of 1951 subsequently returned the statue to the college, where she remained for over 20 years, until students staged a high-profile heist in 1977. In June 1977 the statue was displayed at the 25th reunion of the class of 1952 in order to raise donations for the college. The class required that the statue be placed on display, however, so she was mounted behind plexiglass in Converse Hall. In the early hours of October 13, three masked students entered the hall, tied up the switchboard operator, and pried the statue loose. At the last minute the students enlisted Prince Albert Grimaldi (then a student at the college) so they could claim diplomatic immunity if necessary. They were apprehended less than a month later, when campus police, having learned of their plan to fly the statue over a football game, staked out the local airports.

The statue became the subject of some controversy after the college became coed, as some argued that the statue's tradition was inconsistent with the desire to become a more diverse, progressive institution.

The statue was stolen again in 1984 by Bruce Becker (class of 1980) and Rosanne Haggerty (class of 1982) and made two more flights over Amherst athletic events. The statue was returned to the college by Bruce Angiolillo (class of 1974) in 1994 for the inauguration of Tom Gerety as president of the college. She remained securely kept by the college, occasionally displayed for alumni events, for well over a decade.

In recent decades, the statue has made fewer and fewer documented appearances. The class of 2008 stole Sabrina from the College after it was kept in a campus basement for several years, recasting the statue and attaching a new hand and foot. The class of 2014 subsequently came into possession of Sabrina during 2013 reunion activities. Members of the class of 2024 obtained the statue a week before commencement. Since then, she has been spotted once in the Mead Art Museum in 2025, but remains mostly hidden from the public eye in an unknown location.

== Sabrina's Song ==
We may sing of our glorious college,
Of the old chapel steps and the bell,
Of the class-rooms just filled full of knowledge,
Which all Amherst men love so well.

But to-night as we're gather'd together,
Let us raise a strain loudly and strong
To her from whom naught can us sever,
To her who keeps watch o'er our throng.

Sabrina, fair, Sabrina, dear,
We raise to thee our hearty cheer,
Come fellows, all, and give a toast
To her we love, and love the most.
