= Cambria =

Latin name of Wales

Relief map of Wales

Cambria is a name for Wales, being the Latinised form of the Welsh name for the country, Cymru. The term was not in use during the Roman period (when Wales had not come into existence as a distinct entity) or the early medieval period. After the Anglo-Saxon settlement of much of Britain, a territorial distinction developed between the new Anglo-Saxon kingdoms (which would become England and Southern Scotland) and the remaining Celtic British kingdoms (which would become Wales and, before their absorption into England and Scotland, Cornwall to the south and Strathclyde or Hen Ogledd to the north). Latin being the primary language of scholarship in Western Christendom, medieval writers commonly used either the older term Britannia, as the territory still inhabited by Britons, or Wallia, a term derived from Old English, to refer to Wales. The term Cambria is first attested in Geoffrey of Monmouth in the 12th century as an alternative to both of these, since Britannia was now ambiguous and Wallia a foreign import, but remained rare until late in the Middle Ages.

== Etymology ==
The Welsh word Cymru (Wales), along with Cymry (Welsh people), was falsely supposed by 17th-century Celticists to be connected to the Biblical Gomer, or to the Cimbri or the Cimmerians of antiquity. In reality, it is descended from the Brittonic word combrogi, meaning 'fellow-countrymen'. The name thus conveyed something like '[Land of] the Compatriots'. The use of Cymry as a self-designation seems to have arisen in the post-Roman era, to refer collectively to the Brittonic-speaking peoples of Britain, inhabiting what are now Wales, Cornwall, Northern England, and Southern Scotland. It came into use as a self-description probably before the 7th century and is attested (as Kymry) in a praise poem to Cadwallon ap Cadfan (Moliant Cadwallon, by Afan Ferddig) c. 633. In Welsh literature, the word Cymry was used throughout the Middle Ages to describe the Welsh, though the older, more generic term Brythoniaid continued to be used to describe any of the Brittonic peoples (including the Welsh) and was the more common literary term until c. 1100. Thereafter, Cymry prevailed as a reference to the Welsh. Until c. 1560, the word was spelt Kymry or Cymry, regardless of whether it referred to the people or the country; Cymru for the country evolved later. The Latinised form Cambria emerged in the Middle Ages, first attested in, and perhaps coined by, Geoffrey of Monmouth.

== Cambria in legend ==
According to Geoffrey of Monmouth in the first part of his pseudohistory Historia Regum Britanniae ('History of the Kings of Britain'), the Trojan Brutus had three sons with his wife Innogen, among whom he divided his lands after landing in Britain and subduing Gogmagog. His eldest son, Locrinus, received the land between the rivers Humber and Severn, which he called Loegria (a Latinisation of the medieval Welsh name Lloegyr (modern Welsh: Lloegr), later to be most of England). His youngest son, Albanactus, got the lands beyond the Humber, which took from him the name of Albany (Latin Albania, not to be confused with other places of this name; Yr Alban in Welsh; later Scotland). The second son, Camber, was bequeathed everything beyond the Severn, which was hence named Cambria (later Wales and then-Brittonic areas immediately to the north and south of it). His general Corineus retained Cornwall, which was named after him.

This legend was widely accepted as fact throughout the 12th–16th centuries, though it bears no resemblance to actual political, demographic, or linguistic history.

== Legacy ==
The name Cambria lives on in some local names, e.g. Cambrian Line, Cambrian Way. It is also used internationally in geology to denote the geologic period between around 539 million years and 488.3 million years ago; in 1835, the geologist Adam Sedgwick named this geological period the Cambrian, after studying rocks of that age in Wales.

It is also a rare feminine given name.

It is also found in the name of a number of colleges stretching across north east Wales, collectively the Coleg Cambria.

It is also referenced in the well-known song "Men of Harlech," which regales an event of exceptional endurance and valor in 15th-century Wales. This song is popular with supporters of Cardiff City Football Club, and also the Welsh national team. The popular song "Wrexham is the Name" is sung by fans of Wrexham AFC and follows the same tune.

The dialogue in Shakespeare's Cymbeline uses "Cambria" rather than "Wales" throughout.

Once the name used for most of upland Wales, the term Cambrian Mountains is now more localised and includes the area from Pumlumon down to Mynydd Mallaen.

Cambria is the name of a font in Microsoft Windows.

In horticulture, Cambria orchids are those that are hybrids between genera Odontoglossum, Oncidium, Brassia, and Miltonia, all members of the subtribe Oncidiinae.

== See also ==
- Cambria (disambiguation)
- Cambrian (disambiguation)
- Cumbrian (disambiguation)
