= Walter of Oxford =

12th-century English cleric and writer

Walter of Oxford (died 1151) (Latin: Valterus Calenius) was a cleric and writer. He served as archdeacon of Oxford in the 12th century. Walter was a friend of Geoffrey of Monmouth, who claimed he got his chief source for the Historia Regum Britanniae from Walter.

In the dedication to his Historia Regum Britanniae, Geoffrey claims that while writing the book he had struggled to find material on the early Kings of the Britons. This problem had been solved when Walter gave him a "very ancient book" written in britannicus sermo (The "British" tongue, i.e. Brittonic, Welsh, or Breton). Geoffrey claims that his Historia is a faithful translation of that book into Latin. However, few modern scholars believe this to be true.

== Biography ==
Walter's name is attached to the Brut Tysilio, a variant of the Welsh chronicle Brut y Brenhinedd. According to a colophon attached to the chronicle, Walter was responsible for translating the book, which is ascribed to the 7th-century Saint Tysilio, first from Tysilio's Welsh into Latin, and then back again: "I […] translated this book from the Welsh into Latin, and in my old age have again translated it from the Latin into Welsh." Some antiquarians, notably Flinders Petrie in 1917, suggested that Walter's original Welsh source for the Brut Tysilio was in fact the "ancient book" described by Geoffrey. However, modern scholarship has established that all variants of the Brut y Brenhinedd in fact originate with Geoffrey's work, and do not represent some prior chronicle tradition. Indeed, the Brut Tysilio probably postdates Walter by centuries; Brynley F. Roberts argues that it is an "amalgam" of previous versions and came together around 1500.
