= Locrinus =

Second legendary king of the Britons

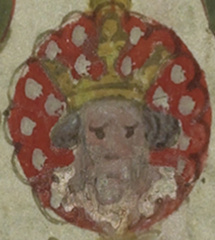
- Locrinus from the Genealogical Chronicle of the Kings of England to Edward IV (c. 1461)

King of Loegria
- Reign: fl. 1125BCE
- Predecessor: Brutus of Troy
- Successor: Queen Gwendolen

King of Albania
- Predecessor: Albanactus
- Successor: Queen Gwendolen
- Spouse: Queen Gwendolen
- Issue: Maddan; Habren
- Father: Brutus of Troy
- Mother: Innogen

Locrinus was a legendary king of the Britons, as recounted by the 12th-century chronicler Geoffrey of Monmouth in his Historia Regum Britanniae. He came to power in 1125BC.

According to Geoffrey, Locrinus was the oldest son of Brutus and Innogen, and a descendant of the Trojans through Aeneas. Following Brutus's death, Britain was divided amongst the three sons, with Locrinus receiving the portion roughly equivalent to England except for Devon and Cornwall, Albanactus receiving Scotland (Albany), and Kamber receiving Wales (Cymru). Locrinus ruled a portion of Britain called Loegria, named after him, which had roughly the boundaries of modern-day England, other than Devon and Cornwall. He reigned 10 years, most of which were peaceful.

He avenged his brother Albanactus's death at the hands of Humber the Hun by allying with his other brother, Kamber, and fighting Humber to the banks of a river where he drowned. The river was named Humber after this battle. Locrinus divided up the spoils of war with his allies, only keeping gold and silver found on their ships for himself. He also took the daughter of the king of the Germans, Estrildis, whom the Huns had captured. This angered Corineus, an ally of his father Brutus, who had arranged a marriage between Locrinus and his own daughter, Queen Gwendolen. Locrinus submitted and married Gwendolen but still secretly loved Estrildis, whom he locked in a cave beneath Trinovantum (London) for seven years.

Locrinus became the father of a girl, Habren, by Estrildis, and a boy, Maddan, by Gwendolen. Soon after Maddan's birth, Locrinus sent him off to Corineus, the child's grandfather. When Corineus finally died, Locrinus left Gwendolen and took Estrildis as his queen. Gwendolen went to Cornwall and assembled an army to harass Locrinus. The two armies met near the River Stour and there Locrinus was killed. His wife, Gwendolen, ruled after his death.

== Later tradition ==
In the 13th century Prose Merlin, Locrinus is called Logryn, and arrives in Britain a long time after the death of Brutus. He "a-mended gretly the Citee [London], and made towres and stronge walles enbateiled", and then renamed it from New Troy to Logres, which it continued to be called until after the death of King Arthur.

Locrinus is the subject of the anonymous Elizabethan play Locrine, published in 1595 as "Newly set forth, overseen and corrected by W.S.," on account of which it was later included in the Shakespeare Apocrypha.

== Notes ==
Legendary titles
Preceded by Brutus I	King of Loegria	Succeeded by Gwendolen
Preceded by Albanactus	King of Albania	Succeeded by Gwendolen
