= King Camber =

Legendary first king of Cambria (Wales)

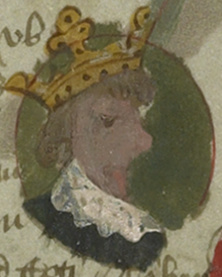
- Camber from the Genealogical Chronicle of the Kings of England to Edward IV (c. 1461)

King of Kambria
- Predecessor: Brutus of Troy
- Successor: Queen Gwendolen
- Father: Brutus of Troy
- Mother: Innogen

Attributed arms of Camber from the Book of Baglan

Camber, also Kamber, was the legendary first king of Cambria, according to the Geoffrey of Monmouth in the first part of his influential 12th-century pseudohistory Historia Regum Britanniae. According to Geoffrey, Cambria, the classical name for Wales, was named for him.

== Legendary genealogy and life ==
Camber was the second son of Brutus and Innogen, and a descendant of Aeneas of Troy. Upon his father's death he was given Cambria, while his younger brother Albanactus got Alba (the territory corresponding to modern Scotland; from Welsh Yr Alban) and his older brother Locrinus received Logres (corresponding to England except for Cornwall; from Welsh Lloegr) and the title of King of the Britons. When Albanactus was murdered by Humber, King of the Huns, Camber joined Locrinus in attacking and defeating him.

== Lack of historicity ==
Like many of the characters reported by Geoffrey, Camber has no historical basis but is the product of Geoffrey of Monmouth's imagination, invented largely for political ends within the contemporary Anglo-Norman world.

== In the Book of Baglan ==
The Book of Baglan provides a list of descendants of Camber, starting with his eldest son Gorbonian, who became duke of Cornwall and chief governor of Cambria, and his second son Albon, governor of North Cambria and earl of Ewias and Urtchingfild. Through Gorbonion, Dyfnwal Moelmud was descended, who became king of Britain, and eventually the line passes to Henry VII. It also gives attributed arms to Camber, "2 lions rampant, vert."

Legendary titles
Preceded by Brutus I	King of Kambria	Succeeded by Gwendolen
