= Historia Regum Britanniae =

Pseudohistorical account of British history (c.1136)

Historia regum Britanniae
- The History of the Kings of Britain
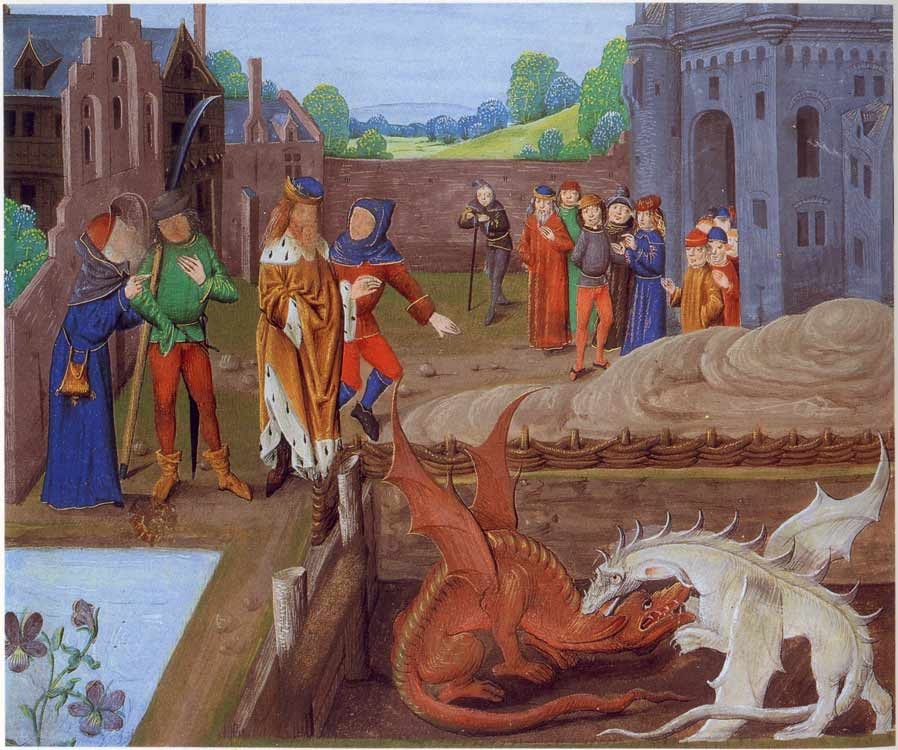
- Illumination from a 15th-century manuscript of Historia regum Britanniae showing Vortigern and Ambros watching the fight between two dragons.
- Author(s): Geoffrey of Monmouth
- Ascribed to: Geoffrey claims to have translated "a very ancient book in the British tongue" into Latin
- Dedicated to: Robert, Earl of Gloucester and Waleran, Count of Meulan
- Language: Latin
- Date: c. 1136
- Manuscript(s): 215 manuscripts, notably Bern, Burgerbibliothek, MS. 568
- Genre: Pseudohistory
- Subject: Legendary kings of the Britons
- Setting: Mainly Great Britain
- Personages: See, e.g., List of legendary kings of Britain
- Text: Historia regum Britanniae at Wikisource
- Adapted and translated, e.g., by Wace, Layamon and the authors of the Brut y Brenhinedd.

De gestis Britonum (On the Deeds of the Britons), commonly known as Historia regum Britanniae (The History of the Kings of Britain), is a fictitious account of British history written around 1136 by the Welsh cleric Geoffrey of Monmouth. It chronicles the lives of the kings of the Britons over the course of two thousand years, beginning with the Trojans founding the British nation and continuing until the Anglo-Saxons assumed control of much of Britain around the 7th century. It is one of the central pieces of the Matter of Britain.

Although taken as historical truth until the 16th century, it is now considered to have no value as history. Much is apocryphal, and when events described, such as Julius Caesar's invasions of Britain, can be corroborated from contemporary histories, Geoffrey's account can be seen to be wildly inaccurate. It remains, however, a valuable piece of medieval literature, which contains the earliest known version of the story of King Lear and his three daughters, and helped popularise the legend of King Arthur.

== Contents ==
Geoffrey starts the book with a short dedication. He claims that he was given a source for the time period by Archdeacon Walter of Oxford, who presented him with a "certain very ancient book written in the British language" from which he has translated his history.

=== Books 1–3 ===
The Historia begins with the Trojan hero Aeneas, who, according to the Aeneid, settled in Italy after the Trojan War. His great-grandson Brutus is banished for accidental patricide, and, after a period of wandering, is directed by the goddess Diana to settle on an island in the western ocean. Brutus lands at Totnes and names the island "Britain" after himself, defeating the previous giant inhabitants. He establishes the city that was eventually renamed London. After Brutus' death, the island is divided into three kingdoms, each given to one of his sons: Loegria (England) to Locrinus, Cambria (Wales) to Camber, and Alba (Scotland) to Albanactus.

Centuries later, Locrinus' descendant King Leir divides his kingdom among his three daughters, Goneril, Regan and Cordelia. However, because of a slight, he gives Cordelia no land, whereupon she departs for Gaul. Leir later regrets his actions towards Cordelia and travels to Gaul. Cordelia helps raise a Gaulish army for Leir, who returns to Britain, defeats his sons-in-law and regains the kingdom. Cordelia inherits the throne and rules for five years until Cunedagius and Marganus (sons of her two sisters) rebel against her. They imprison Cordelia; grief-stricken, she kills herself. Ending a civil war, Cunedagius eventually kills Marganus in Wales.

In a later era, Dunvallo Molmutius, the son of Cloten, the King of Cornwall, establishes his rule over the whole island. He is said to have established the Molmutine Laws. Dunvallo's sons, Belinus and Brennius, fight a civil war before being reconciled by their mother, and proceed to sack Rome. Victorious, Brennius remains in Italy, while Belinus returns to rule Britain. Numerous brief accounts of successive kings follow.

=== Books 4–6 ===
After his conquest of Gaul, Julius Caesar looks over the sea and resolves to order Britain to swear obedience and pay tribute to Rome. Cassivellaunus pays tribute and makes peace with Caesar, who then returns to Gaul. He dies and is succeeded by his nephew Tenvantius. Tenvantius' grandson Guiderius refuses to pay tribute to emperor Claudius, who then invades Britain. After Guiderius is killed in battle with the Romans, his brother Arvirargus eventually agrees to submit to Rome, and is given the hand of Claudius's daughter Genvissa in marriage.

The line of British kings continues under Roman rule. When Octavius passes the crown to his son-in-law Maximianus, his nephew Conan Meriadoc is given rule of Brittany to compensate him for not succeeding. After a long period of Roman rule, the Romans decide they no longer wish to defend the island and depart. The Britons are immediately besieged by attacks from Picts, Scots and Danes. In desperation the Britons send letters to the general of the Roman forces, asking for help, but receive no reply.

The Britons ask the King of Brittany, Aldroenus, descended from Conan, to rule them. However, Aldroenus instead sends his brother Constantine to rule the Britons. After Constantine's death, Vortigern assists his eldest son Constans in succeeding, before enabling their murder and coming to power. Constantine's remaining sons Aurelius Ambrosius and Uther are too young to rule and are taken to safety in Brittany. Vortigern invites the Saxons under Hengist and Horsa to fight for him as mercenaries, but they rise against him. He loses control of much of his land and encounters Merlin.

=== Book Seven: The Prophecies of Merlin ===
At this point Geoffrey abruptly pauses his narrative by inserting a series of prophecies attributed to Merlin. Some of the prophecies act as an epitome of upcoming chapters of the Historia, while others are veiled allusions to historical people and events of the Norman world in the 11th–12th centuries. The remainder are obscure.

=== Books 8–12 ===
After Aurelius Ambrosius defeats and kills Vortigern, becoming king, Britain remains in a state of war under him and his brother Uther. At one point during the continuous string of battles, Ambrosius takes ill and Uther must lead the army for him. A comet taking the form of a dragon's head (pendragon) appears in the night sky, which Merlin interprets as a sign that Ambrosius is dead and that Uther will be victorious and succeed him.

But another enemy strikes, forcing Uther to make war again. This time he is temporarily defeated, gaining final victory only with the help of Duke Gorlois of Cornwall. But while celebrating this victory with Gorlois, he falls in love with the duke's wife, Igerna. This leads to war between Uther Pendragon and Gorlois of Cornwall, during which Uther clandestinely lies with Igerna through the magic of Merlin. Arthur is conceived that night. Then Gorlois is killed and Uther marries Igerna. Later Uther Pendragon is killed by the Saxons, Uther's son Arthur assumes the throne and inflicts a severe enough defeat against the Saxons that they cease to be a threat until after his death. He conquers most of northern Europe and ushers in a period of peace and prosperity that lasts until the Romans, led by Lucius Hiberius, demands that Britain once again pay tribute to Rome. Arthur defeats Lucius in Gaul, intending to become Emperor, but in his absence, his nephew Mordred seduces and marries Guinevere and seizes the throne.

Arthur returns and Mordred is killed at the Battle of Camlann, but, Arthur is mortally wounded, he is carried off to the isle of Avalon, and hands the kingdom to his cousin Constantine, son of Cador and Duke of Cornwall. The Saxons return after Arthur's death, but would not end the line of British kings until the death of Cadwallader. Cadwallader is forced to flee Britain and is told by an angel that Britons will no longer rule. He dies in Rome, leaving his son and nephew to rule the remaining Britons, driven into Wales. The Saxon Athelstan becomes King of Loegria.

== Sources ==
Geoffrey claimed to have translated the Historia into Latin from "a very ancient book in the British tongue", given to him by Walter, Archdeacon of Oxford. However, no modern scholars take this claim seriously. Much of the work appears to be derived from Gildas's 6th-century De Excidio et Conquestu Britanniae, Bede's 8th-century Historia ecclesiastica gentis Anglorum, the 9th-century Historia Brittonum ascribed to Nennius, the 10th-century Annales Cambriae, medieval Welsh genealogies (such as the Harleian Genealogies) and king-lists, the poems of Taliesin, the Welsh tale Culhwch and Olwen, and some of the medieval Welsh saints' lives, expanded and turned into a continuous narrative by Geoffrey's own imagination.

== Medieval influence ==
The medieval works are deemed to be drawn from traditional Celtic materials and are supposed to have deep roots, to the point that the publications are considered reliable and not the imagination of one man, Geoffrey. However, since Geoffrey's publication of the Historia Regum Britanniae (De gestis Britonum), his work has been downgraded due to factual errors that were once recorded for the publication of his work i.e. observations to do with Stonehenge. It was merely a century later that Geoffrey's 'The History of Kings' was rewritten and translated in Cistercian monasteries such as Whitland, St Davids Cathedral and later the Strata Florida Abbey in Wales, then translated by Hywel Fychan ap Hywel Goch of Buellt into Latin-Welsh during 1250 in the manuscript Chronicle of Kings (Welsh: Brut y Brenhinedd). Both of these are part of the medieval manuscripts of Wales (Wales Library collection), several of which are kept at the National Library of Wales in Aberystwyth today. Geoffrey's work was to do with the history of the British kings who hailed from Trojan dynasties, specifically from after the Trojan War (fall of Troy). Then, the books detail the Welsh medieval era during the Kingdom of Gwynedd, from around 682, culminating in the life of Llywelyn ap Gruffudd until 1282; it was Prince Llywelyn II who referenced Geoffrey's work. Another king to cite the books was Prince Owain Glyndwr, he spoke of the Galfridian works of Geoffrey to Robert III of Scotland. Glyndwr referenced himself as the Prince of Wales and a direct descendant and heir of the son of Brutus of Troy, King Camber, and also of the later medieval King Cadwaladr. The work of Geoffrey of Monmouth was considered to take inspiration from the Latin publication of the life of 11th and 12th century King Gruffudd ap Cynan (written from 1137), finished by Gerald of Wales. Gruffudd's biography has a detailed list of the Kings of Wales with his ancestry going back to Brutus of Troy. However, Gruffudd's descent was from Locrinus of Loegria (England), and not his brother King Camber of Wales. Otherwise, it is said that in the 8th century, the Welsh monk Nennius wrote the now questioned ancestry list, and that it was Geoffrey who published the king list accepted to date.

In an exchange of manuscript material for their own histories, Robert of Torigny gave Henry of Huntington a copy of Historia Regum Britanniae, which both Robert and Henry used uncritically as authentic history and subsequently used in their own works, by which means some of Geoffrey's fictions became embedded in popular history. The history of Geoffrey forms the basis for much British lore and literature, as well as a rich source of material for Welsh bards. It became tremendously popular during the High Middle Ages, revolutionising views of British history before and during the Anglo-Saxon period, despite the criticism of such writers as Gerald of Wales, and William of Newburgh who stated "no one but a person ignorant of ancient history [can doubt] how impertinently and impudently he falsifies in every respect." . The prophecies of Merlin in particular were often drawn upon in later periods, for instance by both sides in the issue of English influence over Scotland under Edward I and his successors.

The Historia was quickly translated into Norman verse by Wace (the Roman de Brut) in 1155. Wace's version was in turn translated into Middle English verse by Layamon (the Brut) in the early 13th century. In the second quarter of the 13th century, a version in Latin verse, the Gesta Regum Britanniae, was produced by William of Rennes. Material from Geoffrey was incorporated into a large variety of Anglo-Norman and Middle English prose compilations of historical material from the 13th century onward.

Geoffrey was translated into a number of different Welsh prose versions by the end of the 13th century, collectively known as Brut y Brenhinedd. One variant of the Brut y Brenhinedd, the so-called Brut Tysilio, was proposed in 1917 by the archaeologist William Flinders Petrie to be the ancient British book that Geoffrey translated, although the Brut itself claims to have been translated from Latin by Walter of Oxford, based on his own earlier translation from Welsh to Latin. Geoffrey's work is greatly important because it brought the Welsh culture into British society and made it acceptable. It is also the first record we have of the great figure King Lear, and the beginning of the mythical King Arthur figure.

For centuries, the Historia was accepted at face value, and much of its material was incorporated into Holinshed's 16th-century Chronicles. Modern historians have regarded the Historia as a work of fiction with some factual information contained within. John Morris in The Age of Arthur calls it a "deliberate spoof", although this is based on misidentifying Walter, archdeacon of Oxford, as Walter Map, a satirical writer who lived a century later.

It continues to have an influence on popular culture. For example, Mary Stewart's Merlin Trilogy and the TV miniseries Merlin both contain large elements taken from the Historia.

== Manuscript tradition and textual history ==
Two hundred and fifteen medieval manuscripts of the Historia survive, dozens of them copied before the end of the 12th century. Even among the earliest manuscripts a large number of textual variants, such as the so-called "First Variant", can be discerned. These are reflected in the three possible prefaces to the work and in the presence or absence of certain episodes and phrases. Certain variants may be due to "authorial" additions to different early copies, but most probably reflect early attempts to alter, add to or edit the text. The task of disentangling these variants and establishing Geoffrey's original text is long and complex, and the extent of the difficulties surrounding the text has been established only recently.

The variant title Historia regum Britanniae was introduced in the Middle Ages, and this became the most common form in the modern period. A critical edition of the work published in 2007, however, demonstrated that the most accurate manuscripts refer to the work as De gestis Britonum, and that this was the title Geoffrey himself used to refer to the work.

== See also ==
- List of legendary kings of Britain

== Bibliography ==
- John Jay Parry and Robert Caldwell. "Geoffrey of Monmouth" in Arthurian Literature in the Middle Ages, Roger S. Loomis (ed.). Oxford: Clarendon Press. 1959. 72–93. ISBN 0-19-811588-1
- Brynley F. Roberts. "Geoffrey of Monmouth and Welsh Historical Tradition," Nottingham Medieval Studies, 20 (1976), 29–40.
- J. S. P. Tatlock. The Legendary History of Britain: Geoffrey of Monmouth's Historia Regum Britanniae and Its Early Vernacular Versions. Berkeley: University of California Press, 1950.
- Michael A. Faletra, trans. and ed. The History of the Kings of Britain. Geoffrey of Monmouth. Peterborough, Ont.; Plymouth: Broadview Editions, 2008.
- N. Wright, ed. The Historia Regum Britannie of Geoffrey of Monmouth. 1, A Single-Manuscript Edition from Bern, Burgerbibliothek, MS. 568. Cambridge: D. S. Brewer, 1984.
- N. Wright, ed. The Historia Regum Britannie of Geoffrey of Monmouth. 2, The First Variant Version: A Critical Edition. Cambridge: D. S. Brewer, 1988.
- J. C. Crick. The Historia Regum Britannie of Geoffrey of Monmouth. 3, A Summary Catalogue of the Manuscripts. Cambridge: D. S. Brewer, 1989.
- J. C. Crick. The Historia Regum Britannie of Geoffrey of Monmouth. 4, Dissemination and Reception in the Later Middle Ages. Cambridge: D. S. Brewer, 1991.
- J. Hammer, ed. Historia Regum Britanniae: A Variant Version Edited from Manuscripts. Cambridge, MA: 1951.
- A. Griscom, ed., and J. R. Ellis, trans. The Historia Regum Britanniae of Geoffrey of Monmouth with Contributions to the Study of its Place in Early British History. London: Longmans, Green and Co., 1929.
- Reeve, Michael D., ed. (2007). Geoffrey of Monmouth. The History of the Kings of Britain: An Edition and Translation of De gestis Britonum (Historia regum Britanniae). Arthurian studies. Vol. 69. Translated by Wright, Neil. Woodbridge: Boydell Press. ISBN 978-1-84383-206-5.
- M. D. Reeve, "The Transmission of the Historia Regum Britanniae," Journal of Medieval Latin 1 (1991), 73–117.
- Edmond Faral. La Légende arthurienne. Études et documents, 3 vols. Bibliothèque de l'École des Hautes Études. Paris, 1929.
- R. W. Leckie. The Passage of Dominion. Geoffrey of Monmouth and the Periodization of Insular History in the Twelfth Century. Toronto: Toronto University Press, 1981.
