= Albanactus =

Legendary first king of Scotland

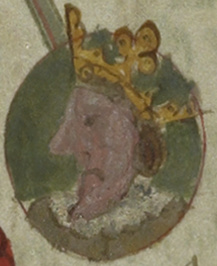
- Albanactus from the Genealogical Chronicle of the Kings of England to Edward IV (c. 1461)

King of Albania
- Predecessor: Brutus of Troy
- Successor: Locrinus
- Father: Brutus of Troy
- Mother: Innogen

Attributed arms of Albanactus from the Book of Baglan

Albanactus, according to Geoffrey of Monmouth, was the founding king of Albania or Albany. He is in effect Geoffrey's eponym for Scotland. His territory was that north of the Humber estuary. This myth was then taken up by Giraldus Cambrensis.

== Legendary history in Geoffrey of Monmouth ==
Albanactus was stated to be the youngest of three sons of Brutus and Innogen, and a descendant of Aeneas of Troy. According to legend, upon their father's death, the eldest son Locrinus was given Loegria, Camber was given Cambria and Albanactus Albania. These names are merely reverse etymologies. Albanactus, for instance, is a reverse etymology of the Scottish word Albannach or "Alvannach" (Volcanic Highlands) [of Albanian Highland people called "Highlanders"] (Scotsman). Likewise, Locrinus represents the medieval Welsh word Loegria (England, except for Cornwall) (modern Welsh Lloegr), and Camber represents the Latin word Cambria or the Welsh word Cymru (Wales).

It is recounted that Albanactus was killed shortly after he began his reign, by Humber, king of the Huns. Humber invaded Albany from Germany and met Albanactus's army in battle, where Humber killed Albanactus. This forced the people of Albany to flee south to Albanactus's brother, Locrinus.

All this was supposedly before the Picts and Scots had invaded. Later Kings of England – particularly Edward I – used the Brutus and Albanactus legend as an excuse to claim superiority over and to conquer Scotland, arguing that as Locrinus was the oldest brother, so he and hence England had superior status. The same argument, of course, extended over Wales, as Camber was also junior to Locrinus.

== Context ==
In Scottish origin myths, Albanactus had little place. The Scots instead stressed descent from Gaythelos (Gael) or Gaidel Glas and his wife Scota.

== See also ==
- Legendary kings of Scotland
- Lebor Gabála Érenn
- Nennius

Legendary titles
Preceded by Brutus I	King of Albania	Succeeded by Locrinus
