= Logres =

Realm of King Arthur

- Matter of Britain location
- Genre: Arthurian legend

In-universe information
- Type: Realm and/or city
- Character: King Arthur

Logres (also Logris or Loegria, among other forms) is King Arthur's realm in the Matter of Britain. The geographical area referred to by the name is south and eastern England. However, Arthurian writers such as Chrétien de Troyes and Wolfram von Eschenbach have differed in their interpretations of this.

== Etymology ==
It derives from the medieval Welsh word Lloegyr, a name of uncertain origin referring to South and Eastern England (Lloegr is modern Welsh for all of England).

== Geographical area in various Arthurian works ==
In Arthurian contexts, "Logres" is often used to describe the Brittonic territory roughly corresponding to the borders of England before the area was taken by the Anglo-Saxons. According to Geoffrey of Monmouth's influential but largely fictional history Historia Regum Britanniae, the realm was named after the legendary king Locrinus, the oldest son of Brutus of Troy. In his Historia, Geoffrey uses the word "Loegria" to describe a province containing most of England excluding Cornwall and possibly Northumberland, as in this example from section iv.20 (from the Penguin Classics translation by Lewis Thorpe):

Parishes were apportioned off, Deira being placed under the Metropolitan of York, along with Albany, for the great River Humber divides these two from Loegria. Loegria itself was placed under the Metropolitan of London, along with Cornwall. The Severn divides these last two provinces from Kambria or Wales, which last was placed under the City of Legions.

It was described by Chrétien de Troyes as "The Land of Ogres" (l'Ogres) in his poem Perceval, the Story of the Grail. In various French works, Logres appears as the name of the land or the capital city (otherwise Camelot), its inhabitants can be known as either Loegrwys or Lloegrwys. Translating and compiling such texts for his Le Morte d'Arthur, Thomas Malory conflated Logres with his contemporary Kingdom of England and usually used just "England" instead, except for the names of some of the Knights of the Round Table. In some medieval German works, Logres is the personal domain of Gawain, as established by Wolfram von Eschenbach.

== Use in modern fiction ==
The name "Logres" is also used in several works of modern fantasy set in Britain; for example, C. S. Lewis's That Hideous Strength, Susan Cooper's Over Sea, Under Stone, Charles Williams' Taliessin Through Logres, and Fate/Grand Order's character Lord Logres.

== See also ==
- Albion
- Prydain
