= Sisillius =

Sisillius (Welsh: Saessyllt) was the name of three legendary Kings of the Britons as accounted by Geoffrey of Monmouth:

- Sisillius, one of the younger sons of Ebraucus
- Sisillius I, successor of King Gurgustius
- Sisillius II, son of King Guithelin and Queen Marcia
- Sisillius III, successor of King Oenus
