= Peredurus =

Legendary king of the Britons

Peredurus (Welsh: Peredur) is a legendary king of the Britons in Geoffrey of Monmouth's pseudohistorical chronicle Historia Regum Britanniae. According to Geoffrey, he was the youngest son of King Morvidus and brother of Gorbonianus, Archgallo, Elidurus, and Ingenius. He came to power in 317 BC.

Following the return of Elidurus to the kingship of Britain, Peredurus joined with his brother Ingenius and attacked their older brother. They succeeded in capturing him and locked him in a guarded tower in Trinovantum. Instead of fighting over who ruled the island, they split the island giving all land north and east of the River Humber, including Albany, to Peredurus, and all land to the south and west to Ingenius. He ruled his portion of the island for seven years then Ingenius died and he was awarded with the entire kingdom. He ruled moderately and was considered better than his brothers before him. Few remembered Elidurus locked in the tower until death finally took Peredurus. Elidurus returned once more as king following Peredurus's death. His son Runo later became king of Britain.

== See also ==
- Peredur

Legendary titles
Preceded by Elidurus	King of North Britain	Succeeded by Elidurus
Preceded by Ingenius	King of South Britain	Succeeded by Elidurus
