= Elidurus =

Legendary figure

Elidurus the Dutiful (Welsh: Elidyr map Morydd) was a legendary king of the Britons as recounted by Geoffrey of Monmouth. He reigned in the late fourth century BC. He was the third son of King Morvidus and brother of Gorbonianus, Archgallo, Ingenius, and Peredurus.

Elidurus became king following the deposition of his brother, Archgallo. He found his brother wandering in a forest five years after Elidurus was crowned. He embraced him as a brother and took Archgallo in secrecy to a nearby city. Faking a sickness, he summoned all the nobles of the kingdom to that city to visit him. Once there, Elidurus demanded they all repledge their allegiance to Archgallo under penalty of death. Once done, Elidurus took Archgallo to York and removed his own crown and reinstated Archgallo as king of the Britons. For this, he was surnamed the Dutiful.

Ten years later, Archgallo died and Elidurus became king once again. He reigned for a few years in the manner of his eldest brother, Gorbonianus. Soon after, though, his two younger brothers, Ingenius and Peredurus, built armies and attacked Elidurus. They seized him and locked him in a guarded tower in Trinovantum. He remained locked in the tower for more than seven years.

When his youngest brother, Peredurus, finally died, the realm returned to Elidurus for a third time. He reigned for a short while in justice and virtue then died. He was succeeded by an unnamed son of Gorbonianus. His son, Gerennus, would later become king of Britain.

Legendary titles
| Preceded by Archgallo | King of Britain first reign | Succeeded by Archgallo |
| Preceded by Archgallo | King of Britain second reign | Succeeded by Ingenius (South Britain); Peredurus (North Britain) |
| Preceded by Peredurus | King of Britain third reign | Succeeded by A son of Gorbonianus |
