= Ingenius of Britain =

Legendary king of the Britons

Ingenius (Welsh: Owain map Morydd) is a legendary king of the Britons as recounted by Geoffrey of Monmouth's pseudohistorical work Historia Regum Britanniae (The History of the Kings of Britain), written c. 1138 CE. Ingenius was the fourth son of King Morvidus and the brother of Gorbonianus, Archgallo, Elidurus, and Peredurus. He came to power in 317BC.

Following the return of Elidurus to the kingship of Britain, Ingenius joined with his brother Peredurus and attacked their older brother. They succeeded in capturing him and locked him in a guarded tower in Trinovantum. Instead of fighting over who ruled the island, they split the island, giving all land south and west of the River Humber to Ingenius and all land to the north and east, including Albany, to Peredurus. He ruled his portion of the island for seven years then died, giving the whole of the island to his brother, Peredurus. His son Idvallo would later become king of Britain.

Legendary titles
Preceded by Elidurus	King of South Britain	Succeeded by Peredurus
