= North–South divide in the United Kingdom =

The North–South divide in the United Kingdom may refer to:

- North–South divide in England
  - Northern England
  - Southern England
- North Britain and South Britain
- North–South divide in Scotland
  - Scottish Highlands
  - Scottish Lowlands
- North–South divide in Wales
  - North Wales
  - South Wales

== See also ==
- North–South divide in Ireland
