= Sisillius I =

King of Britain
- Reign: c. 753 BC
- Predecessor: Gurgustius
- Successor: Jago
- Issue: Kimarcus
- Father: Gurgustius

Sisillius I (Welsh: Seisyll) was a legendary king of the Britons as accounted by Geoffrey of Monmouth. He came to power in 753 BC.

He was preceded by Gurgustius and succeeded by Jago. He was the father of Kimarcus, who became king of the Britons after Jago, and shares his name with one of the sons of Ebraucus, and two later kings of the same name (Sisillius II and Sisillius III). Geoffrey has nothing to say of him beyond this.

== Relation to Jago ==
In the Historia Regum Britanniae, Sisillius is succeeded by Jago, who the Latin text describes as "Iago Gurgustii nepos". This is generally interpreted as meaning "Jago, Gurgustius's nephew", but could mean "Jago, Gurgustius's grandson" instead.

As a result, most later sources assume that Jago was Sisillius' cousin, but the Black Book of Basingwerk, following the latter interpretation, called Jago the son of Sisillius (and so grandson of Gurgustius through Sisillius).

== Notes ==
Legendary titles
Preceded by Gurgustius	King of Britain	Succeeded by Jago
