= Caff (disambiguation) =

A caff is a small, cheap British eatery or British cafe.

It may also refer to:

- Cap of Britain, a legendary king of the Britons
- Caff Records, a British record label in existence between 1989 and 1992

== See also ==
- CAFF (disambiguation)
