= Brenhinoedd y Saeson =

Three 14th-century Welsh chronicles

Brenhinoedd y Saeson (also Brenhinedd y Saesson) is the medieval title of a Middle Welsh annalistic chronicle. The name means 'the kings of the English'.

It is known from two medieval manuscripts:

- London, British Library, Cotton MS Cleopatra B V, written at Valle Crucis Abbey around 1330. It was copied by the same scribe who wrote the continuation of Brut y Tywysogion in Aberystwyth, National Library of Wales, Peniarth 20. The chronicle is incomplete and finishes in 1198.
- Aberystwyth, National Library of Wales, MS. 7006D (Llyfr Du Basing, 'The Black Book of Basingwerk'), written in or soon after 1461 (where the chronicle ends). The principal scribe was the poet Gutun Owain, who died c. 1500, and whose datable manuscript output lies between 1456 and 1497.

Brenhinoedd y Saeson is closely related to the chronicle known as Brut y Tywysogion, known in two version named after the manuscripts Peniarth 20 and Oxford, Jesus College 111 (The Red Book of Hergest). Brenhinoedd y Saeson's main source is the Latin chronicle related to Annales Cambriae from which the two versions of Brut y Tywysogion derive. But it also includes material drawn from English sources. These include a version of the Annals of Winchester, William of Malmesbury's Gesta Regum Anglorum and (indirectly) Henry of Huntingdon's Historia Anglorum. It also draws on materials from the Welsh Marches, including a version of the annals known from the Breviate of Domesday manuscript (London, National Archives, MS E. 164/1) which also contains the so-called Breviate Chronicle (known as the B-text of Annales Cambriae).

As a result, Brenhinoedd y Saeson contains more material relating to the English kings than the two versions of Brut y Tywysogion.

The annals in the Black Book of Basingwerk are dependent on the Cotton Cleopatra version up to the latter's final entry in 1198. They then draw on both the Peniarth 20 and Red Book of Hergest versions of Brut y Tywysogion to 1282. The continuation of the Peniarth 20 Brut y Tywysogion is the source for the years up to 1331, after which the material is probably the work of Gutun Owain himself.

== Naming ==
Brenhinoedd y Saeson is so named in the two medieval manuscripts in which it survives. David Dumville has argued that as Brut y Tywysogion is not given that name in medieval manuscripts, the name Brenhinoedd y Saeson should be used not only of the chronicle found in Cotton Cleopatra B V and the Black Book of Basingwerk, but also for the two versions of Brut y Tywysogion as well. In general academic usage, however, it is usual to differentiate between Brenhinoedd y Saeson and Brut y Tywysogion.

== Bibliography ==
- Dumville, D avid N. 2005 Brenhinoedd y Saeson, 'The Kings of the English', A.D. 682–954: Texts P, R, S in Parallel. Aberdeen: Department of History, University of Aberdeen.
- Jones, T. 1953 Brut y Tywysogion. Darlith Agoriadol. Cardiff
- Jones, T. 1941 Brut y Tywysogyon. Peniarth MS. 20. Cardiff: University of Wales Press
- Jones, T. 1952 Brut y Tywysogyon ... Peniarth MS. 20 Version. Cardiff: University of Wales Press
- Jones, T. 1955, 2nd edn, 1973 Brut y Tywysogyon ... Red Book of Hergest Version. Cardiff: University of Wales Press
- Jones, T. 1971, Brenhinedd y Saesson ... British Museum Cotton MS Cleopatra B.5.. Cardiff: University of Wales Press
- Lloyd, J. E. 1928 'The Welsh chronicles', Proceedings of the British Academy 14 pp. 369–91.
- Parry, John Jay (ed. & transl.) 1937 Brut y Brenhinedd. Cotton Cleopatra Version. Cambridge, MA.
- Roberts, Brynley F. (ed.) 1971 Brut y Brenhinedd, Llanstephan MS. 1 Version, Selections. Dublin: DIAS
- Smith, J. Beverley. 2008. Historical Writing in Medieval Wales: the Composition of Brenhinedd y Saesson. Studia Celtica, 42, 55–86.
