= SS North Britain =

Two steamships operated by North Shipping Ltd were named North Britain.

- SS North Britain (1940), torpedoed and sunk by U-707 on 5 May 1943
- SS North Britain (1945), managed from 1947, bought in 1948 and sold to Hong Kong in 1962.
