= Sisillius III =

Legendary king of the Britons

Sisillius III (Welsh: Saesyllt) was a legendary king of the Britons as accounted by Geoffrey of Monmouth. He reigned approximately 173–167 BC.

== History ==
He was preceded by Oenus and succeeded by Beldgabred. He shares his name with one of the sons of Ebraucus and his ancestors Sisillius II and Sisillius I.

Legendary titles
Preceded by Oenus	King of Britain	Succeeded by Beldgabred
