= Thomas Blenerhasset =

English poet and writer

Thomas Blenerhasset (c.1550–1624) was an English poet and writer on Ireland.

== Life ==
He was a younger son of William Blenerhasset of Horsford Park, near Norwich, who died in 1598. He was probably born about 1550, and was, according to his own account, educated at Cambridge without taking a degree. It is thought that he probably entered Trinity Hall, in 1564.

Blenerhasset subsequently entered the army, and was stationed for some years as captain at Guernsey Castle. He took service in Ireland in the reign of Elizabeth I, and commanded an ill-equipped militia unit in the defence of Munster. In 1610 he was one of the undertakers for the plantation of Ulster. In 1611 he received 2,000 acres (810 ha) at Clancally (barony of Clankelly) in Fermanagh, and in 1612 he, with 39 others, appealed to the lord-deputy, Sir Arthur Chichester, to grant them jointly a part of County Sligo, 60,000 acres (24,000 ha) in Fermanagh, and some neighbouring territory, on their undertaking to expend £40,000 on the land, and to settle on it 1,000 "able men". With his signature to this appeal Blenerhasset describes himself as of Horsford, Norfolk.

The 1618 survey by Nicholas Pynnar reported that Blenerhasset had founded a village at Ederney. He built Castlehasset on Lough Erne, a stone house and bawn known later as Crevenish Castle; and died there on 11 March 1624. That year, he was stated to own the barony of "Lurge" (Lurg) and two proportions of "Eddernagh" (Edernagh) and Tullenageane in Fermanagh. Settlements at Ederney and Kesh developed on the latter holdings.

== Works ==
Blenerhasset's major work was an expansion of The Mirror for Magistrates. He was not linked to the original group of contributors to this collective work in the 1550s and early 1560s, around William Baldwin the poet and Thomas Marshe the printer; his "second part" to the verse collection was traditionally treated as an outlier, but by the end of the 20th century it had received more critical attention. By way of dedication, Blenerhasset made commendatory remarks about Thomas Leighton, Governor of Guernsey where he was stationed. The London printer, Richard Webster, was a minor figure in the trade.

=== The Second Part (1578) of the Mirror for Magistrates ===
In 1574 John Higgins wrote a further series of poems to add to the original Mirror for Magistrates, on legends set in earlier history, and was entitled The First Parte of the Mirror for Magistrates, and was reprinted in 1575. Blenerhasset's contribution to the Mirror was a continuation of Higgins's book, "from the conquest of Cæsar unto the commyng of Duke William the Conqueror". Higgins had varied the original frame story, by using a dream vision. Blenerhasset replaced it by an allegory, in the form of figures Inquisition and Memory.

Blenerhasset wrote his work on Guernsey, in 1577. Ostensibly, he intended the work for the private reading of a friend. It was published in London in 1578 under the title of The Second Parte of the Mirror for Magistrates. A letter was prefixed, containing some autobiographical facts, and addressed by the author to the friend.

It adopted the "complaint" form of the Mirror, a "tragic monologue" related by a ghost. There 12 poems based on figures largely legendary: Guidericus (i.e. Guiderius), Carassus (i.e. Carausius), Queen Hellina (i.e. Helena, mother of Constantine I), Vortiger (i.e. Vortigern), Uter Pendragon (i.e. Uther Pendragon), Cadwallader (i.e. Cadwaladr), Sigebert (i.e. Sigeberht of East Anglia), Lady Ebbe (i.e. Æbbe the Younger), Alurede (i.e. Alfred the Great), Egelrede (i.e. Ethelred II), Edricus (? Eadric Streona), and King Harolde (i.e. Harold Godwinson). Sidney Lee in the Dictionary of National Biography wrote that Blennerhasset had handled them "very feebly and prosaically". They are in blank verse. The metre used is the iambic hexameter, and Blenerhasset is credited with the first explicit recognition of the classical iambus as a foot of verse in English.

Harriet Archer draws attention to Blenerhasset's use of the rhetorical figure of paralipsis. She argues that with it, he constructs "a scaffolding of Protestant intellectual culture and reformist thought". Further, she identifies that set of ideas with the circle of Robert Sidney, 1st Earl of Leicester, suggesting that Blenerhasset aspired to membership of that group, as well as of the poets who followed Baldwin by looking for more than face value in the Mirror works. She states that the lack of clear historical foundations for the "Ancient British" material was a commonplace of the time.

In 1610 ten of these poems of Blenerhasset were included in a complete reprint of the various parts of the Mirror for Magistrates undertaken by Richard Niccols; and all of them were reprinted by Joseph Haslewood in his 1815 edition of the Mirror published in 1815.

=== Other works ===
Blenerhasset's literary work also included:

- A translation of Ovid's Remedia Amoris, from his time at Cambridge, not printed.
- A poem A Revelation of the true Minerva, a panegyric on Queen Elizabeth I printed in London in 1582.
- A pamphlet dedicated to Henry Frederick, Prince of Wales, A Direction for the Plantation in Ulster (1610). In it he argued for the extirpation of the Irish in Ulster, as the best means for the "securing of that wilde countrye to the crowne of England." The work is regarded as typical of the "plantation literature" of the period. Ulster, described as "our new worlde", will be settled by "the successors of high renowned Lud" and a new Troy will be built.

== Family ==
His father's will proves Blenerhasset to have been married before 1598, and to have had several children. His eldest brother, Sir Edward Blenerhasset, who shared with him several grants of Irish land, died in 1618.
