= Fulgenius =

Legendary king of the Britons

Fulgenius was a legendary king of the Britons, mentioned in Geoffrey of Monmouth's pseudohistorical Historia Regum Britanniae. He came to power in 245BC.

He was the first of the three sons of Cherin to succeed his father, and was followed by his brothers, first Edadus then Andragius.

Legendary titles
Preceded by Cherin	King of Britain	Succeeded by Edadus
