= Bladud =

Legendary king of the Britons, for whose existence there is no historical evidence

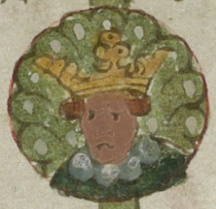
- Bladud from the Genealogical Chronicle of the Kings of England to Edward IV (c. 1461)

King of Britain
- Predecessor: Rud Hud Hudibras
- Successor: Leir
- Issue: Leir
- Father: Rud Hud Hudibras

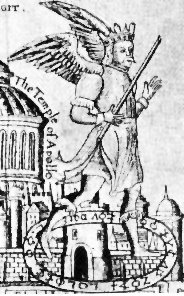
An image of Bladud attempting to fly with his artificial wings (from the Lyte Pedigree of 1605. British Library Catalog entry Add. Ms. 48343).

Bladud or Blaiddyd^{[a]} is a legendary king of the Britons, although there is no historical evidence for his existence. He is first mentioned in Geoffrey of Monmouth's Historia Regum Britanniae (c. 1136), which describes him as the son of King Rud Hud Hudibras, and the tenth ruler in line from the first king, Brutus, saying Bladud was contemporaneous with the biblical prophet Elijah (9th century BC).

A Bleydiud son of Caratauc is mentioned in the Welsh Harley MS 3859 genealogies (in the British Library), suggesting to some that Geoffrey misinterpreted a scrap of Welsh genealogy (such as the Harleian genealogies itself or a related text). The Welsh form of the name is given as Blaiddyd in manuscripts of the Brut Tysilio (Welsh translations of Geoffrey's Historia). The meaning of the name is "Wolf-lord" (Welsh blaidd "wolf" + iudd "lord"). In the text he is said to have founded the city of Bath. He was succeeded by his son Leir (the Shakespearean King Lear).

The tale of Bladud was later embellished by other authors, such as John Hardyng and John Higgins, writing in the fifteenth and sixteenth centuries.

== Legend ==
According to the final form of the legend, which appeared in John Hardyng's Chronicles of 1457, Bladud's father sent his son to be educated in the liberal arts in Athens. After his father's death he returned with four philosophers, and founded a university at Stamford, Lincolnshire, which flourished until Saint Augustine of Canterbury suppressed it on account of heresies which were taught there.

Supposedly he ruled for twenty years from 863 BC or perhaps 500 BC, in which time he built Kaerbadum or Caervaddon (Bath), creating the hot springs there by the use of magic. He dedicated the city to the goddess Athena and in honour of her, lit undying fires, whose flames turned to balls of stone as they grew low, with new ones springing up in their stead: an embellishment of an account from the third-century writer Solinus of the use of local coal on the altars of her temple.

=== Leprosy ===
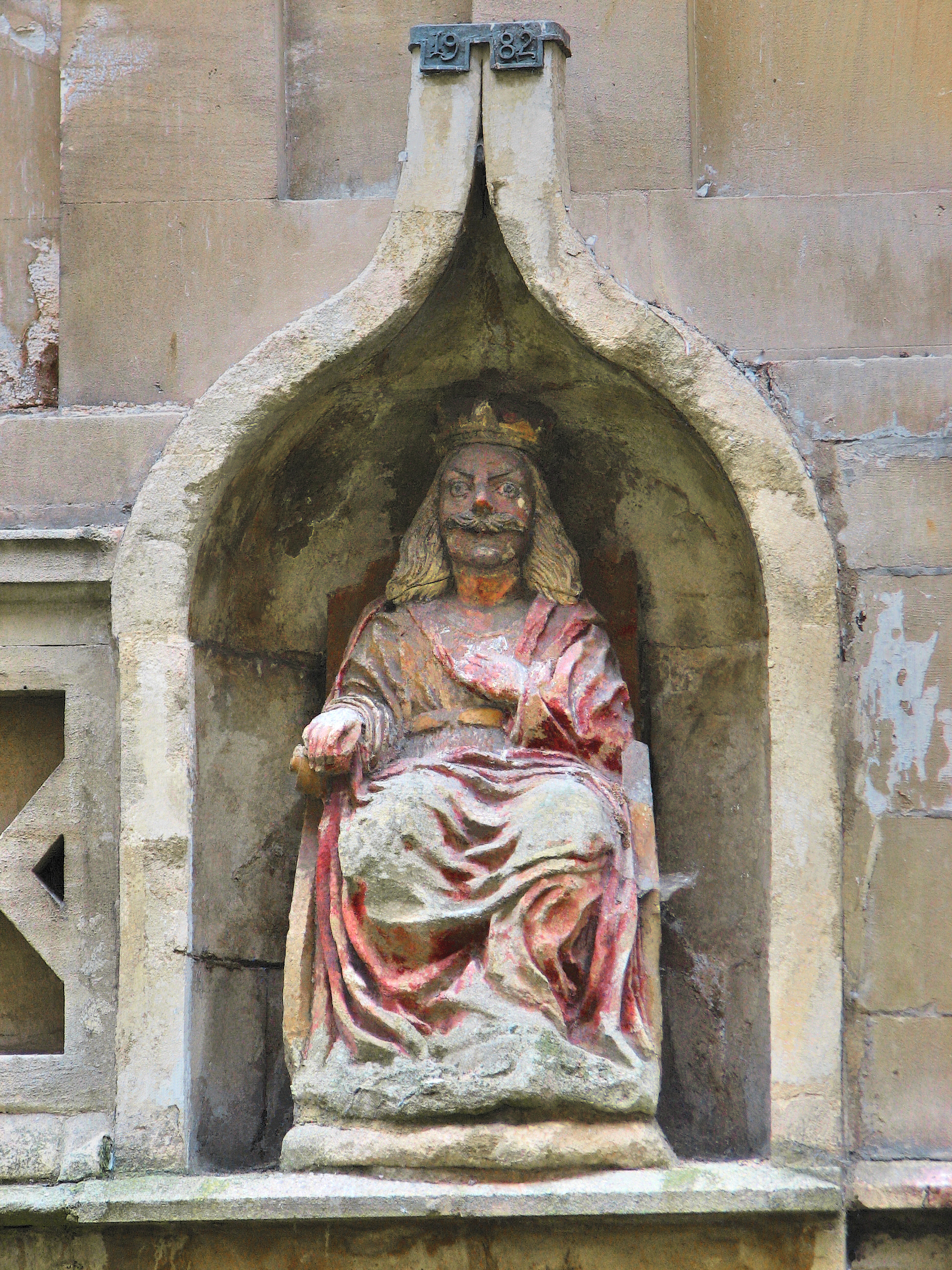
The statue of King Bladud overlooking the King's Bath at Bath

Bladud supposedly founded the city of Bath because, while he was in Athens, he contracted leprosy; when he returned home he was imprisoned as a result, but escaped and went far off to go into hiding. He found employment as a swineherd at Swainswick (the name, as "Swineswick", perhaps deriving from this legend) about two miles from the later site of Bath, and noticed that his pigs would go into an alder-moor in cold weather and return covered in black mud.

He found that this mud was warm, and that the pigs wallowed to enjoy the heat. He also noticed that the pigs which did this did not suffer from skin diseases as others did, and on trying the mud-bath himself found that he was cured of his leprosy. He was then restored to his position as heir-apparent to his father, and founded Bath so that others might also benefit as he had done.

The story of Bladud's cure-by-immersion was much exploited when Bath became a fashionable spa resort. The statue of King Bladud overlooking the King's Bath at Bath carries the date of 1699, but it is much older than this. It was assembled from parts of two statues (respectively depicting Edward III and Bladud himself) previously mounted on the city's north and south gates; its pitted appearance from weathering enhanced the association with disease.

In the eighteenth century Bladud's legendary cure was celebrated by John Wood, the architect responsible for the fashionable development of Bath, who incorporated many references to the king in his buildings.

=== Divination, wings and death ===
The tale claims that Bladud also encouraged the practice of necromancy, or divination through the spirits of the dead. Through this practice, he is said to have constructed wings for himself and to have tried to fly to (or from) the temple of Apollo in Trinovantum (London) or Troja Nova (New Troy), but to have been killed when he hit a wall, or to have fallen and been dashed to pieces or to have broken his neck. He was supposedly buried at New Troy and succeeded by his son, Leir.

== Conflation with Abaris the Hyperborean ==
Eighteenth century Bath architect John Wood wrote about Bladud, and put forth the fanciful suggestion that he should be identified with Abaris the Hyperborean, the healer known from Classical Greek sources.

== Sites Associated with Bladud ==
Besides the Roman Baths, a number of other sites in the region have become associated with the Bladud myth.

=== Sols Rocks ===
John Wood claimed that three large rocks on Lansdown Hill and a 'circular foundation' were the remains of Bladud's sun temple. The rocks and circular feature are now lost, however the site has been identified as being within the grounds of Hope House (formerly known as Rock House) on Lansdown Road. The rocks are unlikely to have occurred there naturally, however their exact purpose remains unknown. Wood's account is the only record of this feature.

=== 'Moon Temple' and related features ===
==== Moon Temple ====
John Wood also claimed that Bladud had a 'Moon Temple' on Lansdown Hill, the primary feature being a circular feature about 30 feet in diameters, with several smaller 'barrows or small semiglobular mounts of earth' and several pits. He associated this site with the Lansdown Fair, which he claimed had been instituted in pagan times. The site has been identified as group of barrows next to the Charlcombe Inn, consisting of one large round barrow and two smaller barrows.

==== Moon Observatory ====
In addition to the 'Moon Temple', John Wood claimed that at a nearby site, Bladud placed his priests to watch for the new moon. The site has been identified as Little Down Camp, just above the village of North Stoke.

==== Labyrinth ====
John Wood claimed that to the north of the Moon Observatory "we find a work that makes a mere labyrinth of holes, ditches, banks, and barrows... whereby King Bladud and his colleagues feigned themselves able to raise up all the deities and inhabitants of the infernal mansions in the practice of the art of necromancy". The site has been identified as The Tumps, an ancient quarry of uncertain date, mentioned in two Saxon Charters, which may have also played a role in the English Civil War battle on Lansdown.

=== Solsbury Hill ===
Solsbury Hill was first linked to Bladud in a pseudonymous manuscript thought to date from c. 1670-2 and later attributed to Robert Gay, vicar of Nettlecombe, who claimed that Bladud had a temple and dwelt in a cave there. John Wood later claimed that Bladud's fatal flight ended on a temple belonging to Solsbury Hill.

== In fiction ==
Vera Chapman's Blaedud the Birdman is a fantasy novel about the character.

Moyra Caldecott's The Winged Man is a fictional account of the life of Bladud.

Bladud, styled Blaiddyd, is a legendary hero in Fire Emblem: Three Houses.

The narrator of Stephen Lawhead's second Song of Albion book (The Silver Hand, 1992 ISBN 9781782640493), Tegid Tathal, Chief Bard of Albion, is asked by the god Gofannon to tell the story of Bladudd the Blemished which he does in the way of myth, presenting it as a classic teaching story about sovereignty and mental/ physical purity.

The legend is reproduced with some artistic interpretation as a short story in Charles Dickens' novel “The Pickwick Papers”, as the main character is visiting Bath.

== See also ==
- List of legendary rulers of Cornwall
- Pseudohistorical
- Nennius
- King of the Britons

== Notes ==
a. Pronunciation: As a mythological figure, there is no definitive pronunciation, but in modern English it is /ˈblædəd/. In the Brythonic language of the time the dd of "Blaiddyd" would have been pronounced [ð], which has allowed some authors to call him "Bathulf, the founder of Bath".

Legendary titles
Preceded by Rud Hud Hudibras	King of Britain	Succeeded by Leir
