= Gurgustius =

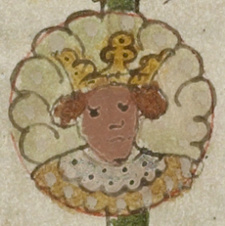
- Gurgustius from the Genealogical Chronicle of the Kings of England to Edward IV (c. 1461)

King of Britain
- Reign: c. 788BCE
- Predecessor: Rivallo
- Successor: Sisillius I
- Issue: Sisillius I; Antonius, Duke of Cornwall
- Father: Rivallo

Gurgustius (Welsh: Gwrwst) was a legendary king of the Britons as accounted by Geoffrey of Monmouth. He came to power in 788BC.

He was the son of King Rivallo and was succeeded by his own son Sisillius I, and then Jago, who was Gurgustius' nephew (or possibly his grandson). Geoffrey has nothing to say of him beyond this.

== Relation to Jago ==
In the Historia Regum Britanniae, Gurgustius is succeeded by his son Sisillius, who in turn is succeeded by Jago. The Latin text describes Jago as "Iago Gurgustii nepos". This is generally interpreted as meaning "Jago, Gurgustius's nephew", but could mean "Jago, Gurgustius's grandson" instead. Examples of the latter interpretation include the Black Book of Basingwerk (where Jago is Sisillius's son) and Michael A. Faletra's 2007 translation, which calls him "Iago, the grandson of Gurgustius".

== Later tradition ==
The Book of Baglan (1600–1607) gives Gurgustius' name as Gorwst, and states that he had a second son, Antonius, who was Duke of Cornwall.

Legendary titles
Preceded by Rivallo	King of Britain	Succeeded by Sisillius I
