= Gorbonianus =

King of Britain
- Reign: c. 349 BCE
- Predecessor: Morvidus
- Successor: Archgallo
- Issue: son of Gorbonianus
- Father: Morvidus

Gorbonianus (Welsh: Gorviniaw map Morydd) was a legendary king of the Britons as recounted by Geoffrey of Monmouth. He came to power in 349 BC. He was the eldest son of King Morvidus, and the brother of Archgallo, Elidurus, Ingenius, and Peredurus.

According to Geoffrey, Gorbonianus was unlike many kings in that he loved equity and ruled frugally. He often would pay his respects to the gods and ruled his people with common justice and laws. Many temples were built or restored in his reign and the kingdom grew increasingly more wealthy. Protection was given to the country farmers from their masters. He gave wealth to his soldiers as to stop unnecessary violence against the peasantry or neighbours.

He reigned for some time then died and was buried in Trinovantum. He was succeeded by his brother, Archgallo, who was deposed for his wickedness, and the kingship passed back and forth among the sons of Morvidus for several years. After the death of the final brother, Elidurus, the kingship passed to an unnamed son of Gorbonianus, who Layamon calls Lador.

Legendary titles
Preceded by Morvidus	King of Britain	Succeeded by Archgallo
