= Son of Gorbonianus =

Legendary King of the Britons

The son of Gorbonianus was a legendary king of the Britons as recounted by Geoffrey of Monmouth. He was a son of King Gorbonianus but was never given a name in the text. He came to power in 305BC.

According to Geoffrey, he was a good and prudent king who emulated his uncle and predecessor, Elidurus. He was just and compassionate to his people and never faltered in his righteousness to them. When he died, he was succeeded by his cousin, Marganus, the son of Archgallo.

In Layamon's Brut by Layamon he is named as Lador, but rules for a short time.

Legendary titles
Preceded by Elidurus	King of Britain	Succeeded by Marganus II
