= Eldol =

Legendary king of Britain

Eldol (Welsh: Eidol mab Arthmael) is a legendary king of Britain in Geoffrey of Monmouth's c. 1136 work Historia Regum Britanniae ("The History of the Kings of Britain"). He came to power in 155 BC. He was succeeded by Redion.

A 6th century hero called Eidol is mentioned in The Gododdin but is unlikely to be the source for Geoffrey's Eldol. He should also not be confused with Eldol, Consul of Gloucester, who lives generations later in Geoffrey's work.

Legendary titles
Preceded by Archmail	King of Britain	Succeeded by Redon
