= CAFF =

CAFF may refer to:

- Cambridge African Film Festival
- Canadian Association of Fringe Festivals
- Chinese American Film Festival
- Cyprus Amateur Football Federation

== See also ==
- Caff (disambiguation)
