= Kinarius =

Legendary King

King of Britain
- Reign: c. 367BCE
- Predecessor: Sisillius II
- Successor: Danius
- Father: Sisillius II

Kinarius was a fictitious legendary king of the Britons as recounted by Geoffrey of Monmouth. He came to power in 367BC. He was son of Sisillius II and succeeded by his brother, Danius.

Legendary titles
Preceded by Sisillius II	King of Britain	Succeeded by Danius
