= Capoir =

Legendary king of the Britons

Capoir was a legendary king of the Britons as accounted by Geoffrey of Monmouth. He came to power in 119BC.

He was preceded by Pir and succeeded by his son Digueillus.

== Castleford's Chronicle ==
Capoir is also mentioned in the Middle English verse chronicle Castleford's Chronicle, where his name appears in the form "Capaire". Castleford's Chronicle belongs to the tradition of Brut chronicles, and much of its early legendary-history material draws on Geoffrey of Monmouth's Historia Regum Britanniae; the Capoir passage is therefore a Middle English verse witness to the Galfridian tradition rather than an independent historical account.

The poem names Capaire as the son and successor of King Pir, describes him as a strong and fair knight, and says that he was succeeded by his son Eliguele, corresponding to Geoffrey's Digueillus:

And aftre Kyng Pir his son, Capaire,
Strenghfull knight he was and faire.
And aftre Capaire, þe soþ to spele,
Com Capairs son, King Eliguele.

A literal modern English rendering is:

And after King Pir came his son, Capoir;
he was a strong and fair knight.
And after Capoir, to tell the truth,
came Capoir's son, King Eliguele.

Legendary titles
Preceded by Pir	King of Britain	Succeeded by Digueillus
