= Beldgabred =

Legendary king of the Britons

Beldgabred (Welsh: Blegywyrd) was a legendary king of the Britons as accounted by Geoffrey of Monmouth. He reigned approximately 167–161 BC.

He was preceded by Sisillius III and succeeded by his brother Archmail. Geoffrey says that Beldgabred surpassed all other musicians on every kind of instrument and was claimed to be the god of minstrels.

Legendary titles
Preceded by Sisillius III	King of Britain	Succeeded by Archmail
