= Gorboduc =

Legendary king of the Britons

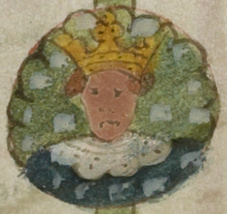
- Gorboduc from the Genealogical Chronicle of the Kings of England to Edward IV (c. 1461)

King of Britain
- Predecessor: Kimarcus
- Successor: Porrex I
- Spouse: Judon
- Issue: Porrex I; Ferrex
- Father: Kimarcus

Gorboduc (Welsh: Gorwy or Goronwy) was a legendary king of the Britons as recounted by Geoffrey of Monmouth. He was married to Judon. When he became old, his sons, Ferrex and Porrex, feuded over who would take over the kingdom. Porrex tried to kill his brother in an ambush, but Ferrex escaped to France. With the French king Suhardus, he invaded Britain, but was defeated and killed by Porrex. Porrex was killed in revenge by his own mother Judon, leading to a long period of anarchy. Geoffrey does not state when Gorbuduc died, but he is not mentioned after the account of the strife between his sons.

== Cultural references ==
Gorboduc's life is the subject of the 1561 play Gorboduc, which is historically important for being the model for later Elizabethan drama, for example, Shakespeare's The Tragedie of King Lear and The Lamentable Tragedy of Titus Andronicus. It is the first play written throughout in blank verse. The story, like that of his ancestor King Lear, was used by Elizabethans as a warning of the dangers of civil discord.

"A niece of King Gorboduc" is mentioned briefly by the Fool in Shakespeare's Twelfth Night.

J. R. R. Tolkien named a fictional character Gorbadoc Brandybuck, using a slight alteration of Gorboduc's name from the Historia Regum Britanniae. The character is the grandfather of Frodo Baggins, and great-grandfather of Meriadoc Brandybuck. Early manuscript versions of the first chapter of The Hobbit call him Gorboduc Brandybuck, and also have a friend of Bilbo Baggins named Gorboduc Grubb. Tolkien's first versions of the Brandybuck and Took family trees also initially spelled the name Gorboduc Brandybuck before being changed to Gormanac and then Gorbadoc. The first part of the name of another character, Gorbulas Brandybuck, may also be derived from Gorboduc.

"Gorboduc" is the name of a poem by John Ashbery that appears in the collection April Galleons (1987).

Legendary titles
| Preceded by Kimarcus | King of Britain | Succeeded by Porrex I |
