= Rivallo =

King of Britain
- Reign: c. 817BCE
- Predecessor: Cunedagius
- Successor: Gurgustius
- Issue: Gurgustius; unknown son
- Father: Cunedagius

Rivallo (Welsh: Rhiwallon) was a legendary king of the Britons as accounted by Geoffrey of Monmouth. He came to power in 817BC.

He was the son of King Cunedagius and was noted as a young king who reigned with moderation. Geoffrey describes him as a "peaceful and fortunate youth, who ruled the kingdom well".

His reign was troubled by natural disasters: a rain of blood that lasted three days, a devastating plague, and a great swarm of flies. He was succeeded by his son Gurgustius.

Legendary titles
Preceded by Cunedagius	King of Britain	Succeeded by Gurgustius
