= Redon of Britain =

Legendary king of the Britons

Redon was a legendary king of the Britons as accounted by Geoffrey of Monmouth. He came to power in 149BC.

He was preceded by Eldol and succeeded by Redechius.

Legendary titles
Preceded by Eldol	King of Britain	Succeeded by Redechius
