= Jago of Britain =

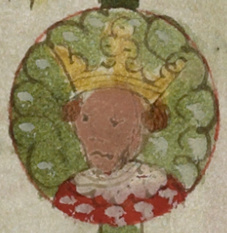
- Jago from the Genealogical Chronicle of the Kings of England to Edward IV (c. 1461)

King of Britain
- Predecessor: Sisillius I
- Successor: Kimarcus

Jago (Welsh: Iago; sometimes Jaygo; James in English) was a legendary king of the Britons in Geoffrey of Monmouth's Historia Regum Britanniae. The Latin text describes him as the nepos ('nephew' or 'grandson') of Gurgustius, and while the majority of translators and scholars interpret this as meaning Gurgustius' nephew, some call him his grandson instead. He succeeded Gurgustius' son Sisillius I to the throne and was succeeded by Sissillius' son Kimarcus. Geoffrey has nothing more to say of him.

== Nepos ==
The Latin text of the Historia Regum Britanniae describes him as: "Iago Gurgustii nepos" ('Iago, nepos of Gurgustius'). The word nepos can mean "nephew" or "grandson". In this case it is generally interpreted to mean "nephew", but the Black Book of Basingwerk defines him as the son of Sisillius I, and so grandson of Gurgustius, and Michael A. Faletra's 2007 translation calls him "Iago, the grandson of Gurgustius".

Legendary titles
Preceded by Sisillius I	King of Britain	Succeeded by Kimarcus
