= Gurgintius =

Legendary king of the Britons

Gurgintius (Welsh: Gorwst) was a legendary king of the Britons as accounted by Geoffrey of Monmouth. He came to power in 203 BC.

He was preceded by Clotenus and succeeded by Merianus.

Legendary titles
Preceded by Clotenus	King of Britain	Succeeded by Merianus
