= Gurguit Barbtruc =

King of Britain
- Predecessor: Belinus
- Successor: Guithelin
- Issue: Guithelin
- Father: Belinus

Gurguit Barbtruc (Welsh: Gwrgant Farfdrwch) was a legendary king of the Britons as accounted by Geoffrey of Monmouth. He was the son of Belinus and was said to have found a home for the Irish people.

Gurguit was a peaceful king who followed in the manner of his father and grandfather. Yet, when the king of the Danes refused to pay tribute to Belinus's son, Gurguit took a fleet and invaded Denmark, killing the king and reducing the country to subservience.

On the return voyage, Gurguit came across a fleet of thirty ships of men and women, called Basclenses, under the leadership of Partholoim. They had been exiled from Spain and sought a new land to live in. Gurguit did not allow them to settle in Britain but he gave them the isle of Ireland to settle, which was (according to this fanciful legend) uninhabited until then, and thus the Basclenses became the Irish.

Gurguit died peacefully and was buried in the Caerleon, a city he built up from the time his father founded it. Guithelin succeeded him to the kingship.

Legendary titles
Preceded by Belinus	King of Britain	Succeeded by Guithelin
