= Pir of the Britons =

Legendary king of the Britons

Pir was a legendary king of the Britons according to Geoffrey of Monmouth's History of the Kings of Britain. He came to power in 125 BC.

He was preceded by Samuil Penissel, and succeeded by Capoir.

Legendary titles
Preceded by Samuil Penissel	King of Britain	Succeeded by Capoir
