= Rud Hud Hudibras =

King of Britain
- Predecessor: Leil
- Successor: Bladud
- Issue: Bladud
- Father: Leil

Rud Hud Hudibras (Welsh: Run baladr bras) was a legendary king of the Britons as recounted by Geoffrey of Monmouth. He came to power in 974BC.

He was the son of King Leil and ruled during a civil war.

== Story ==
During the waning years of Leil's reign, the kingdom of the Britons became unstable, and civil war broke out. Rud Hud Hudibras became king after his father's death and reigned for 39 years, ending the civil war and restoring peace to the kingdom. During his reign, he founded Kaerreint, later renamed Canterbury by the Angles. He is also said to have founded Kaerguenit (Winchester) and Paladur Castle (Shaftesbury). He was succeeded by his son Bladud.

Geoffrey places Rud Hud Hudibras' reign during the time Capys was king in Alba Longa and Haggai, Amos, Joel, and Azariah were prophesying in Israel. Haggai began his ministry around 520 BC, whilst Amos is said to have prophesied during the reigns of Uzziah of Judah and Jeroboam II, probably around 760 BC.

== In literature and fiction ==
A reference to Rud Hud Hudibras is featured in the title and character of Samuel Butler's mock-heroic poem Hudibras (1663–1678).

Rud Hud Hudibras is a primary character in American author Zachary J. Cooper's series of short stories set in Ancient Wales.

Legendary titles
Preceded by Leil	King of Britain	Succeeded by Bladud
