= Archmail =

Legendary king of the Britons

Archmail (Welsh: Arthmael) was a legendary king of the Britons as accounted by Geoffrey of Monmouth. He came to power in 161 BC.

He was preceded by Beldgabred, his brother, and succeeded by Eldol.

Legendary titles
Preceded by Beldgabred	King of Britain	Succeeded by Eldol
