= Gorboduc (play) =

1561 English play

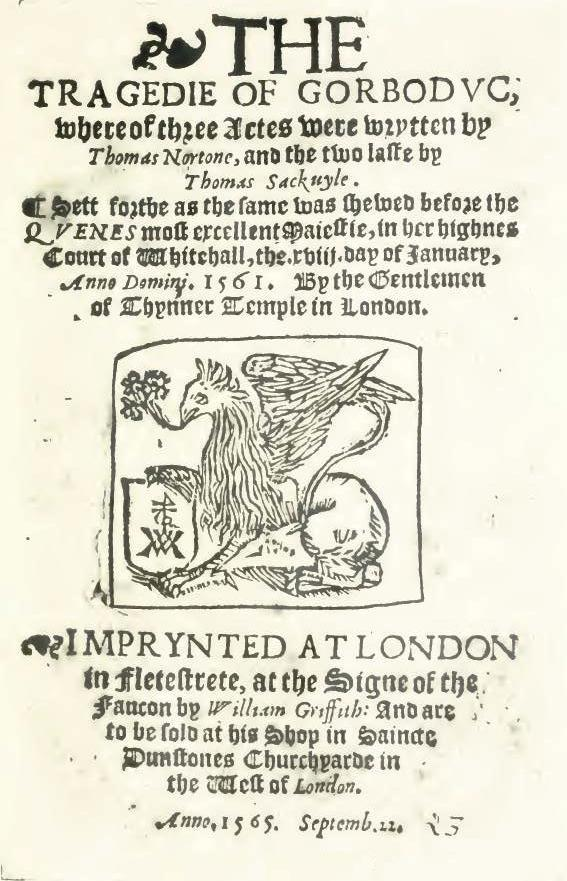
Title page of The Tragedie of Gorboduc (1565)

The Tragedie of Gorboduc, also titled Ferrex and Porrex, is an English play from 1561. It was first performed at the Christmas celebration given by the Inner Temple in 1561, and performed at Whitehall before Queen Elizabeth I on 18 January 1561, by the Gentlemen of the Inner Temple. The authors were Thomas Norton and Thomas Sackville, said to be responsible for the first three acts, and the final two, respectively.

The first quarto, published by the bookseller William Griffith, was published 22 September 1565. A second authorized quarto corrected by the authors followed in 1570, and was printed by John Day with the title The Tragedie of Ferrex and Porrex. A third edition was published in 1590 by Edward Allde.

The play is notable for several reasons: as the first verse drama in English to employ blank verse; for its political subject matter (the realm of Gorboduc is disputed by his sons Ferrex and Porrex), which was still a touchy area in the early years of Elizabeth's reign, while the succession to the throne was unclear; for its manner, progressing from the models of the morality play and Senecan tragedy in the direction which would be followed by later playwrights. That is, it can be seen as a forerunner of the whole trend that would later produce Titus Andronicus and King Lear. It also provides the first well-documented performance of a play in Ireland: Charles Blount, 8th Baron Mountjoy staged it at Dublin Castle in 1601.

== Synopsis ==
The playtext summarizes the plot in the 'Argument': "Gorboduc, King of Britain, divided his realm in his lifetime to his sons, Ferrex and Porrex. The sons fell to dissension. The younger killed the elder. The mother that more dearly loved the elder, for revenge killed the younger. The people, moved with the cruelty of the fact, rose in rebellion and slew both father and mother. The nobility assembled and most terribly destroyed the rebels. And afterward, for want of issue of the prince, whereby the succession of the crown became uncertain, they fell to civil war in which both they and many of their issues were slain, and the land for a long time almost desolate and miserably wasted."

Gorboduc announces his plan to divide his kingdom between his sons Ferrex and Porrex. His councillors advise against it, reminding him of the conflict that arose between the cousins Morgan and Cunedag when Britain was divided between them, which led to Morgan's death. Gorboduc appreciates their advice but goes ahead with his plan. Ferrex is advised by the parasite Hermon to take the whole Kingdom. Tyndar tells Porrex that his brother is making plans for war, meaning Porrex decides to invade Ferrex's realm. Dordan writes to Gorboduc of this. Gorboduc bewails this and is advised to raise a force against them. However, a nuntius (messenger) then enters, bearing the news of Ferrex's death. Porrex meets his father and justifies his actions, saying that he was content to rule his kingdom but that his brother plotted to take his lands. However, his mother Videna then stabs him dead while he is sleeping in revenge for Ferrex. The people rise up in anger and kill both her and Gorboduc, blaming the King for Porrex's death. The nobles prepare to act against the rebels. However, the succession is left uncertain. Fergus, Duke of Albany, plans to gain the throne and begins raising an army while his friends try to gather support. The nobles defeat the rebels, but hear that Fergus has raised an army and intends to take the crown. The nobles oppose Fergus, thinking of him as a foreign invader. Arostus says that Parliament must decide upon a new King. Eubulus bemoans the chaos that has happened to the country and says that Parliament should have been called while the King was alive, but that justice will eventually prevail.

== Characters ==
- Gorboduc, King of Great Britain
- Videna, Queen and wife to King Gorboduc
- Ferrex, Elder Son to King Gorboduc
- Porrex, Younger Son to King Gorboduc
- Clotyn, Duke of Cornewall
- Fergus, Duke of Albany
- Mandud, Duke of Leagre
- Gwenard, Duke of Cumberland
- Eubulus, Secretary to the king Gorboduc
- Arostus, A Counsellour of king Gorboduc
- Dordan, A Counsellour assigned by the king to his Eldest Son Ferrex
- Philander, A Counsellour assigned by the king to his younger Son Porrex
- Hermon, A Parasite of Ferrex and Fergus's slave
- Tyndar, A Parasite of Porrex
- Nuntius, A Messenger of Ferrex's death
- Nuntius, A Messenger of Duke Fergus rising
- Marcella, A Lady of the Queen's privy Chamber
- Chorus, Four ancient and sage men of Britain
