= Bledudo =

Legendary king of the Britons

Bledudo (Welsh: Blaiddyd) was a legendary king of the Britons as accounted by Geoffrey of Monmouth and the second to bear this name. He came to power in 191 BC.

He was preceded by Merianus and succeeded by Cap.

Legendary titles
Preceded by Merianus	King of Britain	Succeeded by Cap
