= Marganus II =

Legendary king of Britain

Marganus II (Welsh: Morgan mab Arthal) was a legendary king of the Britons as recounted by Geoffrey of Monmouth. He came to power in 299BC.

He was the son of King Archgallo and was succeeded by his brother, Enniaunus. He ruled the kingdom in tranquility and without conflict.

Legendary titles
Preceded by A son of Gorbonianus	King of Britain	Succeeded by Enniaunus
