= Catellus =

Legendary king of the Britons

Catellus (Welsh: Kadell map Geraint) was a legendary king of the Britons, as recounted in Geoffrey of Monmouth's work Historia Regum Britanniae. He came to power in 269 BC.

According to Geoffrey, he was the son of King Gerennus and was succeeded by his son, Millus. In some versions of the Brut y Brenhinedd, a series of Welsh versions of Geoffrey's Historia, Catellus is succeeded by his son Coel, who is then succeeded by his own son Porrex II.

Legendary titles
Preceded by Gerennus	King of Britain	Succeeded by Millus
