= Merianus =

Legendary king of the Britons

Merianus (Welsh: Mairiawn) was a legendary king of the Britons as accounted by Geoffrey of Monmouth. He came to power in 197 BC.

He was preceded by Gurgintius and succeeded by Bledudo.

Legendary titles
Preceded by Gurgintius	King of Britain	Succeeded by Bledudo
