= Gutun Owain =

15th-century Welsh poet

Gutun Owain (fl. 1456–1497) was a poet in the Welsh language. He was born near Oswestry in what is now north Shropshire and was a student of Dafydd ab Edmwnd.

Gutun Owain was closely associated with the Cistercian abbey of Valle Crucis where he was the principal scribe of the S text of Brenhinoedd y Saeson preserved in the Black Book of Basingwerk, and where he may have been responsible for the continuation of that chronicle from 1333 to its end in 1461.
