= King Runo =

Legendary British king

Runo (Welsh: Rhun map Peredyr) was a legendary powerful king of the Britons as recounted by Geoffrey of Monmouth. He came to power in 281BC.

He was the son of King Peredurus and was succeeded by his cousin Gerennus.

Legendary titles
Preceded by Idvallo	King of Britain	Succeeded by Gerennus
