= Redechius =

Legendary king of the Britons

Rederchius was a legendary king of the Britons according to Geoffrey of Monmouth's History of the Kings of Britain (1136). He was also known as Rhydderch and came to power in 143BC.

He was preceded by Redon and succeeded by Samuil Penissel.

Legendary titles
Preceded by Redon	King of Britain	Succeeded by Samuil Penissel
