= Millus =

Legendary king of the Britons

Millus was a legendary king of the Britons as recounted by Geoffrey of Monmouth. His father was King Catellus and he was succeeded by his son, Porrex II.

Legendary titles
Preceded by Catellus	King of Britain	Succeeded by Porrex II
