= Saint Asaph =

Welsh bishop and saint

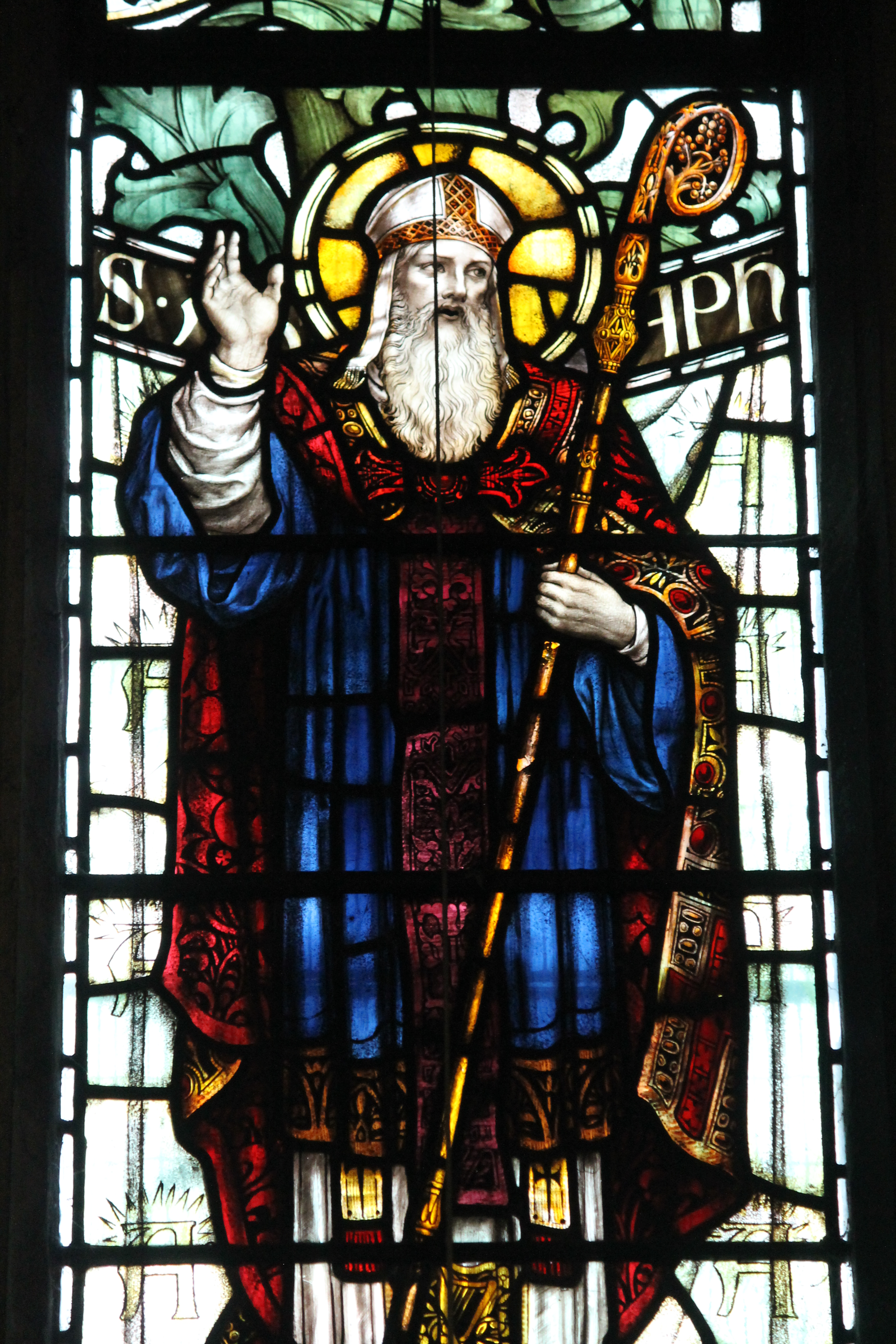
- Stained glass window of Saint Asaph, St Giles' Church, Wrexham

Bishop
- Born: early 6th century what is now Northern Wales, UK
- Died: 1 May 596; St Asaph, Flintshire (historically), Denbighshire (modern)
- Venerated in: Eastern Orthodox Church; Roman Catholic Church; Anglican Communion
- Major shrine: St Asaph Cathedral, Flintshire (destroyed)
- Feast: 1 May, 5 May, 11 May
- Attributes: Bishop with a book, or monk carrying hot coals
- Patronage: St Asaph

Saint Asaph (or Asaf, Asa; died 1 May 596) was a Welsh bishop and saint, traditionally regarded as the first Bishop of St Asaph of the diocese of Saint Asaph. He is venerated as a saint in the Catholic Church and the Eastern Orthodox Church.

== Biography ==
No traditional Welsh account devoted to the life of Asaph exists. He is, though, well-attested to through place names. Local tradition points out many landmarks attested to him; his ash tree, his church, his well and his Valley. Many local names bear the "asa" associated with his name; Onnen Asa, Ffynnon Asa, Llanasa, Pantasa. All these sites are near Holywell in Tegeingl (Flintshire), indicating probably that the saint may once have had a hermitage in that area. The Bonedd y Saint tells us that he was a son of King Sawyl Penuchel from the Old North or Yr Hen Ogledd; his mother was said to be Gwenaseth, daughter of Rhufon Rhufoniog.

The want of a Welsh Life, however, is in part compensated for by Jocelyn of Furness's Life of St. Kentigern, which tells the story of Cyndeyrn (Kentigern) alias Saint Mungo, the founder of the Diocese of Glasgow. During his exile (c. 545), Kentigern took himself to Wales and there founded the Celtic Monastery of Llanelwy (the church on the River Elwy), as the Welsh still call the city of St Asaph. Llanelwy is among the best documented of Celtic monasteries: the church was described as built "of smoothed wood, after the fashion of the Britons, seeing that they could not yet build of stone". The 965 disciples, of whom Asaph was one, were divided into three groups: 300 of the unlettered farmed the outlying lands, 300 worked in the offices around the monastery, and 365 (the number corresponds to the days of the year) attended to the divine services. Of these the oldest assisted Kentigern in the government of the diocese, and the rest were subdivided into three choirs. "As soon as one choir had terminated its service in church, immediately another entering commenced it: and that again being concluded another entered to celebrate."

Kentigern would frequently pray standing in the icy cold river. On one occasion, having suffered very severely under this hardship, he sent the boy, Asaph, who was then attending him, to bring a brand of blazing wood to burn and warm him. Asaph instead brought him live coals in his apron, and the miracle revealed to Kentigern the sanctity of his disciple. So when the old man was recalled to Strathclyde, after the Battle of Arfderydd, in 573 Asaph was consecrated bishop to succeed him, and became the first Welsh bishop of the see.

Asaph is said to have died in 596.

== Veneration ==
In the 2004 edition of the Roman Martyrology, Asaph is listed under 1 May with the Latin name Asáphi. He is described simply as 'bishop and abbot of Elvae (Elwy) in Wales, after whom the see is named'. Although the traditional date of his death is recognised as 1 May, the current Roman Catholic liturgical calendar for Wales keeps his memorial on 5 May, the 1st being designated for Saint Joseph the Worker.

The Concise Oxford Dictionary of the Christian Church indicates that St Asaph's feast, though now celebrated on 5 May, was previously celebrated on 11 May.

Asaph is also recognized as founder of the church of Llanasa in Flintshire.

There are streets in Brockley, South East London; Christchurch, New Zealand; Bala Cynwyd, Pennsylvania; and in Alexandria, Virginia, and Leominster, Massachusetts named in his honor.

A hymn tune used with the Scottish paraphrase 'How bright these glorious spirits shine' is called St Asaph. It was first published in 1825 in a collection by the Edinburgh musician Robert Archibald Smith, and attributed by him to Giovanni Marie Giornovichi 1745–1804.

== Sources ==
- Attwater, Donald; John, Catherine Rachel (1993). The Penguin Dictionary of Saints (3rd ed.). New York: Penguin Books. ISBN 0-14-051312-4.
- Thomas, Daniel Lleufer (1901). "Asaph" . In Lee, Sidney (ed.). Dictionary of National Biography (1st supplement). London: Smith, Elder & Co.
