= Idvallo =

Briton legendary king

Idvallo (Welsh: Eidwal mab Owain) was a legendary king of the Britons as recounted by Geoffrey of Monmouth. He came to power in 287BC.

He was the son of King Ingenius and he replaced King Enniaunus. Idvallo is said by Geoffrey to have reigned righteously to mend the ills his cousin had brought. He was succeeded by his cousin, Runo.

Legendary titles
Preceded by Enniaunus	King of Britain	Succeeded by Runo
