= Oenus =

Legendary king of the Britons

Oenus was a legendary king of the Britons as accounted by Geoffrey of Monmouth. He reigned approximately 179–173 BC.

He was preceded by Cap and succeeded by Sisillius III.

Legendary titles
| Preceded by Cap | King of Britain | Succeeded by Sisillius III |
