= Danius =

King of Britain
- Reign: c. 361BCE
- Predecessor: Kinarius
- Successor: Morvidus
- Issue: Morvidus (Illegitimate)
- Father: Sisillius II

Danius (Welsh: Daned map Saessyllt) was a legendary king of the Britons as recounted by Geoffrey of Monmouth. He came to power in 361BC.

He was son of Sisillius II, brother of Kinarius and was succeeded by his illegitimate son Morvidus.

Legendary titles
Preceded by Kinarius	King of Britain	Succeeded by Morvidus
