= Cledaucus =

Legendary king of the Britons

Cledaucus (Welsh: Clydog) was a legendary king of the Britons as accounted by Geoffrey of Monmouth. He came to power in 215 BC.

He was preceded by Eliud and succeeded by Clotenus.

Legendary titles
Preceded by Eliud	King of Britain	Succeeded by Clotenus
