= Clotenus =

Legendary king of the Britons

Clotenus was a legendary king of the Britons as accounted by Geoffrey of Monmouth. He came to power in 209 BC.

He was preceded by Cledaucus and succeeded by Gurgintius.

Legendary titles
Preceded by Cledaucus	King of Britain	Succeeded by Gurgintius
