= Leil =

Pseudo-historical king of the Britons

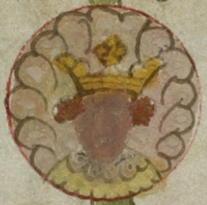
- Leil from the Genealogical Chronicle of the Kings of England to Edward IV (c. 1461)

King of Britain
- Predecessor: Brutus Greenshield
- Successor: Rud Hud Hudibras
- Issue: Rud Hud Hudibras
- Father: Brutus Greenshield

Leil was a legendary king of the Britons as accounted by Geoffrey of Monmouth. He was the son of King Brutus Greenshield and came to power in 989BC.

Leil was a peaceful and just king and took advantage of the prosperity afforded him by his ancestors. He founded Carlisle, Cumbria (Caerleil: Fort of Leil) in the north as a tribute to this prosperity. He reigned for twenty-five years until he grew old and feeble. His inactivity sparked a civil war, during which he died. He was succeeded by his son Rud Hud Hudibras.

Geoffrey asserts that Leil reigned at the time when Solomon built the Temple in Jerusalem and Silvus Epitus was king of Alba Longa.

Legendary titles
Preceded by Brutus Greenshield	King of Britain	Succeeded by Rud Hud Hudibras
