= Porrex II =

Legendary king of the Britons

Porrex II was a legendary king of the Britons as recounted in Geoffrey of Monmouth's Historia Regum Britanniae. He came to power in 257 BC.

He was the son of Coel and the grandson of Catellus; he was succeeded by his son, Cherin.

In some versions of the story, his father was King Millus.

Legendary titles
Preceded by Millus	King of Britain	Succeeded by Cherin
