= List of legendary kings of Britain =

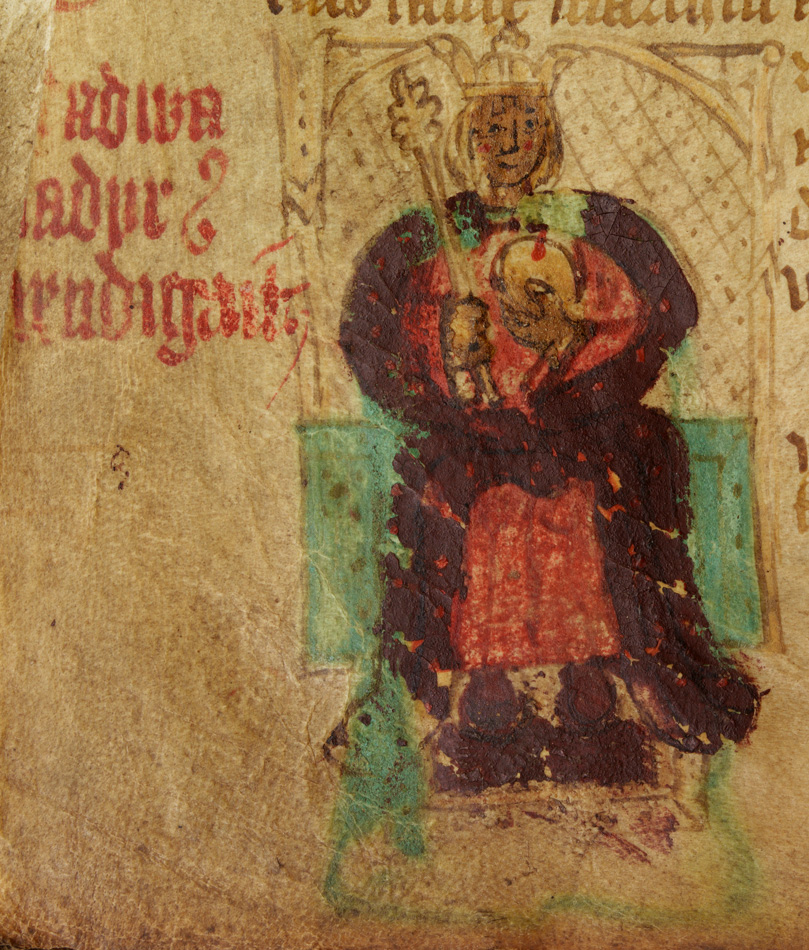
Illustration of Cadwaladr Fendigaid from Geoffrey of Monmouth's Historia Regum Britanniae. Cadwaladr was also a historical king.

The following list of legendary kings of Britain (Welsh: brenin y Brythoniaid or brenin Prydain) derives predominantly from Geoffrey of Monmouth's circa 1136 work Historia Regum Britanniae ("the History of the Kings of Britain"). Geoffrey constructed a largely fictional history for the Britons (ancestors of the Welsh, the Cornish and the Bretons), partly based on the work of earlier medieval historians like Gildas, Nennius and Bede, partly from Welsh genealogies and saints' lives, partly from sources now lost and unidentifiable, and partly from his own imagination (see bibliography). Several of his kings are based on genuine historical figures, but appear in unhistorical narratives. A number of Middle Welsh versions of Geoffrey's Historia exist. All post-date Geoffrey's text, but may give us some insight into any native traditions Geoffrey may have drawn on.

Geoffrey's narrative begins with the exiled Trojan prince Brutus, after whom Britain is supposedly named, a tradition previously recorded in less elaborate form in the 9th century Historia Brittonum. Brutus is a descendant of Aeneas, the legendary Trojan ancestor of the founders of Rome, and his story is evidently related to Roman foundation legends.

The kings before Brutus come from a document purporting to trace the travels of Noah and his offspring in Europe, and once attributed to the Chaldean historian Berossus, but now considered to have been a fabrication by the 15th-century Italian monk Annio da Viterbo, who first published it. Renaissance historians like John Bale and Raphael Holinshed took the list of kings of "Celtica" given by pseudo-Berossus and made them into kings of Britain as well as Gaul. John Milton records these traditions in his History of Britain, although he gives them little credence.

== Brutus of Britain (Brutus of Troy) ==
Historia Brittonum, which is a history of the Celtic Britons written in north Wales in 829–30, claims that the Celtic Britons were descended from Trojans from the ancient city of Troy, who were the first to settle on the island of Britain. It is also claimed in Historia Brittonum, as well as Historia Regum Britanniae by Geoffrey of Monmouth, that the first king of the Britons was Brutus of Troy and that the island of Britain was named after him.

== Lucius of Britain ==
Lucius was a legendary 2nd-century king of the Britons traditionally credited with introducing Christianity into Britain. Lucius is first mentioned in a 6th-century version of the Liber Pontificalis, which says that he sent a letter to Pope Eleutherius asking to be made a Christian. The story became widespread after it was repeated in the 8th century by Bede in his Ecclesiastical History of the English People, who added the detail that after Eleutherius granted Lucius' request, the Britons followed their king in conversion and maintained the Christian faith until the Diocletianic Persecution of 303. Later writers expanded the legend, giving accounts of missionary activity under Lucius and attributing to him the foundation of certain churches.

There is no contemporary evidence for a king of this name. In 1904 Adolf von Harnack proposed that there had been a scribal error in Liber Pontificalis with 'Britanio' being written as an erroneous expansion for 'Britio', a citadel of Edessa, present day Şanlıurfa in Turkey. The name of the king of Edessa contemporaneous with Pope Eleutherius was Lucius Aelius Aurelius Abgar VIII.

== Des grantz geanz ==
Des grantz geanz ("Of the Great Giants"), a 14th-century Anglo-Norman poem, contains a variant story regarding Albion, the oldest recorded name for Britain, and also contains a slightly different list of kings. The poem states that a colony of exiled Greek royals led by a queen called Albina first founded Britain but before their settlement "no one dwelt there". Albina subsequently gave her name first to Britain, which was later renamed Britain after Brutus. The poem also attempts by euhemerism to rationalise the legends of giants; Albina is thus described as being "very tall", but is presented as a human queen, a descendant of a Greek king, not a mythological creature.

The Albina myth is also found in some later manuscripts of Wace's Roman de Brut (1155), attached as a prologue.

== Scota ==
Scota, in Scottish mythology, and pseudohistory, is the name given to the mythological daughter of an Egyptian pharaoh to whom the Gaels and Scots traced their ancestry. Scota first appeared in literature from the 11th or 12th century and most modern scholars interpret the legends surrounding her to have emerged to rival Geoffrey of Monmouth's claims that the descendants of Brutus (through Albanactus) founded Scotland. However some early Irish sources also refer to the Scota legends and not all scholars regard the legends as fabrications or as political constructions. In the Scottish origin myths, Albanactus had little place and Scottish chroniclers (e.g., John of Fordun and Walter Bower) claimed that Scota was the eponymous founder of Scotland and the Scots long before Albanactus, during the time of Moses.

== Monarchs derived from Geoffrey of Monmouth ==
Geoffrey synchronises some of his monarchs with figures and events from the Bible, Greek, Roman and Irish legends, and recorded history. These are given in the "Synchronisation" column of the table below. Geoffrey dated Brutus' arrival in Britain (and subsequent founding of the Trojan-British monarchy) to 1115 BC. Geoffrey's book was later retold by Wace (in French) and Layamon (in Middle English); the final column represents Layamon's version.

Kingdom				Synchronisation		Layamon's Brut
England	Scotland	Wales	Cornwall	Other	Bible	Layamon's Brut
Brutus I (24 years)			Corineus	Aeneas Silvius (1112–1081 BC)	Eli (12th century BC)	=
Locrinus (10 years)	Albanactus (10 years)	Camber (10 years)	Gwendolen (65 years)			=
Gwendolen (15 years)			Gwendolen (65 years)			=
Maddan (40 years)			Gwendolen (65 years)	Aeneas Silvius (1112–1081 BC), Homer (8th/7th century BC)	Samuel	Madan
Mempricius (20 years)				Eurystheus	Saul (r. 1049–1010 BC)	Membriz
Ebraucus (40 to 60 years)					David (r. 1010–970 BC)	Ebrauc
Brutus II Greenshield (12 years)						Brutus Greenshield
Leil (25 years)					Solomon (r. 971–931 BC)	Leil
Rud Hud Hudibras (39 years)					Haggai, Amos, Joel, Azariah	Ruhudibras
Bladud (20 years)					Elijah (9th century BC)	Bladud
Leir (60 years)						Leir
Cordelia (5 years)						Cordoille
Marganus I (north of the Humber) and Cunedagius (south of the Humber) (2 years)						Morgan & Cunidagius
Cunedagius (33 years)				Romulus (8th century BC)	Isaiah, Hosea (8th century BC)	Cunidagius
Rivallo						Riwald
Gurgustius						Gurgustius
Sisillius I						Silvius
Jago						Lago
Kimarcus						Mark
Gorboduc						Gorbodiago
War between Ferrex and Porrex I						Ferreus & Porreus
Civil war; Britain divided under five unnamed kings						
Pinner	Staterius	Rudaucus	Cloten			
Pinner	Staterius	Rudaucus	Dunvallo Molmutius			
Dunvallo Molmutius (40 years)						Donwallo Molineus
Brennius (north of the Humber) and Belinus (south of the Humber)				Sack of Rome (387 BC)		Belin & Brennes
Belinus						
Gurguit Barbtruc				Partholón		Gurguint
Guithelin						Guncelin
Marcia (regent)						
Sisillius II						Sillius
Kinarius						Rumarus
Danius						Damus
Morvidus						Morbidus
Gorbonianus						Gorbonian
Archgallo						Argal
Elidurus (5 years)						Elidur
Archgallo (restored) (10 years)						Argal
Elidurus (restored)						Elidur
Peredurus (north of the Humber) and Ingenius (south of the Humber) (7 years)						Peredur, Jugenes
Peredurus						
Elidurus (restored)						Elidur
A son of Gorbonianus						Lador
Marganus II						Morgan
Enniaunus						Ænmaunus
Idvallo						Iwallo
Runo						Rime
Gerennus						Goronces
Catellus						Catulus
Millus						Coillus
Porrex II						Porex
Cherin						=
Fulgenius						Fulgenius
Edadus						Aldus
Andragius						Androgus
Urianus						Urrian
Eliud						=
Cledaucus						Cledus
Clotenus						Doten
Gurgintius						Gurguiricius
Merianus						Merian
Bledudo						
Cap						Cap
Oenus						Oein
Sisillius III						Sillius
Beldgabred						Blaðgabreast
Archmail						Arkinaus
Eldol						Ældolf
Redon						Redion
Redechius						Redært
Samuil Penessil (or Samuil, followed by Penessil)						Famul-Penicel
Pir						Pir
Capoir						Capor
Digueillus						Eligille
Heli (40 years)						Heli
Lud						Lud
Cassibelanus				Julius Caesar's invasions of Britain (55–54 BC)		Cassibelaune
Tenvantius						Tennancius
Cunobeline				Augustus (30 BC – 14 AD)	Jesus (3 BC – 33 AD)	Kinbelin
Guiderius				Togodumnus (d. AD 43) during Claudius's conquest of Britain		Wiðer
Arvirargus				Claudius (10 BC – AD 54), Vespasian (AD 69–79)	Mark the Evangelist, Paul of Tarsus (1st century AD)	
Marius						
Coilus						
Lucius (d. AD 156)				Pope Eleuterus (174–189)		
Interregnum; war between Severus and Sulgenius				Septimius Severus (Roman emperor 193–211)		
Geta				Publius Septimius Geta (Roman emperor 209–211)		
Bassianus (Caracalla)				Caracalla (Roman emperor 211–217)		
Carausius				Carausian Revolt (289–296)		
Allectus				Allectus assassinated Carausius in 293		
Asclepiodotus (10 years)				Asclepiodotus and Constantius Chlorus retook Britain in 296		
Coel						
Constantius (11 years)				Constantius Chlorus, Roman emperor 293–306		
Constantine I				Constantine I, Roman emperor 306–337		
Octavius						
Trahern						
Octavius (restored)						
Maximianus (with Dionotus later as regent)			Caradocus, then Dionotus	Magnus Maximus, Roman usurper-emperor 383–388		
Gracianus Municeps						
Interregnum; end of Roman rule						
Constantine II				Constantine III, Roman usurper-emperor 407–411		
Constans				Constans II, Roman usurper-emperor 409–411		
Vortigern						
Vortimer				Germanus of Auxerre (378–448), Battle of Aylesford (455)		
Aurelius Ambrosius						
Uther Pendragon						
Arthur				Battle of Badon (c. AD 500), St. Dubricius (c. AD 465 – c. 550)		
Constantine III						
Aurelius Conanus (2 years)				Aurelius Caninus, 6th-century king of Gwent or Powys; Cynan Garwyn (582–610), king of Powys		
Vortiporius (4 years)				Vortiporius, 6th-century king of Dyfed		
Malgo				Maelgwn Gwynedd, 6th-century king of Gwynedd		
Keredic						
Interregnum; Saxons occupy England		Margaduc (Demetia) and Cadvan (Venedotia)	Blederic	Augustine of Canterbury (arrived in Britain in 597)		
Cadvan				Cadfan ap Iago, 6th/7th-century king of Gwynedd		
Cadwallo				Cadwallon ap Cadfan, 7th-century king of Gwynedd, d. 634		
Cadwallader (d. AD 689)				Cadwaladr ap Cadwallon, 7th-century king of Gwynedd		

After the death of Cadwallader, the kings of the Brythons were reduced to such a small domain that they ceased to be kings of the whole Brythonic-speaking area. Two of his relatives, Yvor and Yni, led the exiles back from Brittany, but were unable to re-establish a united kingship. The Anglo-Saxon invaders ruled the south-eastern part of the island of Great Britain, which would become England, after that point in time under the Bretwaldas and later the kings of England. The heirs to the Celtic-British throne continued through the Welsh kings of Gwynedd until that line was forced to submit itself to the Plantagenets in the 13th century. Princes and lords of Gwynedd ruled until the reign of Dafydd III, who ruled from 1282 to 1283. His death marked the end of the house of Brutus. Owen Tudor, grandfather of Henry VII of England, was a maternal descendant of the kings of Gwynedd; Henry's marriage with Elizabeth of York thus signified the merging of the two royal houses (as well as the feuding houses of York and Lancaster).

== Forgeries ==
=== Pseudo-Berossus ===
Annius of Viterbo in 1498 claimed to have found ancient fragments from Berossus detailing the earliest settlement of 'Celtica', including the British Isles, by Samothes, a son of Japheth, son of Noah, after the Great Flood. These fragments were later revealed to have been forged by Annius himself, and are now known as "Pseudo-Berossus". The fragments can be found in Asher (1993) and include a king list. Before being revealed as a hoax, the list found its way into John Bale's Illustrium majoris Britanniae scriptorum (1548), John Caius' Historia Cantabrigiensis Academiae (1574), William Harrison's Description of England (1577), Holinshed's Chronicles (1587) and Anthony Munday's A briefe chronicle (1611).

=== Iolo Morganwg's Welsh Kings ===
Iolo Morganwg, between 1801 and 1807, published a series of Welsh Triads he claimed to have discovered in manuscript form, with the help of the antiquarian William Owen Pughe. These were later revealed to be a mixture of forgeries by Morganwg and Williams' alterations to authentic triads. Exactly how much "authentic" content there is of Morganwg's published work remains disputed by scholars today. Morganwg's triads describe the earliest occupation of Britain (Prydain) and contain a pseudo-historical reign of kings, beginning with Hu Gadarn, the "Plough King".

Hu Gadarn is described by Morganwg in his triads as being the earliest inhabitant of Britain having travelled from the "Summerland, called Deffrobani, where Constantinople now stands" in 1788 BC. He is credited as having founded the first civilisation in Britain and introduced agriculture. Morganwg's Barddas (1862, p. 348) further states that this king is descended from Hu, but that, after a huge flood (see Afanc), only two people, Dwyfan and Dwyfach, survived from whom the later inhabitants of Britain descended. The Welsh clergyman Edward Davies included this myth in his Celtic Researches on the Origin, Traditions and Languages of the Ancient Britons (1804):

First, the bursting of the lake of waters, and the overwhelming of the face of all lands, so that all mankind drowned, excepting Dwyvan and Dwyvach, who escaped in a naked vessel and from then the Island of Britain was re-peopled.

Several 19th-century Christian authors—for example, Henry Hoyle Howorth—interpreted this myth to be evidence for the Biblical flood of Noah, yet in Morganwg's chronology Dwyfan and Dwyfach are dated to the 18th or 17th century BC, which does not fit the Biblical estimate for the Noachian deluge.

=== Tea Tephi ===
Tea Tephi is a legendary princess found described in British Israelite literature from the 19th century. Revd F. R. A. Glover, M.A., of London in 1861 published England, the Remnant of Judah, and the Israel of Ephraim in which he claimed Tea Tephi was one of Zedekiah's daughters. Since King Zedekiah of Judah had all his sons killed during the Babylonian Captivity, no male successors could continue the throne of King David, but, as Glover noted, Zedekiah had daughters who escaped death (Jeremiah 43:6). Glover believed that Tea Tephi was a surviving Judahite princess who had escaped and travelled to Ireland, and who married a local High King of Ireland in the 6th century BC who subsequently became blood linked to the British monarchy. This theory was later expanded upon by Rev. A.B. Grimaldi, who published in 1877 a successful chart entitled Pedigree of Queen Victoria from the Bible Kings and later by W.M.H. Milner in his booklet The Royal House of Britain an Enduring Dynasty' (1902, revised 1909). Charles Fox Parham also authored an article tracing Queen Victoria's lineage back to King David (through Tea Tephi) entitled Queen Victoria: Heir to King David's Royal Throne.

The Tea Tephi-British monarchy link is also found in J. H. Allen's Judah's Sceptre and Joseph's Birthright (1902, p. 251). A central tenet of British Israelism is that the British monarchy is from the Davidic line and the legend of Tea Tephi from the 19th century attempted to legitimise this claim. Tea Tephi, however, has never been traced to an extant Irish source before the 19th century and critics assert she was purely a British Israelite invention. A collection of alleged bardic traditions and Irish manuscripts which detail Tea Tephi were published by J. A. Goodchild in 1897 as The Book of Tephi. the work is, however, considered pseudo-historical or a forgery.

There is though a queen called Tea in Irish mythology who appears in the Annals of the Kingdom of Ireland. She is described as the wife of Érimón a Míl Espáine (Milesian) and dated to 1700 BC (Geoffrey Keating: 1287 BC). These dates are inconsistent with the British Israelite literature which dates Tea Tephi to the 6th century BC, but later British Israelites, such as Herman Hoeh (Compendium of World History, 1970), claimed that the Milesian Royal House (including Tea) was from an earlier blood descendant of the Davidic Line who entered Britain around 1000 BC (citing Ruaidhrí Ó Flaithbheartaigh's reduced chronology). Linked to Glover's original claims of Tea Tephi, are Grimaldi and Milner's theory that Jeremiah himself in the company of his scribe Baruch ben Neriah travelled to Ireland with Tea Tephi and that they are found described in Irish folklore and old Irish manuscripts. Some British Israelites identify Baruch ben Neriah with a figure called Simon Berac or Berak in Irish myth, while Jeremiah with Ollom Fotla (or Ollam, Ollamh Fodhla). However, like Tea Tephi, there has long been controversy about these identifications, mainly because of conflicting or inconsistent dates. In 2001, the British-Israel-World Federation wrote an article claiming they no longer subscribed to these two identifications, but still strongly stick to the belief that the British monarchy is of Judahite origin. In an earlier publication in 1982, Covenant Publishing Co. admitted that Tea Tephi could not be traced in Irish literature or myth and may have been fabricated by Glover, but they clarified they still believed in the Milesian Royal House-Davidic Line bloodline connection (popularised by Hoeh). Herbert Armstrong (1986) also took up this legendary connection.

== See also ==
- List of governors of Roman Britain
- List of legendary rulers of Cornwall
- List of kings in Wales from the Matter of Britain
- Bretwalda, an Old English word meaning 'ruler of Britain' used in the Anglo-Saxon Chronicle to refer to some Anglo-Saxon kings

== Sources ==
- Geoffrey of Monmouth, Historia Regum Britanniae (1136) – online at Wikisource
- Pseudo-Berossus, The Travels of Noah into Europe – online at Annomundi.com
- Raphael Holinshed, Chronicles: "The History of England" Vol 1 – online at Project Gutenberg
- John Milton, "The History of Britain", Prose Works Vol 2 – online at The Online Library of Liberty

== Bibliography ==
- Asher, R. E. (1993). National Myths in Renaissance France: Francus, Samothes and the Druids. Edinburgh University Press.
- Charles W. Dunn, in a revised translation of Sebastian Evans, History of the Kings of Britain by Geoffrey of Monmouth. E.P. Dutton: New York. 1958. ISBN 0-525-47014-X
- John Morris. The Age of Arthur: A History of the British Isles from 350 to 650. Barnes & Noble Books: New York. 1996 (originally 1973). ISBN 0-7607-0243-8
- John Jay Parry and Robert Caldwell. Geoffrey of Monmouth in Arthurian Literature in the Middle Ages, Roger S. Loomis (ed.). Clarendon Press: Oxford University. 1959. ISBN 0-19-811588-1
- Brynley F. Roberts, Geoffrey of Monmouth and Welsh Historical Tradition, Nottingham Medieval Studies, 20 (1976), 29–40.
- J. S. P. Tatlock. The Legendary History of Britain: Geoffrey of Monmouth's Historia Regum Britanniae and its early vernacular versions. University of California Press. Berkeley. 1950.
