= Guithelin =

King of Britain
- Predecessor: Gurguit Barbtruc
- Successor: Marcia (Regent); Sisillius II
- Spouse: Marcia
- Issue: Sisillius II
- Father: Gurguit Barbtruc

Guithelin was a legendary king of the Britons as accounted by Geoffrey of Monmouth. He became king after the death of Gurguit Barbtruc and reigned approximately 379 BC.

He ruled liberally and temperately for his life. His Queen consort was an artisan and noblewoman named Marcia; when he died, his wife took over the government as regent for their son, Sisillius II.

Legendary titles
Preceded by Gurguit Barbtruc	King of Britain	Succeeded by Marcia (Regent); Sisillius II
