= Richard Niccols =

English poet and editor

Richard Niccols (1584–1616) was an English poet and editor.

== Life ==
Niccols was born in London in 1584. He may have been the son of Richard Niccols who entered the Inner Temple in 1575, and who wrote 'A Treatise setting forth the Mystery of our Salvation,' and 'A Day Star for Dark Wandring Souls; showing the light by a Christian Controversy' (posthumous, 1613).

The younger Richard Niccols accompanied Charles Howard, 1st Earl of Nottingham's 1596 expedition against Cádiz, and was on board the admiral's ship Ark at the taking of the city. He matriculated at Magdalen College, Oxford, on 20 November 1602, but then migrated to Magdalen Hall, where he graduated B.A. on 20 May 1606.

Coming to London, he studied Edmund Spenser's works, and wrote poetry somewhat in Spenser's manner. The families of the Earl of Nottingham, Sir Thomas Wroth, and James Hay, 1st Earl of Carlisle, were his major literary patrons.

== Works ==
As a student, Niccols produced his earliest publication, on the death of Elizabeth I. In 1607 appeared a narrative poem called The Cuckow, with the motto "At etiam cubat cuculus, surge amator, in domum". The volume, which is dedicated to Master Thomas Wroth, and was printed by F[elix] K[ingston], has no author's name, but in his later Winter Nights Vision Niccols describes himself as having "Cuckow-like" sung "in rustick tunes of Castaes wrongs". It tells the story of a contest between the cuckoo and nightingale for supremacy in song; it imitates Edmund Spenser, who is eulogised. The work may have been suggested by Drayton's Owl, 1604.

Niccols's undertook a revised edition of the Mirror for Magistrates, which had originally been issued in 1559. Since its first appearance (William Baldwin), nine editions had appeared with continuations by Thomas Blenerhasset, John Higgins, and others. The previous edition under Higgins was dated 1587. In 1610 Niccols's version was printed by Felix Kingston. (Note: In an address to the reader Niccols stated that he had rearranged the old poems and improved their rhythm, and had added many new poems of his own. He also omitted Baldwin's James I of Scotland, Francis Segar's Richard, Duke of Gloucester, the anonymous James IV of Scotland, and Francis Dingley's Battle of Flodden Field.) His main additions were inserted towards the close of the volume, and were introduced by a new title-page: "A Winter Nights Vision. Being an addition of such princes especially famous who were exempted in the former historie". The princes dealt with by Niccols include King Arthur, Edmund Ironside, Richard I, King John, Edward II, Edward V, Richard, duke of York, and Richard III. Niccols dedicated his own contribution to the Earl of Nottingham, and prefaced it with a "poeticall Induction". There followed, with another title-page and separately numbered pages, Niccols's England's Eliza, or the victorious and triumphant Reigne of that Virgin Empresse of sacred memorie, Elizabeth, Queene of England, France, and Ireland, &c. The dedication was addressed to Elizabeth, wife of Sir Francis Clere. Another poetical induction precedes the poem on Elizabeth, which, Niccols states, he wrote at Greenwich, apparently in August 1603, when the plague raged in London. Niccols's edition of the Mirror was reissued in 1619 and 1628. All Niccols's continuations are reprinted in Joseph Haslewood's edition of 1815.

On 15 February 1612 a play by Niccols, entitled The Twynnes Tragedie, was entered on the Stationers' Registers It is not otherwise known. But in 1655 William Rider published a tragi-comedy called The Twins, which Frederick Gard Fleay suggested may be a printed copy of Niccols's piece.

Niccols also issued:

- Three precious teares of blood, flowing … in memory of the vertues … of … Henry the Great, a translation from the French, printed with the French original, London (by John Budge);
- The Three Sisters Teares: shed at the late solemne funerals of the royall deceased Henry, Prince of Wales, London, 1613, dedicated to Lady Honor Hay;
- The Furies with Vertues Encomium, or the Image of Honour in two bookes of Epigrammes satyricall and encomiasticke, London (by William Stansby), 1614, dedicated to Sir Timothy Thornhill (reprinted in Harleian Miscellany, x. 1 seq.);
- Monodia, or Waltham's Complaint upon the death of the Lady Honor Hay, London (by W. S. for Richard Meighen and Thomas Jones), 1615, dedicated to Edward, Lord Denny, Lady Honor's father (reprinted in Harleian Miscellany, x. 11 seq.);
- London's Artillery, briefly containing the noble practise of that worthie Societie: with the moderne and ancient martiall exercises, natures of armes, vertue of magistrates, antiquitie, glory, and chronography of this honourable cittie, London, 1616, dedicated to Sir John Jolles;
- Sir Thomas Overbvrie's Vision with the ghoasts of Weston, Mris Turner, the late Lieftenant of the Tower, and Franklin, by R. N., Oxon. … Printed for R. M. & T. I. 1616—a poetical narrative of Sir Thomas Overbury's murder. It was reprinted in the Harleian Miscellany (vii. 178 seq.) and by the Hunterian Club, Glasgow, in 1873, with an introduction by James Maidment.

An anonymous work, The Begger's Ape, a poem, London, 1627, was published posthumously. Niccols seems to claim it for himself in the induction to Winter Nights Vision. In it the author apparently imitated Spenser's Mother Hubberd's Tale.
