= Gerennus =

Legendary king of the Britons

Gerennus (Welsh: Geraint map Elidyr) was a legendary king of the Britons as recounted by Geoffrey of Monmouth. He came to power in 275BC.

He was a son of King Elidurus and was succeeded by his son Catellus. According to Geoffrey, his descendants ruled Britain through the time of the Roman invasion of Britain.

Legendary titles
Preceded by Runo	King of Britain	Succeeded by Catellus
