= Digueillus =

Legendary king of the Britons

Digueillus (also Cligueillus or Eligueillus; Welsh: Llefelys) was a legendary king of the Brythons according to Geoffrey of Monmouth. He was the son of King Capoir and succeeded by his son Heli. He came to power in 113BC.

Geoffrey portrays him as a wise and modest ruler who cared greatly about the administration of justice among the Brythons.

Legendary titles
Preceded by Capoir	King of Britain	Succeeded by Heli
