= Edadus =

King of Britons

Edadus was a legendary king of the Britons as recounted by Geoffrey of Monmouth in his Historia Regum Britanniae. He came to power in 239BC.

He was the second son of King Cherin and succeeded by his brother Andragius.

Legendary titles
Preceded by Fulgenius	King of Britain	Succeeded by Andragius
