= Eliud =

Legendary king of the Britons

Eliud, also known as Elihud, was a legendary king of the Britons, as recounted by Geoffrey of Monmouth. He came to power in 221 BC.

He was preceded by Urianus and succeeded by Cledaucus. He is otherwise unattested.

Legendary titles
| Preceded by Urianus | King of Britain | Succeeded by Cledaucus |
