= Queen Marcia =

Queen regnant of the Britons

Marcia was the legendary third female ruler and a regent of the Britons, as recounted by Geoffrey of Monmouth. She is presented by Geoffrey as "one of the most illustrious and praiseworthy of women in early British history".

== Mythical account ==
Marcia became Queen consort when she married Guithelin (Welsh: Kyhylyn) and ruled as regent for her son, Sisillius II. In her youth, she was a noblewoman and knowledgeable in all the arts.

Queen Marcia ruled Britain for about five years after Guithelin's death because their son was just seven years old at the time.

Geoffrey says that Queen Marcia was a learned woman who codified the Marcian Laws, the Lex Martiana. King Alfred the Great was later to translate the code into Old English as the basis of Mercian Laws, believing them to have been named after the much later Saxon kingdom of Mercia.

Sisillius (Welsh: Saessyllt), came to the throne in ca 358 BC on Queen Marcia's death.

Legendary titles
| Preceded by Guithelin | Regent of Britain | Succeeded by Sisillius II |
