= Sawyl Penuchel =

British king of the sub-Roman period

Sawyl Penuchel or Ben Uchel ("high-head", "arrogant"), also known as Samuil Penissel ("low-head", "humble"), was a King of the Britons of the sub-Roman period, who appears in old Welsh genealogies and the Welsh Triads.

The genealogies, in which he appears under both epithets, make him the son of Pabo Post Prydain, a descendant of Coel Hen, the presumed king of the Old North. John Morris locates Sawyl in the south Pennines area (the modern Peak District, a name which may date from its settlement by the Anglian Pecset). He is listed as one of the "Three Arrogant Men of the Island of Britain" in the Welsh Triads.

Other genealogies say he was the father of St. Asaph. Elis Gruffydd's Chronicle says that his daughter married Maelgwn Gwynedd. An Irish genealogy says that a "Samuel Chendisel" married Deichter, daughter of Muiredach Muinderg, the king of Ulster, and they had two sons: Sanctan, who became bishop of Cil-dá-les and founded Kilnasantan in County Dublin, and Matóc Ailithir. The Irish Liber Hymnorum confirms that both Sanctan and Matóc came to Ireland from Britain.

According to the Welsh Life of Saint Cadoc, a king named Sawyl Penuchel held court at Allt Cunedda near Kidwelly in Carmarthenshire. Cadoc pursued Sawyl's warband after they stole food from Llancarfan Abbey. He found them sleeping under a tree and cut off their hair, before fleeing to a nearby bog. When Sawyl and his men gave chase, they all drowned in the bog. Whether this is the same king, having fled to Wales after his northern kingdom was overrun by the Angles, a different man of the same name, or simply an error by the composer of the Life, is unclear. This Sawyl was supposedly buried in a nearby mound known as Banc Benuchel.

When this mound was excavated in 1850, a large body covered with a hexagonal stone imitating a battle-shield was discovered, which people have presumed to have been the remains of Sawyl Penuchel. The skeleton was described as male and the age at death was estimated at 30 years on the basis of the teeth. Precise measurements which were supplied in report in the 1851 Archaeologia Cambrensis and a subsequent report in The Welshman stated that the skull "was 21½ ins in its horizontal circumference 6½ ins broad and 7½ ins long ... The thigh bones were perfect and 20½ ins long, and the fibula of the arm was 11 ins". According to this account, the remains were re-interred "apart from the teeth and two or three vertebra which were kept as souvenirs". Later inquiries made with local people who remembered the original excavation (the work was led by Mr Fitzwilliam, on whose land one of the tumuli stood, accompanied by Mr Fenton of Glynmel, Fishguard) recalled that "they came to a very large flat stone which gave them a lot of trouble to remove. When it was done the skeleton of a large, powerful man was discovered in a sitting position and facing south." The bones, especially the legs, were of "large size" and the skull "had a hole in it". Asked what became of the skeleton, the witnesses agreed that the landowner (Fitzwilliam) had them sent to London - but where precisely was not clear. A subsequent excavation in 1881 resulted in no body being found; this suggested that the 1851 report in Archaeologia Cambrensis, which stated that the bones were re-interred, may not have been entirely true. Inquiries made in 1937 about the whereabouts of the remains of Sawyl were inconclusive.

Geoffrey of Monmouth, in his History of the Kings of Britain (1136), uses the name Samuil Penessil for a legendary pre-Roman king of Britain, preceded by Redechius and succeeded by Pir.

Legendary titles
Preceded by Redechius	King of Britain	Succeeded by Pir
