= Cap of Britain =

Legendary king of the Britons

Cap (Welsh: Caff) was a legendary king of the Britons as accounted by Geoffrey of Monmouth. He came to power in 185 BC.

He was preceded by Bledudo and succeeded by Oenus.

Legendary titles
Preceded by Bledudo	King of Britain	Succeeded by Oenus
