= Kimarcus =

King of Britain
- Predecessor: Jago
- Successor: Gorboduc
- Issue: Gorboduc
- Father: Sisillius I

Kimarcus (Welsh: Cynfarch) was a legendary king of the Britons according to Geoffrey of Monmouth. He was the son of Sisillius I, but after Sisillius's reign ended, Jago became king instead.

Kimarcus became king of Britain after Jago, and was in turn succeeded by Gorboduc. Geoffrey has nothing to say of him beyond this.

Legendary titles
Preceded by Jago	King of Britain	Succeeded by Gorboduc
