= Urianus =

Legendary king of the Britons

Urianus was a legendary king of the Britons as accounted by Geoffrey of Monmouth. He came to power in 227 BC.

He was the son of King Andragius and was succeeded by Eliud. Geoffrey may possibly have based the character on that of Urien Rheged (6th century), although there is no resemblance between them.

Legendary titles
Preceded by Andragius	King of Britain	Succeeded by Eliud
