= Enniaunus =

Legendary king of the Britons

Enniaunus (Welsh: Einion mab Arthal) was a legendary king of the Britons as recounted by Geoffrey of Monmouth. He came to power in 293BC.

He was the son of King Archgallo and brother of Marganus II. According to Geoffrey, he ruled poorly and harshly causing him to be deposed due to tyranny. He was replaced with his cousin, Idvallo.

Legendary titles
Preceded by Marganus II	King of Britain	Succeeded by Idvallo
