= Cherin =

Legendary king of the Britons

Cherin was a legendary king of the Britons as recounted in Geoffrey of Monmouth's Historia Regum Britanniae. He came to power in 251 BC.

His father was King Porrex II and he was succeeded by his three sons in turn, Fulgenius, Edadus, and Andragius.

Legendary titles
Preceded by Porrex II	King of Britain	Succeeded by Fulgenius
