= Mempricius =

Legendary king of the Britons

King of Britain
- Reign: fl. 1060BCE
- Predecessor: Maddan
- Successor: Ebraucus
- Issue: Ebraucus
- Father: Maddan

Mempricius (Welsh: Membyr) was a legendary king of the Britons, as recounted by Geoffrey of Monmouth. He came to power in 1060BC. He was the son of King Maddan, brother of Malin, and father of king Ebraucus.

== War ==
Upon his father's death, war broke out between Mempricius and his brother, Malin, over who would dominate Britain. Mempricius called a conference with his brother and other delegates to end the war between the two brothers. Once there, Mempricius killed Malin and took the throne of the Britons for himself.

== Tyranny ==
He ruled as a tyrant for 20 years, killing most of the distinguished men on the island. More so, he defeated and killed all other claimants to the throne. He abandoned his wife and his son, Ebraucus, to live a life of sodomy.

According to Geoffrey of Monmouth, he reigned at the same period of time as Saul, the King in Judea, and Eurysthenes, King in Sparta.

== Death ==
While on a hunting expedition, he was separated from his companions and attacked by a pack of wolves. He died and was succeeded by his son Ebraucus as monarch.

== Notes ==
Legendary titles
Preceded by Maddan	King of Britain	Succeeded by Ebraucus
