= Morvidus =

King of Britain
- Reign: 341-336BC
- Predecessor: Danius
- Successor: Gorbonianus
- Issue: Ingenius of Britain; Peredurus; Archgallo; Elidurus; Gorbonianus
- Father: Danius

Morvidus (Welsh: Morydd map Daned) was a legendary king of the Britons from 341 to 336 BC, as recounted by Geoffrey of Monmouth. He reigned from 355 BC. He was the illegitimate son of Danius by his mistress Tangustela.

== Life ==
Geoffrey portrays him as being an ill-tempered yet kind ruler most of the time. Most of the time he gave out gifts handsomely. During his reign, the king of the Morini invaded Northumberland and laid waste to the countryside. Morvidus met the king of Moriani in battle and defeated the invaders. After the battle, he had every captive soldier brought before him and personally killed each one, feeding his lust for blood. When he became tired, he skinned and burned the remaining soldiers.

He fought and killed a giant using an uprooted tree stripped of bark and branches. For this reason, he is associated with the symbol of a ragged staff, which appears in the crest of the Earl of Warwick who are believed to be descended from Morvidus.

Later in his reign, a dragon or monster appeared from the Irish Sea and began devouring the inhabitants of the western shores. In an attempt to stop this, Morvidus met the beast in single-combat and used every weapon he could against her, but to no avail. The monster lunged at Morvidus and consumed him. Morvidus had five sons: Gorbonianus, Archgallo, Elidurus, Ingenius, and Peredurus, all of which became kings of the Britons. Of these five sons, Gorbonianus, the eldest, was his direct successor.

== Sources ==
Legendary titles
Preceded by Danius	King of Britain	Succeeded by Gorbonianus
