= Andragius =

Legendary king of the Britons

Andragius was a legendary king of the Britons as accounted by Geoffrey of Monmouth. He came to power in 233 BC.

He was the youngest son of King Cherin and succeeded by his son Urianus.

Legendary titles
Preceded by Edadus	King of Britain	Succeeded by Urianus
