= Porrex I =

King of Britain
- Predecessor: Gorboduc
- Successor: Civil war; title next held by Dyfnwal Moelmud
- Father: Gorboduc
- Mother: Judon

Porrex I was a fictional prince and possibly king of the Britons in the Matter of Britain, first appearing in Geoffrey of Monmouth's pseudo-history the Historia Regum Britanniae (c. 1136). He was the son of Gorboduc and his death began a civil war.

When Gorboduc had grown old, Porrex began to argue with his brother, Ferrex about who was to be the next king. Porrex was more ambitious, and planned to murder his brother, causing Ferrex to flee to Gaul and enlist the aide of Suhard, the king of the Franks. When Ferrex returned with a large Frankish army, Porrex attacked, killing Ferrex and his army. Some time after, his mother, Judon (or Widen), avenged Porrex's murder of Ferrex and hacked him to pieces in his sleep. His death sparked a long civil war which divided Britain into five kingdoms, and continued until Dunvallo Molmutius managed to reunite Britain.

Geoffrey does not mention when Gorboduc died, and it is unclear whether Porrex outlived him and became king of Britain, or not. Either way, Gorboduc and his sons were the last of the royal house of Brutus, with Dunvallo Molmutius being from the house of Cornwall.

== Later tradition ==
Porrex was a central character in Thomas Norton and Thomas Sackville's play Gorboduc (1561).

Legendary titles
Preceded by Gorboduc	King of Britain	Vacant Civil War Title next held by Dunvallo Molmutius
