= John Higgins (poet) =

English cleric, poet and linguist

John Higgins (c. 1544 – by 1620) was an English cleric, poet and linguist. He is now best known as a contributor to the Mirror for Magistrates series of poetry collections.

== Life ==
Higgins was said by Thomas Hearne to have been a student of Christ Church, Oxford, but his name does not appear in the university register. He taught grammar between 1568 and 1570. By 1574 he was vicar of Winsham in Somerset, where his successor was in post by 1620.

== Works ==
Higgins's major work is The First Parte of the "Mirour for Magistrates" (1574). This expansion of The Mirrour for Magistrates (1559) by William Baldwin added the beginning of traditional British history in Geoffrey of Monmouth, where Baldwin's collection started English history from the reign of Richard II. Sixteen legends, dealing with Albanact, Locrinus, Bladud, Ferrex, Porrex, Nennius, and others, are told in verse "complaints".

Higgins reissued his First Parte in 1575, enlarging his metrical address at the conclusion, and adding a new poem, Irenglass. In 1587 Thomas Newton prepared a collective edition of the original Mirrour and its supplementary volumes. For this edition Higgins prepared 23 further poems: the new series treats of Brennus, Cæsar, Nero, Caracalla, and others. In a later section appears another new poem by him, How the Valiant Knight, Sir Nicholas Burdet, Chiefe Butler of Normandy, was slayne at Pontoise, Anno 1441. Richard Niccols reissued all Higgins's contributions in another collective edition of the Mirrour, published in 1610, and reissued as The Falles of Vnfortvnate Princes in 1619. In 1815 Joseph Haslewood reprinted the whole work.

Other works were:

- A revised edition of the Dictionarie of Richard Huloet, London, 1572 (by Thomas Marshe), dedication to Sir George Peckham.
- Flowers, or Eloquent Phrases of the Latine Speach, gathered out of the sixe Comœdies of Terence, whereof those of the first three were selected by Nicholas Vdall, and those of the latter three nowe to them annexed by John Higgins (1575, new edition 1581, by Thomas Marshe).
- The Nomenclator or Remembrancer of Adrianus Junius, Physician, divided into two Tomes, conteining proper names and apt termes for all things vnder their conuenient titles, London (for Ralph Newberie and Henrie Denham), 1585, dedication to Valentine Dale.
- An Answer to Master William Perkins concerning Christ's Descension into Hell (Oxford, 1602).
