= Ferrex =

Legendary British prince

Ferrex was the son of the legendary king Gorboduc of the Britons, and fought with his brother Porrex for the throne, according to Geoffrey of Monmouth.

When his father had become old, he quarrelled with his brother Porrex over who would succeed to the kingship. Ferrex discovered that Porrex planned to kill him, and fled to Gaul, where he enlisted the help of Suhard, the king of the Franks. Upon his return, he fought a battle with his brother and died there. The Gaulish army was also destroyed.

Ferrex had been his mother Judon's favourite son, and she avenged his death by killing Porrex in his sleep. This led to a long civil war between five kings in Britain.

== Later tradition ==
Ferrex was a central character in Thomas Norton and Thomas Sackville's play Gorboduc (1561).
