= SS North Britain (1945) =

1945 British cargo ship

History
- Name: Empire Cyprus (1945–48); North Britain (1948–62); Jesselton Bay (1962–68)
- Owner: Ministry of War Transport (1945); Ministry of Transport (1945–48); North Shipping Co Ltd (1948–62); Kinabatangan Shipping Co Ltd (1962–68)
- Operator: Charlton, McAllum & Co Ltd (1945–47); Hugh Roberts & Son Ltd (1947–62); United China Shipping Co Ltd (1962–68)
- Port of registry: (United Kingdom) Greenock (1945–48); (United Kingdom) Newcastle upon Tyne (1948–62); Hong Kong (1962–68)
- Builder: Lithgows
- Yard number: 1005
- Launched: 18 April 1945
- Completed: June 1945
- Maiden voyage: 23 June 1945
- Identification: Code Letters GFWV (1945–62)
- Fate: Scrapped in 1968

General characteristics
- Type: Cargo ship
- Tonnage: 7,189 GRT
- Length: 433 ft (132 m)
- Beam: 56 ft (17 m)
- Propulsion: Triple expansion steam engine

North Britain was a 7,189 GRT Cargo ship that was built in 1945 by Lithgows, Port Glasgow as Empire Cyprus for the Ministry of War Transport (MoWT). She was sold into merchant service in 1948 and renamed North Britain. In 1962, she was sold to Hong Kong and renamed Jesselton Bay, serving until 1968 when she was scrapped.

== Description ==
The ship was built in 1945 by Lithgows Ltd, Port Glasgow. She was yard number 1005.

The ship was 433 feet (132 m) long, with a beam of 56 feet (17 m).

The ship was propelled by a triple expansion steam engine.

== History ==
Empire Cyprus was launched on 18 April 1945, and completed in June. She was operated under the management of Charlton, McAllum & Co Ltd. Her port of registry was Greenock and the Code Letters GFWV were allocated. She departed from the Clyde on her maiden voyage on 23 June 1945, bound for New York, United States. Over the next six months, she would visit Port Said, and Suez, Egypt; Colombo, Ceylon; Calcutta, India; and Rangoon and Kyaukpyu, Burma.

In 1947, management was transferred to Hugh Roberts & Son, Newcastle upon Tyne. In 1948, she was sold to North Shipping Co Ltd and renamed North Britain. She remained under the management of Hugh Roberts & Son. On 28 January 1952, North Britain ran aground off Fiji. She was refloated later that day. In 1962, North Britain was sold to Kinabatangan Shipping Co Ltd, Hong Kong and renamed Jesselton Bay. She was operated under the management of United China Shipping Ltd, Hong Kong. She arrived on 2 April 1968 at Kaohsiung, Taiwan for scrapping.
