= North Britain =

Northern part of Great Britain or Scotland

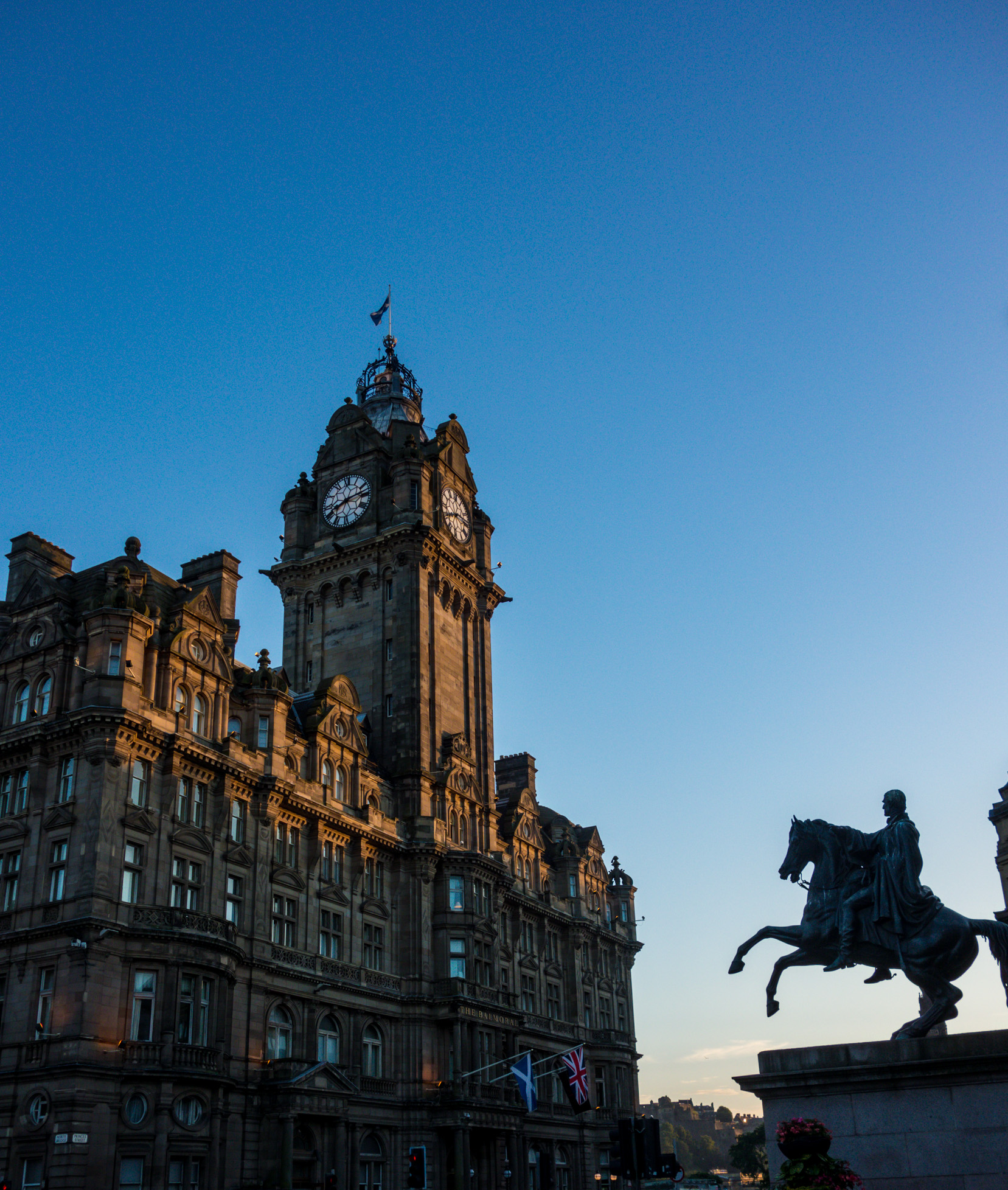
The North British Station Hotel in Edinburgh (now The Balmoral) was the railway hotel (opened 1902) of the North British Railway at Waverley Station. Opposite is the statue by John Steell of Arthur Wellesley, 1st Duke of Wellington, the victor of the Battle of Waterloo, in which the Royal North British Dragoons participated as part of the 2nd Cavalry Brigade, called the "Union Brigade".

North Britain is a term which has been used, particularly between the 17th and 19th centuries, for either the northern part of Great Britain or Scotland, which occupies the northernmost third of the island. "North Britains" could also refer to Britons from Scotland; with North Briton later the standard spelling. Its counterpart was South Britain, generally used to refer to England and Wales.

== Origin ==
Early uses of the designation have been noted after the 1603 Union of the Crowns of the Kingdoms of England and Scotland. In early use the term could refer to inhabitants of Scotland as well as the country itself; since at least the late 15th century, "Britain" could be equivalent to "Briton", even being used interchangeably in early texts. Accordingly, "North Britain" was sometimes used as equivalent to "North Briton". Francis Bacon wrote in 1604 that the union made "The people to be the South-Brittains and North-Brittains". The Oxford English Dictionary cites the poet Richard Brathwait, the play Wit at Several Weapons, and Sir William Mure of Rowallan as early 17th-century appearances of the name for Scotland as a whole.

King James VI and I, the first joint monarch of both kingdoms, used the terms "South Britain" and "North Britain" for England and Scotland respectively, most famously in his royal decree of 1606 establishing the first Union Flag, where Scotland and England are not otherwise named:

Whereas, some differences hath arisen between Our subjects of South and North Britaine travelling by Seas, about the bearing of their Flagges ...

This usage was repeated in Charles I's Proclamation of 1634 on the use of the flag, though adding England and Scotland too for explanation:

Our further will and pleasure is, that all the other Ships of Our Subjects of England or South Britain bearing flags shall from henceforth carry the Red Cross, commonly called S. George's Cross, as of old time hath been used; And also that all other ships of Our Subjects of Scotland or North Britain shall henceforth carry the White Cross commonly called S. Andrews Cross.

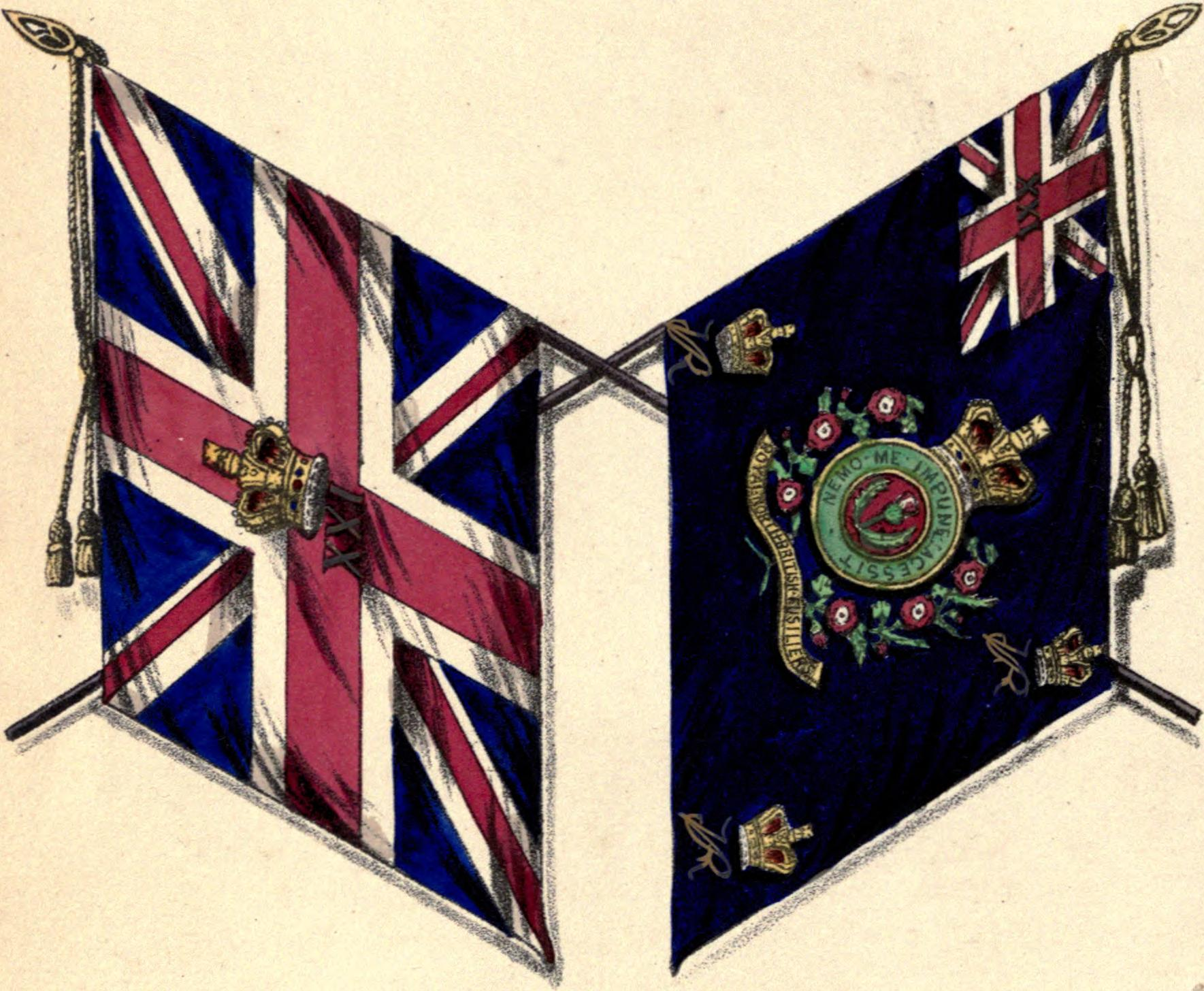
Regimental colours of the 21st (Royal North British Fusiliers) Regiment of Foot depicted in 1849

After the Acts of Union 1707, Scotland was sometimes referred to as "North Britain" officially. In 1707, the Royal Scots Greys were renamed the "Royal North British Dragoons". Similarly, the "Scots" in the name of the Royal Scots Fusiliers was changed to "North British", a name which lasted until 1877, when it became the "21st (Royal Scots Fusiliers) Regiment of Foot". In 1712, The Boston News-Letter in British North America was using the term "North British". The Oxford English Dictionary cites Matthew Prior using the spelling "North Briton" in 1718.

In Rob Roy (1817), Sir Walter Scott refers to a Scottish person in England as a North Briton, sometimes in the mouth of an English character but also in the authorial voice.

"Why, a Scotch sort of a gentleman, as I said before," returned mine host; "they are all gentle, ye mun know, though they ha' narra shirt to back; but this is a decentish hallion—a canny North Briton as e'er cross'd Berwick Bridge — I trow he's a dealer in cattle."

— Scott, Rob Roy

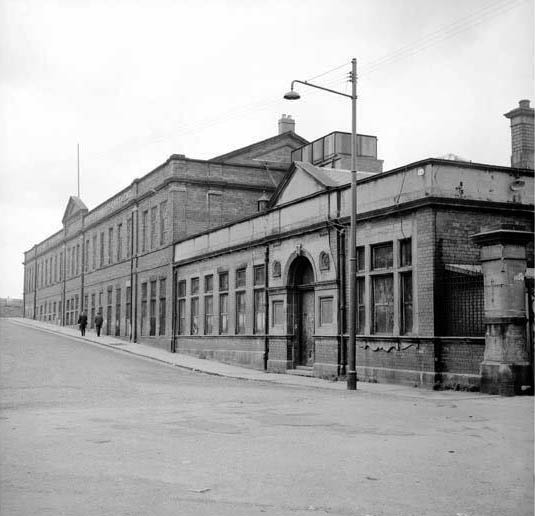
The former Cowlairs railway works, factory of the North British Railway at Springburn, Glasgow

== Historic use ==
"North Britain" is often used historically, referencing the period before the formation of Scotland and England. As such, it forms a geographic, yet politically and culturally neutral description of the area.

The term, particularly in adjective form, found use in the creation of the railway system. The North British Railway operated from 1846 to 1923, leaving a later legacy in the name of the North British Hotel in Edinburgh, which was renamed The Balmoral Hotel in the 1990s. The North British Locomotive Company existed from 1903 until its bankruptcy in 1962, again leaving a naming legacy in other organisations.

North British Distillery Company sign

The name is found in other private enterprises, examples being the Edinburgh North British Insurance Company, founded in 1809, and North British Distillery Company founded there in 1885. The North British Rubber Company was founded in 1856 in Edinburgh's Fountainbridge, notable for its Wellington boots and eventually becoming Hunter Boot Ltd.

An example of its use in respect to northern Great Britain rather than Scotland can be found in the title of the North British Academy of Arts which existed from 1908 to 1924 in Newcastle-upon-Tyne, a city in northern England.

The North Briton and New North Briton were newspapers in the 18th and 19th centuries, and in 1844 there was also a North British Advertiser. The North British Review was founded in 1844 by members of the Free Church of Scotland as a Scottish "national review" for those unsatisfied with the secular Edinburgh Review or the conservative Quarterly Review. It continued until 1871. In 1847 a North British Daily Mail was founded, which was renamed the Glasgow Daily Mail in 1901 and merged with the Glasgow Record the same year, ultimately becoming the Daily Record. Cousin Henry, one of Anthony Trollope's 1879 novels, was serialized in that year in the North British Weekly Mail.

Particularly in the 19th century, "North Britain" or "N.B." was widely used for postal addresses in Scotland. However, by the early 20th century, any vestiges of popular usage of this style had declined. "South Britain", the complementary style apportioned to England, had never seriously established itself, either north or south of the Anglo-Scottish border.

At least two ships were named the SS North Britain: a 1940 vessel torpedoed in 1943, and the 1945 SS North Britain, which was built by Lithgows, Port Glasgow as the Empire Cyprus for the Ministry of War Transport. She was sold into merchant service in 1948 and renamed North Britain. In 1962, she was sold to Hong Kong and renamed Jesselton Bay, scrapped in 1968.

== 21st-century use ==
In current usage, the northern parts of Great Britain are sometimes referred to simply as 'the North', though this term is more frequently used to describe northern England. This usage is often prevalent in social commentary on the suggested "North–South divide".

In 2008 the universities of Aberdeen and Edinburgh, in addition to Heriot-Watt University, organised a North Britain Student Forum on geoscience and engineering topics.

== See also ==
- The North Briton
- West Brit
- South Briton
- Scottish cultural cringe
- North–South divide in the United Kingdom
