= Sisillius II =

Legendary king of the Britons

King of Britain
- Predecessor: Guithelin; Marcia (Regent)
- Successor: Kinarius
- Issue: Kinarius; Danius
- Father: Guithelin
- Mother: Marcia

Sisillius II (Welsh: Seisyllt map Kyhylyn) was a Legendary King of the Britons as recounted by Geoffrey of Monmouth. He came to power in 373BC.

== Legendary account ==
Sisillius II was the son of King Guithelin and Queen Marcia, succeeded by his son Kinarius. Since his father, Guithelin, died when Sisillius was just seven years of age, his mother, Queen Marcia ruled Britain for about five years in his stead as Queen regent. Upon her death, c. 358 BC, Sisillius came to the throne, ruling for the next six years.

His reign was followed by those of his sons Kinarius and Danius.

Legendary titles
Preceded by Guithelin; Marcia (Regent)	King of Britain	Succeeded by Kinarius
