= Ebraucus =

Legendary King of the Britons

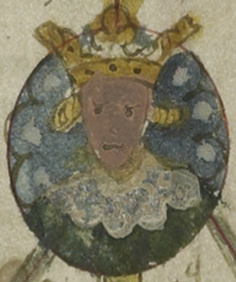
- Ebraucus from the Genealogical Chronicle of the Kings of England to Edward IV (c. 1461)

King of Britain
- Reign: 1006–967 BC
- Predecessor: Mempricius
- Successor: Brutus Greenshield
- Issue: Brutus Greenshield; 19 other sons; 30 daughters (Note: According to the Historia Regum Britanniae, his sons were: "Brutus surnamed Greenshield, Margadud, Sisillius, Regin, Morivid, Bladud, Lagon, Bodloan, Kincar, Spaden, Gaul, Darden, Eldad, Ivor, Gangu, Hector, Kerin, Rud, Assarach, Buel." His daughters were: "Gloigni, Ignogni, Oudas, Guenliam, Gaudid, Angarad, Guendoloe, Tangustel, Gorgon, Medlan, Methahel, Ourar, Malure, Kambreda, Ragan, Gael, Ecub, Nest, Cheum, Stadud, Gladud, Ebren, Blagan, Aballac, Angaes, Galaes, Edra, Anaor, Stadial, Egron.")
- Father: Mempricius

Ebraucus (Welsh: Efrawg/Efrog) was a legendary king of the Britons, as recounted in Geoffrey of Monmouth's pseudohistory Historia Regum Britanniae (c. 1136). Later estimations from the dates given in the text place the events of this story around 1040 BC. He was the son of King Mempricius and father of Brutus Greenshield.

== Historia Regum Britanniae ==
According to the Historia Regum Britanniae, Ebraucus was the son of King Mempricius, who ruled as a tyrant for twenty years, abandoning his wife and young Ebraucus, "and addicted himself to sodomy". Following the death of his father, Ebraucus became king and reigned for 39 years. He is described as being admired, tall, and remarkably strong. He was the first to wage war on the Gauls since the time of Brutus. By pillaging the cities and shores and slaughtering many men, he became extremely wealthy and enriched the lands of Britain.

He founded two settlements: Kaerebrauc, the City of Ebraucus (Eboracum), north of the Humber (this later became York, whose Welsh name is Efrog); and Alclud in Albany (now part of Dunbarton, capital of Strathclyde).

He had twenty wives who produced twenty sons and thirty daughters, including Galaes "the most celebrated beauty at that time in Britain or Gaul". All his daughters he sent to his cousin Silvius Alba in Alba Longa (Italy) to be married to the other Trojan descendants. Except for Brutus Greenshield, all of Ebraucus's sons, led by Assaracus, (Note: Bearing the mythical name of the second son of Tros, King of Dardania, and also the name of his great-great-grandfather Brutus' Greek ally, who fought against King Pandrasus of Greece.) went to Germany, creating a kingdom there. Brutus Greenshield thus succeeded Ebraucus upon his death.

== Later tradition ==
"Brutus" (c. 1190), the first major poem based on the Historia Regum Britanniae, was written to celebrate the founding of York, and ends with lines about Ebraucus:

He founded York, which from him took its name,
Eboracum, and he adorned it well.

Alexander Neckam's De laudibus divinae sapientiae (c. 1213) also mentions him, saying "Behold what a city the blessed Ebraucus built!"

Others expanded on the story of Ebraucus, including two chronicles of the Church of York from the fourteenth century. According to Polydore Vergil he "builded the town of Maidens, now called Edinburgh Castle, being planted in the uttermost part of Britain, now called Scotland". The Registrum Malmesburiense also says he built the "castle of Montrose". Giacomo Filippo Foresti claimed he founded many cities and reigned sixty years.

When Henry VII reached York on his progress through the country in 1486, he was met by an actor playing Ebraucus, who described himself as "the begynner of the same [citie] callid Ebrauk", who presented Henry with the keys of the city "thenheritaunce [the inheritance] of the said Ebrauk", declared Ebraucus' achievements as conqueror of France, and reminded Henry that Ebraucus, his supposed ancestor, had founded the city, in an attempt to diffuse any potential hostility the king may have felt for its previous support for Richard III.

In York, an ancient statue traditionally said to depict Ebraucus, and called "Old York", stood at the junction of St Saviourgate and Colliergate, where it served as a boundary marker in the fifteenth century. It may originally have been part of a Roman monument. In 1501, the statue was "taken doun, newe maid and transposed from thens" to the Guildhall, and a tablet was inscribed to mark its original location, saying "Here stood the image of York" (this tablet is now in the Yorkshire Museum). According to Thomas Gent, the statue was moved from the site of Mansion House to inside the Guildhall during the construction of Mansion House in 1726. This repaired or replacement statue, which depicted a king in armour, crowned, and holding an orb and sceptre, was transferred to a niche at Bootham Bar city wall gatehouse in 1738, where it remained until 1834.

== Notes ==
Legendary titles
Preceded by Mempricius	King of Britain; 1006–967 BC	Succeeded by Brutus II Greenshield
