= Archgallo =

Legendary king of the Britons

Archgallo (Welsh: Arthal map Morydd) was a legendary king of the Britons as recounted by Geoffrey of Monmouth. He ruled from 339BC. He was the second son of King Morvidus and brother of Gorbonianus.

Archgallo began as an evil king bent on destroying the nobles and undoing all his brother had done. He gained a fortune of stolen wealth from the nobles. This caused the nobles to rebel and they deposed Archgallo and replaced him with his brother, Elidurus.

Archgallo wandered throughout the neighbouring countries for five years without friends or a home until he returned to Britain. While he was wandering in the Forests of Calaterium, his brother, Elidurus, found him and embraced him as a brother. He took him to a nearby city and hid him in a room. For a year, Elidurus faked sickness and required all the nobles of the kingdom to visit him. Once there, Elidurus demanded each pledge their allegiance to Archgallo again or they would be beheaded. They complied and after the last had pledged, Elidurus took Archgallo to York and removed his own crown and reinstated Archgallo's kingship. This story is told by William Wordsworth in his poem Artegal and Elidure.

During Archgallo's second reign, he ruled peacefully and faithfully never reverting to his former ways. For ten years he gave the deserved their proper wealth and administered justice throughout the realm. Finally, he fell into a coma and died. He was buried in Leicester and succeeded by Elidurus. Two of Archgallo's sons would later become kings of Britain; Marganus II and Enniaunus.

Legendary titles
Preceded by Gorbonianus	King of Britain first reign	Succeeded by Elidurus
Preceded by Elidurus	King of Britain second reign	Succeeded by Elidurus
