= Black Book of Basingwerk =

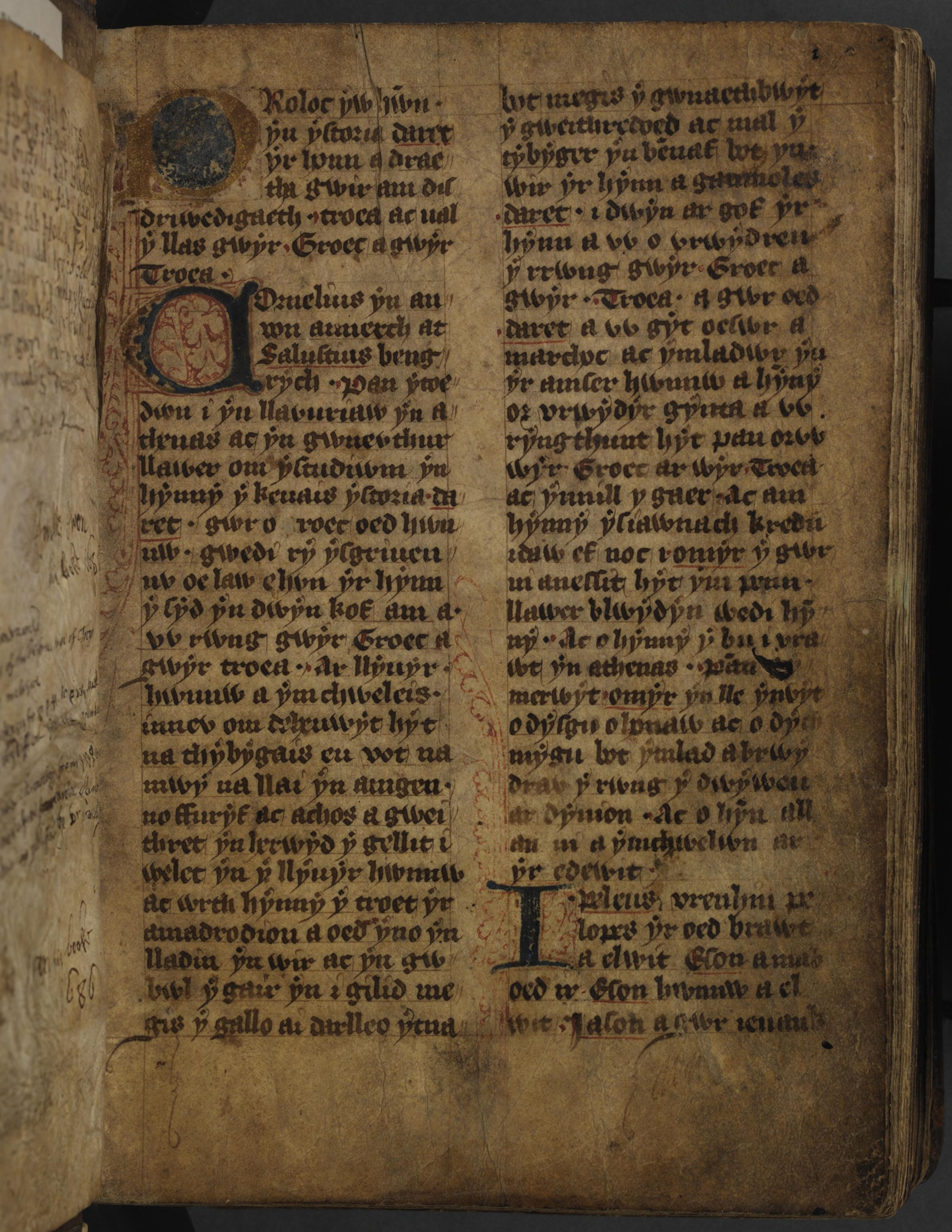
Incipit page of the Black Book of Basingwerk

The Black Book of Basingwerk (Welsh: Llyfr Du Basing) is an illuminated manuscript in the National Library of Wales (NLW MS 7006D) containing, among other texts, a Welsh translation of Geoffrey of Monmouth's Historia Regum Britanniae. It is mostly the work of the Welsh poet and scribe Gutun Owain (fl. 1460–1500). The illumination is limited to three decorated initials, and two marginal drawings now barely visible to the naked eye.

== See also ==
- The Form of Preaching, 14th-century-style book or manual about a preaching style
