= South Britain =

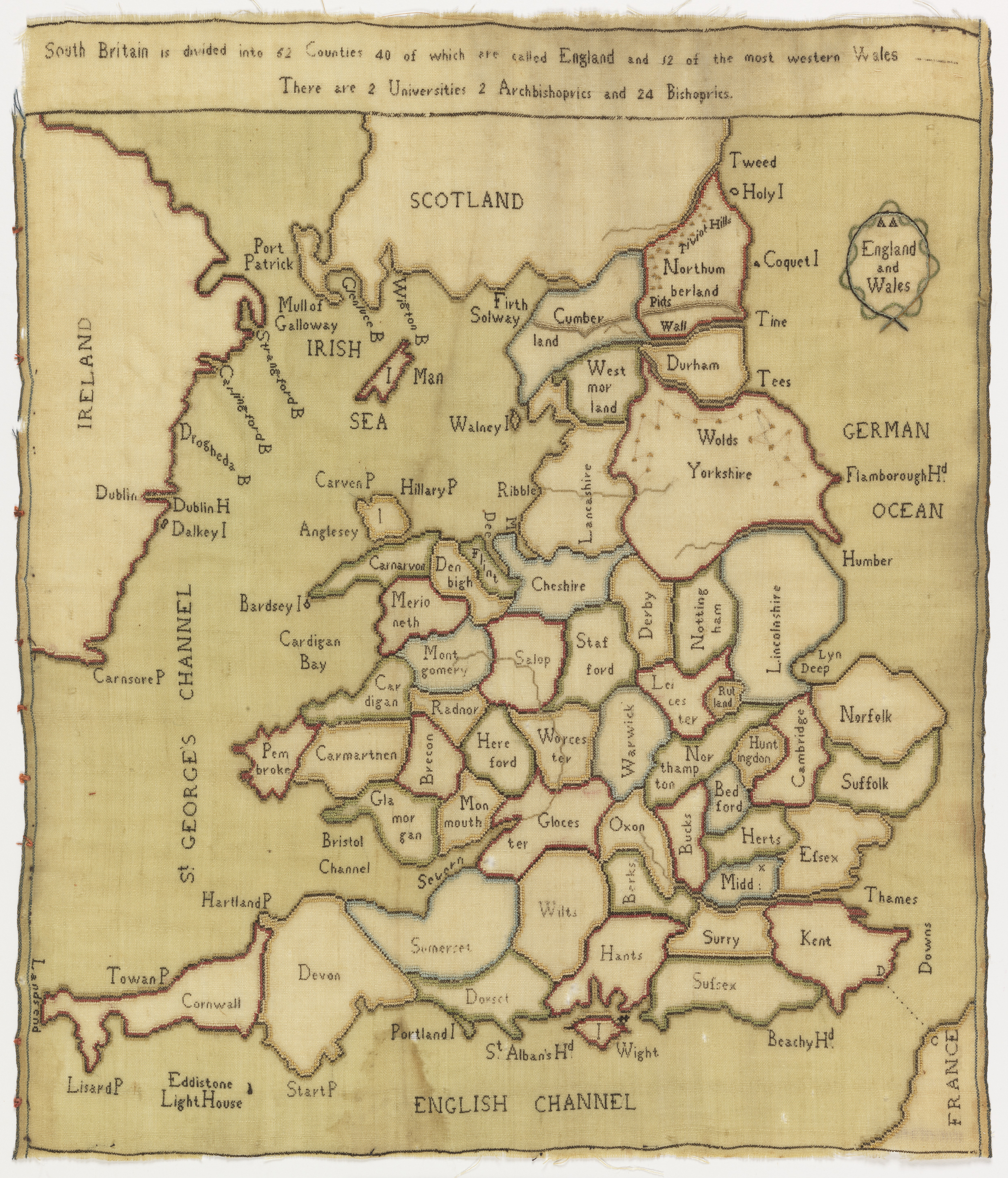
Sampler of c. 1790, which states that "South Britain is divided into 52 counties 40 of which are called England and 12 of the most western Wales."

South Britain is a term which was occasionally used in the 17th and 18th centuries, for England and Wales in relation to their position in the southern half of the island of Great Britain. It was used mainly by Scottish writers, in apposition to the term "North Britain", which generally referred to Scotland.

== Origins ==
Early uses of the designation have been noted after the 1603 Union of the Crowns of the Kingdoms of England and Scotland. King James VI & I used the terms "South Britain" and "North Britain" for England (and, implicitly, Wales) and Scotland respectively, most famously in his Proclamation of 1606 (here) establishing the first Union Flag, where Scotland and England are not otherwise named:

"Whereas some difference has a risen between our Subjects of South and North Britain, Travelling by Sea, about the bearing of their flags"

This usage was repeated in Charles I's Proclamation of 1634 on the use of the flag, though adding England and Scotland too for explanation:

"Our further will and pleasure is, that all the other Ships of Our Subjects of England or South Britain bearing flags shall from henceforth carry the Red Cross, commonly called S. George’s Cross, as of old time hath been used; And also that all other ships of Our Subjects of Scotland or North Britain shall henceforth carry the White Cross commonly called S. Andrews Cross"

== See also ==
- North–South divide in the United Kingdom
