= Trinovantum =

Legendary name for London

Trinovantum is the name in medieval British legend that was given to London, according to Geoffrey of Monmouth's Historia Regum Britanniae, when it was founded by the exiled Trojan Brutus, who called it Troia Nova ("New Troy"), which was gradually corrupted to Trinovantum. The legend says that it was later rebuilt by King Lud, who named it Caer Lud ("Lud's Fort") after himself and that the name became corrupted to Kaer Llundain and finally London. The legend is part of the Matter of Britain.

The name Trinovantum derives from the Iron Age tribe of the Trinovantes, who lived in Essex, Suffolk and part of Greater London and are mentioned by Julius Caesar in his account of his expeditions to Britain in 55 and 54 BC. In a later account of those expeditions by Orosius, they are referred to as civitas Trinovantum, "the nation of the Trinovantes", with Trinovantum in this case being in the genitive plural. However, as civitas can also mean "city" and Latin neuter nouns often end in -um in the nominative singular, this phrase was misinterpreted by Geoffrey or his sources as "the city Trinovantum".

In Roman times, the city was known by the name Londinium, which appears to be cognate with Llundain and London.
