= Belinus =

Legendary British king

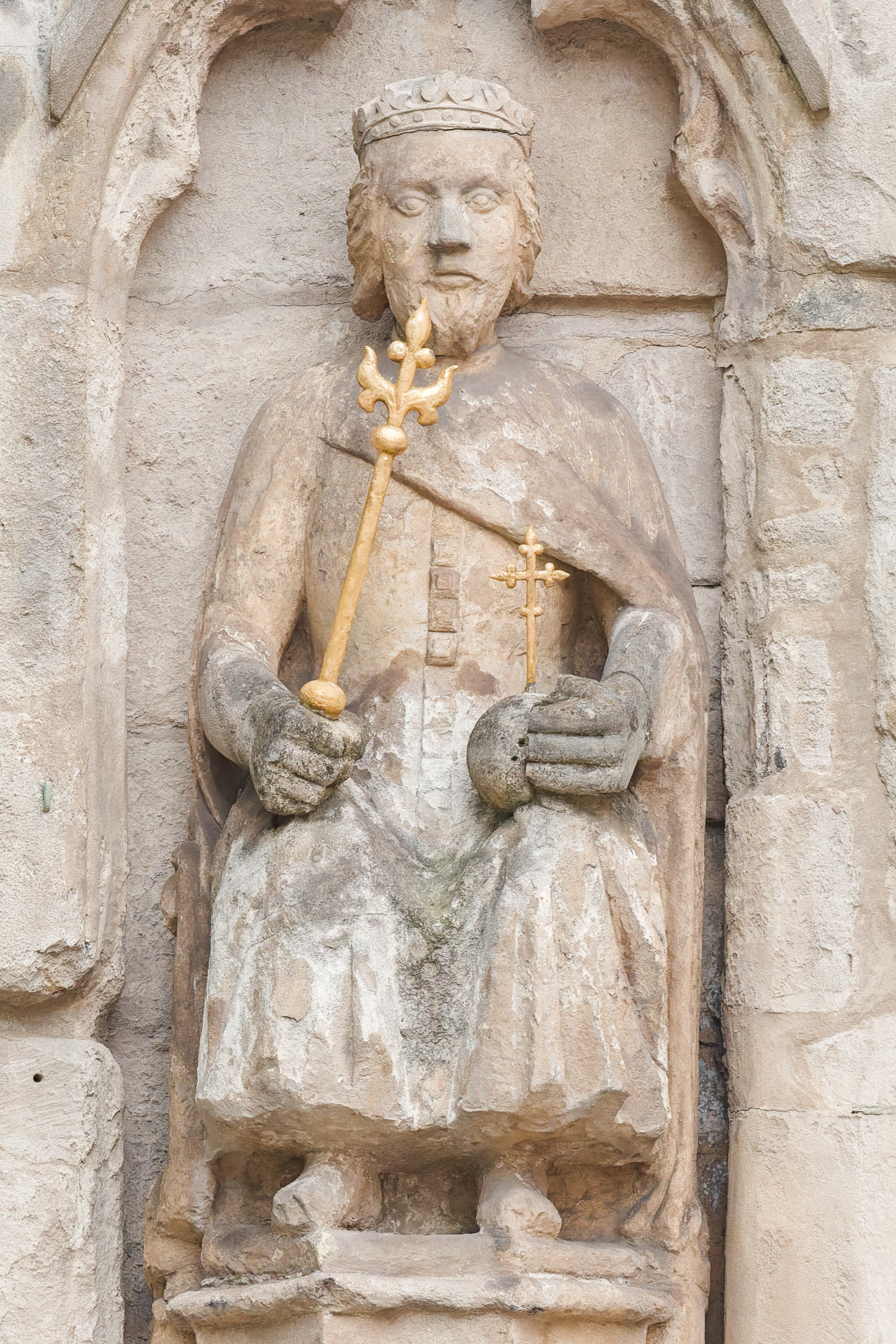
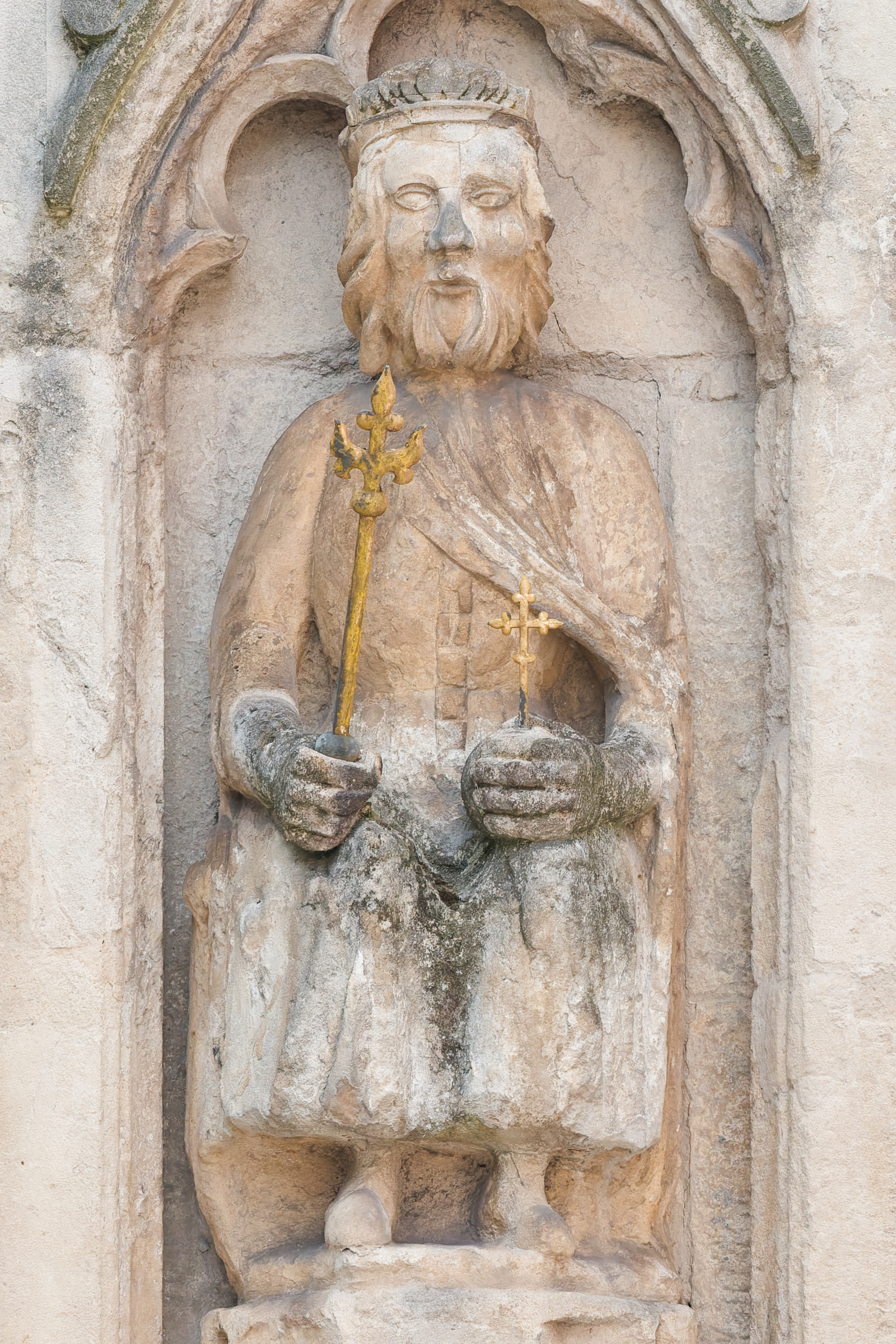
- Niches with figures of Belinus and Brennius on the Church of St John the Baptist, Bristol

King of Southern Britain
- Reign: c. 390 BC
- Predecessor: Dyfnwal Moelmud
- Successor: Gurguit Barbtruc

King of Northern Britain
- Predecessor: Brennius
- Successor: Gurguit Barbtruc
- Issue: Gurguit Barbtruc
- Father: Dyfnwal Moelmud

Belinus was a legendary king of the Britons, as recounted by Geoffrey of Monmouth. He was the son of Dunvallo Molmutius and brother of Brennius and came to power in 390 BC. He was probably named after the ancient god Belenus.

== Earning the crown ==
In an effort to win the crown of Britain, Brennius and Belinus waged war between each other to determine who should succeed their father. Many battles were fought between the two brothers until a time came when their friends intervened and a compromise was decided upon. Belinus became the King of the Britons with Brennius as king of the north.

Five years later, Brennius wed the daughter of the King of Norway without consulting Belinus. Belinus invaded Northumbria and seized Brennius's land. The King of Denmark was in love with Brennius's new wife and had pursued him and captured her ship. A storm drove the Danish king to land in Britain by accident. Belinus imprisoned them and awaited the return of his brother. Brennius landed in Albany and demanded the return of all his lands and his wife. If not, he swore he would kill Belinus if they ever met in battle.

Belinus called to arms all of Britain against Brennius and the two armies met in the forests of Calaterium. The battle was fought ruthlessly and Belinus defeated the army of Brennius. Brennius fled to Gaul and Belinus became king over all the Britons. He emphasized the Molmutine Laws of his father and ruled justly.

Eventually, Brennius invaded Britain behind a massive Gallic army and met Belinus on the battlefield once again. Their mother, however, convinced Brennius to make peace, and the two brothers ruled their two realms in harmony with each other.

== Invader of Gaul, Italy and Germany ==
Attributed arms of Belinus from the Book of Baglan

Following their unification, Belinus and Brennius merged their armies into one great one and invaded Gaul. According to the story, after a year of warfare, the joint army managed to submit all the Frankish kingdoms in Gaul to their authority. Now with an even greater army, Belinus led his great army to the Italian Peninsula and threatened to invade Rome. Outside Rome the two consuls, Gabias and Porsenna, sued for peace and offered wealth, tribute, and hostages as a sign of their submission. Belinus and Brennius accepted and took their great army to Germany. Soon after this movement north, Rome broke the treaty and marched north and Brennius went to fight the Romans while Belinus remained at war with the Germans (who were being helped by various other Italian troops).

After Brennius had left, the Italian troops who were reinforcing the Germans abandoned the Germans in a vain attempt to unite with the Roman soldiers on the other side of Belinus's army. Belinus learned of this and moved his army to a valley through which the Italians had to pass. In the morning, Belinus attacked the Italians, who were not in armour and were unprepared for battle at that point in time. All day the Britons pursued the Italians until it was night.

Belinus decided to join forces with his brother, who was besieging Rome. The Romans defended the city for many days and were successful in repelling the invaders. At last, Belinus decided to hang the hostages they were given in the treaty, but it only enraged the Romans more. Finally, the two consuls put on armour and joined the men defending the city. They pushed the invaders back but Belinus was able to reform the lines and stop the attacks. Belinus continued forward until the walls were breached and the Britons invaded the city. Belinus left Brennius in Rome and returned to Britain.

== Later years ==
He ruled in peace, building many new cities and restoring many decaying ones. Most important of the cities he founded was Kaerusc, which would be renamed Caerleon or the City of Legions when the Romans occupied Britain. (This was the first reference to Caerleon-upon-Usk in Geoffrey's history.) Belinus continued using many of his father's laws and enacted a number of his own. Britain became more wealthy than ever before in this time.

When Belinus finally died, he was cremated and placed on top of a great tower he had created; he was succeeded by his son Gurguit Barbtruc.

== Comments on historicity ==
Rome was indeed captured by one Brennus following the Battle of the Allia on 18 July 390 BC. Gabias and Porsenna are not mentioned in any Roman sources. The latter is a namesake of Lars Porsena, a King of the Etruscans who is believed to have fought against the recently founded Roman Republic around 500 BC.

Legendary titles
Preceded by Dunvallo Molmutius	King of South Britain	Succeeded by Gurguit Barbtruc
Preceded by Brennius	King of North Britain	Succeeded by Gurguit Barbtruc
