= Brennius =

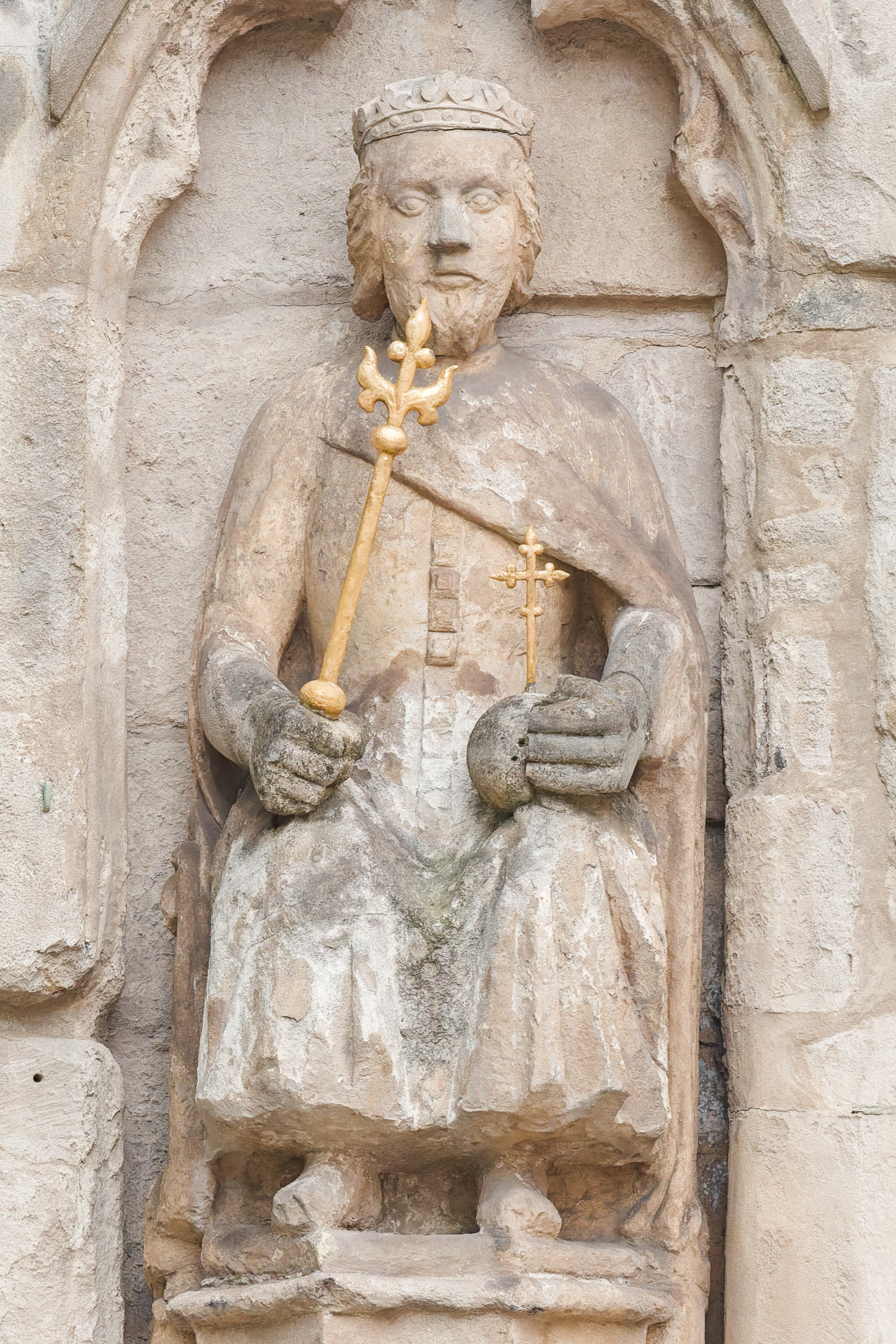
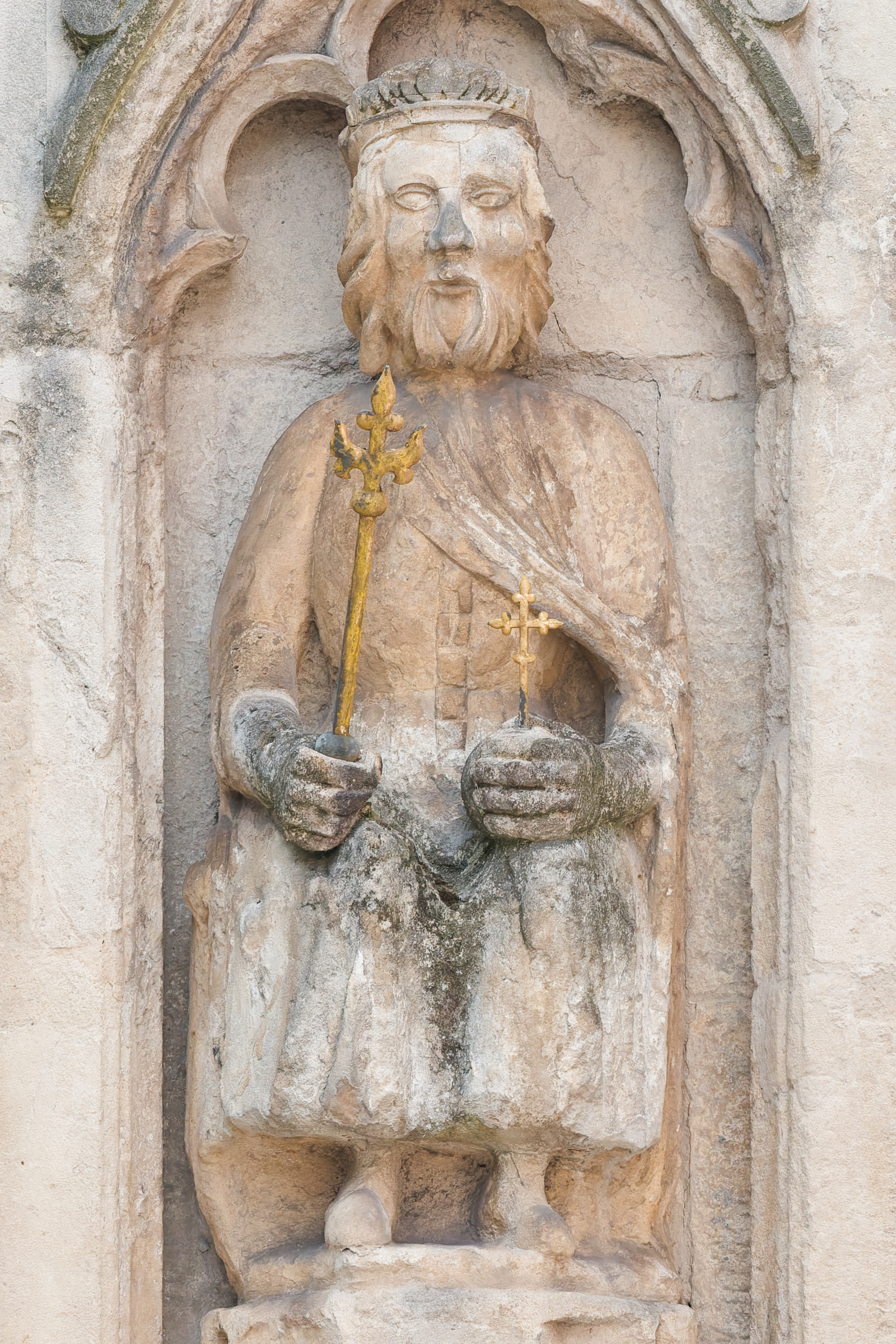
- Niches with figures of Brennius and Belinus on the Church of St John the Baptist, Bristol

King of Northern Britain
- Reign: c. 390 BC
- Predecessor: Dyfnwal Moelmud
- Successor: Belinus
- Father: Dyfnwal Moelmud

Brennius was a legendary king of Northumbria, Scotland, and the Allobroges, as recounted in Geoffrey of Monmouth's Historia Regum Britanniae (c. 1136). He was the son of Dunvallo Molmutius and brother of Belinus, probably based upon one or both of the historical Brenni. He came to power in 390 BC.

== Historia Regum Britanniae ==
=== Claimant to the throne of Britain ===
In an effort to win the crown of Britain, Brennius and Belinus waged war between each other to determine who should succeed their father. Many battles were fought between the two brothers until a time came when their friends intervened and a compromise was decided upon. Belinus became the King of the Britons with Brennius as King of Northumbria and Scotland.

Five years later, Brennius wed the daughter of the King of Norway without consulting Belinus. Belinus invaded Northumbria and seized Brennius's land. Brennius heard of this violation and gathered a large Norwegian army together to sail for Britain. On the way, a fleet of ships under the King of Denmark attacked because the king wanted Brennius's wife for himself. They fought in the open ocean and the two sides dispersed. The King of Denmark managed to capture the wife of Brennius but he then got lost and landed on Britain. Belinus captured the king and his brother's wife. Brennius landed in Albany and demanded the return of all his lands and his wife. If not, he swore he would kill Belinus if they ever met in battle.

Belinus called to arms all of Britain against Brennius and the two armies met in the forests of Calaterium. The battle was fought ruthlessly and Belinus defeated the army of Brennius. Brennius fled to Gaul and Belinus became king over all the Britons.

=== Duke of the Allobroges ===
While in Gaul, Brennius travelled from king to king explaining his situation. All denied him help or protection until the Duke of the Allobroges, Segnius, befriended him. He became highly influential in the duke's ranks and was given the duke's daughter in marriage. The duke and all his men pledged to Brennius that if the duke produced no male heirs, Brennius would succeed him as leader of the Allobroges. The duke died within the year and Brennius became duke. He divided the treasures of the duke among the people and kept an open court to them all.

Soon after becoming duke, Brennius gathered together another army and made right of passage treaties with all the Gauls. Eventually, he invaded Britain with his army and met Belinus on the battlefield. Their mother, however, convinced Brennius to make peace, and the two brothers ruled their two realms in harmony with each other.

=== Conqueror of Rome ===
Following their unification, Belinus and Brennius merged their armies into one great one and invaded Gaul. After a year of warfare, the joint army managed to subject all the Frankish kingdoms in Gaul to their authority. Now with an even greater army, Belinus lead his great army to Italy and threatened to invade Rome. Outside Rome, the two consuls, Gabias and Porsenna, sued for peace and offered wealth, tribute, and hostages as a sign of their submission. Belinus and Brennius accepted and took their great army to Germany. Soon after this movement north, Rome broke the treaty and marched north, and Brennius went to fight the Romans while Belinus remained at war with the Germans (who were being helped by various other Italian troops).

Brennius traveled south and besieged Rome for three days until his brother came to his aid in the invasion. The Romans defended the city for many days and were successful in repelling the invaders. Finally, the two consuls put on armour and joined the men defending the city. They pushed the invaders back but Belinus was able to reform the lines and stop the attacks. Brennius and Belinus continued forward until the walls were breached and the Britons and Gauls invaded the city.

Brennius stayed in Rome and ruled ruthlessly for the rest of his days.

=== Comments on historicity ===
Rome was indeed captured by Brennus, a Gaulish chieftain, following the Battle of the Allia on 18 July 390 BC. Gabias and Porsenna are not mentioned in any Roman sources. The later is a namesake of Lars Porsena, a King of the Etruscan civilization who is believed to have fought against the recently founded Roman Republic in the decade of the 500s BC.

== Later tradition ==
Brennius was mentioned by Thomas Howard, 3rd Duke of Norfolk, in 1530, when the duke, while arguing in favor of the claims of the House of Tudor claims to imperial status, told Holy Roman Imperial ambassador Eustace Chapuys that Brennius had founded Bristol and conquered Rome.

His ghost appears (as Brennus) in the Jacobean play Fuimus Troes (c. 1607–1625) where he inspires the Britons' defence against Julius Caesar's invasion.

Legendary titles
Preceded by Dunvallo Molmutius	King of North Britain	Succeeded by Belinus
