= Sanctuary =

Sacred place

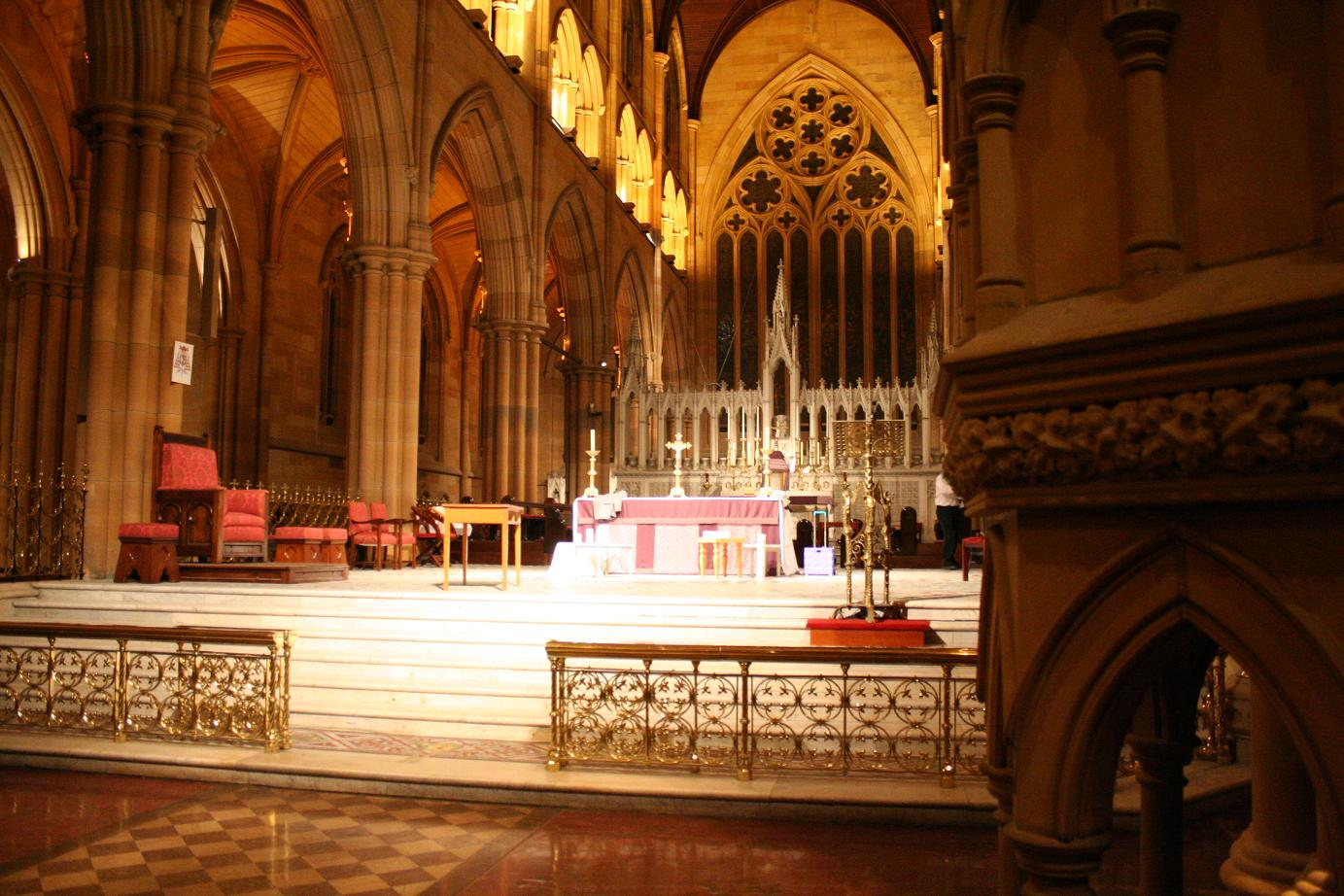
The sanctuary at St. Mary's Cathedral, Sydney

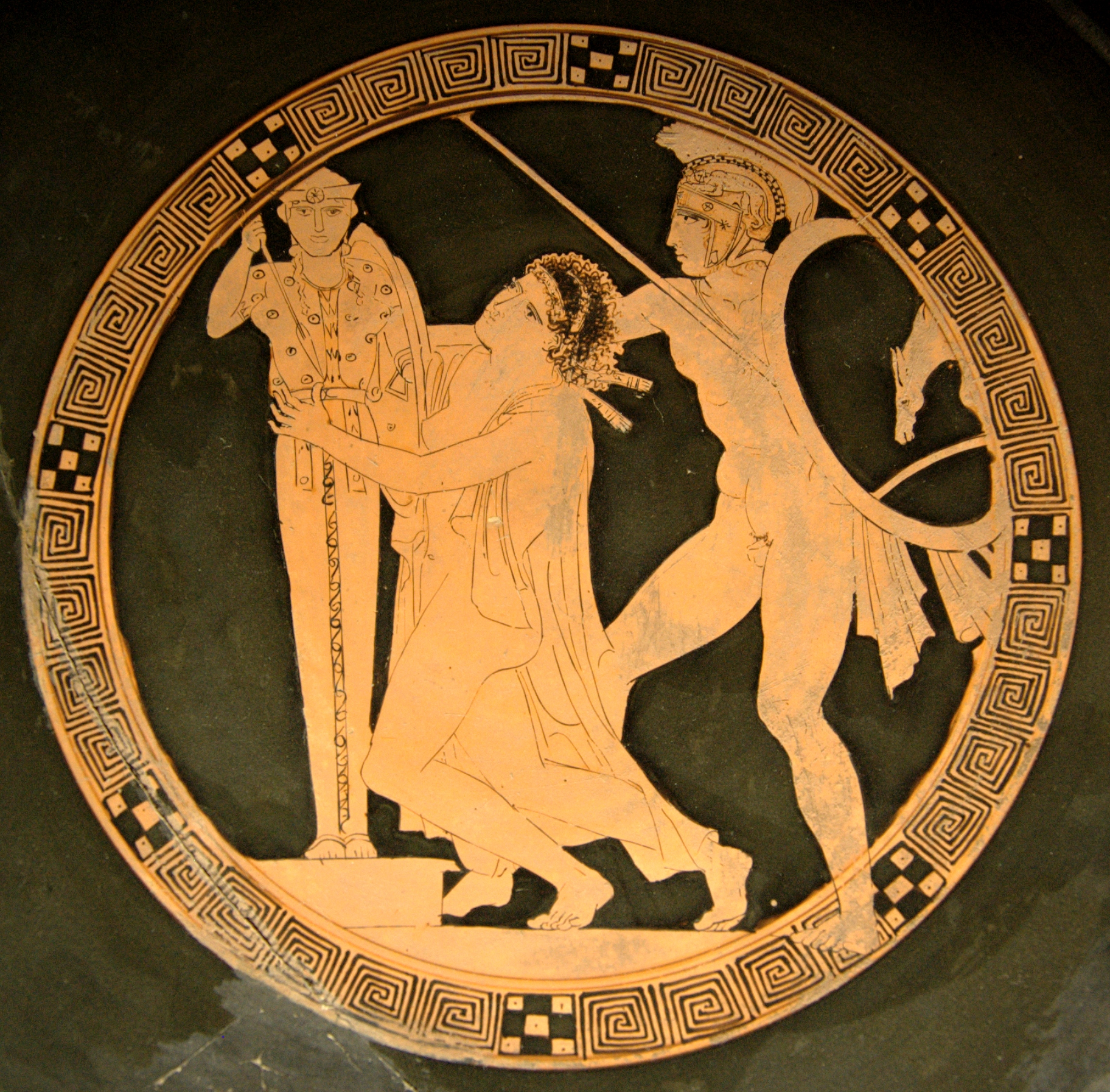
Ajax the Younger violates Cassandra's sanctuary at the Palladium: tondo of an Attic cup, ca. 440–430 BCE

A sanctuary, in its original meaning, is a sacred place, such as a shrine, protected by ecclesiastical immunity. By the use of such places as a haven, by extension the term has come to be used for any place of safety. This secondary use can be categorized into human sanctuary, a safe place for people, such as a political sanctuary; and non-human sanctuary, such as an animal or plant sanctuary.

== Religious sanctuary ==
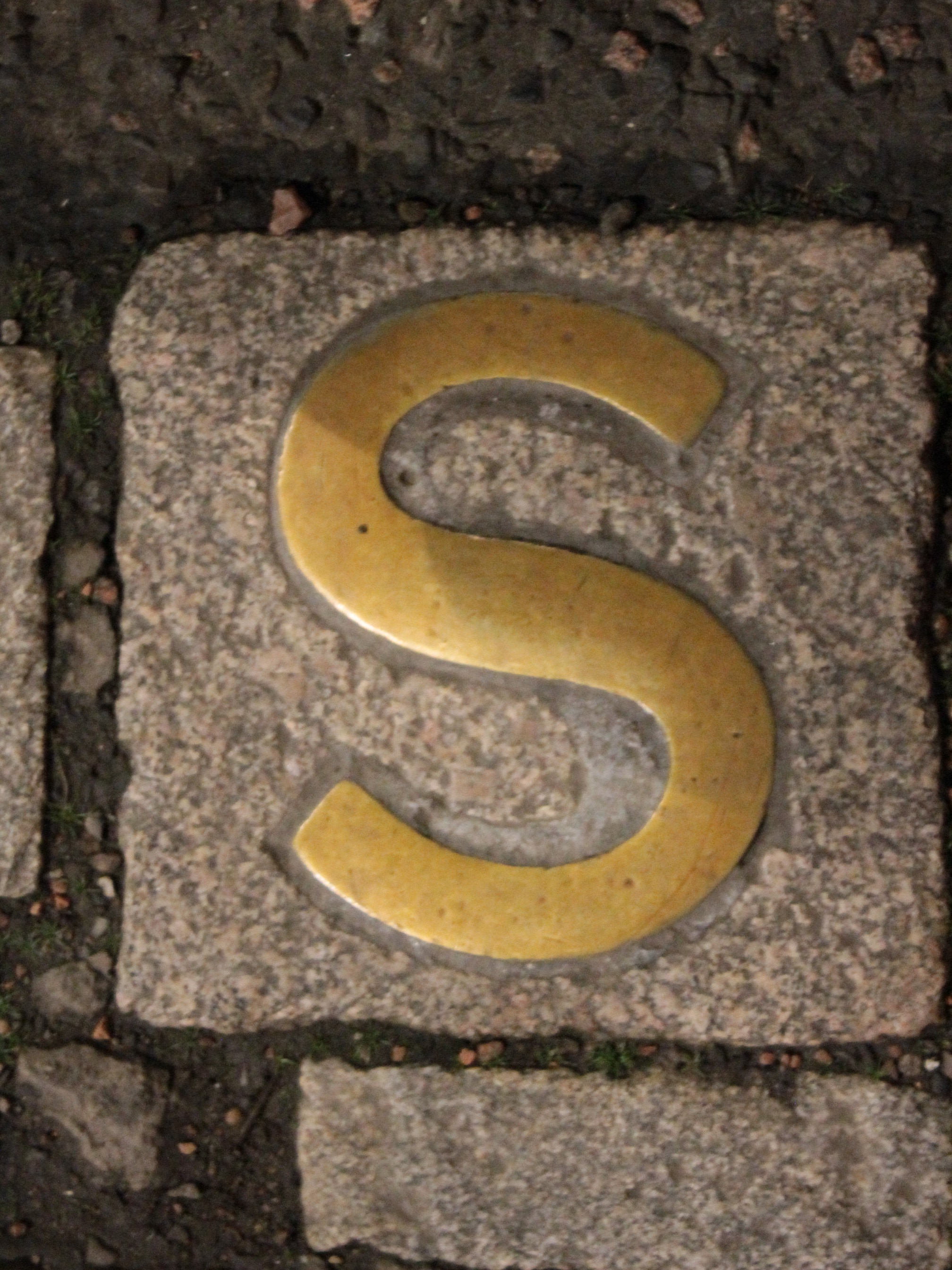
Sanctuary marker (S) at Holyrood Abbey, Royal Mile, Edinburgh

Sanctuary is a word derived from the Latin sanctuarium, which is, like most words ending in -arium, a container for keeping something in—in this case holy things or perhaps cherished people (sanctae/sancti). The meaning was extended to places of holiness or safety. Its origin is the principle of independence and immunity of religious orders from "temporal" powers.

In many religious buildings sanctuary has a specific meaning, covering part of the interior.

=== In Christian churches ===
In many Western Christian traditions including Roman Catholic, Evangelical-Lutheran, and Anglican churches, the area around the altar is called the chancel or sanctuary. The architectural term chancel is synonymous with the sanctuary, and either term may be used. It is considered holy because of the belief in the physical presence of God in the Eucharist, both during the Mass and for those Christian denominations that practice eucharistic reservation, in the church tabernacle at other times. A chancel lamp indicates the presence of God in the church in the Roman Catholic and Evangelical-Lutheran traditions.

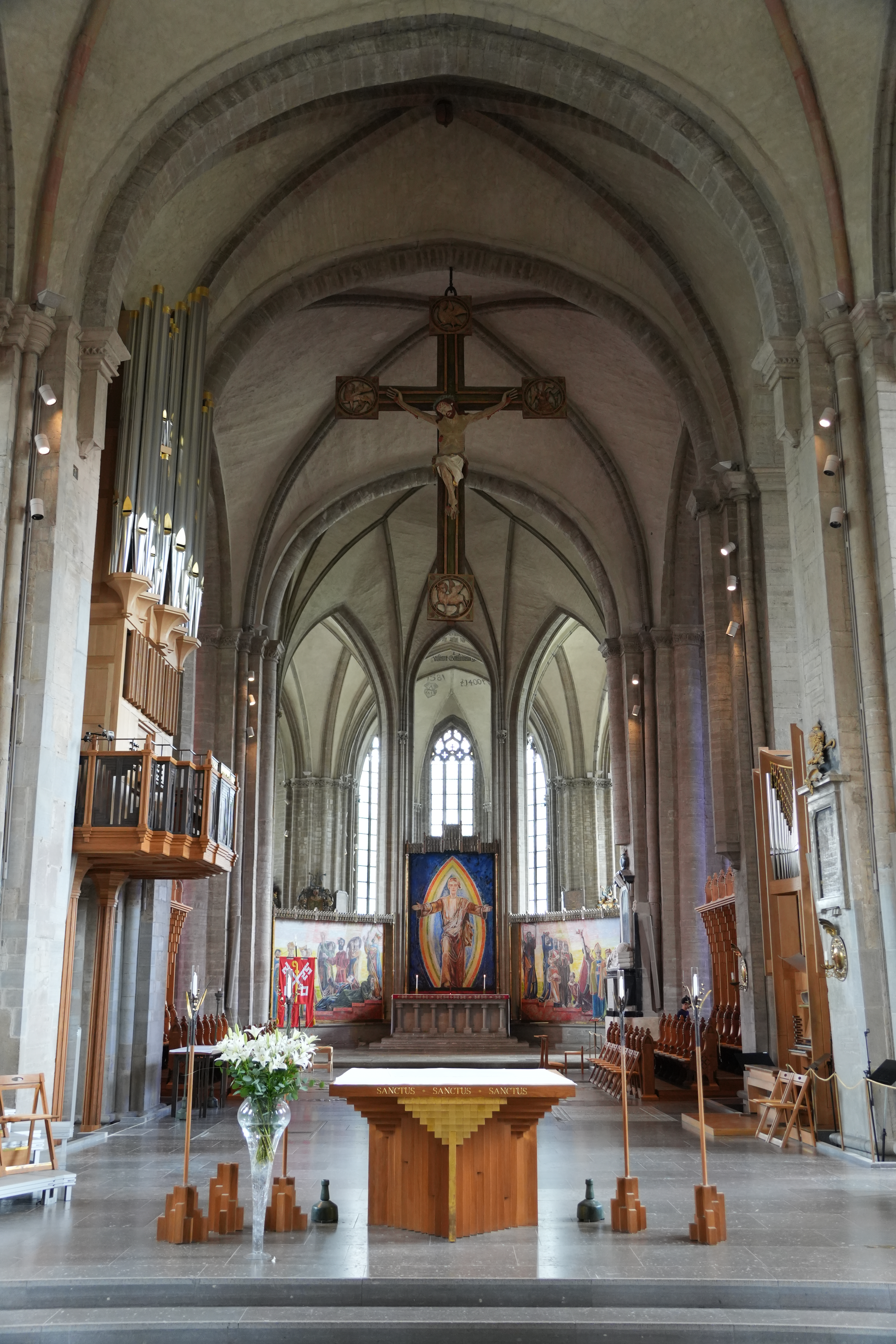
The chancel (sanctuary) of Linköping Cathedral (Evangelical-Lutheran) in Sweden

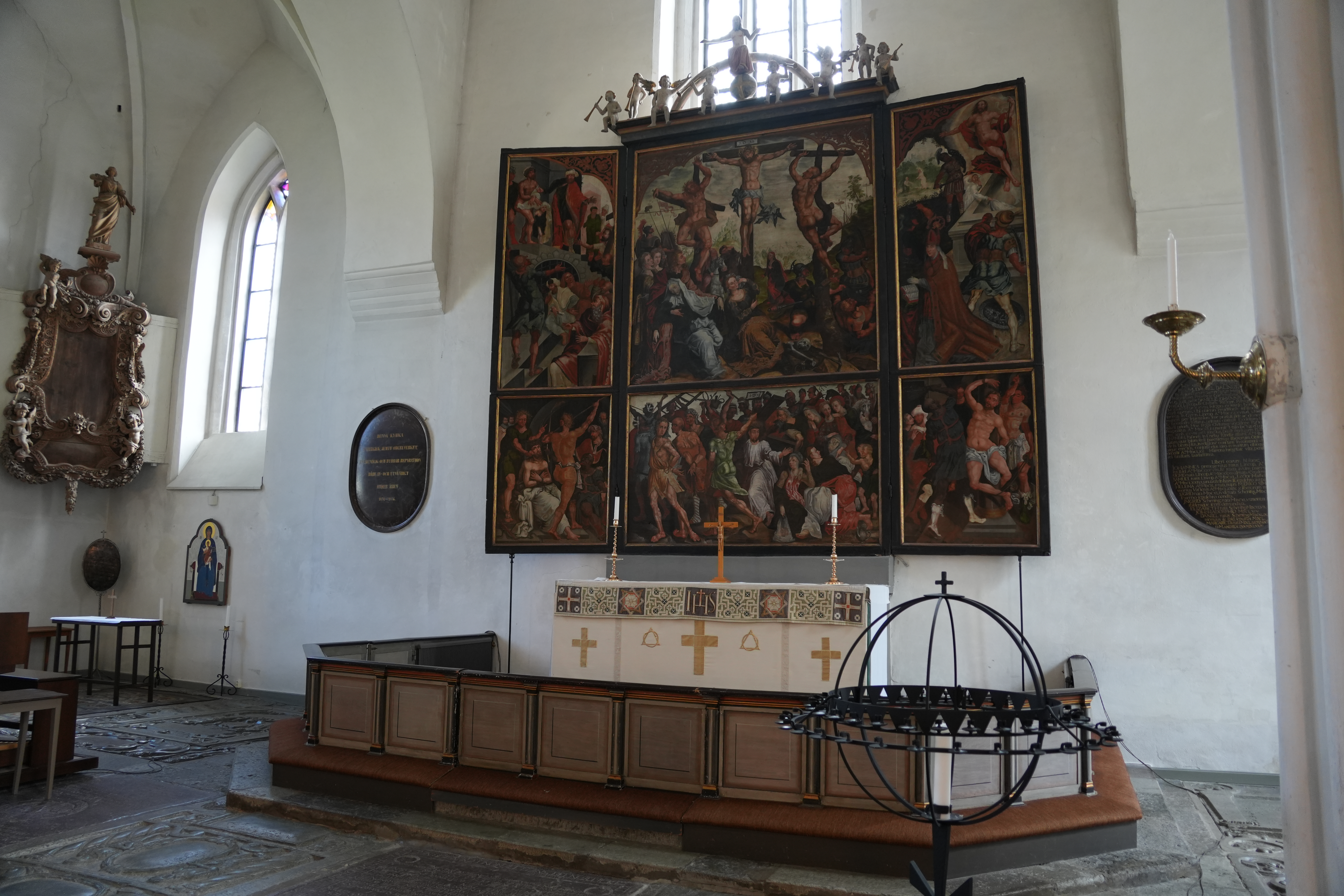
The chancel of the Evangelical Lutheran Church of our Lady, with the church's Lady chapel visible, in Skänninge, Sweden

In many Western Christian traditions, altar rails and sometimes steps would demarcate the chancel (sanctuary) from the rest of the building. In the Eastern Orthodox Church, Eastern Lutheran Churches, Eastern Catholic Churches of Syro-Malabar Church, Byzantine rite and Coptic Orthodox Churches, the sanctuary is separated from the nave (where worshippers pray) by an iconostasis, literally a wall of icons, with three doors in it. In other Oriental Orthodox traditions, a sanctuary curtain is used.

In Methodist and Baptist churches, the term sanctuary denotes the entire worship space while the term chancel refers only to the area around the communion table.

=== In Jewish temples and synagogues ===
The terminology that applies the word sanctuary to the area around the altar does not apply to Christian churches alone: King Solomon's temple, built in about 950 BC, had a sanctuary ("Holy of Holies") where the Ark of the Covenant was, and the term applies to the corresponding part of any house of worship. In most modern synagogues, the main room for prayer is known as the sanctuary, to contrast it with smaller rooms dedicated to various other services and functions. In synagogues there is a raised bimah in the sanctuary, from which services are conducted, which is where the ark holding the Torah may reside; some synagogues, however, have a separate bimah and ark-platform.

=== Sanctuary as a sacred place ===
In Europe, Christian churches were sometimes built on land considered to be a particularly holy spot. Often these there were legends associated with these locations regarding miracles or martyrdom believed to have taken place or where a holy person was buried. Examples are St. Peter's Basilica in Rome and St. Albans Cathedral in England, which commemorate the martyrdom of Saint Peter (the first Pope) and Saint Alban (the first Christian martyr in Britain), respectively. Such locations were also often the sites of religious importance to the community before Christianity arrived.

The place and the church built there were considered to have been sanctified (made holy) by what happened there. In modern times, the Catholic Church has continued this practice by placing in the altar of each church, when it is consecrated for use, a box (the sepulcrum) containing relics of one or more saints, usually martyrs. This relic box is removed when the church is deconsecrated as a holy space. In the Eastern Orthodox Church, the antimension on the altar serves a similar function. It is a cloth icon of Christ's body taken down from the cross, and typically has the relics of a saint sewn into it. In addition, it is signed by the parish's bishop, and represents his authorization and blessing for the Eucharist to be celebrated on that altar.

== Human sanctuary ==
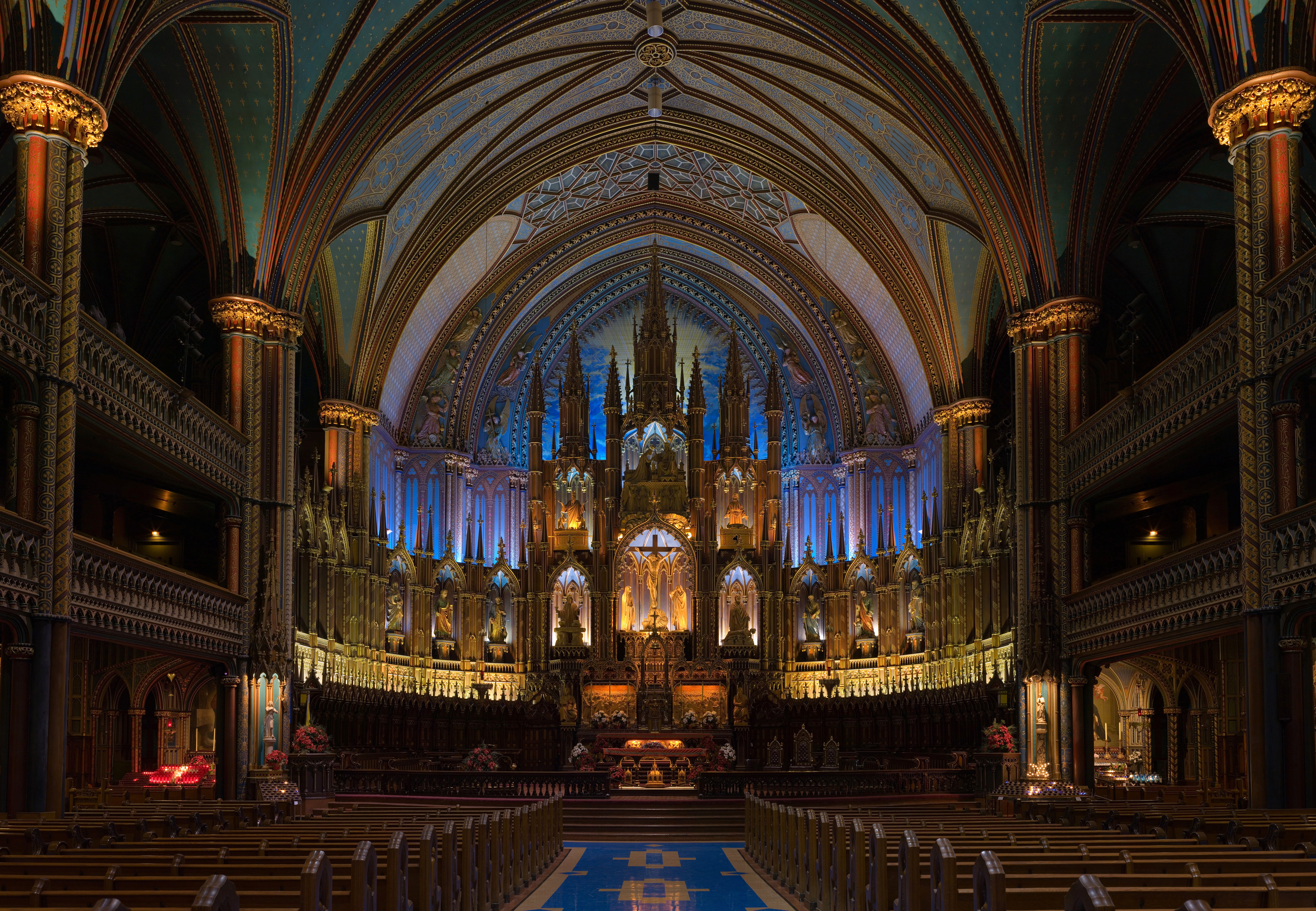
Sanctuary at the Notre-Dame Basilica of Montreal

=== Traditions of sanctuary ===
Although the word "sanctuary" is often traced back only as far as the Greek and Roman empires, the concept itself has likely been part of human cultures for thousands of years. The idea that persecuted persons should be given a place of refuge is ancient, perhaps even primordial, deriving itself from basic features of human altruism. In studying the concept across many cultures and times, anthropologists have found sanctuary to be a highly universal notion, one which appears in almost all major religious traditions and in a variety of diverse geographies. "Cities of refuge" as described by the Book of Numbers and Deuteronomy in the Old Testament, as well as the Bedouin idea of nazaala, or the "taking of refuge", indicate a strong tradition of sanctuary in the Middle East and Northern Africa. In the Americas, many native tribes shared similar practices, particularly in the face of invading European powers. Despite tensions between groups, many tribes still offered and received sanctuary, taking in those who had fled their tribal lands or feared persecution by the Spanish, English, and French.

=== Legal sanctuary ===
Some (but not all) temples offered sanctuary to criminals or runaway slaves. When referring to prosecution of crimes, sanctuary can mean one of the following:

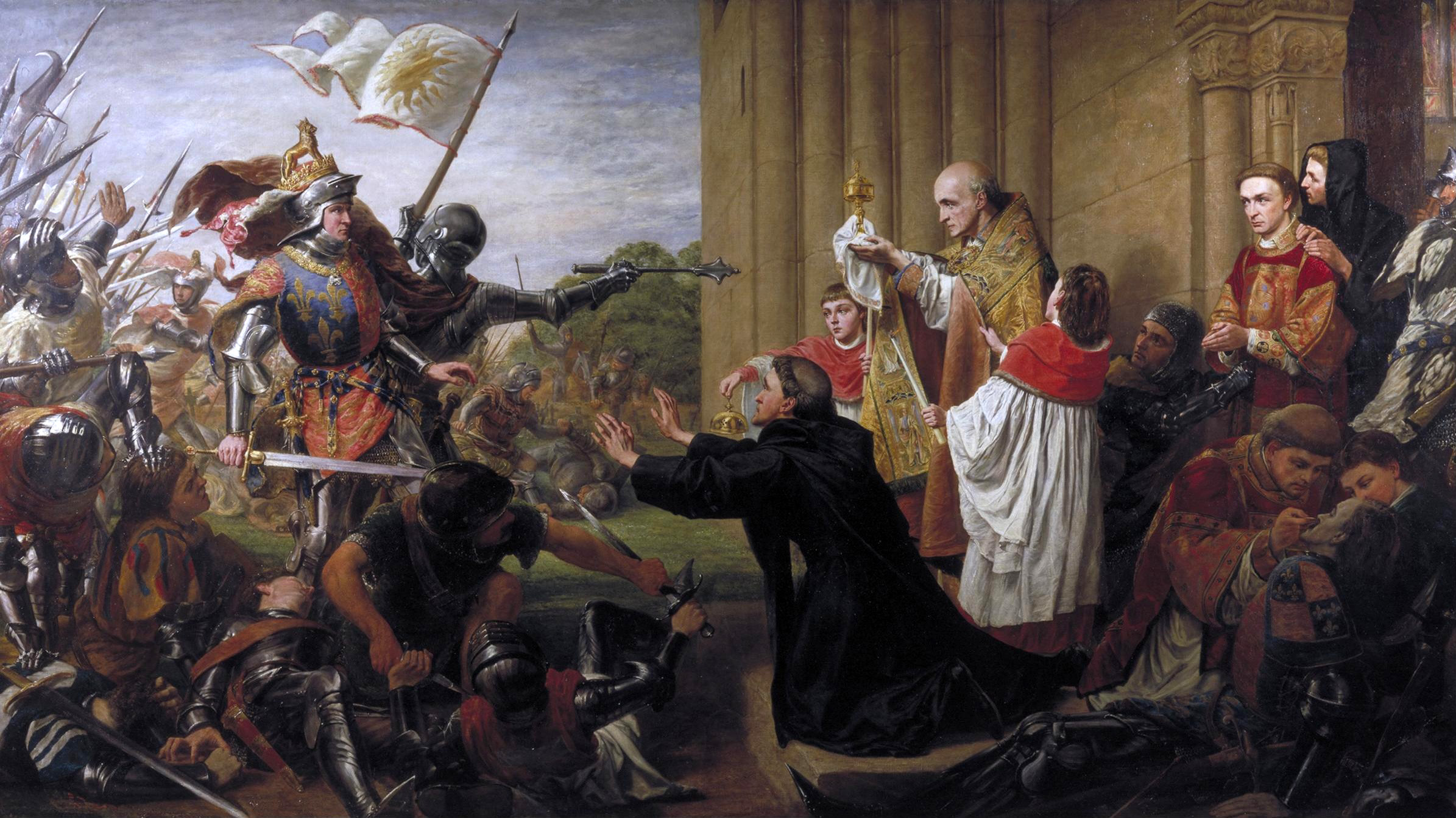
Sanctuary by Richard Burchett. The Church as a place of refuge during the Wars of the Roses.

==== Church sanctuary ====
With respect to church archtitecture, the term "sanctuary" is variously used to denote the worship space of a church, broadly speaking, or more specifically used as a synonym of the chancel—which contains the main or "high" altar.

In a sacred place such as a church, fugitives were formerly immune from arrest (this was recognized by English law from the fourth to the seventeenth century). While the practice of churches offering sanctuary is still observed in the modern era, it no longer has any legal effect and is respected solely for the sake of tradition.

==== Political sanctuary ====
Immunity to arrest afforded by a sovereign authority. The United Nations has expanded the definition of "political" to include race, nationality, religion, political opinions and membership or participation in any particular social group or social activities. People seeking political sanctuary typically do so by asking a sovereign authority for asylum.

==== Right of asylum ====
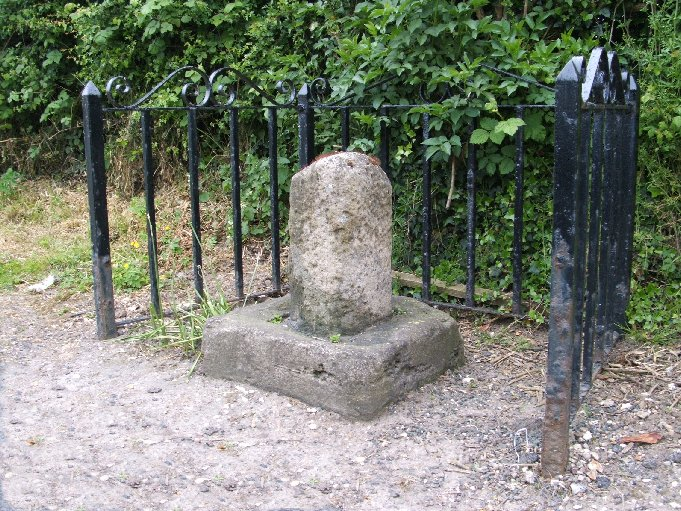
Remains of one of four medieval stone boundary markers for the sanctuary of Saint John of Beverley in the East Riding of Yorkshire

Many ancient peoples recognized a religious right of asylum, protecting those accused of a crime from legal action and from exile to some extent. This principle was adopted by the early Christian church, and various rules developed for what the person had to do to qualify for protection and just how much protection it was.

Based on an account by Gregory of Tours in late 6th century France, sanctuary was already practiced, but was not all the time respected. In England, King Æthelberht made the first laws regulating sanctuary in about AD 600, though Geoffrey of Monmouth in his Historia Regum Britanniae (c. 1136) says that the legendary pre-Saxon king Dunvallo Molmutius (4th/5th century BC) enacted sanctuary laws in the Molmutine Laws as recorded by Gildas (c. 500–570). By Norman times, there had come to be two kinds of the sanctuary: churches licensed by the king had a broader version, while other churches had a lower level. The medieval system of asylum was abolished entirely in England by James I in 1623.

==== Political asylum ====
During the Wars of the Roses of the 15th century when the Lancastrians or Yorkists would suddenly gain the upper hand by winning a battle, some adherents of the losing side might find themselves surrounded by adherents of the winning side and unable to return to their own side, so they would rush to sanctuary at the nearest church until it was safe to leave it. A prime example is Queen Elizabeth Woodville, consort of Edward IV of England.

In 1470, when the Lancastrians briefly restored Henry VI to the throne, Edward's queen was living in London with several young daughters. She moved with them into Westminster Abbey for sanctuary, living there in royal comfort until Edward was restored to the throne in 1471 and giving birth to their first son Edward during that time. When King Edward IV died in 1483, Elizabeth (who was highly unpopular with even the Yorkists and probably did need protection) took her five daughters and youngest son (Richard, Duke of York; Prince Edward had his own household by then) and again moved into sanctuary at Westminster Abbey. She had all the comforts of home; she brought so much furniture and so many chests that the workmen had to break holes in some of the walls to move everything in fast enough to suit her.

In 1917, during World War I, Russia's Allies made the controversial decision to deny political sanctuary to Tsar Nicholas II and his immediate family when he was overthrown in the February Revolution. As a result in July, 1918, Nicholas and his family were executed while confined to the Ipatiev House in Yekaterenburg.

In 1939, months before World War II began, 937 Jewish refugees from Nazi Germany on board the MS St. Louis met the same fate, first by Cuba—their original destination—and afterwards by the United States and Canada. As a result, 620 of them were forced back to Europe, where many of them died in Nazi concentration camps during the war. This incident was the subject of Gordon Thomas' and Max Morgan-Witts' 1974 novel, Voyage of the Damned and its 1976 movie adaptation.

In 1970, Simonas Kudirka was denied U.S. sanctuary when he attempted to defect from the then-Soviet Union by jumping from his "mother ship", 'Sovetskaya Litva', onto the USCGC Vigilant when it was sailing from New Bedford while Kudirka's ship was anchored at Martha's Vineyard. Kudrika was accused of stealing 3,000 roubles from Sovetskaya Litva's safe and when the U.S. State Department didn't help him, Kudrika was sent back to the Soviet Union, where he was convicted of treason and sentenced to ten years of hard labor. Because Kudirka could claim American citizenship through his mother, he was allowed to return to the United States in 1974. His plight was the subject of Algis Ruksenas' 1973 book Day of Shame: The Truth About The Murderous Happenings Aboard the Cutter Vigilant During the Russian-American Confrontation off Martha's Vineyard and the 1978 TV movie The Defection of Simas Kudirka, starring Alan Arkin.

Ten years later, Ukrainian youth, Walter Polovchak, became a cause célèbre in the 1980s because of his request in 1980 at age 12 to remain in the United States permanently after announcing that he didn't want to return with his parents to what was then Soviet Ukraine, and was the subject of a five-year struggle between U.S. and Soviet courts over his fate, which was decided in his favor in 1985 when Walter turned 18 that October 3 and was no longer a juvenile and thus no longer required to return to the Soviet Union if he didn't want to.

Also in the 1980s, Estonian national and alleged Nazi war criminal, Karl Linnas, was the target of several sanctuary denials outside the United States before he was finally returned in 1987 to the then-USSR to face a highly likely death penalty for alleged war crimes that he was convicted of in 1962 (see Holocaust trials in Soviet Estonia). Linnas died of a heart attack in a Leningrad prison hospital on July 2, 1987, while waiting for a possible retrial in Gorbachev's courts, 25 years after Khrushchev's courts convicted him in absentia.

==== Sanctuary versus asylum ====
The concepts of sanctuary and asylum are defined very similarly at their most basic level. Both terms involve the granting of safety or protection from some type of danger, often implied to be a persecuting, oppressive power. The divergence between these terms stems primarily from their societal associations and legal standing; while asylum understood in its political sense implies legally-binding protection on the part of a state entity, sanctuary often takes the form of moral and ethical activism that calls into question decisions made by the institutions in power.

In many instances, the sanctuary is not incorporated into the law but operated in defiance of it. Efforts to create a sanctuary for the persecuted or oppressed are often undertaken by organizations, religious or otherwise, who work outside of mainstream avenues to ameliorate what they see as deficiencies in the existing policy. Though these attempts to provide sanctuary have no legal standing, they can be effective in catalyzing change at community, local, and even regional levels. Sanctuary can also be integrated into these levels of government through "Sanctuary bills", which designate cities and sometimes states as safe spaces for immigrants deemed illegal by the federal government. These bills work to limit the cooperation of local and regional governments with the national government's efforts to enforce immigration law. In recognition of their progressiveness and boldness in the face of perceived injustice, "Sanctuary bills" are commonly referred to as "activist law".

=== Sanctuary in contemporary society ===
For the last few centuries, it has become less common to invoke sanctuary as a means of protecting persecuted peoples. Yet, the 1980s saw a massive resurgence of cases as part of the U.S.-Central American sanctuary movement. This resurgence was part of a broader anti-war movement that emerged to protest U.S. foreign policy in Central America. The movement grew out of the sanctuary practices of political and religious organizations in both the United States and Central America. It was initially sparked by immigrant rights organizations in well-established Central American communities. These organizations first opposed U.S. foreign policy in Central America and then shifted towards aiding an ever-increasing number of Central Americans refugees. Working in tandem, immigrant rights organizations and churches created many new organizations that provided housing and legal services for newly arrived immigrants. These organizations also advocated for the creation of sanctuary spaces for those fleeing war and oppression in their home countries. By 1987, 440 cities in the United States had been declared "sanctuary cities" open to migrants from civil wars in Central America.

The immigrant-religious organization partnerships of the sanctuary movement remain active, providing essential services to immigrant populations. Particularly notable in recent years is their legal and advocacy work. By providing legal representation to asylum seekers who may not be able to afford it, these organizations give their clients a better chance of winning their respective cases. As of 2008, detained asylum seekers with legal representation were six times more likely to win their cases for asylum, and non-detained asylum seekers with representation were almost three times more likely to win asylum compared with those without it. The pro bono legal services provided by these organizations also work to alleviate stress on an adjudication system that is already overloaded with cases—a 2014 study of the system showed that about 250 asylum officers at any one time are tasked with interviewing an average of 28,000 asylum seekers. These sanctuary-based organizations also engage in larger-scale advocacy work that allows them to reach immigrant populations beyond the communities they work in. According to a study done by the "New Sanctuary Movement" organization, at least 600,000 people in the United States have at least one family member in danger of deportation. Legislative and judicial advocacy work at the regional and even national level allows organizations to support this group of people by influencing policy.

From the 1980s continuing into the 2000s, there also have been instances of immigrant rights organizations and churches providing "sanctuary" for short periods to migrants facing deportation in Germany, France, Belgium, the Netherlands, Norway, Switzerland, Australia and Canada, among other nations. In 2007, Iranian refugee Shahla Valadi was granted asylum in Norway after spending seven years in church sanctuary after the initial denial of asylum. From 1983 to 2003 Canada experienced 36 sanctuary incidents. In 2016, an Icelandic church declared that they would harbor two failed asylum seekers who violated the Dublin Regulation, and police removed them for deportation, as ecclesiastical immunity has no legal standing.

== Other uses ==
When referring to a shelter from danger or hardship, sanctuary can mean one of the following:

Shelter sanctuary
A place offering protection and safety; a shelter, typically used by displaced persons, refugees, and homeless people.
Humanitarian sanctuary
A source of help, relief, or comfort in times of trouble typically used by victims of war and disaster.
Institutional sanctuary
An institution for the care of people, especially those with physical or mental impairments, who require organized supervision or assistance.
Work Sanctuary
A place where an individual can work safely and in a natural environment

The term "sanctuary" has further come to be applied to any space set aside for private use in which others are not supposed to intrude, such as a "man cave".

== Non-human sanctuary ==
=== Animal sanctuary ===
An animal sanctuary is a facility where animals are brought to live and be protected for the rest of their lives. Unlike animal shelters, sanctuaries maintain each animal until its natural death, instead of providing temporary shelter until the animal is placed with individuals or groups.

=== Plant sanctuary ===
Plant sanctuaries are areas set aside to maintain functioning natural ecosystems, to act as refuges for species and to maintain ecological processes that cannot survive in most intensely managed landscapes and seascapes. Protected areas act as benchmarks against which we understand human interactions with the natural world.

== See also ==
- Asylum (antiquity) – Place of refuge in antiquity
- Cities of Refuge – Six Levitical cities in the Kingdoms of Israel and Judah
- Church asylum – Christian congregation that meets for worship
- Elvira Arellano – Mexican-born immigration activist
- Frith – Word for peace
- Hospitality – Relationship between the guest and the host, or the art or practice of being hospitable
  - Hospitality law – Legal or social practice
  - Hospitium – Greco-Roman hospitality concept
  - Proxeny – Voluntary diplomatic position in classical Greece
  - Xenia (Greek) – Ancient Greek concept of hospitality
- Shrine – Dedicated holy or sacred place
- Marian shrine – Marian shrines
