= Serfdom =

Status of peasants under feudalism

Serfdom was a condition of debt bondage. It developed during late antiquity and the Early Middle Ages in Europe and lasted in some countries until the mid-19th century and became the status of many peasants under feudalism, specifically relating to manorialism and similar systems.

Unlike slaves, serfs could not be bought, sold, or traded individually, though they could, depending on the area, be sold together with land. Actual slaves, such as the kholops in Russia, could, by contrast, be traded, abused with no rights over their own bodies, could not leave the land they were bound to, and marry only with their lord's permission. (Note: By the end of the Middle Ages, the kholop had become a serf, rather than a slave.)

Serfs who occupied a plot of land were required to work for the lord of the manor who owned that land. In return, they were entitled to protection, justice, and the right to cultivate certain fields within the manor for their own subsistence. Serfs were often required not only to work on the lord's fields, but in his mines and forests and to labour to maintain roads. The manor formed the basic unit of feudal society, and the lord of the manor, the villeins, and to a certain extent the other classes of serf, were bound legally: by taxation in the case of the former, and economically and socially in the latter.

The decline of serfdom in Western Europe has sometimes been attributed to the widespread plague epidemic of the Black Death, which reached Europe in 1347 and caused massive numbers of fatalities, disrupting society. Conversely, serfdom grew stronger in Central and Eastern Europe, where it had been less common (this phenomenon was known as "second serfdom"). In Eastern Europe, the institution persisted until the mid-19th century. Serfdom in Russia gradually evolved from the usual European form to become de facto slavery, though it continued to be called serfdom; one way or another, reforms were carried out to reduce powers of the landowners. In the Habsburg monarchy, serfdom was abolished by the 1781 Serfdom Patent. Serfdom was abolished in Russia in 1861. Prussia declared serfdom unacceptable in its General State Laws for the Prussian States in 1792 and abolished it in 1807, in the wake of the Prussian Reform Movement. In Finland, Norway, and Sweden, feudalism was never fully established, and serfdom did not exist; in Denmark, serfdom-like institutions did exist in the stavnsbånd, between 1733 and 1788 and its vassal Iceland (the more restrictive vistarband, from 1490 until 1894).

Also in countries outside Europe there have been descriptions of serfdom. James Lee and Cameron Campbell describe the Chinese Qing dynasty (1644–1912) as also maintaining a form of serfdom. Melvyn Goldstein described Tibet as having serfdom until 1959 but this is contested. Bhutan is described as having officially abolished serfdom by 1959.

The United Nations 1956 Supplementary Convention on the Abolition of Slavery prohibits serfdom as a practice similar to slavery.

== History ==
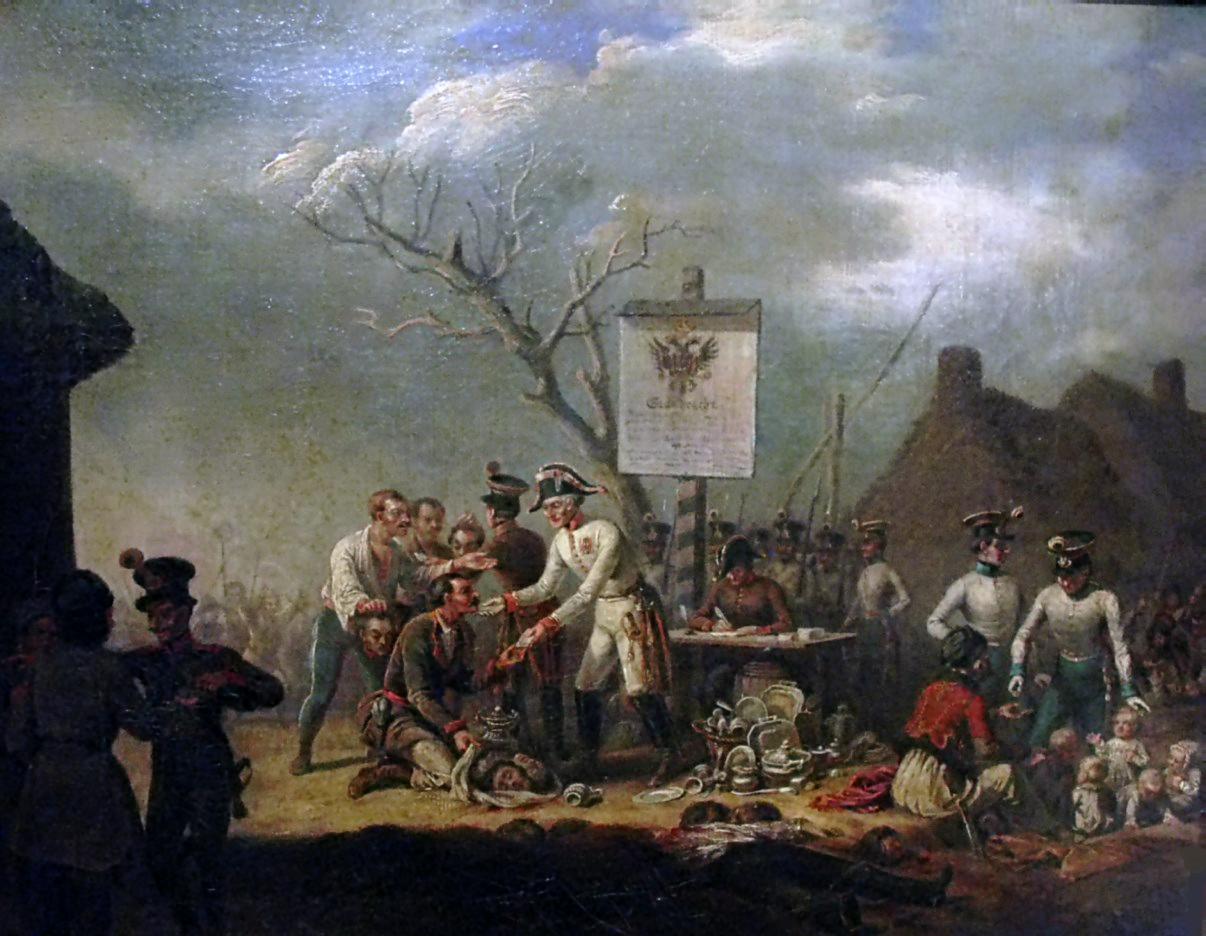
Galician slaughter in 1846 was a revolt against serfdom, directed against manorial property and oppression.

Social institutions similar to serfdom were known in ancient times. The status of the helots in the ancient Greek city-state of Sparta resembled that of the medieval serfs. By the 3rd century AD, the Roman Empire faced a labour shortage. Large Roman landowners increasingly relied on Roman freemen, acting as tenant farmers, instead of slaves to provide labour.

These tenant farmers, eventually known as coloni, saw their condition steadily erode. Because the tax system implemented by Diocletian assessed taxes based on both land and the inhabitants of that land, it became administratively inconvenient for peasants to leave the land where they were counted in the census.

Medieval serfdom really began with the breakup of the Carolingian Empire around the 10th century. During this period, powerful feudal lords encouraged the establishment of serfdom as a source of agricultural labour. Serfdom, indeed, was an institution that reflected a fairly common practice whereby great landlords were assured that others worked to feed them and were held down, legally and economically, while doing so.

This arrangement provided most of the agricultural labour throughout the Middle Ages. Slavery persisted right through the Middle Ages, but it was rare.

In the later Middle Ages, serfdom began to disappear west of the Rhine even as it spread through eastern Europe. Serfdom reached Eastern Europe centuries later than Western Europe – it became dominant around the 15th century. In many of these countries serfdom was abolished during the Napoleonic invasions of the early 19th century, though in some it persisted until mid- or late- 19th century.

== Etymology ==
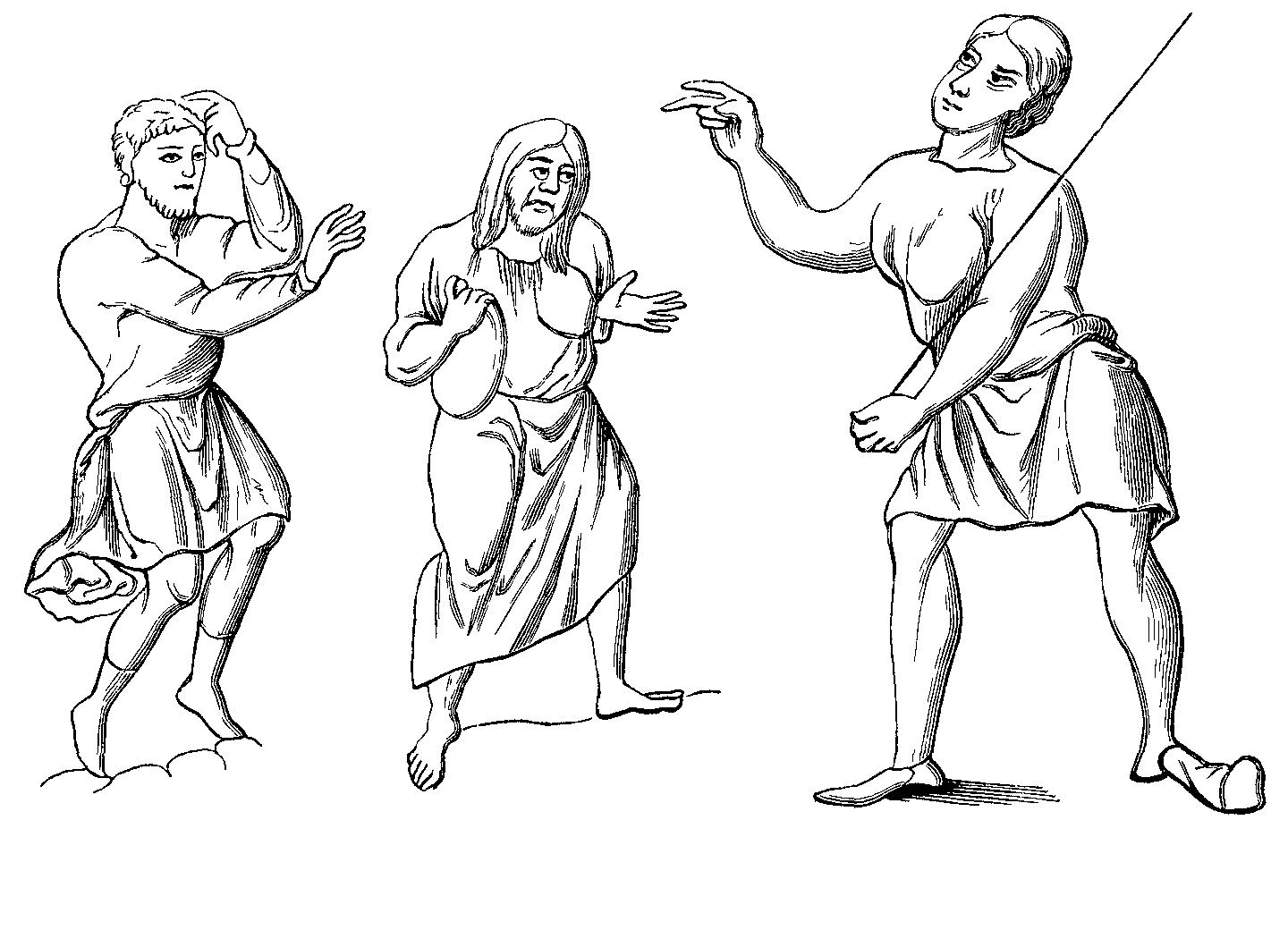
Costumes of slaves or serfs, from the sixth to the twelfth centuries, collected by H. de Vielcastel from original documents in European libraries

The word serf originated from the Middle French serf and was derived from the Latin servus (slave or servant). In Late Antiquity and most of the Middle Ages, what are now called serfs were usually designated in Latin as coloni. As slavery gradually disappeared and the legal status of servi became nearly identical to that of the coloni, the term changed meaning into the modern concept of "serf". The word "serf" is first recorded in English in the late 15th century, and came to its current definition in the 17th century. Serfdom was coined in 1850.

== Dependency and the lower orders ==
Serfs had a specific place in feudal society, as did barons and knights: in return for protection, a serf would reside upon and work a parcel of land within the manor of his lord. Thus, the manorial system exhibited a degree of reciprocity.

One rationale held that serfs and freemen "worked for all" while a knight or baron "fought for all" and a churchman "prayed for all"; thus everyone had a place (see Estates of the realm). The serf was the worst fed and rewarded. However, unlike slaves, they had certain rights in land and property.

A lord of the manor could not sell his serfs as a Roman might sell his slaves. On the other hand, if he chose to dispose of a parcel of land, the serfs associated with that land stayed with it to serve their new lord; simply speaking, they were implicitly sold in mass and as a part of a lot. This unified system preserved for the lord long-acquired knowledge of practices suited to the land. Further, a serf could not abandon his lands without permission, nor did he possess a saleable title in them.

=== Initiation ===
A freeman became a serf usually through force or necessity. Sometimes the greater physical and legal force of a local magnate intimidated freeholders or allodial owners into dependency. Often a few years of crop failure, a war, or brigandage might leave a person unable to make his own way. In such a case, he could strike a bargain with a lord of a manor. In exchange for gaining protection, his service was required: in labour, produce, or cash, or a combination of all. These bargains became formalised in a ceremony known as "bondage", in which a serf placed his head in the lord's hands, akin to the ceremony of homage where a vassal placed his hands between those of his overlord. These oaths bound the lord and his new serf in a feudal contract and defined the terms of their agreement. Often these bargains were severe.

A 7th-century Anglo Saxon "Oath of Fealty" states:

By the Lord before whom this sanctuary is holy, I will to N. be true and faithful, and love all which he loves and shun all which he shuns, according to the laws of God and the order of the world. Nor will I ever with will or action, through word or deed, do anything which is unpleasing to him, on condition that he will hold to me as I shall deserve it, and that he will perform everything as it was in our agreement when I submitted myself to him and chose his will.

To become a serf was a commitment that encompassed all aspects of the serf's life. The children born to serfs inherited their status, and were considered born into serfdom. By taking on the duties of serfdom, people bound themselves and their progeny.

=== Class system ===
The social class of the peasantry can be differentiated into smaller categories. These distinctions were often less clear than suggested by their different names. Most often, there were two types of peasants:

1. freemen, workers whose tenure within the manor was freehold
2. villein

Lower classes of peasantry included cottars and bordars, generally comprising the younger sons of villeins; vagabonds; and slaves.

==== Coloni ====
The colonus system of the late Roman Empire can be considered the predecessor of Western European feudal serfdom.

==== Freemen ====
Freemen, or free tenants, held their land by one of a variety of contracts of feudal land-tenure and were essentially rent-paying tenant farmers who owed little or no service to the lord, and had a good degree of security of tenure and independence. In parts of 11th-century England freemen made up only 10% of the peasant population, and in most of the rest of Europe their numbers were also small.

==== Ministeriales ====
Ministeriales were hereditary unfree knights tied to their lord, that formed the lowest rung of nobility in the Holy Roman Empire.

==== Villeins ====
In England, after the Norman conquest of 1066, an unfree tenant who held their land subject to providing agricultural and other services to their lord was described as a villein. Villeins had limited rights and were tied to their lord. However they did have more rights and were of a higher status than the lowest serf. They had to work on the demesne (their lord's farm) in return for receiving small plots of land, to support their family.

Villeins were not freemen, for example, they and their daughters were not allowed to marry without their lord's permission. They could not move away without their lord's consent and the acceptance of the lord to whose manor they proposed to migrate to. Villeins were generally able to hold their own property, unlike slaves (serfs). Villeinage, as opposed to other forms of serfdom, was most common in Continental European feudalism, where land ownership had developed from roots in Roman law.

A variety of kinds of villeinage existed in Europe in the Middle Ages. Half-villeins received only half as many strips of land for their own use and owed a full complement of labour to the lord, often forcing them to rent out their services to other serfs to make up for this hardship. Villeinage was not a purely uni-directional exploitative relationship. In the Middle Ages, land within a lord's manor provided sustenance and survival, and being a villein guaranteed access to land, and crops secure from theft by marauding robbers. Landlords, even where they were legally entitled to do so, rarely evicted villeins because of the value of their labour. Villeinage was much preferable to being a vagabond, a slave, or an unlanded labourer.

In many medieval countries, a villein could gain freedom by escaping from a manor to a city or borough and living there for more than a year; but this action involved the loss of land rights and agricultural livelihood, a prohibitive price unless the landlord was especially tyrannical or conditions in the village were unusually difficult.

In medieval England, two types of villeins existed – villeins regardant that were tied to land and villeins in gross that could be traded separately from land.

==== Bordars and cottagers ====
In England, the Domesday Book, of 1086, uses bordarii (bordar) and cottarii (cottar) as interchangeable terms, cottar deriving from the native Anglo-Saxon tongue whereas bordar derived from the French.

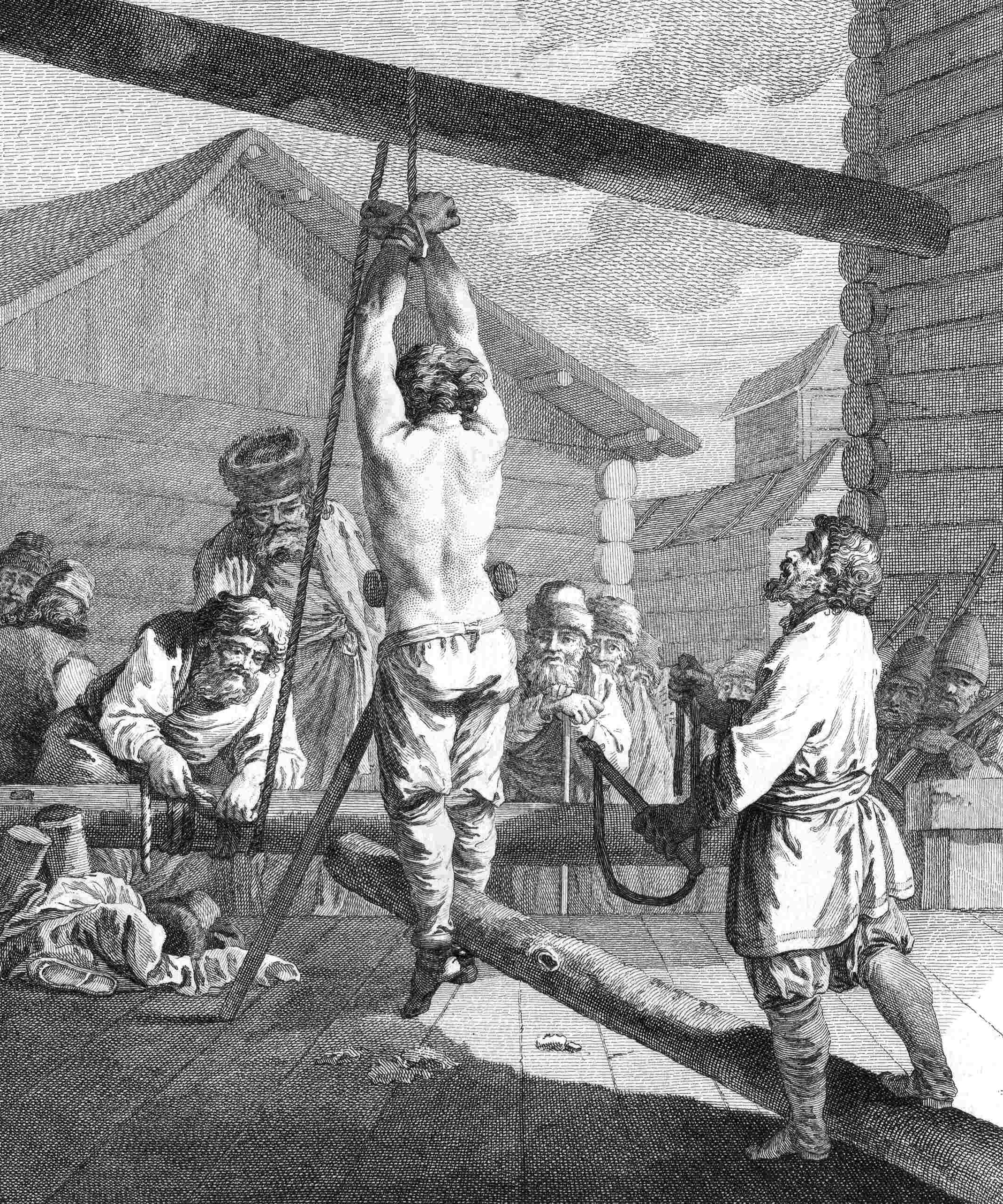
Punishment with a knout. Whipping was a common punishment for Russian serfs.

Status-wise, the bordar or cottar ranked below a villein in the social hierarchy of a manor, holding a cottage, garden and just enough land to feed a family. In England, at the time of the Domesday Survey, this would have comprised between about 1 and 5 acres (0.4 and 2.0 hectares). Under an Elizabethan statute, the Erection of Cottages Act 1588, the cottage had to be built with at least 4 acres (0.02 km^{2}; 0.01 sq mi) of land. The later inclosure acts (1604 onwards) removed the cottars' right to any land: "before the Enclosures Act the cottager was a farm labourer with land and after the Enclosures Act the cottager was a farm labourer without land".

The bordars and cottars did not own their draught oxen or horses. The Domesday Book showed that England comprised 12% freeholders, 35% serfs or villeins, 30% cotters and bordars, and 9% slaves.

==== Smerd ====
Smerdy were a type of serfs above kholops in Medieval Poland and Kievan Rus'.

==== Kholops ====
Kholops were the lowest class of serfs in the medieval and early modern Russia. They had status similar to slaves, and could be freely traded.

==== Slaves ====
The last type of serf was the slave. Slaves had the fewest rights and benefits from the manor. They owned no tenancy in land, worked for the lord exclusively and survived on donations from the landlord. It was always in the interest of the lord to prove that a servile arrangement existed, as this provided him with greater rights to fees and taxes. The status of a man was a primary issue in determining a person's rights and obligations in many of the manorial court-cases of the period. Also, runaway slaves could be beaten if caught.

=== Duties ===
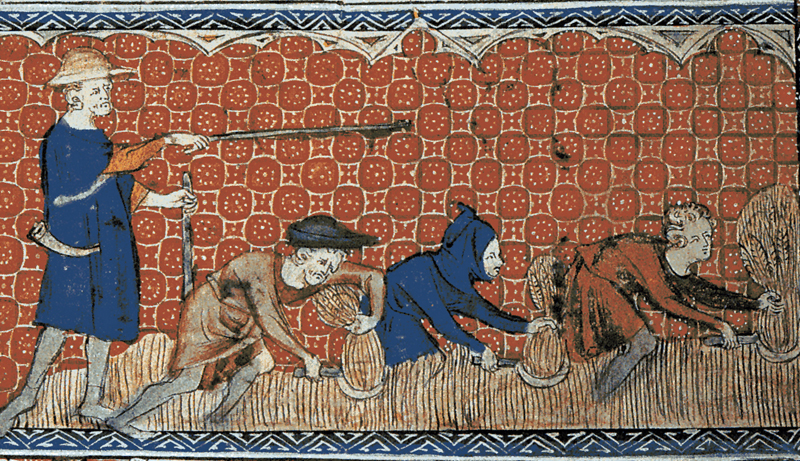
Reeve and serfs in feudal England, c. 1310

The usual serf (not including slaves or cottars) paid his fees and taxes in the form of seasonally appropriate labour. Usually, a portion of the week was devoted to ploughing his lord's fields held in demesne, harvesting crops, digging ditches, repairing fences, and often working in the manor house. The remainder of the serf's time was spent tending his own fields, crops and animals in order to provide for his family. Most manorial work was segregated by gender during the regular times of the year. During the harvest, the whole family was expected to work the fields.

A major difficulty of a serf's life was that his work for his lord coincided with, and took precedence over, the work he had to perform on his own lands: when the lord's crops were ready to be harvested, so were his own. On the other hand, the serf of a benign lord could look forward to being well fed during his service; it was a lord without foresight who did not provide a substantial meal for his serfs during the harvest and planting times. In exchange for this work on the lord's demesne, the serfs had certain privileges and rights, including for example the right to gather deadwood – an essential source of fuel – from their lord's forests.

In addition to service, a serf was required to pay certain taxes and fees. Taxes were based on the assessed value of his lands and holdings. Fees were usually paid in the form of agricultural produce rather than cash. The best ration of wheat from the serf's harvest often went to the landlord. Generally hunting and trapping of wild game by the serfs on the lord's property was prohibited. On Easter Sunday the peasant family perhaps might owe an extra dozen eggs, and at Christmas, a goose was perhaps required, too. When a family member died, extra taxes were paid to the lord as a form of feudal relief to enable the heir to keep the right to till what land he had. Any young woman who wished to marry a serf outside of her manor was forced to pay a fee for the right to leave her lord, and in compensation for her lost labour.

Often there were arbitrary tests to judge the worthiness of their tax payments. A chicken, for example, might be required to be able to jump over a fence of a given height to be considered old enough or well enough to be valued for tax purposes. The restraints of serfdom on personal and economic choice were enforced through various forms of manorial customary law and the manorial administration and court baron.

It was also a matter of discussion whether serfs could be required by law in times of war or conflict to fight for their lord's land and property. In the case of their lord's defeat, their own fate might be uncertain, so the serf certainly had an interest in supporting his lord.

=== Rights ===
Villeins had more rights and status than those held as slaves, but were under a number of legal restrictions that differentiated them from the freeman. Within his constraints, a serf had some freedoms. Though the common wisdom is that a serf owned "only his belly" – even his clothes were the property, in law, of his lord – a serf might still accumulate personal property and wealth, and some serfs became wealthier than their free neighbours, although this happened rarely. A well-to-do serf might even be able to buy his freedom.

A serf could grow what crop he saw fit on his lands, although a serf's taxes often had to be paid in wheat. The surplus he would sell at market.

The landlord could not dispossess his serfs without legal cause and was supposed to protect them from the depredations of robbers or other lords, and he was expected to support them by charity in times of famine. Many such rights were enforceable by the serf in the manorial court.

=== Variations ===
Forms of serfdom varied greatly through time and regions. In some places, serfdom was merged with or exchanged for various forms of taxation.

The amount of labour required varied. In Poland, for example, it was commonly a few days per year per household in the 13th century, one day per week per household in the 14th century, four days per week per household in the 17th century, and six days per week per household in the 18th century. Early serfdom in Poland was mostly limited to the royal territories (królewszczyzny).

"Per household" means that every dwelling had to give a worker for the required number of days. For example, in the 18th century, six people: a peasant, his wife, three children and a hired worker might be required to work for their lord one day a week, which would be counted as six days of labour.

Serfs served on occasion as soldiers in the event of conflict and could earn freedom or even ennoblement for valour in combat. Serfs could purchase their freedom, be manumitted by generous owners, or flee to towns or to newly settled land where few questions were asked. Laws varied from country to country: in England a serf who made his way to a chartered town (i.e. a borough) and evaded recapture for a year and a day obtained his freedom and became a burgher of the town.

== Serfdom by country and location ==
=== Americas ===
==== Aztec Empire ====
In the Aztec Empire, the Tlacotin class held similarities to serfdom. Even at its height, slaves only ever made up 2% of the population.

=== Byzantine Empire ===
The paroikoi were the Byzantine equivalent of serfs.

=== France ===
Serfdom in France started to diminish after the Black Death in France, when the lack of work force made manumission more common from that point onward, and by the 18th-century, serfdom had become relatively rare in most of France.

In 1779, the reforms of Jacques Necker abolished serfdom in all Crown lands in France. On the outbreak of the French Revolution of 1789, between 140,000 and 1,500,000 serfs remained in France, most of them on clerical lands in Franche-Comté, Berry, Burgundy and Marche. However, although formal serfdom no longer existed in most of France, the feudal seigneurial laws still granted noble landlords many of the rights previously exercised over serfs, and the peasants of Auvergne, Nivernais and Champagne, though formally not serfs, could still not move freely.

Serfdom was formally abolished in France on 4 August 1789, and the remaining feudal rights that gave landlords control rights over peasants were abolished in 1789-93.

=== Habsburg monarchy ===
In the Habsburg monarchy, the enlightened absolutist Emperor Joseph II issued the Serfdom Patent that abolished serfdom in Bohemia and the German speaking areas in 1781. In the Kingdom of Hungary, Joseph II issued a similar decree in 1785 after the peasant revolt in Transylvania.

The Serfdom Patent diminished the long-established mastery of the landlords, thus allowing the serfs to independently choose marriage partners, pursue career choices, and move between estates. The document allowed the serfs legal rights in the Habsburg monarchy, but it did not affect the financial dues and the physical corvée (unpaid labor) that the serfs legally owed to their landlords. It continued to exist and was only abolished during the revolutions of 1848.

=== Ireland ===
==== Gaelic Ireland ====
In Gaelic Ireland, a political and social system existing in Ireland from the prehistoric period (500 BC or earlier) up until the Norman conquest (12th century AD), the bothach ("hut-dweller"), fuidir (perhaps linked to fot, "soil") and sencléithe ("old dwelling-house") were low-ranked semi-free servile tenants similar to serfs. According to Laurence Ginnell, the sencléithe and bothach "were not free to leave the territory except with permission, and in practice they usually served the flaith [prince]. They had no political or clan rights, could neither sue nor appear as witnesses, and were not free in the matter of entering into contracts. They could appear in a court of justice only in the name of the flaith or other person to whom they belonged, or whom they served, or by obtaining from an aire of the tuath to which they belonged permission to sue in his name." A fuidir was defined by D. A. Binchy as "a 'tenant at will,' settled by the lord (flaith) on a portion of the latter's land; his services to the lord are always undefined. Although his condition is servile, he retains the right to abandon his holding on giving due notice to the lord and surrendering to him two thirds of the products of his husbandry."

=== Poland ===
Serfdom in Poland became the dominant form of relationship between peasants and nobility in the 17th century, and was a major feature of the economy of the Polish–Lithuanian Commonwealth, although its origins can be traced back to the 12th century.

The first steps towards abolition of serfdom were enacted in the Constitution of 3 May 1791, and it was essentially eliminated by the Połaniec Manifesto. However, these reforms were partly nullified by the partition of Poland. Frederick the Great had abolished serfdom in the territories he gained from the first partition of Poland. Over the course of the 19th century, it was gradually abolished on Polish and Lithuanian territories under foreign control, as the region began to industrialize.

=== Russia ===
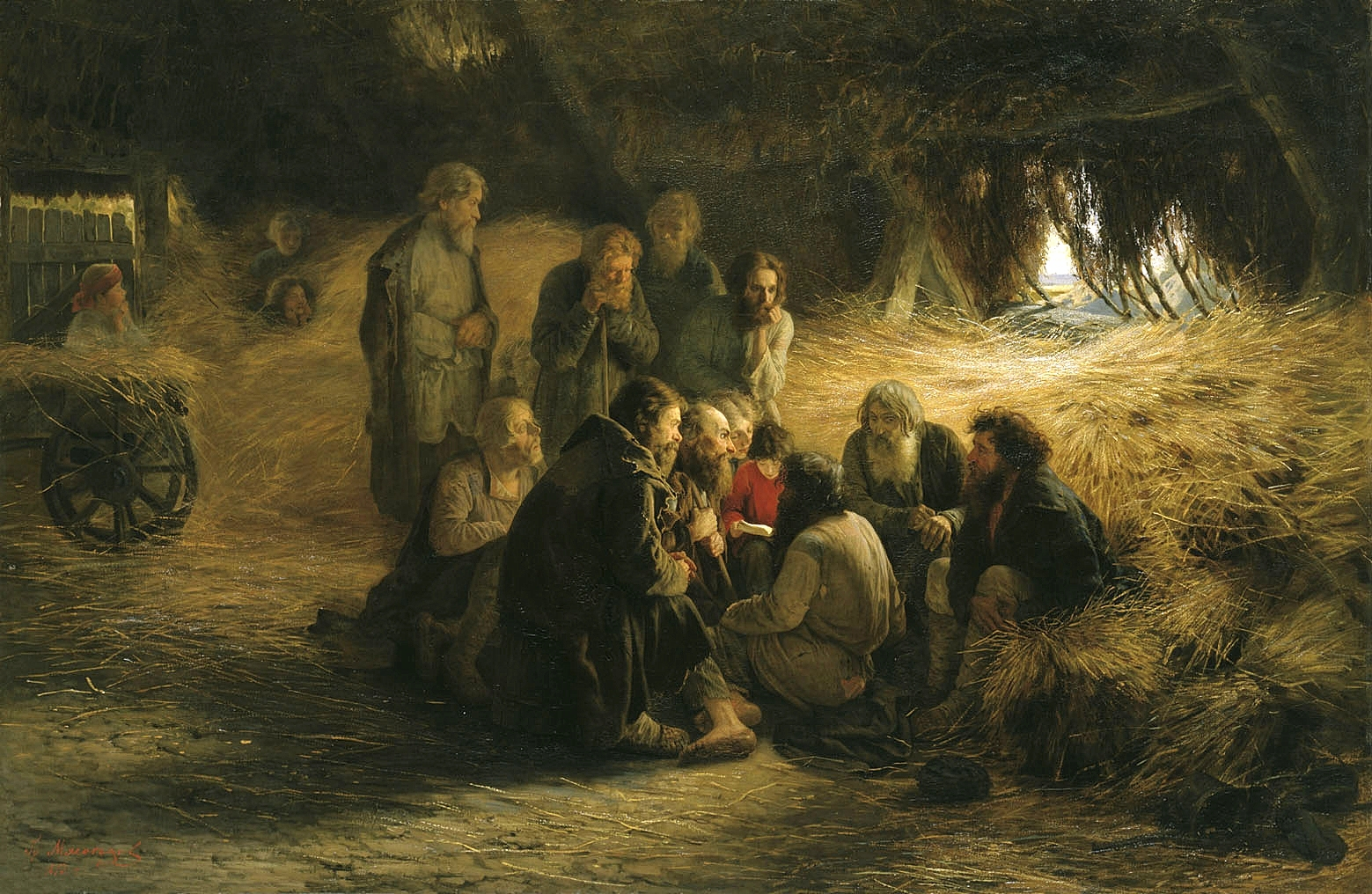
Russian peasants reading the Emancipation Manifesto, an 1873 painting by Grigory Myasoyedov

Serfdom became the dominant form of relation between Russian peasants and nobility in the 17th century. Serfdom only existed in central and southern areas of the Russian Empire. It was never established in the North, in the Urals, or in Siberia. The conscripted serfs dramatically increased the size of the Russian military during the Napoleonic Wars. According to the Encyclopedia of Human Rights:

In 1649 up to three-quarters of Muscovy's peasants, or 13 to 14 million people, were serfs whose material lives were barely distinguishable from slaves. Perhaps another 1.5 million were formally enslaved, with Russian slaves serving Russian masters.

Russia's over 23 million (about 38% of the total population) privately held serfs were freed from their lords by an edict of Alexander II in 1861. The owners were compensated through taxes on the freed serfs. State serfs were emancipated in 1866.

== Emancipation dates by country ==
- Catalonia: 21 April 1486
- Scotland: neyfs (serfs) disappeared by the late 14th century, except in the salt and coal mining industries, where a form of serfdom survived until the Colliers (Scotland) Act 1799.
- England and Wales: obsolete by 15th–16th century.
- Wallachia: 5 August 1746 (land reforms in 1864)
- Moldavia: 6 August 1749 (land reforms in 1864)
- Piedmont-Sardinia: 19 December 1771
- Austria: 1 November 1781 (first step; second step: 1848)
- Bohemia: 1 November 1781 (first step; second step: 1848)
- Baden: 23 July 1783
- Hungary: 22 August 1785 (first step; second step: 1848)
- Denmark: 20 June 1788 (part of Denmark–Norway)
- France: 4 August 1789
- Helvetic Republic: 4 May 1798
- Batavian Republic (Netherlands): constitution of 12 June 1798 (in theory; in practice with the introduction of the French Code Napoléon in 1811)
- Serbia: 1804 (de facto, de jure in 1830)
- Schleswig-Holstein: 19 December 1804 (part of Denmark–Norway)
- Swedish Pomerania: 4 July 1806
- Duchy of Warsaw (Poland): 22 July 1807
- Prussia: 9 October 1807 (effectively 1811–1823)
- Mecklenburg: October 1807 (effectively 1820)
- Bavaria: 31 August 1808
- Old Finland in 1812 (as the area was incorporated into Grand Duchy of Finland where serfdom had not existed in centuries, if ever)
- Nassau: 1 September 1812
- Spain: 18 March 1812 (first step; second step: 26 August 1837)
- Argentina: 1813
- Governorate of Estonia: 23 March 1816

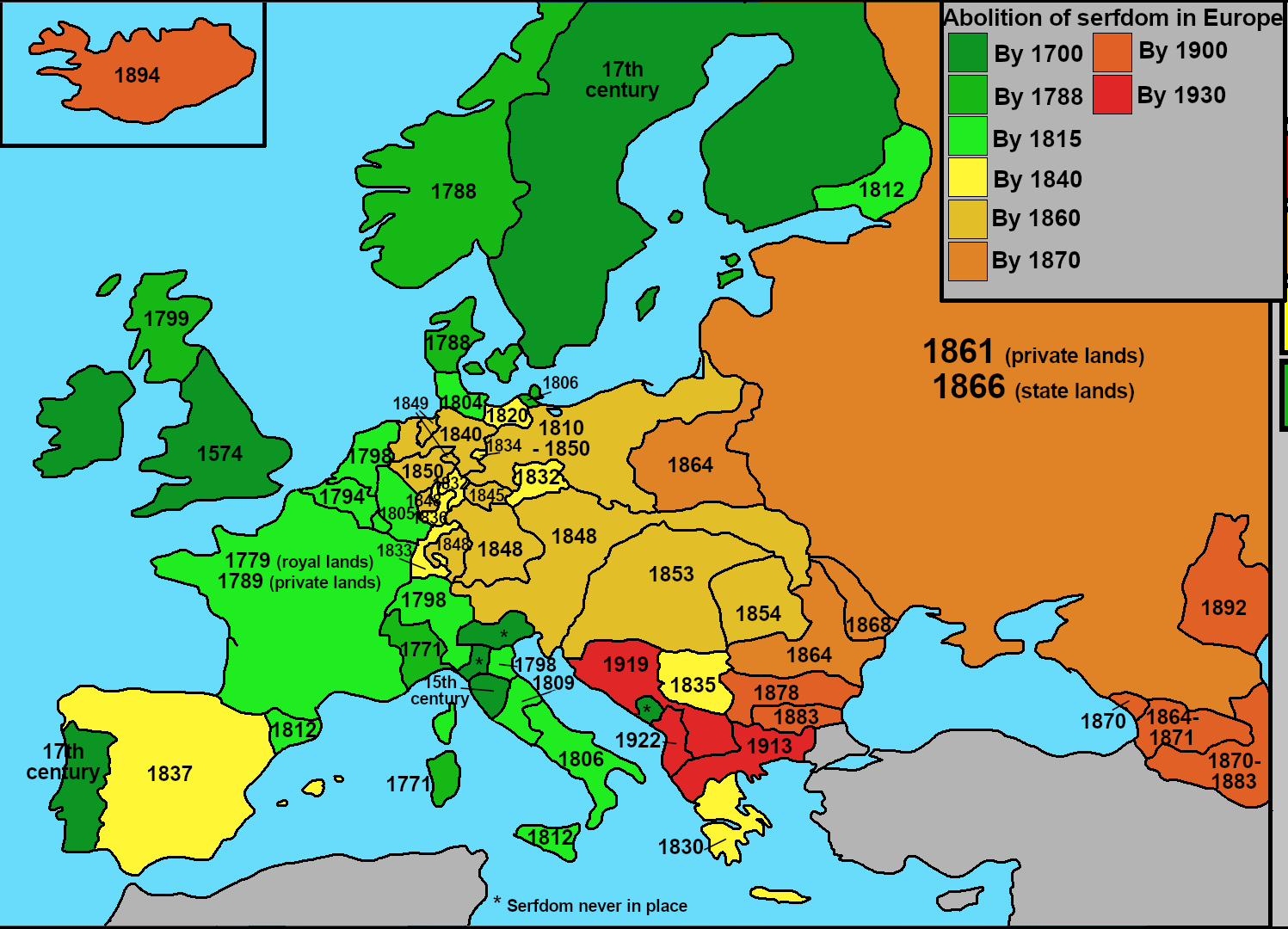
Map of abolition of serfdom in Europe

- Governorate of Courland: 25 August 1817
- Württemberg: 18 November 1817
- Governorate of Livonia: 26 March 1819
- Hanover: 1831
- Saxony: 17 March 1832
- Hawaii: 1835
- Hungary: 11 April 1848
- Croatia: First steps in 1780 and 1785. Final step on 8 May 1848.
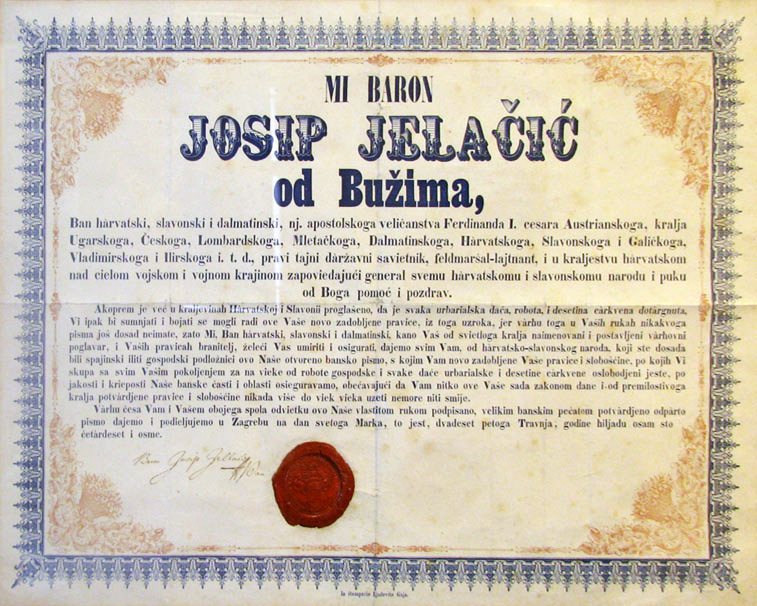
  The proclamation by count Josip Jelačić abolishing serfdom in the Kingdom of Croatia
- Austrian Empire: 7 September 1848
- Bulgaria: 1858 (de jure by Ottoman Empire; de facto in 1878)
- Russian Empire: 19 February 1861 (see Emancipation reform of 1861)
- Tonga: 1862
- Congress Poland: 1864
- Georgia: 1864–1871
- Kalmykia: 1892
- Iceland: 1894 (Vistarband)
- Bosnia and Herzegovina: 1918
- Afghanistan: 1923
- Bhutan: officially abolished by 1959
- Tibet, People's Republic of China: 29 March 1959, but use of "serf" for Tibet is controversial. There are differences depending on the region and sect.

== See also ==
- Alipin
- Birkarls
- Coolie
- Encomienda – Spanish serfdom transplanted to the Americas
- Fengjian
- Fief
- Folwark
- Fugitive peasants
- Hacienda – Spanish manors
- Josephinism
- Kolkhoz
- Maenor – Welsh manors
- Peon
- Ritsuryō
- Sharecropping
- Shōen – Japanese serfdom
- Slavery in medieval Europe
- Taeog – Welsh serfs
- Taxation as theft
- Thrall
