= Staterius =

Legendary king of Scotland

Staterius is a legendary king of Scotland who appears in Geoffrey of Monmouth's 12th-century pseudohistory, the De gestis Britonum. In the Latin text, he is described as rex Albaniae, "King of Scotland".

== Geoffrey of Monmouth's account ==
According to Geoffrey, a period of civil war left Britain divided among five rival kings. After Dunvallo Molmutius, king of Cornwall, defeated and killed Pinner, king of Loegria, Staterius formed an alliance with Rudaucus, king of Cambria. Together they invaded Dunvallo's territories with the intention of devastating the land and its inhabitants. Dunvallo opposed them with 30,000 men, but much of the day passed without either side gaining a decisive advantage. He therefore selected 600 of his boldest soldiers and ordered them to put on the armour of slain enemy troops. Similarly disguised, Dunvallo led them into the enemy formations. When they reached the place where Staterius and Rudaucus were stationed, they attacked and killed both kings. Fearing that his own troops might mistake him for an enemy, Dunvallo resumed his original armour and renewed the attack. He defeated the remaining forces and subsequently conquered the territories of the two dead kings, thereby establishing his rule over the whole island of Britain.

== Origin of the name ==
The medievalist Ben Guy identifies Staterius as one of several figures whose names Geoffrey derived from the Harleian genealogies. The forms Pincr and Stater occur in the remote generations of a pedigree of the kings of Dyfed. According to Guy, these were not originally personal names but Latin titles: pincerna, meaning "cupbearer", and stator, meaning "magistrate's marshal". Geoffrey transformed them into the rival kings Pinner and Staterius.

Staterius is distinct from Stater, a separate figure who appears much later in Geoffrey's narrative among the rulers attending King Arthur's court at Caerleon. Stater is king of the Demetae (South Wales).

== Later reception and interpretation ==
The 14th-century Middle English Castleford's Chronicle retells the story of Staterius, describing him as king of Albany and one of the five rulers among whom Britain was divided. He and Rudaucus are killed after Dunvallo and his men enter the enemy army wearing captured armour.

Paul Russell has compared this stratagem with an episode in book 2 of Virgil's Aeneid, in which Aeneas and his companions disguise themselves in Greek armour. Russell interprets Dunvallo's decision to change back into his own armour as an allusion to the failure of the comparable Trojan stratagem in the Aeneid.
