= Welsh units of measurement =

Historical units of measurement used in Wales

Welsh units of measurement are those in use in Wales between the Sub-Roman period (prior to which the Britons used Roman units) and the 13th-century Edwardian conquest (after which English units were imposed). Modern Wales no longer employs these units even for customary purposes but instead follows the custom as elsewhere in Britain of using a mixture of metric and Imperial units.

== Length ==
In the Venedotian Code used in Gwynedd, the units of length were said to have been codified by Dyfnwal Moelmud but retained unchanged by Hywel Dda. The code provided for computing the units variously, as well as deriving them from grains of barley. In measuring milk and its legal worth (teithi), disputes over the length of the inch used in the container were to be resolved by the width of the judge's thumb. The code notes that in some areas of Wales, the rod used to compute the Welsh acre (erw) was not reckoned from feet but taken to be "as long as the tallest man in the [tref], with his hand above his head".

- 3 barleycorns (Med. gronyn heyd, Mod. heidden) = 1 inch (Note: Roche gives this as computed the length of grains of barley rather than their width, but this does not appear anywhere in the statutes and early reckoning elsewhere was by the width or breadth of the barleycorn.)
- 3 inches (Med. moduet, Mod. modfedd) = 1 palm
- 3 palms (Med. palyw, Mod. palf) = 1 foot
- 3 feet (Med. troetued, Mod. troedfedd, lit. "footlength") = 1 pace
- 4 feet = 1 short yoke (Med. uerr yeu or uerryeu, Mod. byr iau)
- 8 feet = 1 field yoke (Med. veieu) or second yoke (Med. eyl yeu)
- 3 paces (cam) = 1 leap
- 12 feet = 4 paces = 1 lateral yoke (Med. gesseylyeu or cessel-yeu)
- 16 feet = 1 long yoke (Med. hyryeu, Mod. hir iau) = rod (Med. gwyalen, Mod. gwialen) (Note: Although note that Wade-Evans preferred 18 feet to the rod and the Latin Peniarth MS. 28 gives 16½ feet to the long yoke.)
- 3 leaps (Med. neyt, Mod. naid) = 1 land
- 1000 lands (Med. tyr, Mod. tir) = 1 mile (Med. mylltyr, Mod. milltir)

== Area ==
In the Venedotian Code used in Gwynedd, the basic field unit was the Welsh acre or erw, whose legal description—its breadth as far as a man can reach in either direction with an ox-goad as long as the long yoke (16 Welsh feet) and its length "thirty times that measure"—is noted by Owen as ambiguous. He finds it more likely, however, that the "measure" to be multiplied thirty times is the width of the acre (that is, two long yokes) rather than a single long yoke.

Thus, at least in theory,

- 2 rods × 30 rods = 1 acre ≈ 1,440 square imperial yards, or
  2 rods × 60 rods = 1 acre ≈ 4,320 square imperial yards
- 4 acres (Med. erỽ, Mod. erw, lit. "tilled [land]"; Latin: acra) = 1 homestead
- 4 homesteads (Med. tydyn, Mod. tyddyn) = 1 shareland
- 4 sharelands (Med. randyr, Mod. rhandir) = 1 holding (Note: Lewis's account, based on Gwynedd's Black Book of Chirk, gives the gafael as holding 34 erwau rather than 64.)
- 4 holdings (Med. gauael, Mod. gafael) = 1 township
- 4 townships (Med. trew, Mod. tref) = 1 manor
- 12 1/2 manors (Med. maynaul, Mod. maenor) = 1 commote
- 2 commotes (Med. kymut, Mod. cwmwd) = 1 cantref = 25,600 acres

although in fact the commutes and cantrefs were fixed political entities with quite various sizes. The 11th-century Bleddyn ap Cynfyn is also described as having changed the legal composition of the homestead for purposes of inheritance and so on, varying its size depending on the social status of the owner. The homestead of a nobleman (uchelwr) was 12 Welsh acres, that of a serf (Med. eyllt, Mod. aillt) had 8, and that of a bondsman or slave (Med. godayauc) had 4. The text, however, notes the uncommonness of this division and says it was generally understood as 4 acres regardless of status.

In the Dimetian Code used in southern Wales, the same divisions were reckoned differently:

- 2 rods × 18 rods = 1 acre
- 312 acres = 1 shareland
- 3 sharelands held by serfs = 1 serf-town
- 4 sharelands held in freehold = 1 free town
- 7 serf-towns (taeogtref) = 1 lowland manor (Med. maenaỽr vro, Mod. maenor vro) = 936 acres
- 12 free towns (Med. tref ryd, Mod. tref rhydd) = 1 upland manor (Med. maenaỽr vrthtir, Mod. maenor wrthdir) = 1248 acres

== Volume ==
- 1 Hestawr = 2 Winchester bushels

== Time ==
The Welsh used an eight or nine-day week, rather than a seven-day one. Even today, the modern Welsh word for "week" is wythnos (literally, eight nights).

== See also ==
- Roman units
- English units
- Megalithic yard, a proposed measure employed by the British megalith builders
- Historical weights and measures
