= Molmutine Laws =

Historic system of laws in Wales

The Molmutine Laws were the laws said to have been instituted over the Britons by Dyfnwal Moelmud, who is also referred by the Latin form of his name, Dunvallo Molmutius (from which the Molmutine Laws take their title). The Laws were most famously described by Geoffrey of Monmouth in his Historia Regum Britanniae. Little remains known of these laws, with surviving Welsh codes simply noting that Dyfnwal's laws were largely superseded by the new codes instituted by Hywel Da. Hywel was said, however, to have retained Dyfnwal's units of measurement.

== Legendary accounts ==
=== History of the Kings of Britain ===
Geoffrey of Monmouth's pseudohistorical History of the Kings of Britain describes Dyfnwal as its "Dunvallo Molmutius". In his account, one of the Molmutine Laws declared that the temples of the gods and cities should act as sanctuaries from death. Furthermore, anyone who fled to a temple for being accused of a crime must be pardoned by the accuser upon departure from the temple. This law soon included all roads leading to temples and all farmers were declared safe from such crimes. Geoffrey credited the British Trojans as the original source of many of Dyfnwal's laws, including one allowing the reign of queens.

=== Welsh triads ===
The Molmutine Laws are among the texts said to have been "discovered" by the forger Iolo Morganwg around the year 1800. They are given in the form of triads and include:

- There are three tests of civil liberty: equality of rights, equality of taxation, freedom to come and go.
- Three things are indispensable to a true union of nations: sameness of laws, rights, and language.
- There are three things free to all Britons: the forest, the unworked mine, the right of hunting.
- There are three property birthrights of every Briton: five British acres of land for a home, the right of suffrage in the enacting of the laws, the male at twenty-one, the female on her marriage.
- There are three things which every Briton may legally be compelled to attend: the worship of God, military service, the courts of law.
- There are three things free to every man, Briton or foreigner, the refusal of which no law will justify: water from spring, river, or well; firing from a decayed tree; a block of stone not in use.
- There are three classes which are exempt from bearing arms: bards, judges, graduates in law or religion. These represent God and His peace, and no weapon must ever be found in their hands.
- There are three persons who have a right of public maintenance: the old, the babe, the foreigner who can not speak the British tongue.
- There are three things free to a country and its borders: the roads, the rivers, and the places of worship. These are under the protection of God and His peace. (Note: Morganwg then claimed that "In this law originated the term 'The King's Highway.'")

== See also ==
- Welsh units
