= Church of St John the Baptist, Bristol =

Church in Bristol, England

Church of St John the Baptist
- St John on the Wall
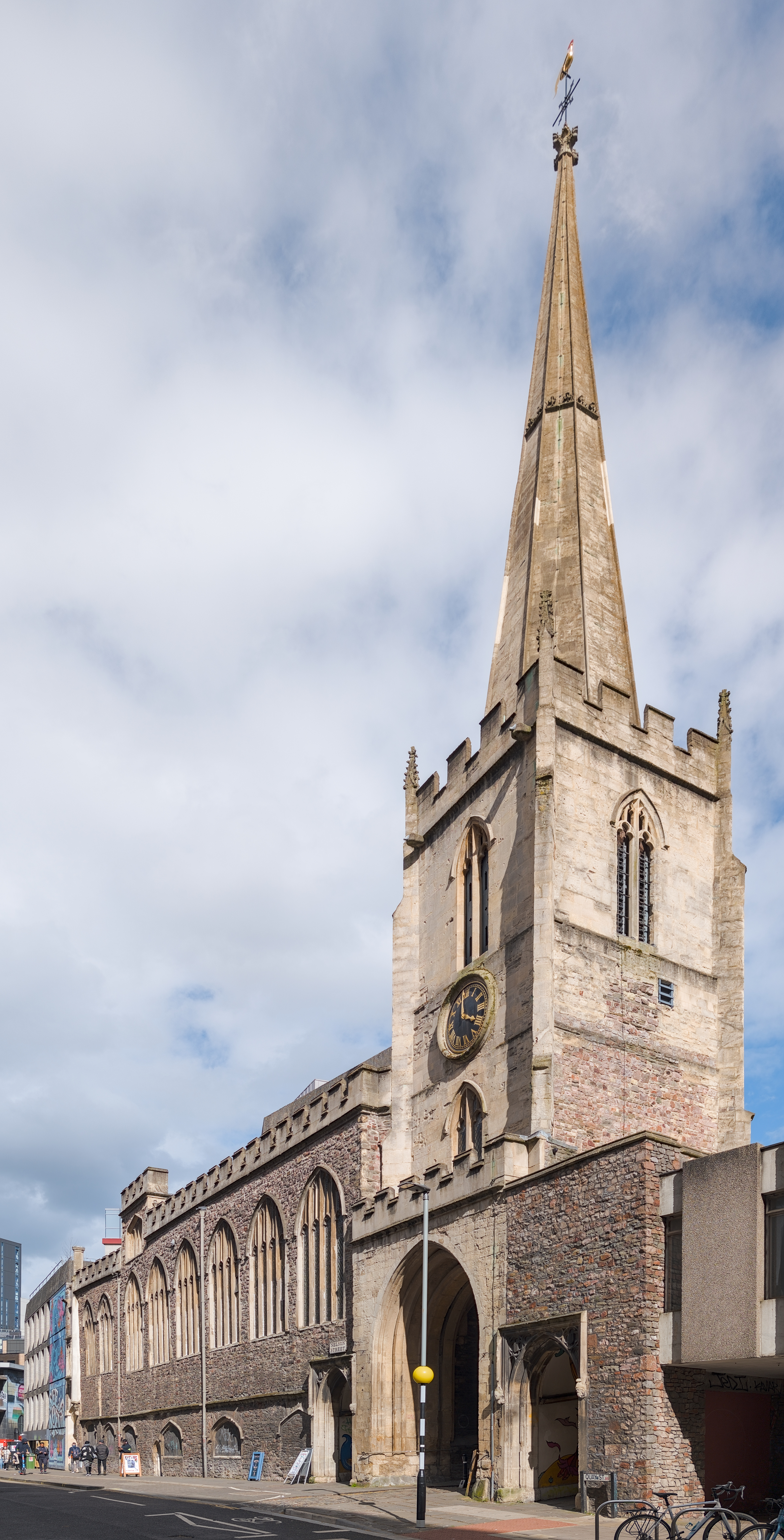
- St John's church showing the gateway over the city wall

- Location in Bristol
- 51°27′23″N 2°35′48″W
- Location: Bristol, England
- Denomination: Church of England
- Previous denomination: Roman Catholic

Architecture
- Heritage designation: Grade I
- Designated: 8 January 1959
- Style: Perpendicular Gothic
- Closed: 1984

Specifications
- Height: 110 ft (34 m)

The Church of St John the Baptist in Bristol, also known as St John on the Wall, is a historic church in the care of heritage charity the Churches Conservation Trust. The upper church and its medieval vaulted crypt is located at the lower end of Broad Street and is built into the old city's medieval walls. It is a Grade I listed building.

== Design and construction ==
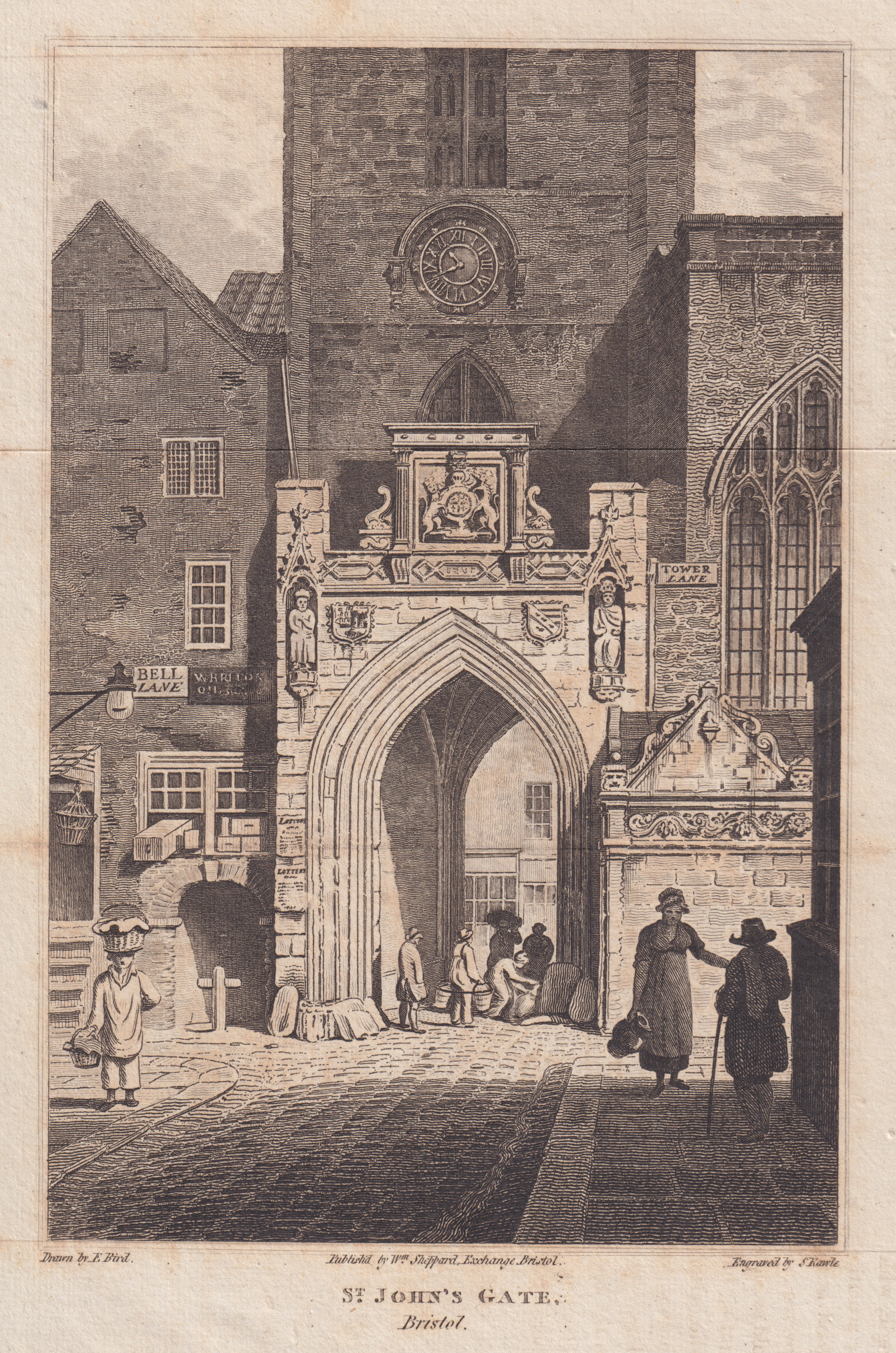
Printed line engraving from 1818 showing the south view of the old city gate of Bristol, UK, with the Church of St John the Baptist, Bristol tower above it, and Nave built into the city walls. The engraving shows historic buildings around the church which are no longer standing, and eight figures walking through the gate in 19th century costume. On the right of the picture can be seen the building abutting the church which held the St John's Conduit on the east side of the building on Broad Street. The conduit today is on the west side within the old city walls on Quay Street.

The church was built in the 14th century (and heavily modified in the 19th century) with the tower and steeple over St John's Gate, the last remaining city gateway. The church is very narrow as it is built into and alongside the city walls. Consequently, it is also known as St John's on the Wall. The rood stair entrance high up on the wall shows where the earlier great rood screen would have stood. Similar rood stair entrances can be seen at St Peter's, St Philip and Jacob, St Stephen's and Temple.

Beneath the church is a vaulted crypt, which was dedicated to the Holy Cross. A conduit has supplied water from Brandon Hill since 1374, and the course of the pipe is marked in places by small plaques set into the pavements.

== Monuments and artwork ==
Among the monuments in the church are those of Walter Frampton (died 1357), three times Mayor of Bristol and a great benefactor of the church, and a brass commemorating Thomas Rowley (died c. 1478), whose name was used by the 18th-century teenage poet Thomas Chatterton as a pseudonym under which to write his forgeries of medieval poetry.

On the south side of the gate, there are statues of the legendary founders of Bristol, Brennus and Belinus, facing up Broad Street; it is possible that they are actually older than the fabric of the gate.

The interiors of the two arches either side of the main gateway are now covered in commissioned graffiti murals.

The burial ground of St John's survives; it is visible from John Street and the entrance gate is in Tailors Court which is accessed from Broad Street. The burial ground is closed to the public.

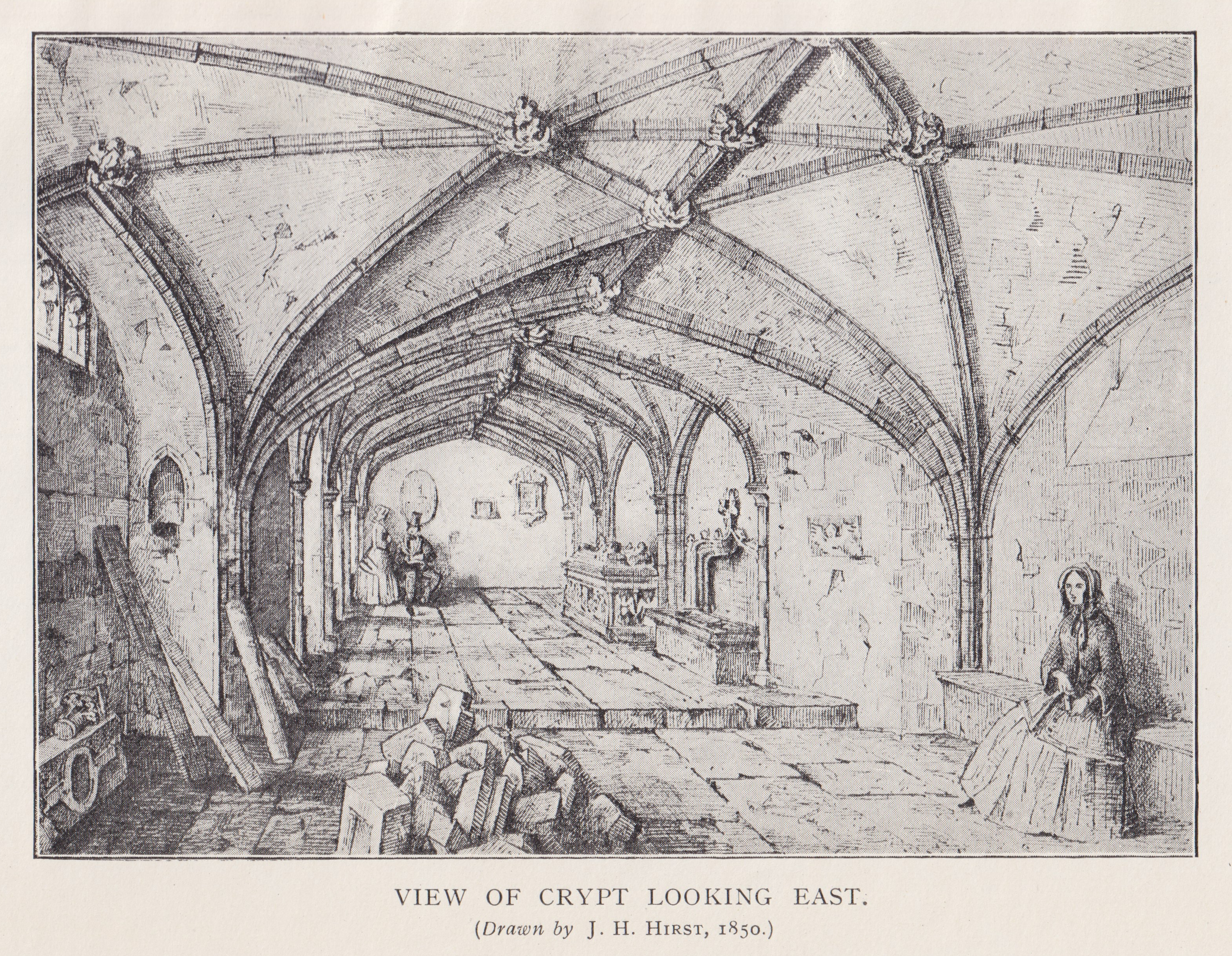
View of the crypt, looking east, 1850

== Archives ==
Parish records for St John the Baptist church, Bristol are held at Bristol Archives (Ref. P.St JB) (online catalogue) including baptism and marriage registers and a burial register. The archive also includes records of the incumbent, churchwardens, overseer of the Poor, parochial church council, charities, schools and vestry plus deeds, plans and photographs.

== Current usage ==
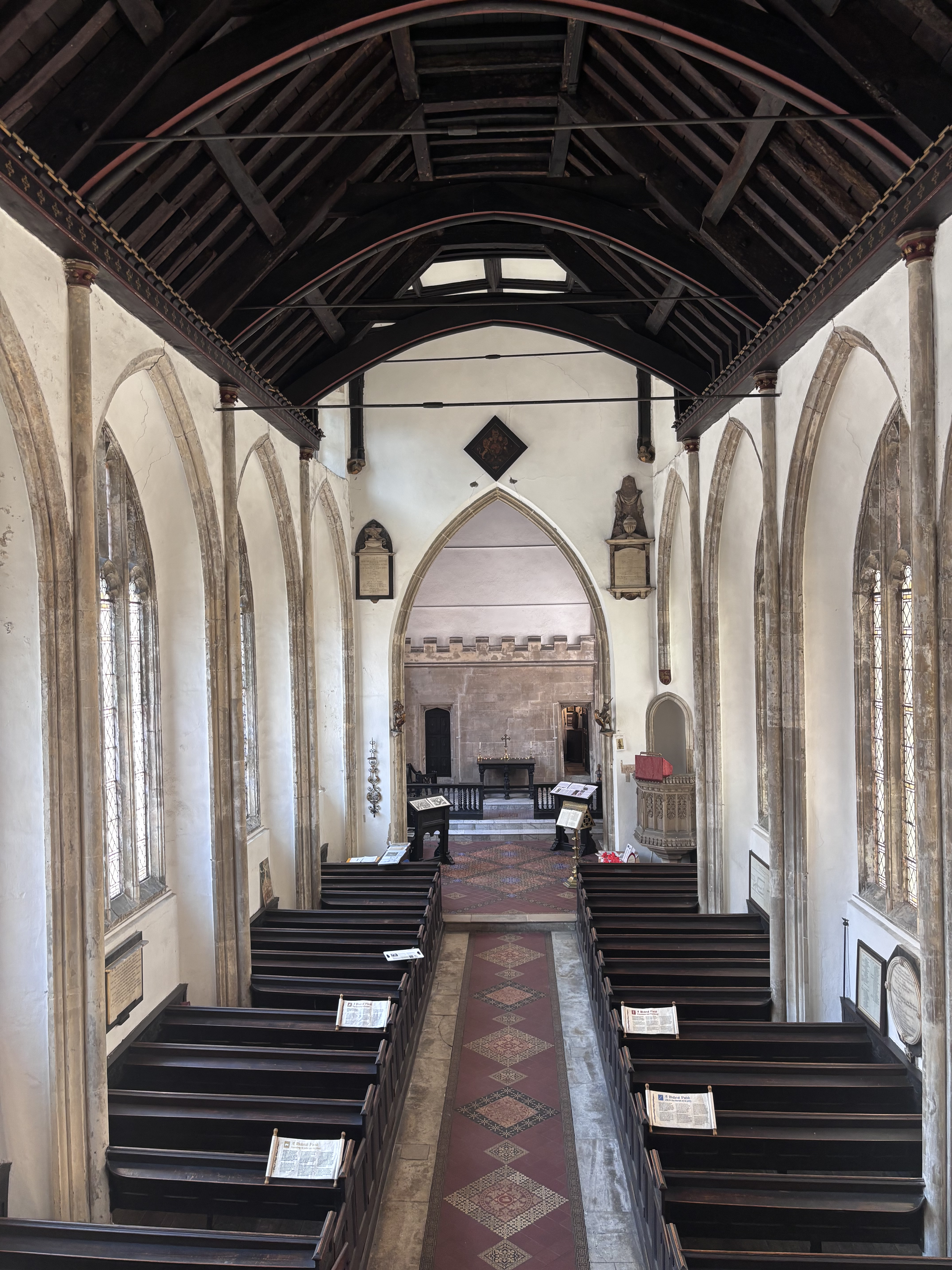
The Interior of the Church

St. John on the Wall is cared for by The Churches Conservation Trust, the national heritage charity. It is open daily for free tours and interactive visitor displays telling the story of medieval Bristol. The Trust have also produced a visual slide story for visitors. St John on the Wall hosts a small programme of free family events, gigs, exhibitions and concerts. It's recorded in the National Heritage List for England as a designated Grade I listed building. The church was vested in the Trust on 25 June 1985.

The Churches Conservation Trust promotes 'The Crypt' as an atmospheric art space for hire as a live music venue and art gallery. It can be toured virtually. The crypt can also been used as a filming location

in 2022 the church was closed due to fears that the spire was becoming unstable.

== Congregation ==
After the bombing of St Mary le Port Church in 1940 the congregation of this historically evangelical, Protestant and Calvinist church, and their rector, William Dodgson-Sykes, moved to St John on the Wall Church, where the congregation remained, in gradually declining numbers, until the building was closed for worship by the Church Commissioners in 1984, (after a protracted struggle by the congregation). The remaining congregation then moved to the Chapel of Foster's Almshouses, and joined the Church of England (Continuing) in 1995. The C of E (Continuing) no longer lists a congregation in Bristol - some of the congregation joined with the new Free Presbyterian Church (Ulster) congregation in Horfield, Bristol.

== See also ==
- Churches in Bristol
- Grade I listed buildings in Bristol
- List of churches preserved by the Churches Conservation Trust in South West England
