= Bathanatos =

Thracian Celtic king ruling the Scordisci

Bathanatos or Bathanatius (Ancient Greek: Βαθανάτιος) Celtic king in Thrace. He was the leader of the Scordisci, a Gaulish tribe, who invaded ancient Greece with Brennus in 279 BCE.

After the defeat of Brennus, Bathanatius led his people to the banks of the Danube, at the confluence of the Sava, roughly around Belgrade, where they settled down. The way by which they returned received from their leader the name of Bathanatia; and his descendants were called Bathanati.
