= Maenor =

Gathering of villages in medieval Wales

The maenor (pl. maenorau) was a gathering of villages in medieval Wales. In North Wales the word maenol was used for a similar, but not identical, idea.

Although it is very often conflated with the English manor, maenor predates that Norman French term by centuries and is apparently etymologically unrelated, instead deriving from Welsh maen ("stone") possibly originally describing the stone homes of local lords or the area sharing a single mill.

Two kinds of maenorau were distinguished: those of the nobles and free yeomen (the maenor wrthdir) and those of the taeog (serfs; the maenor vro). According to the Laws of Hywel Dda, the maenor wrthdir comprised thirteen "free towns" (trev ryd) of 1248 Welsh acres each and the maenor vro seven "serftowns" (taeogtrev) of 936 Welsh acres each. By the late Medieval period, each town was considered to have its own smith, plow, kiln, churn, cat, cock, bull, and shepherd. Each free town was obliged to provide one pound of silver or its equivalent each year to the king for his entertainment expenses.
