= Dyfnwal Moelmud =

King of Cornwall
- Predecessor: Cloten
- Successor: Belinus (South Britain); Brennius (North Britain)

King of Loegria
- Predecessor: Ymner
- Successor: Belinus (South Britain); Brennius (North Britain)

King of Kambria
- Predecessor: Rudaucus
- Successor: Belinus (South Britain); Brennius (North Britain)

King of Albania
- Predecessor: Staterius
- Successor: Belinus (South Britain); Brennius (North Britain)

King of Britain
- Predecessor: Porrex I
- Successor: Belinus (South Britain); Brennius (North Britain)
- Issue: Belinus; Brennius
- Father: Cloten

Dyfnwal Moelmud (Welsh for "Dyfnwal the Bald and Silent"; Latin: Dunvallo Molmutius; fl. c. 450–470) was accounted as an early king and lawmaker among the West Welsh Cornish, credited with the codification of their standard units of measure. He also figures as a legendary king of the Britons in Geoffrey of Monmouth's History of the Kings of the Britons.

== History ==
Only two known historical documents mention Dyfnwal. A tenth-century genealogy in the British Library (Harley MS 3859) identifies him as the grandson of Coel Hen, and ancestor of Morcant Bulc. A fifteenth-century genealogy in Jesus College, Oxford (MS 20) also identifies him in the same way.

== Legend ==
In Geoffrey's account, Dyfnwal was the son of Cloten, the King of Cornwall, and he restored order after the "Civil War of the Five Kings". His family was a cadet branch of the dynasty of Brutus, the dominant line having ended with Porrex I before the civil war. The Book of Baglan expands on this by making Dyfnwal descend directly through the male line of Camber via his eldest son, Gorbonian.

Dyfnwal was the King of Cornwall during the war created in the power vacuum left by Porrex I. He defeated Pinner, the king of Loegria. In response, Rudaucus, king of Cambria, and Staterius, king of Albany, allied together and destroyed much of Dyfnwal's land. The two sides met in battle and were stalemated. Dyfnwal then took 600 of his men and himself and dressed themselves in the armour of the dead enemies. They led a charge deep into enemy lines where they killed the two kings. After this battle, Dyfnwal destroyed the remaining defences of the kings and pillaged their lands.

Following the defeat of the rival kings, Dyfnwal created a crown like that of his predecessors and claimed the throne of Britain. He created a set of rules for the kingdom called the Molmutine Laws, which nearly ended robbery within his kingdom and lasted for many centuries. The Book of Baglan also makes him the founder of Bristol. He reigned in peace and prosperity for forty years then died and was buried in the Temple of Concord, a tribute to his laws, which resided in Trinovantum. His death sparked another civil war between his two sons, Belinus and Brennius.

== See also ==
- Welsh units

Legendary titles
Preceded by Cloten	King of Cornwall	Succeeded by Belinus (South Britain); Brennius (North Britain)
Preceded by Ymner	King of Loegria	Succeeded by Belinus (South Britain); Brennius (North Britain)
Preceded by Rudaucus	King of Kambria	Succeeded by Belinus (South Britain); Brennius (North Britain)
Preceded by Staterius	King of Albania	Succeeded by Belinus (South Britain); Brennius (North Britain)
Vacant Civil War Title last held by Porrex I	King of Britain	Succeeded by Belinus (South Britain); Brennius (North Britain)
