= Taeog =

A taeog (pl. taeogion; Latin: villanus) was a native serf or villein of the medieval Welsh kingdoms. The term was used in south Wales and literally denoted someone "belonging to the house" (ty) of the lord's manor. The equivalent term in north Wales was aillt or mab aillt (lit. "shorn" or "shaven fellow").

The taeogion were distinguished both from the nobility (boneddigion) above them and the foreign-born (alltudion) and slaves (caethion) below. Although they might use patronymics, they were considered as having no pedigree and were bound to their land until they were freed in one of three ways: if they were elevated to one of the 24 principal offices of the Welsh court; if they became a tonsured cleric; or if a new church were built within their town with the king's permission.

The class of all taeogion were divided between the serfs of the king's land and those of the nobles', with the wergild of the former valued at twice that of the latter. Those of the king were administered by the mayor. Both groups were restricted to land holdings in special settlements set aside for them, the taeogtrev (lit. "serf town").

In the case of the northern Welsh kingdoms, at least, the taeogion represented the original Roman and Irish inhabitants of the region subjugated by the Men of the North under Cunedda.

== See also ==
- Welsh law
