= Brennus =

Name used by two Gaulish chieftains

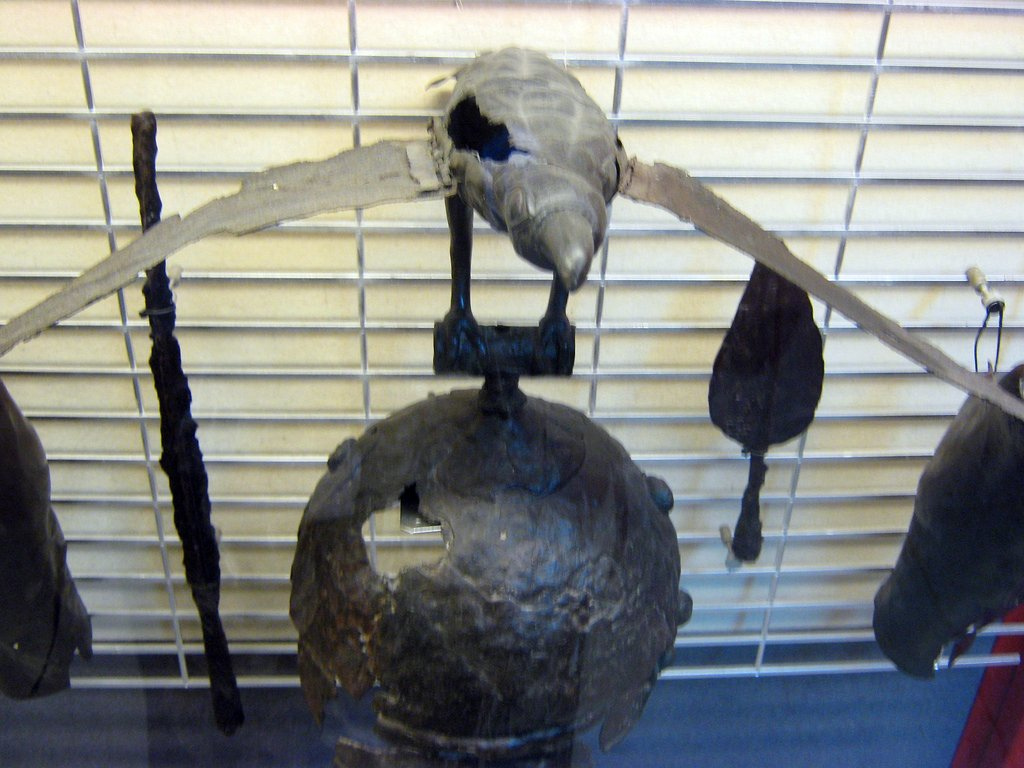
The Celtic Helmet from Satu Mare, Romania (northern Dacia), an Iron Age raven totem helmet, dated around 4th century BC. A similar helmet is depicted on the Gundestrup cauldron, being worn by one of the mounted warriors (detail tagged here). See also an illustration of Brennus wearing a similar helmet.

Brennus or Brennos is the name of two Gaulish chieftains, famous in ancient history:

- Brennus, chieftain of the Senones, a Gallic tribe originating from the modern areas of France known as Seine-et-Marne, Loiret, and Yonne; in 387 BC, in the Battle of the Allia, he led an army of Cisalpine Gauls in their attack on Rome.
- Another Brennus was one of the leaders of the army of Gauls who, with Bathanatius, attempted to invade and settle in the Greek mainland in 279 BC. After a looting spree and after managing to pass Thermopylae by encircling the Greek army and forcing it to retreat he made his way to the rich treasury at Delphi but he was defeated by the re-assembled Greek army. Brennus was heavily injured at the battle of Delphi and committed suicide there.

The linguistic origins of the name are unclear, despite two theories linking it to Welsh words. Despite suggestions by scholars as early as the 12th century AD, including one by Geoffrey of Monmouth in his Historia Regum Britanniae, Brennus is not likely to share a common origin with the Welsh personal name Bran (or Brân) meaning "crow"; the similarity of the names is deemed to be superficial. Recurrence of the name Brennus makes it possible that it was a title rather than a proper name. However, despite assertions by some 19th-century scholars, Brennus and the modern Welsh word for "king", brenin (earlier breenhin) are not related. Brenin is instead derived from the Celtic *brigantinos, meaning "(someone) pre-eminent, outstanding".

== Similar names ==
Variants and adaptations of the name may include:

- Brân the Blessed, Welsh Bendigeidfran, a legendary giant leader of the British from the Mabinogion, the probable Welsh antecedent of Geoffrey's Brennius;
- Brinno, chief of the Cananefates – a tribe from Germania Inferior – whose name was said by Tacitus to be that of "a family of rebels";
- "Brennius", listed in Geoffrey of Monmouth's Historia as brother of Bellinus, the latter a legendary king of the Britons; the two are said to have conquered Gaul and then Rome. Monmouth likely created Brennius as a composite of the two historical Gauls named Brennus. Geoffrey's Brennius was mentioned by Thomas Howard, 3rd Duke of Norfolk, in 1530, when the duke, while arguing in favor of the claims of the House of Tudor claims to imperial status, told Holy Roman Imperial ambassador Eustace Chapuys that Brennius had founded Bristol and conquered Rome.

== Allusions ==
- The name was given to the French battleship Brennus (commissioned 1896).
- The name in its form "Brennos" is used for one of three fictitious "barbarian" chieftains in the 2008 video game Civilization Revolution.
