= Battle of Morbihan =

Rome v. Gallic Veneti, naval, Roman victory

Coordinates: 47.50°N 2.87°W

- Part of the Gallic Wars
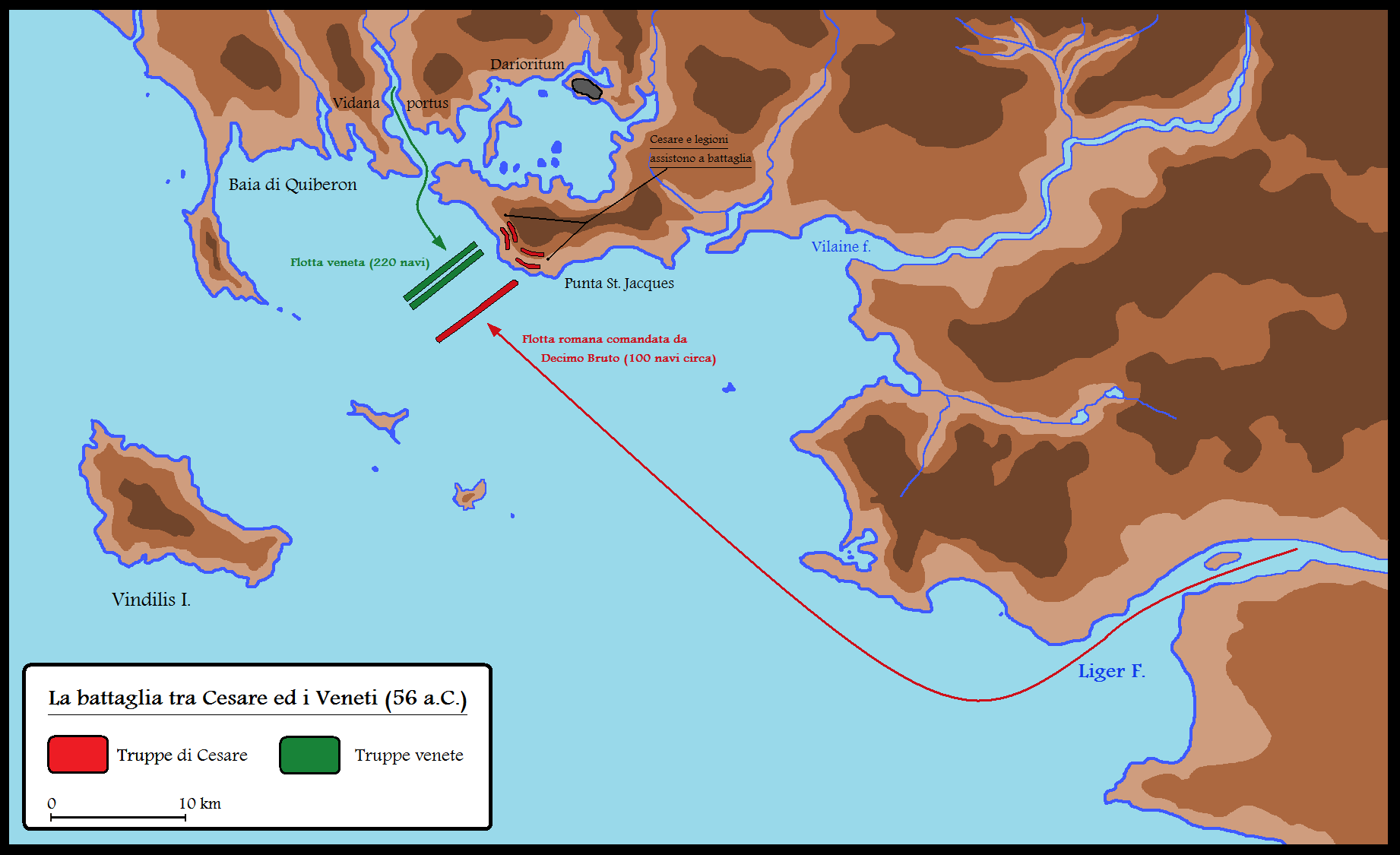
Date	Summer 56 BC
Location	Quiberon Bay, France
Result	Roman victory

Belligerents
Roman Republic	Veneti

Commanders and leaders
Julius Caesar; Decimus Junius Brutus Albinus	

Strength
Unknown	220 ships

Casualties and losses
Light	Almost all ships destroyed or captured

The Battle of Morbihan, also known as the Battle of Quiberon Bay, was a naval battle fought in the summer of 56 BC between the Gallic tribe of the Veneti and a Roman fleet sent by Julius Caesar. The battle was fought off the coast of Brittany in modern-day France, likely near Quiberon Bay. The battle was a part of the Gallic Wars. The battle ended in a decisive Roman victory.

== Background ==
During the winter of 57–56 BC, Publius Crassus was stationed among the Andecavi. Since the Romans were undersupplied, Crassus sent officers to neighboring tribes to procure food and provisions. Quintus Velanius and Titus Silius were sent to the Veneti, where they were detained. The Veneti offered to return Velanius and Silius, if the Romans returned the hostages they had previously given to Crassus. Caesar interpreted these detentions as an act of war. After receiving word in Illyricum from Crassus, Caesar ordered a fleet to be built on the river Loire and rowers and seamen to be recruited. When the Veneti learned that Caesar was headed towards them, they prepared for war by gathering their navy and allying with the nearby Osismii, Lexovii, Namnetes, Ambiliati, Morini, Diablintes, and Menapii. Caesar appointed Decimus Brutus to command the Roman fleet.

The Veneti held the upper hand for much of the campaign. Their ships were well-suited to the region, and when their hill forts were under siege, they could simply evacuate them by sea. Despite having the superior army and great siege equipment, the Romans were making little progress. Caesar realized that the campaign could not be won on land and halted the campaign until the Roman fleet was complete. The fleet was complete near the end of the summer of 56 BC.

== Battle ==
The Roman fleet met the Veneti fleet around Quiberon Bay. The Veneti fleet had around 220 ships. Caesar and the Roman army overlooked the battle from cliffs nearby, possibly in modern-day Saint-Gildas-de-Rhuys. The battle occurred close to shore allowing Caesar and his soldiers to watch and encourage the Roman fleet. The Venetic ships were designed for the open ocean of the Atlantic and so were much larger than the Roman ships adapted to the Mediterranean Sea. Merely the stern of the Venetic ship surpassed the height of the Roman ships, even when equipped with turrets. The Venetic ships were made out of sturdy oak and used sails made of leather to survive ocean-storm weather. Venetic ships were powered entirely by sails as opposed to Roman ships primarily powered by rowers. The Venetic ships were too large and sturdy to ram and so the Romans devised a different plan.

The Romans attached hooks to the end of wooden poles on their ships. During the engagement, Roman ships positioned next to the Venetic ships until the hooks would catch the Veneti's halyards that held the yard to the mast. Once the hook caught, the Romans rowed fast ahead so the halyard was cut causing the yard and sail to drop. With their sails disabled, the Venetic ships were rendered immobile leaving them vulnerable to encirclement by two or three Roman vessels, which boarded and overpowered the Veneti.

The remaining uncaptured ships saw the Roman tactics and began to flee. Soon after the retreat began, the wind stopped and the remaining Venetic ships were stuck in place since they lacked rowers. The attempted flight caused the Venetic ships to become dispersed and unable to help one another. The Romans continued to board the Venetic ships as they had before the flight. Almost all Venetic ships were captured or destroyed using these tactics. The battle lasted from around 10 o-clock in the morning until sunset. Only a few remaining Venetic ships escaped under cover of night.

== Aftermath ==
The surviving Veneti surrendered to Julius Caesar following the Battle of Morbihan. Julius Caesar had all members of the Veneti's ruling senate put to death and sold the rest of the population into slavery. The severity of the punishment was most likely intended to make an example of the Veneti for seizing Roman ambassadors and deter any further uprisings in Gaul.

Caesar later used the fleet built for the Battle of Morbihan in his invasions of Britain.

== Historiography ==
Similar to many events within the Gallic Wars, Commentarii de Bello Gallico by Julius Caesar is the only primary source documenting the events of the Battle of Morbihan. Unexplained within Caesar's account is the delay in constructing the fleet. The fleet took around nine months to prepare, longer than the standard time for fleet construction at the time.

Later historians have criticized the cruelty Caesar treated the Veneti to following the battle. Napoleon, in his commentaries on the wars of Julius Caesar, says "this conduct was not just; still less was it politic. Such means never achieve their aim; they anger and disgust the nations. The punishment of a few chief people is all that justice and policy permit; it is an important rule to treat prisoners well." Several historians argue that this punishment among other actions against the Gauls satisfy the modern definition of genocide.
