= Ambiliati =

Ancient Gallic tribe

The Ambiliati or Ambilatri were an ancient Gallic tribe living in the southern part of Armorica during the Iron Age and the Roman period. It is attested that they occupied a territory covering that which equals to most of the Vendée and the southern part of Loire-Atlantique south of the Loire river. Taking this into consideration, the Ambiliati were the neighbours of the Pictones to the east and the Anagnutes and Namnetes to the north.

== Name ==
They are attested as Ambiliati by Caesar (mid-1st c. BC) and refer to the same people as the Ambilatri mentioned by Pliny (1st c. AD).

The Gaulish prefix ambi- in their name reflects a location on both sides of a river, in this case being the Sèvre Nantaise.

Venceslas Kruta suggests to identify them to the Ambibarii, although Julie Rémy notes there is no real evidence to support this proposal, apart from the fact that in both cases the names are associated with Armorican peoples.

== Geography ==
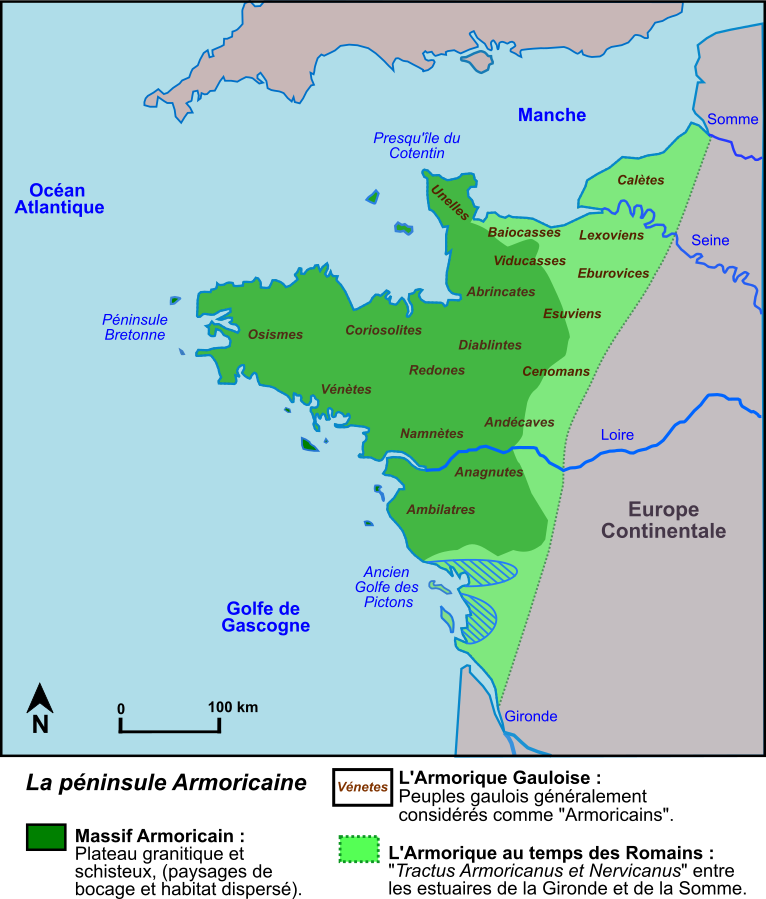
Location of the Ambiliati (Ambilatres) in Armorica

Caesar's account seems to imply that the Ambiliati lived near the coastline. Pliny mentions the Ambilatri as living in Gallia Aquitania.

Modern scholarship, following Pierre-Marie Duval and Jean Hiernard, identifies the Ambiliati and Ambilatri as a single tribe occupying a territory located on both sides of the Sèvre Nantaise, particularly the Vendée (apart from the Marais Poitevin), the Pays de Retz in Loire-Atlantique and probably the Choletais region, though it is important not to ignore the Anagnutes who are attested to have lived in the Mauges. Hiernard's hypothesis for the placement of the Ambiliati territory west of the Pictones and south of the Loire river is supported by the presence of an equoranda-type toponym in Vendée and by the distribution patterns of Picton and Armorican coinage in the greater Poitou region.

== History ==
During the Gallic Wars (58–50 BC), the Ambiliati are listed among the Armorican allies of the Veneti against Caesar.

The circumstances and date of their attachment to the civitas of the Pictones remain uncertain. They may have been incorporated into Picton territory as early as the Augustan period, possibly as a reward for Picton support at the end of the Gallic Wars, or initially attached to the Andecavi and later separated from their civitas following the revolt of 21 AD. In any case, this administrative boundary was significant in that it initially separated two Roman provinces (Gallia Aquitania and Gallia Lugdunensis) and, after the reform of Diocletianic Reforms, two dioceses (Dioecesis Galliarum and Dioecesis Viennensis). By at least the aftermath of the revolt of 21, it had detached the Mauges region (pagus Medalgicus) of the Ambiliati from the city of Iuliomagus (modern Angers).
