= Rezé =

Reze Rezae (Gallo) Reudied (Breton)
- Commune
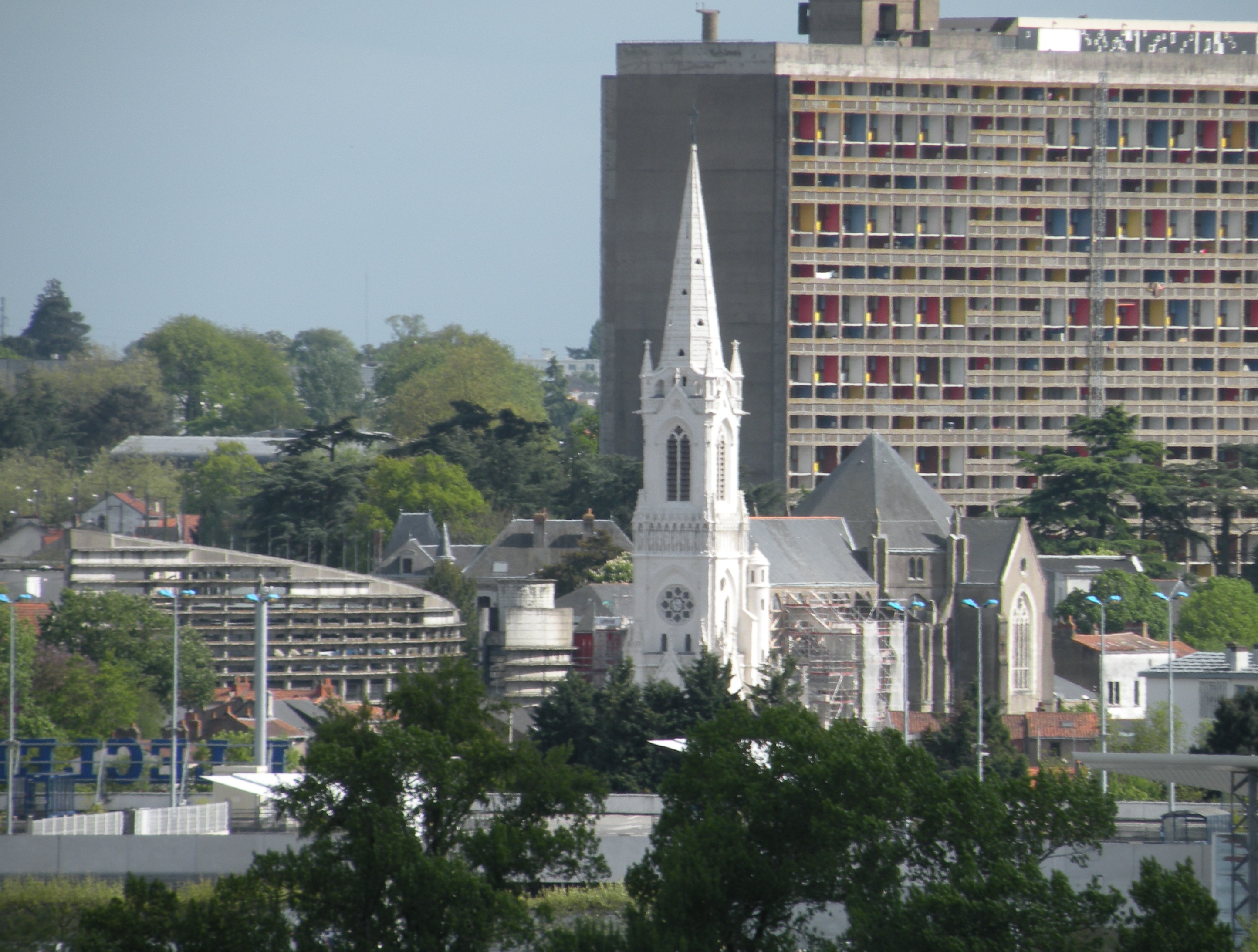
- City center

- Flag Coat of arms
- Location of Reze
- Location within France Location within Pays de la Loire
- Coordinates: 47°11′30″N 1°34′10″W
- Country: France
- Region: Pays de la Loire
- Department: Loire-Atlantique
- Arrondissement: Nantes
- Canton: Rezé-1 and 2
- Intercommunality: Nantes Métropole

Government
  - Mayor (2022–2026): Agnès Bourgeais
- Area^{1}: 13.78 km^{2} (5.32 sq mi)
- Elevation: 8 m (26 ft)
- Highest elevation: 42 m (138 ft)
- Lowest elevation: 1 m (3.3 ft)
- Population (2023): 43,556
  - Density: 3,161/km^{2} (8,186/sq mi)
- Time zone: UTC+01:00 (CET)
  - Summer (DST): UTC+02:00 (CEST)
- INSEE/Postal code: 44143 /44400
- ^{1} French Land Register data, which excludes lakes, ponds, glaciers > 1 km^{2} (0.386 sq mi or 247 acres) and river estuaries.

Rezé (French: [ʁəze]; Breton: Reudied, Gallo: Rezae) is a commune (municipality) and former bishopric in the Loire-Atlantique department in the Pays de la Loire region of western France. It is a southern suburb of Nantes.

It was also called Ratiate in the Middle Ages and Rezay in the High Middle Ages.

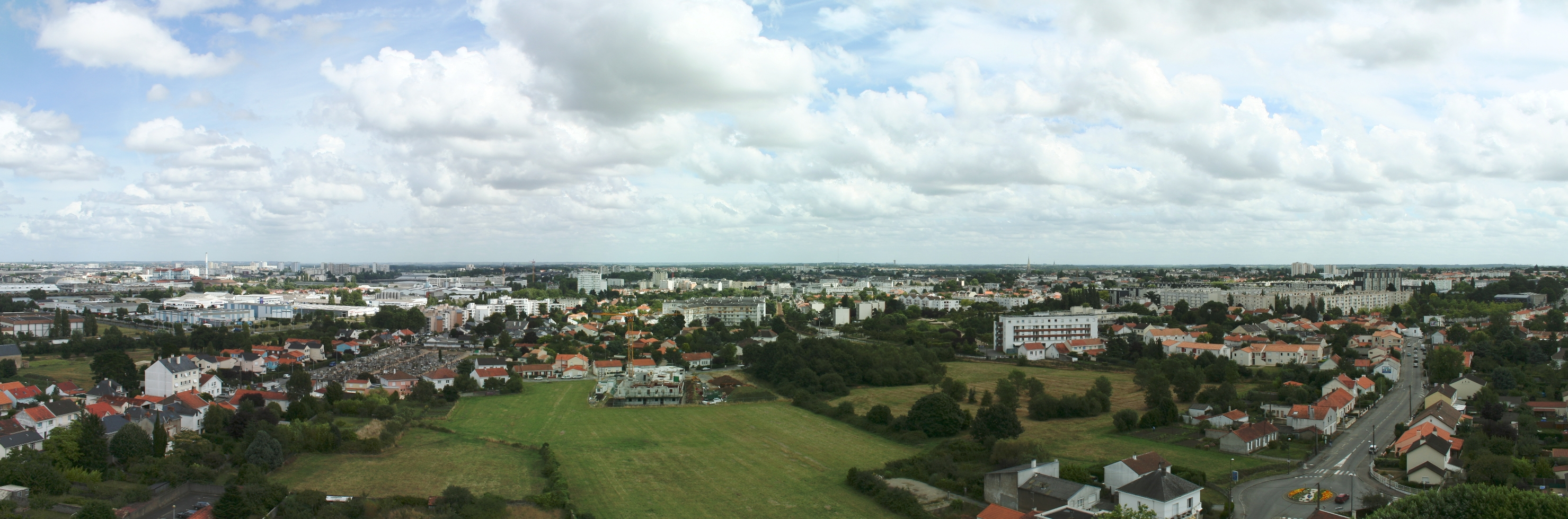
View of Rezé from the Maison Radieuse of Corbusier

== History ==
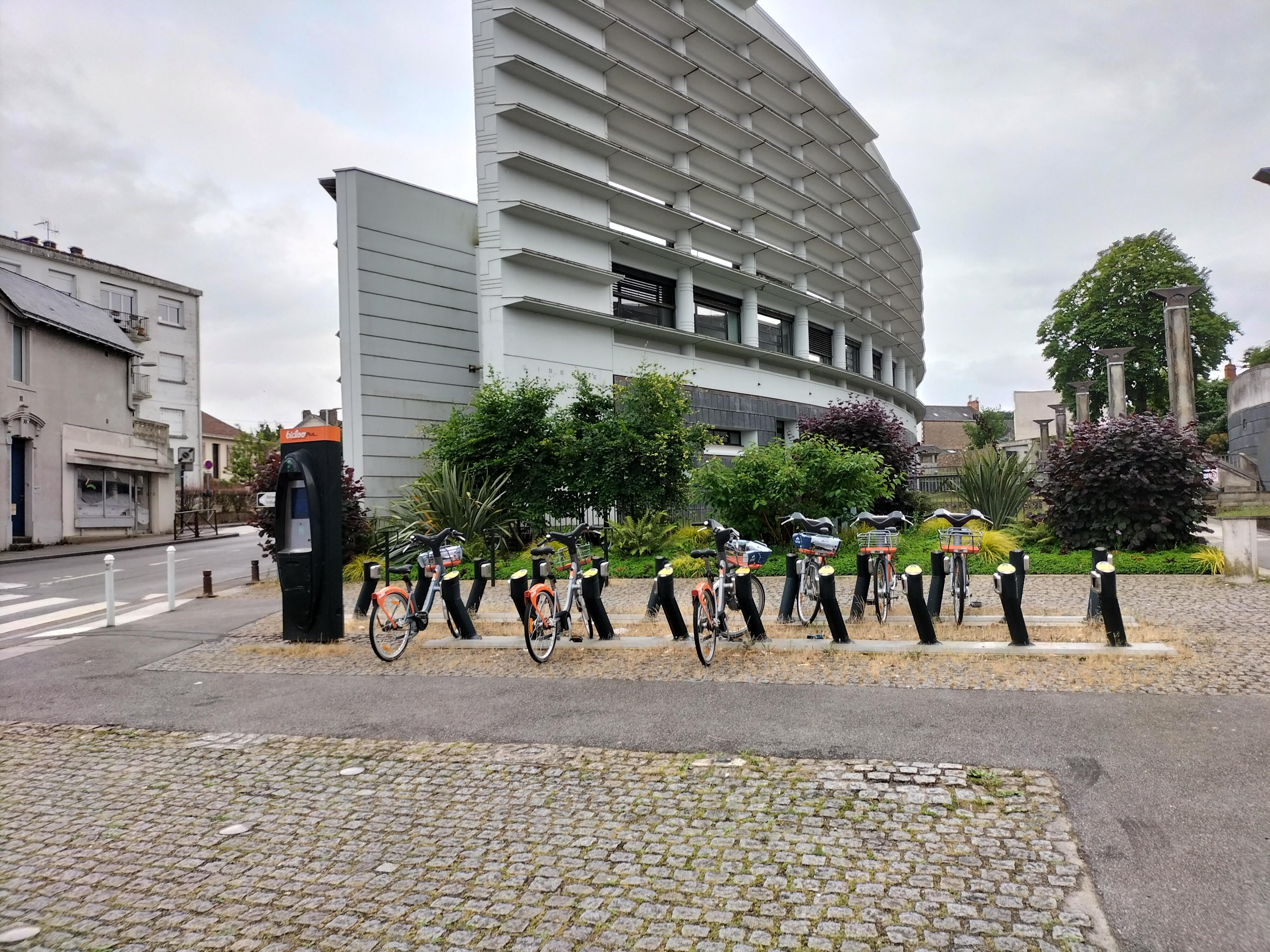
The Hôtel de Ville

Rezé dates back to the Roman era, when it was known as Portus Ratiatus (port of Rezé) and Ratiatum Pictonum Portus (Picton port of Rezé). Being populated by the Ambilatres tribe, whose location on the south bank of the lower Loire is not established with certainty, between Armorica and Celtica Gaul.

Rezé was an important port on the south shore of the Loire, established opposite the port of Namnetes, located north of the Loire, Nantes - Contigwic of its Gaulish name - and it is experiencing rapid development, which suggests a strong power of attraction, a place for meetings and trade between the various Celtic tribes of the region (Veneti, Namnetes, Ambilatres, Andecavis and of course Pictones).

In 510 a Latin Catholic Diocese of Rezé was established on territory split off from the Diocese of Poitiers. It was suppressed 851, its territory being reassigned to the nearby then Diocese of Nantes. No incumbents or other details available.

It has ruins of Gallo-Roman settlement and a priory of Saint Lucien.

In feudal times, it was the capital of Pays de Retz which means "Land of Rezé" within the Duchy of Brittany, after the invasion of the Bretons.

The Hôtel de Ville was completed in 1989.

== Geography ==
Location of the Rezé commune in the department of Loire-Atlantique

The commune is surrounded by the communes of Nantes, Vertou, Les Sorinières, Pont-Saint-Martin and Bouguenais. It is limited north by the Loire, east by the Sèvre Nantaise and the Ilette, west by the Jaguère and south by the boulevard périphérique of Nantes. Rezé-Pont-Rousseau station has rail connections to Pornic, Saint-Gilles-Croix-de-Vie and Nantes.

== Monuments ==
- Unité d'Habitation of Nantes-Rezé, a monumental apartment building designed by Le Corbusier

== Municipal administration ==
Since the municipal elections of 1977, the communal council has always been filled in the first round of voting.

List of mayors before 1944
Term	Name	Political Party	Position
March 1790-January 1791	Louis Michel Dupré Villaine (1735–1806)	Royalist	
April 1791-December 1792	Pierre François Huard (1755–1814)	Republican	
December 1792-March 1796	Ambroise Alphonse Le Coûteux (1740–1805)	Constitutional	
April 1796-August 1800	Pierre François Huard (1755–1814)	Republican	
August 1800-October 1803	Pierre François Huard (1755–1814)	Republican	
October 1803-August 1807	Jean-Baptiste Ertaud (1763–1840)	Republican	
August 1807-April 1820	Jean François Ertaud (1769–1840)	Governmental	
April 1820-August 1830	Joseph de Monti de Rezé (1766–1850)	Legitimist	
August 1830-November 1844	Pierre Giraud (1789–1844)	Orléanist	General Council
December 1844-March 1848	Joseph Delaville Leroux (1775–1855)	Orléanist	
March 1848-September 1848	Arsène Leloup (1803–1876)	Republican	
September 1848-March 1864	Philémon Chenantais (1805–1883)	Bonapartist	
March 1864-September 1870	Hippolyte Aguesse (1799–1875)	Governmental	
October 1870-October 1875	Hippolyte Aguesse (1799–1875)	Governmental	
October 1875-August 1876	Félix Chauvelon (1825–1888)	Republican	
October 1876-May 1878	Julien Albert (1807–1878)	Republican	
May 1878-January 1890	Joseph Raphaël Lancelot (1832–1890)	Republican	
March 1890-May 1896	Georges Grignon Dumoulin (1845–1904)	Republican	
May 1896-May 1908	Ernest Sauvestre (1849–1932)	Radical Republican	
May 1908-May 1929	Jean Baptiste Vigier (1863–1940)	Republican	Conseiller d'arrondissement
May 1929-May 1935	Charles Rivière (1870–1947)	Radical Socialist	
May 1935-December 1936	Léon Taugeron (1886–1961)	Radical Socialist	
December 1936-March 1941	Jean Vignais (1878–1954)	Radical Socialist	
March 1941-September 1944	Alexandre Le Lamer (1873–1950)	Right	
Sources: Yann Vince, "Rezé, histoire municipale" éditions Hérault, 1997

List of mayors after 1944
Term	Name	Political Party	Position
September 1944-May 1945	Jean Vignais (1878–1954)	Radical Socialist	
May 1945-March 1949	Arthur Boutin (1903–1980)	SFIO	General Council
March 1949-March 1959	Georges Albert Bénezet (1892–1970)	RPF	
March 1959-February 1978	Alexandre Plancher (1909–1978)	SFIO	General Council
April 1978-February 1999	Jacques Floch (1938- )	PS	Deputy
1999–2014	Gilles Retière	PS	
2014–2020	Gérard Allard	PS	
2020–2022	Hervé Neau	DVG	
2022–incumbent	Agnès Bourgeais		
Sources: Yann Vince, "Rezé, histoire municipale" éditions Hérault, 1997

== Population ==
Historical population

Year	Pop.	±% p.a.
1793	4,466	—
1800	3,519	−3.35%
1806	4,989	+5.99%
1821	4,756	−0.32%
1831	4,968	+0.44%
1841	5,277	+0.61%
1846	6,203	+3.29%
1851	6,644	+1.38%
1856	7,054	+1.20%
1861	7,209	+0.44%
1866	7,423	+0.59%
1872	6,946	−1.10%
1876	6,849	−0.35%
1881	7,377	+1.50%
1886	7,418	+0.11%
1891	7,431	+0.04%
1896	7,803	+0.98%
1901	8,751	+2.32%

Year	Pop.	±% p.a.
1906	8,919	+0.38%
1911	9,424	+1.11%
1921	10,368	+0.96%
1926	11,050	+1.28%
1931	12,325	+2.21%
1936	13,499	+1.84%
1946	16,395	+1.96%
1954	19,000	+1.86%
1962	28,276	+5.10%
1968	33,509	+2.87%
1975	35,730	+0.92%
1982	33,562	−0.89%
1990	33,262	−0.11%
1999	35,478	+0.72%
2007	37,846	+0.81%
2012	39,377	+0.80%
2017	41,411	+1.01%
2023	43,556	+0.85%

Source: EHESS and INSEE

== Twin towns – sister cities ==
Rezé is twinned with:

- Sankt Wendel, Germany, since 1973
- Aïn Defla, Algeria, since 1985
- (Republic of Ireland) Dundalk, Ireland, since 1990
- Villa El Salvador, Peru, since 1991
- Ineu, Romania, since 2003
- Ronkh, Senegal, since 2003

In addition to its twin towns, Rezé cooperates with Abu Dis in Palestine (since 2007).

== See also ==
- Communes of the Loire-Atlantique department
- List of Catholic dioceses in France
