= Turoni =

Gallic tribe

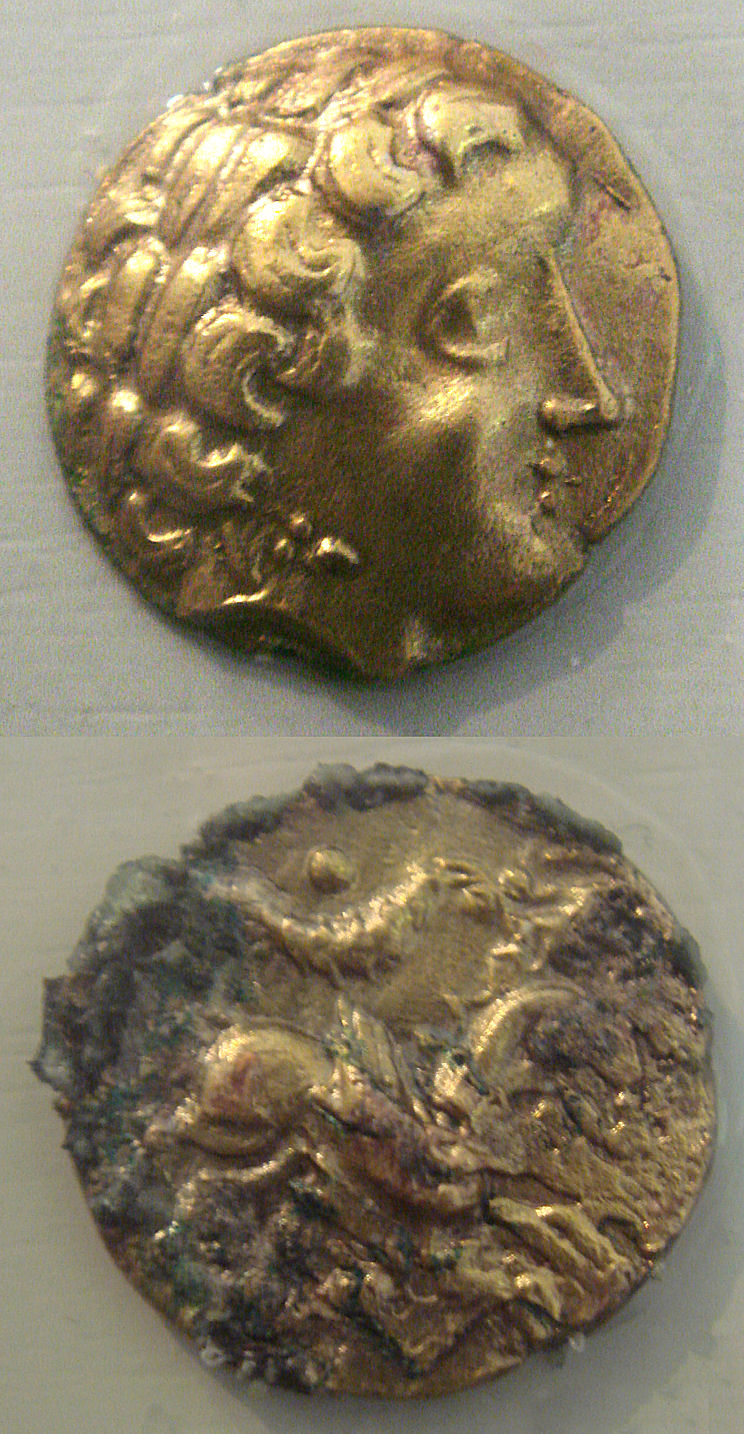
Turones coinage, 5th–1st century BCE

The Turoni or Turones were a Gallic tribe of dwelling in the later Touraine region during the Iron Age and the Roman period.

They were among the first tribes to give support to the Gallic coalition against Rome led by Vercingetorix in 52 BC, then to the revolt of Sacrovir in 21 AD.

== Name ==
They are mentioned as Turonos and Turonis by Caesar (mid-1st c. BC), Turones by Pliny (1st c. AD), Turoni by Tacitus (early 2nd c. AD), and as Touroúpioi (Τουρούπιοι, var. τουρογιεῖς) by Ptolemy (2nd c. AD).

The etymology of Turoni is uncertain. Pierre-Yves Lambert has proposed to see an altered form of Proto-Indo-European *tauro- ('bull'), but Alexander Falileyev finds it unlikely.

A folk etymology that the Turoni were named after Turnus from the Aeneid appears in the Historia Brittonum: "[Brutus of Britain] was exiled on account of the death of Turnus, slain by Aeneas. He then went among the Gauls and built a city of the Turones, called Turnis [Tours]". Geoffrey of Monmouth later expanded this story in the Historia Regum Britanniae, where Tours was named after Brutus' nephew, also called Turnus, who had died fighting against Goffar the Pictone, king of Aquitaine.

The city of Tours, attested in the 6th c. AD as apud Toronos (in civitate Turonus in 976, Turonis in 1205, Tors in 1266), and the Touraine region, attested in 774 as Turonice civitatis (in pago Turonico in 983, vicecomes Turanie in 1195–96, Touraine in 1220), are named after the Gallic tribe.

== Geography ==
Civitas of the Turones (red) during the Roman period, compared to the modern Indre-et-Loire department (green).

The Turoni on the middle reaches of the Loire river. Their territory was located south of the Cenomani, east of the Andecavi and the Pictones.

The oppidum des Châtelliers at Ambacia (modern Amboise) was a major settlement that replaced the earlier principal oppidum at the end of the La Tène period. Archaeological and numismatic evidence suggests that Ambacia was the chief town of the Turones in the late Iron Age, possibly serving as their civitas capital until the Augustan period, before the foundation of Caesarodunum.

During the Roman era, their chief town became Caesarodunum (modern Tours). The settlement is first mentioned in the early 2nd century AD by Ptolemy. During the early Roman period, it held the status of a free city, and in Late Antiquity it became the capital of the province of Lugdunensis Tertia.
