= Anagnutes =

Ancient Gallic tribe

The Anagnutes were an ancient Gallic tribe living in Gallia Aquitania during the Iron Age and the Roman period.

== Name ==
They are mentioned as Anagnutes by Pliny (1st c. AD), and as Agnōtēs (Ἀγνῶτες) by Artemidorus (1st c. BC), cited by Hermolaus in his summary of the Ethnica of Stephanus of Byzantium.

According Xavier Delamarre, Anagnutes may be a Celtic compound reconstructed as *ana-gnūt-es, possibly combining the stem *ana- (an obscure element that may mean 'marsh'), with *-gnut- ('one who knows'). On this basis, he proposes the interpretation 'those who know the marshes'.

== Geography ==
In the 1st century AD, they are cited by Pliny as living in Gallia Aquitania, along with the Ambilatri and Pictones.

Their exact location remains uncertain. One hypothesis places them in the region of Aunis (modern Charente-Maritime).

Like the Ambilatri, they may have been a pagus of the Pictones. Their incorporation into Picton territory may have occurred as early as the Augustan period, possibly as a reward for Picton support in 56 BC during the Gallic Wars.
