= Dagana =

Dagana may refer to:

- Dagana, Senegal a town
- Dagana Department, Senegal
- Dagana River, Senegal
- Dagana Department, Chad
- Dagana District, Bhutan
