= Goffar the Pict =

Legendary king in ancient France

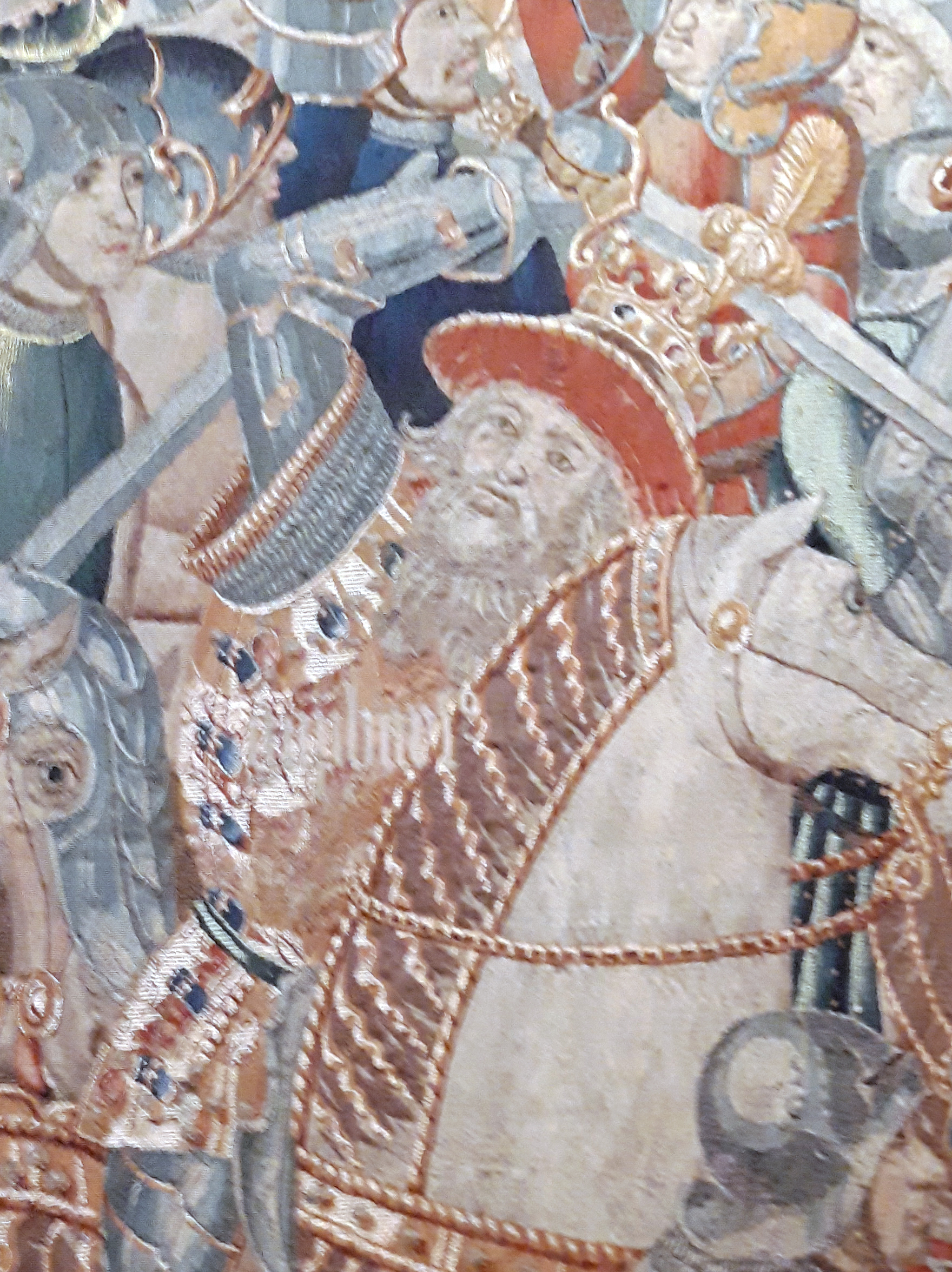
Goffar in a c. 1475 tapestry now in the Cathedral of the Savior of Zaragoza's museum

Goffar (Latin: Goffarius Pictus) known as Goffar the Pict, was a pseudo-historical king of Aquitaine around the year 1000 BCE in Geoffrey of Monmouth's Historia Regum Britanniae (c. 1136). In the story, he was defeated by Brutus of Troy and Corineus on their way to Britain. Later histories of Britain and France included Goffar from Historia Regum Britanniae, and sometimes expanded the story with additional details.

== Historia Regum Britanniae ==
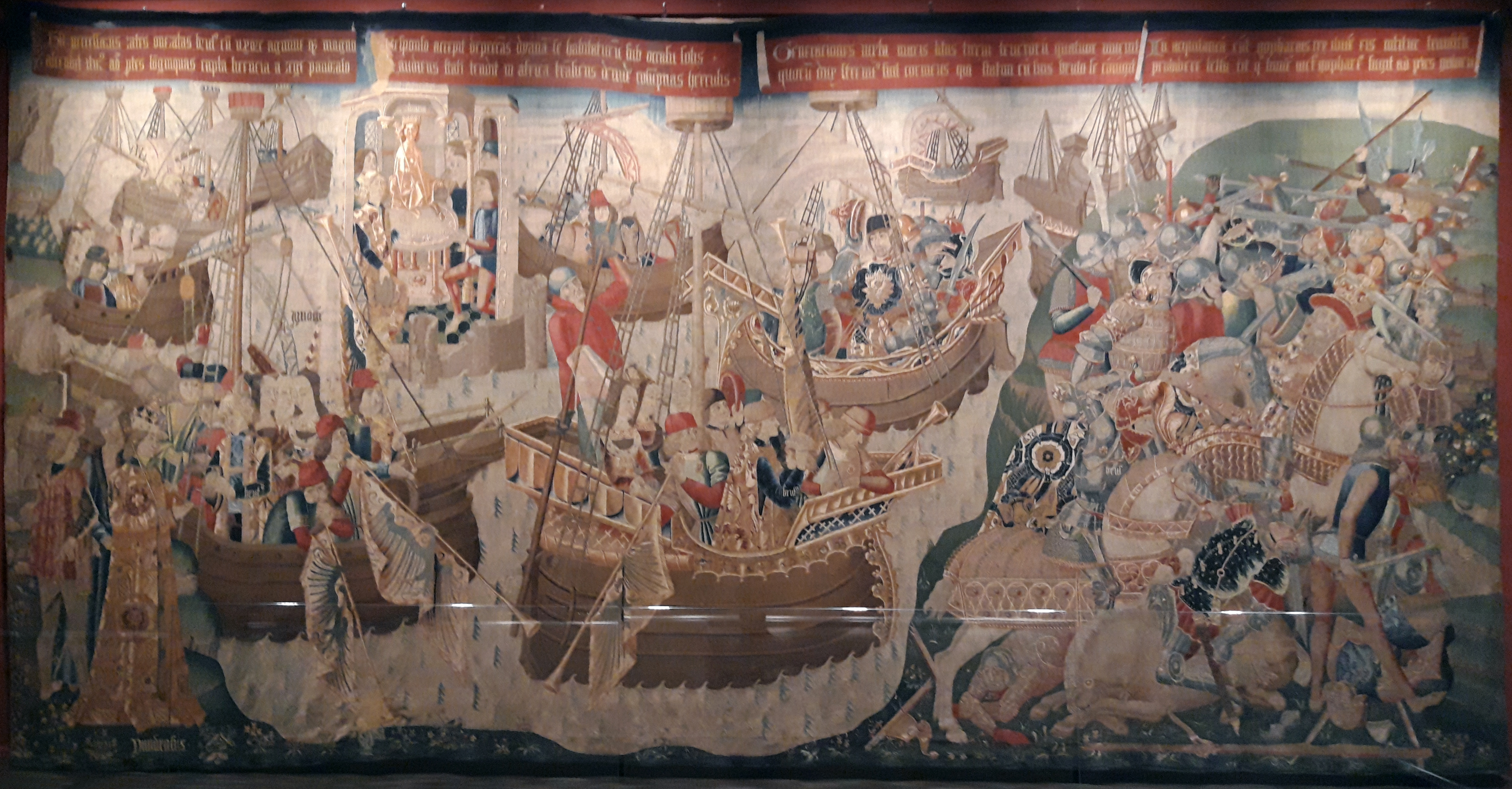
Complete tapestry of "Brutus' expedition to Aquitaine", with Goffar on the right

In the myths surrounding Brutus of Troy's occupation of Britain, Goffar led the Poitevins to war against Brutus' fleet. Although he sent messengers under a certain Himbert first, they got in a fight with Corineus, Brutus' general, over royal property and all of the messengers were brutally killed.

After a battle at the mouth of the Loire, the Trojans marched up the Loire through Goffar's dominions until they reached the territory of the Turones. There a battle was fought against troops given to Goffar by the eleven other kings of Gaul, and won, founding the city of Tours named in honor of Brutus' nephew Turnus, who died fighting.

Professor Rowland Wymer points out the brutality in this account of Brutus' killing of Goffar's people.

== Sources ==
Geoffrey's main source, the Historia Brittonum, does not mention Goffar, but does contain a passage that he expanded into this story: "[Brutus] was exiled on account of the death of Turnus, slain by Aeneas. He then went among the Gauls and built a city of the Turones, called Turnis [Tours]". The Historia Regum Britanniae instead gives the name Turnus to a nephew of Brutus, and adds the battle with Goffar to explain his death.

Goffar may have been one of the many characters invented by Geoffrey of Monmouth for the Historia Regum Britanniae. However, academic Hans Matter suggested that Geoffrey could have taken the etymological origin story of Tours, and expanded it using traditions about the historical Waiofar of Aquitaine, who is called "Guaifier" in the Chanson de Roland.

== British tradition ==
Wace's Roman de Brut (1155) expands on Monmouth's Historia Regum Britanniae, and includes Goffar (also variously spelled Gofar, Gossac, and Gofiers) as the king of Poitiers. Medievalist Antoine Le Roux de Lincy believed that Wace intended Goffar to be the fifth century king of Burgundy Gunther.

John of Hauville's Architrenius (c. 1184) does not mention Goffar directly, but describes Corineus' massacre of the Aquitanians as "humbling the haughty eloquence of a loquacious people with undaunted arms. A complete and decisive victory, undamaged by the shifting tides of war, untroubled by any reversal and marred by no vacillation of fate".

Layamon's Brut (c. 1190–1215) has Goffar (Goffare in the Otho manuscript version) as the king of Poitou, and gives the name of his messenger as Goffar's steward Numbert the alderman ("Numberd the man" in Otho). It follows the story of Historia Regum Britanniae and Roman de Brut, but has Corineus deny the righteousness of the king's frith (both "peace" and law) which emerges as a form of subjugation instead of protection, and also recasts the killing of Numbert in terms of personal honour and retribution.

Peter Langtoft's Chronicle (written before his death around 1305) has Goffar as "Gofforre" (or Goffre, Goffor, or Goffore), king of "Payters" (Poitiers). It says that Brutus arrived in Aquitaine, which they called "Paytewe" (Poitou) at the time. It gives the name of Subardus as "Suard" (or "Sward"), and Imbertus as Ymbert, who is Goffar's men's "chieftain by common agreement".

John Hardyng's Chronicle (1437) has Goffar as "Goffore" as king of "Aquitayne that Guyen now is" (Guyenne), who fights with Brutus and Corineus hand to hand before retreating to "Gaule ... that now is Fraunce".

Robert Fabyan's Chronicle (written before his death in 1511/1512) includes Goffar as "a Prynce named Copharius" of the province of "Gallia now called Guyan" (Guyenne). It notes that Goffar must have known the language of Brutus, mentions the dissenting view of the Polychronicon that Tours had already been built by this time, and lists the events as having happened in 1136 BCE.

John Rastell's The Pastyme of People (1529) mentions Goffar (under the name "Copharius") as a prince of "Gallia now callyd Guian" (Guyenne), as part of a very condensed version of the Brutus story.

Locrine (1595), a play attributed to Shakespeare, mentions "Goffarius, the arm strong King of Gauls, / And all the borders of great Aquitaine". It gives Goffarius a brother, Gathelus, who had been fought by Corineus.

Richard White of Basingstoke's Comitis Palatini Historiarum Libri (1597) has Goffar as "Gopharius Rex Picthus". He explains that "Pict"/"Pictus" refers to the Pictones of Poitou (not the Picts of Scotland), and harmonises the distance between Aquitaine and the mouth of the river Loire (which he has as being in "Celtic Gaul"), by saying that Brutus travelled to Aquitaine after anchoring there.

Henry Chettle and John Day's lost play, The Conquest of Brute with the First Finding of the Bath (1598) has Goffarius, a Gaulish ruler, who is defeated by the military prowess of Corineus.

== French tradition ==
Alain Bouchart drew on Monmouth's Historia Regum Britanniae for the early part of his 1514 history of Brittany Les Grandes Croniques de Bretaigne. This included Goffar as "Grofarius", the "poictevin" king of Aquitaine, with Brutus arriving where Saint-Nazaire is now and follows the Historia's story closely.

Les Annales d'Aquitaine (1524) of Jean Bouchet includes Goffar as "Groffarius Pictus", the king of Aquitaine, with his duke "Ymbert". It follows the story of Monmouth's Historia Regum Britanniae, which the author cites as the source for Goffar, along with La Mer des histoires and an anonymously written Chronicle from the library of Saint Denis.

La Décoration du Pays et Duché de Touraine (1541) by Thibault Lespleigney also includes Goffar as "Grofarius Pictus". It cites Bouchet's Annales.

== Legacy ==
In Horn et Rimenhild, a twelfth century French version of the story of King Horn, one of the King of Dublin's two sons is called Guffer. William Henry Schofield gives Goffarius Pictus as a potential source of this name.

In the fourteenth century play Generides, the Sultan of Persia is named "Goffore". Frederick James Furnivall's 1865 edition of the play also mistakenly gives "Goffare" as the name of the Sultan's niece.
