= Brutus of Troy =

Legendary first king of Britain

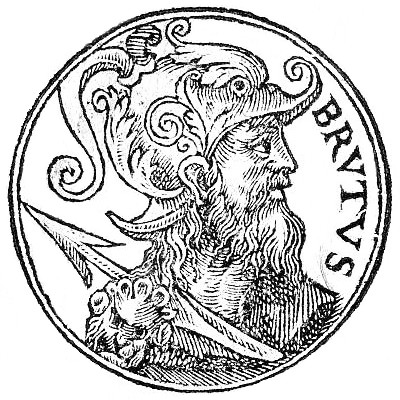

King of Britain
- Predecessor: Position established
- Successor: Locrinus (Loegria); Kamber (Kambria); Albanactus (Albania)
- Spouse: Innogen
- Issue: Locrinus; Kamber; Albanactus
- Father: Silvius
- Mother: Wife of Silvius

Brutus (Ancient Greek: Βροῦτος, romanized: Broûtos), also called Brute of Troy, is a mythical British king. He is described as a descendant of the Trojan hero Aeneas and as the eponymous founder and first king of Britain. This legend first appears in the Historia Brittonum, an anonymous 9th-century historical compilation to which commentary was added by Nennius, but is best known from the account given by the 12th-century chronicler Geoffrey of Monmouth in his Historia Regum Britanniae.

== Historia Brittonum ==
Some have suggested that attributing the origin of 'Britain' to the Latin 'Brutus' may be ultimately derived from Isidore of Seville's popular 7th-century work Etymologiae (c. 560–636), in which it was speculated that the name of Britain derives from bruti, on the basis that the Britons were, in the eyes of that author, brutes, or savages. A more detailed story, set before the foundation of Rome, follows, in which Brutus is the grandson or great grandson of Aeneas – a legend that was perhaps inspired by Isidore's spurious etymology and blends it with the Christian, pseudo-historical, "Frankish Table of Nations" tradition that emerged in the early medieval European scholarly world (actually of 6th-century AD Byzantine origin, and not Frankish, according to historian Walter Goffart) and attempted to trace the peoples of the known world (as well as legendary figures, such as the Trojan house of Aeneas) back to biblical ancestors.

Supposedly following Roman sources such as Livy and Virgil, the Historia tells how Aeneas settled in Italy after the Trojan War, and how his son Ascanius founded Alba Longa, one of the precursors of Rome. Ascanius married, and his wife became pregnant. In a variant version, the father is Silvius, who is identified as either the second son of Aeneas, previously mentioned in the Historia, or as the son of Ascanius. A magician, asked to predict the child's future, said it would be a boy and that he would be the bravest and most beloved in Italy. Enraged, Ascanius had the magician put to death. The mother died in childbirth.

The boy, named Brutus, later accidentally killed his father with an arrow and was banished from Italy. After wandering among the islands of the Tyrrhenian Sea and through Gaul, where he founded the city of Tours, Brutus eventually came to Britain, named it in honour of himself, and filled it with his descendants. His reign is synchronised to the time the High Priest Eli was judge in Israel, and when the Ark of the Covenant was taken by the Philistines.

A variant version of the Historia Brittonum makes Brutus the son of Ascanius's son Silvius, and traces his genealogy back to Ham, son of Noah. Another chapter traces Brutus's genealogy differently, making him the great-grandson of the legendary Roman king Numa Pompilius, who was himself a son of Ascanius, and tracing his descent from Noah's son Japheth. These Christianising traditions conflict with the classical Trojan genealogies, relating the Trojan royal family to Greek gods.

Yet another Brutus, son of Hisicion, son of Alanus the first European, also traced back across many generations to Japheth, is referred to in the Historia Brittonum. This Brutus's brothers were Francus, Alamanus and Romanus, also ancestors of significant European nations.

== Historia Regum Britanniae ==
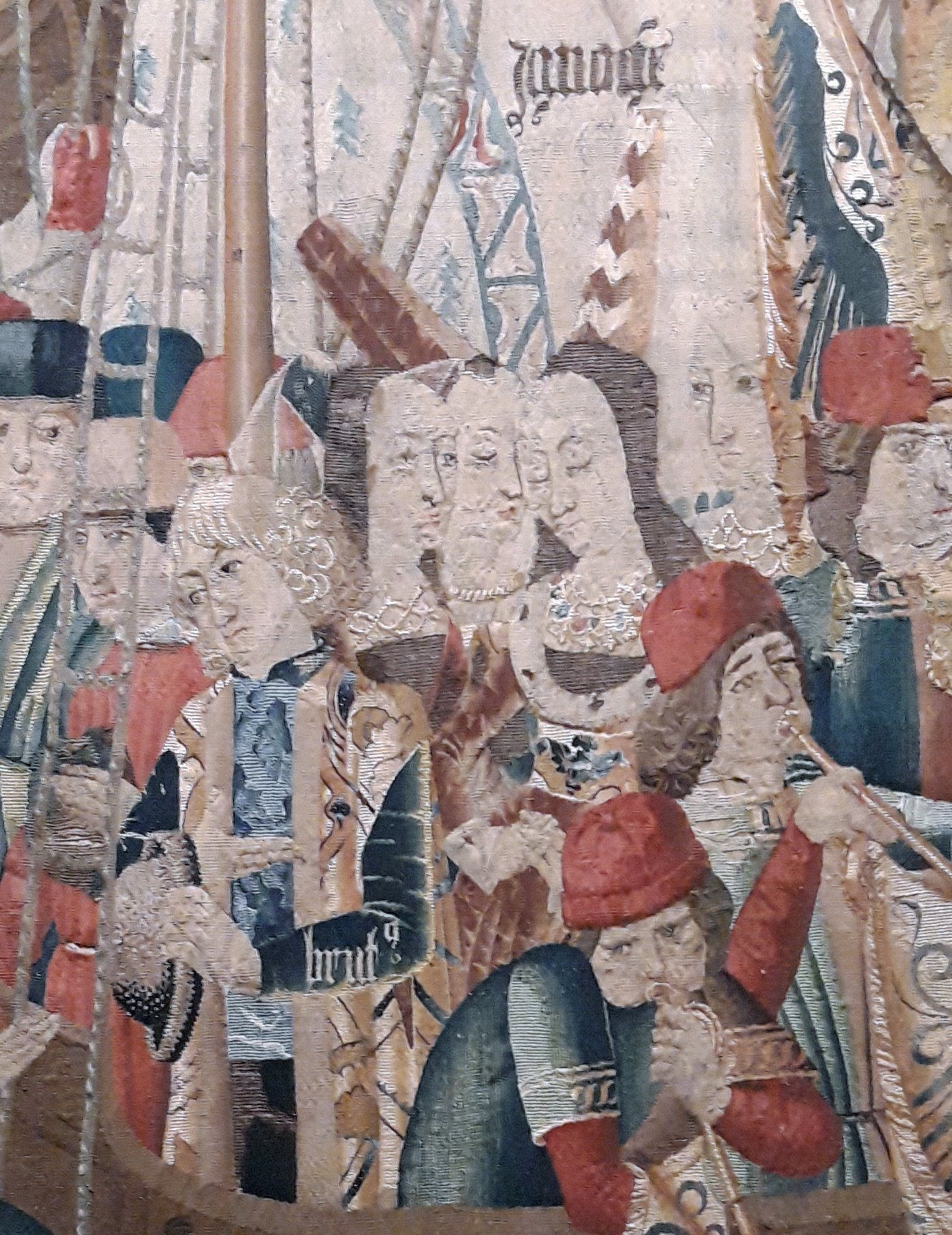
Brutus and Innogen leaving Greece in a c. 1475 tapestry now in the Cathedral of the Savior of Zaragoza

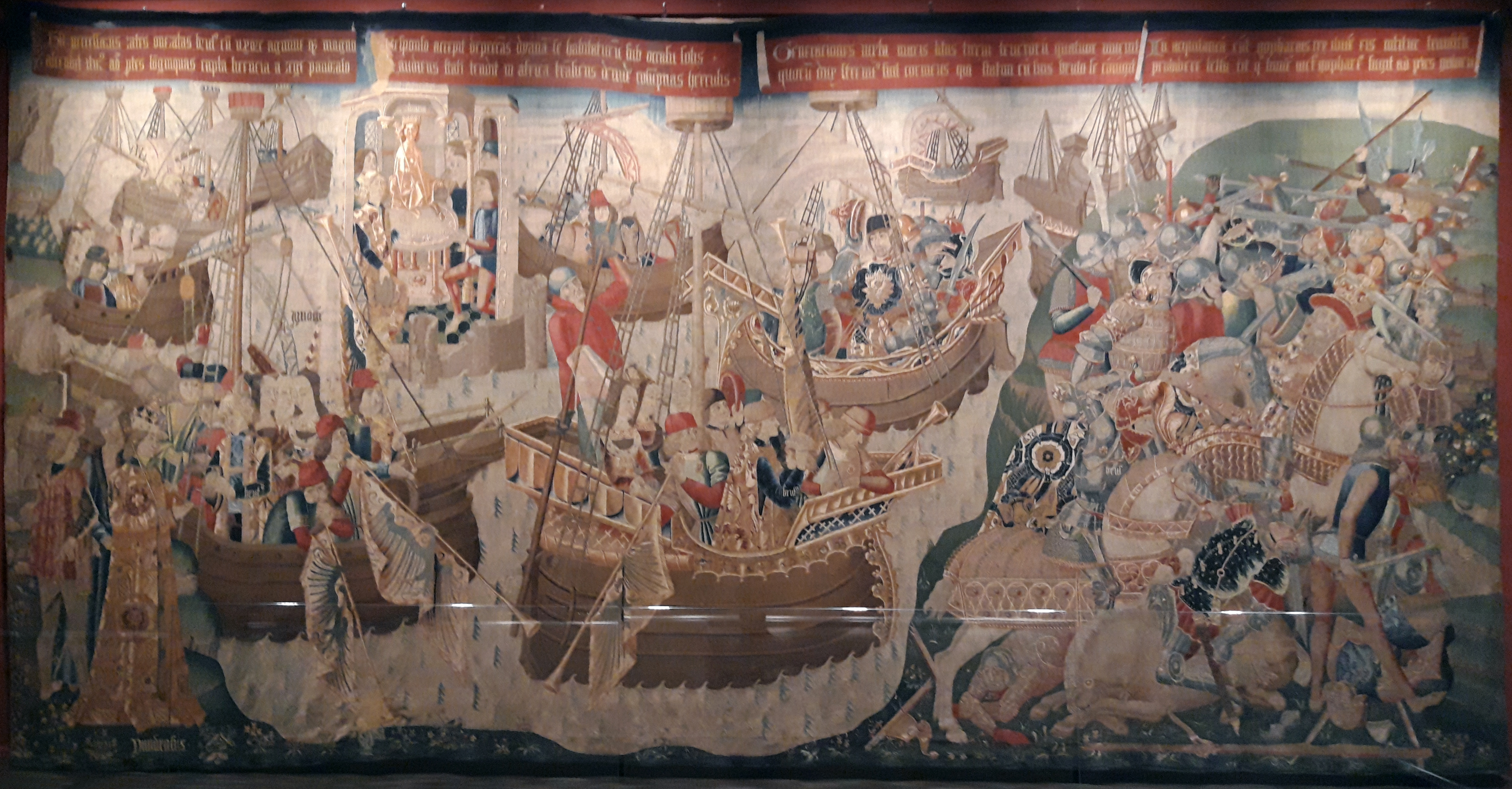
Complete tapestry with Brutus leaving Greece (left), at the temple of Diana (above), sailing to Gaul (centre), and fighting Goffar (right)

Geoffrey of Monmouth's account tells much the same story, but in greater detail. In this version, Brutus is explicitly the grandson, rather than son, of Ascanius; his father is Ascanius' son Silvius. The magician who predicts great things for the unborn Brutus also foretells he will kill both his parents. He does so, in the same manner described in the Historia Brittonum, and is banished. Travelling to Greece, he discovers a group of Trojans enslaved there. He becomes their leader, and after a series of battles they defeat the Greek king Pandrasus by attacking his camp at night after capturing the guards. He takes him hostage and forces him to let his people go. He is given Pandrasus's daughter Ignoge or Innogen in marriage, and ships and provisions for the voyage, and sets sail.

The Trojans land on a deserted island and discover an abandoned temple to Diana. After performing the appropriate ritual, Brutus falls asleep in front of the goddess's statue and is given a vision of the land where he is destined to settle, an island in the western ocean inhabited only by a few giants.

After some adventures in north Africa and a close encounter with the Sirens, Brutus discovers another group of exiled Trojans living on the shores of the Tyrrhenian Sea, led by the prodigious warrior Corineus. In Gaul, Corineus provokes a war with Goffarius Pictus, king of Aquitaine, after hunting in the king's forests without permission. Brutus's nephew Turonus dies in the fighting, and the city of Tours is founded where he is buried. The Trojans win most of their battles but are conscious that the Gauls have the advantage of numbers, so go back to their ships and sail for Britain, then called Albion. They land on "Totonesium litus"—"the sea-coast of Totnes". They meet the giant descendants of Alebion and defeat them.

Brutus renames the island after himself and becomes its first king. Corineus becomes ruler of Cornwall, which is named after him. They are harassed by the giants during a festival, but kill all of them but their leader, the largest giant Goemagot, who is saved for a wrestling match against Corineus. Corineus throws him over a cliff to his death. Brutus then founds a city on the banks of the River Thames, which he calls Troia Nova, or New Troy. The name is in time corrupted to Trinovantum, and the city is later called London. He creates laws for his people and rules for twenty-four years. After his death he is buried in Trinovantum, and the island is divided between his three sons: Locrinus (England), Albanactus (Scotland) and Kamber (Wales).

== Legacy ==
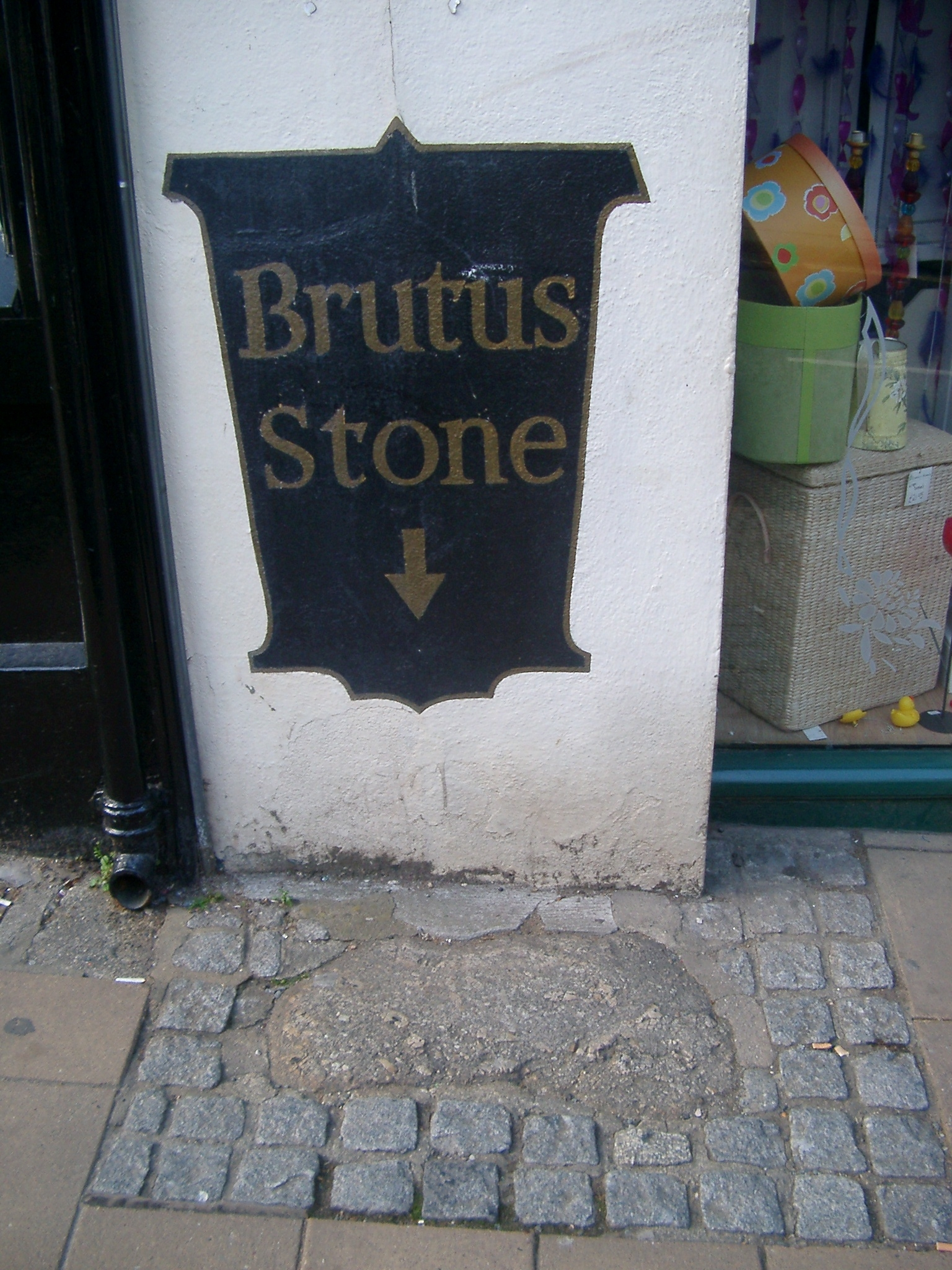
The Brutus Stone in Totnes

Early translations and adaptations of Geoffrey's Historia, such as Wace's Norman French Roman de Brut, Layamon's Middle English Brut, were named after Brutus, and the word brut came to mean a chronicle of British history. One of several Middle Welsh adaptations was called the Brut y Brenhinedd ("Chronicle of the Kings"). Brut y Tywysogion ("Chronicle of the Princes"), a major chronicle for the Welsh rulers from the 7th century to loss of independence, is a purely historical work containing no legendary material but the title reflects the influence of Geoffrey's work and, in one sense, can be seen as a "sequel" to it.

Early chroniclers of Britain, such as Alfred of Beverley, Nicholas Trivet and Giraldus Cambrensis began their histories of Britain with Brutus. The foundation myth of Brutus having settled in Britain was still considered as genuine history during the Early Modern Period, for example Holinshed's Chronicles (1577) considers the Brutus myth to be factual. It was not until the twentieth century that archaeologists were able to prove conclusively that London was founded in 43 AD.

Tudor armorials present Brutus's attributed arms as quarterly: 1st and 4th Or, a lion passant guardant Gules, 2nd and 3rd Azure, three crowns in bend Or.

Modeled after the story of Aeneas and Dido, Brutus was the subject of a 1678 play by Nahum Tate called Brutus of Alba. Elements of the play inspired the later 1696 opera of the same name.

The 18th-century English poet Hildebrand Jacob wrote an epic poem, Brutus the Trojan, Founder of the British Empire, about him, following in the tradition of Virgil's fictitious Roman foundation epic the Aeneid, left unfinished at Virgil's death in 19 BC. Alexander Pope likewise planned a 4-book epic about Brutus, but only ended up writing the first 8 lines. A full synopsis of Pope's epic was published by Owen Ruffhead. In 1801, John Ogilvie published an epic poem in 20 books called Britannia, concerning Brutus' arrival to Britain and first conflicts.

Geoffrey's Historia says that Brutus and his followers landed at Totnes in Devon. A stone on Fore Street in Totnes, known as the "Brutus Stone", commemorates this imaginary event.

In 2021, the Totnes community radio station Soundart Radio commissioned a radio drama adaptation of the Brutus myth by the writer Will Kemp.

The Dartington Morris perform a Mummers play entitled 'Bold Brutus' annually in Totnes in celebration of the foundation of the town.

== Notes ==
Legendary titles
First	King of Britain	Succeeded by Locrinus (Loegria); Kamber (Kambria); Albanactus (Albania)
