= Unité d'Habitation of Nantes-Rezé =

Coordinates: 47.1887°N 1.5683°W

Unité d'habitation of Nantes-Rezé

The Unité d'habitation of Nantes-Rezé is an apartment building located in Rezé, a suburb of Nantes, France designed by Le Corbusier. It contains 294 units, and was completed in 1955. It is part of the housing concept of Unité d'habitation. The building contains a school at the top level, but unlike the Unité d'habitation of Marseille, it does not contain a retail level. It has been listed as a monument historique since 2001. The building was designed to sit in the landscape of water and trees without any loss of agricultural land. The building itself is located in the pond full of water and ducks because of use of the pilotis that lift a building above water.
