= Hôtel de Ville, Rezé =

Town hall in Rezé, France

Hôtel de Ville
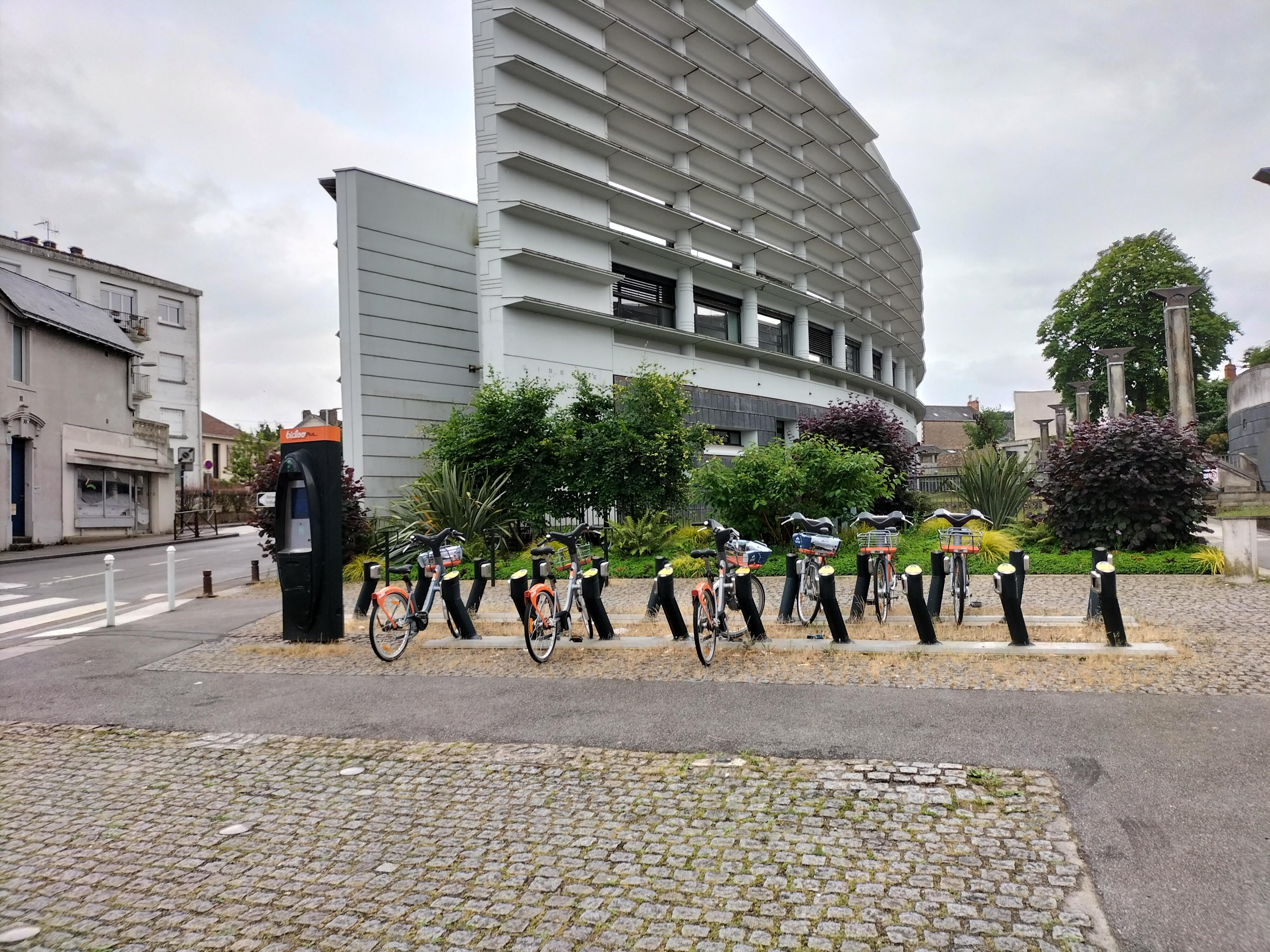
- The curved frontage of the Hôtel de Ville in June 2025
- Interactive map of the Hôtel de Ville area

General information
- Type: City hall
- Architectural style: Postmodern style
- Location: Rezé, France
- Coordinates: 47.1906°N 1.5691°W
- Completed: 1989

Design and construction
- Architect: Alessandro Anselmi

The Hôtel de Ville (French pronunciation: [otɛl də vil], City Hall) is a municipal building in Rezé, Loire-Atlantique, in western France, standing on Place Jean Baptiste Daviais.

== History ==
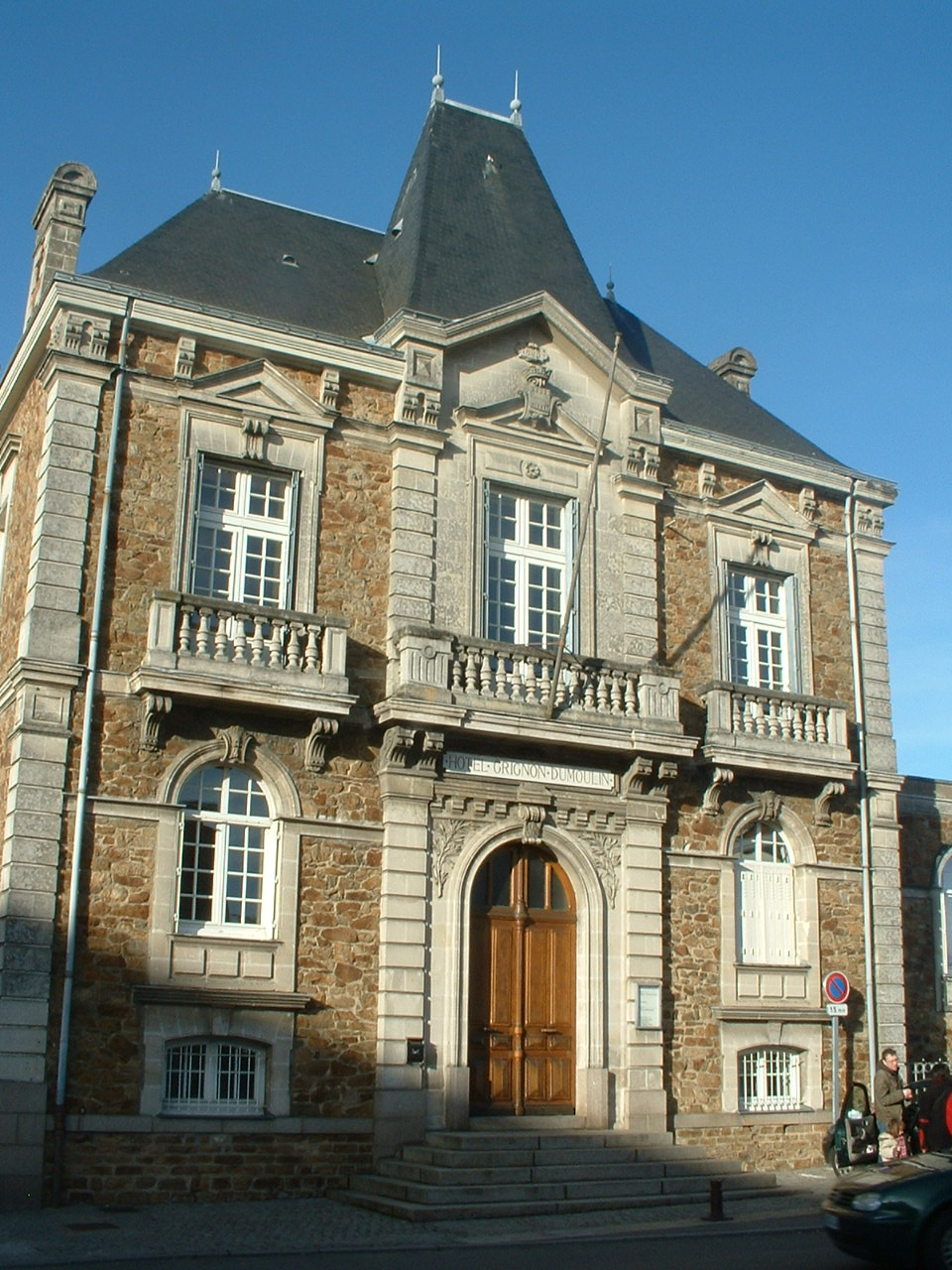
The third town hall

Following the French Revolution, the new town council initially met at the home of the mayor at the time. This arrangement continued until the first town hall was erected on the south side of Rue Georges Grille, to a design by Sieur Guillemet, in 1838. After the site occupied by the first town hall was required for expansion of the local school, the council decided to erect a second town hall on the site of an old cemetery to the east of the Church of Saint-Pierre in 1858. (Note: The site of the first town hall is now occupied by École Primaire Publique Yvonne et Alexandre Plancher, while the site of the second town hall is now occupied by part of the current town hall.)

In the late 19th century, after the second town hall became dilapidated, the council, led by the mayor, Georges Grignon Dumoulin, decided to commission a third town hall. The site they selected was on the north side of Rue Jean Louis. The building was designed by Sieur Bassy in the neoclassical style, built in rubble masonry with stone dressings, and was completed in 1895. The design involved a symmetrical main frontage of three bays facing onto Rue Jean Louis. The central bay, which was clad in stone, featured a short flight of steps leading up to a round headed doorway with a moulded surround and a keystone. On the first floor, there was a French door with a balustraded balcony, a hood mould and a pediment. At roof level, there was a steep châteauesque-style roof above the central bay. The outer bays were fenestrated by round headed windows on the ground floor and by casement windows with hood moulds and pediments on the first floor. The building was later renamed Hôtel Grignon-Dumoulin after the former mayor.

Following the liberation of the town on 29 August 1944, during the Second World War, the mayor, Alexandre Le Lamer, and other members of the council held a ceremony the following morning during which the tricolour was raised on the town hall.

In the 1980s, following significant population growth, the council led by the mayor, Jacques Floch, decided to commission a modern town hall. The site the selected, on the south side of Rue Jean Louis, had been occupied by the second town hall and later by a boys' school. Construction of the new building started in September 1987. It was designed by Alessandro Anselmi in the postmodern style, built in concrete and glass, and was officially opened on 14 July 1989.

The design involved a large curved frontage on the west side, which featured horizontal sunshades, and a long straight frontage on the east side, which featured long rows of sloping concrete tiles. Internally, the principal rooms were the Bureau du Maire (mayor's parlour), which was at the north tip of the complex, and the Salle du Conseil (council chamber), which was shaped like an eye and surmounted by a dome, and the Salle des Mariages (wedding room), which was decorated with murals by the local artist, Jean-Claude Mareschal.
