= Ambibarii =

Ancient Gallic tribe

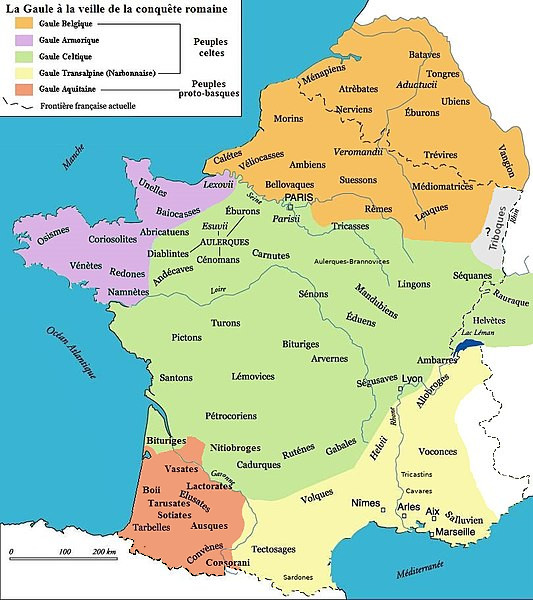
Maps of the Gallic and Aquitaine peoples

The Ambibarii were an ancient Gallic tribe living in Armorica during the Iron Age.

== Name ==
They are attested as Ambibarii by Caesar (mid-1st c. BC).

Most linguists analyse the name Ambibarii as based on the Gaulish stem bar(i)o ('anger, fury, passion'). Xavier Delamarre proposes to translate the name as 'the Furious' or 'the Passionate'.

Venceslas Kruta has suggested to identify them to the Ambiliati, although Julie Rémy notes there is no real evidence to support this proposal, apart from the fact that in both cases the names are associated with Armorican peoples.

== Geography ==
The Ambibarii have been located in the Manche department.

== History ==
During the Gallic Wars (58–50 BC), the Ambibarii are mentioned among the seven Armorican peoples bordering the Ocean who together supplied a contingent of twenty thousand men to the Gallic coalition in 52 BC.
