= Mbane Arrondissement =

Mbane
- Arrondissement
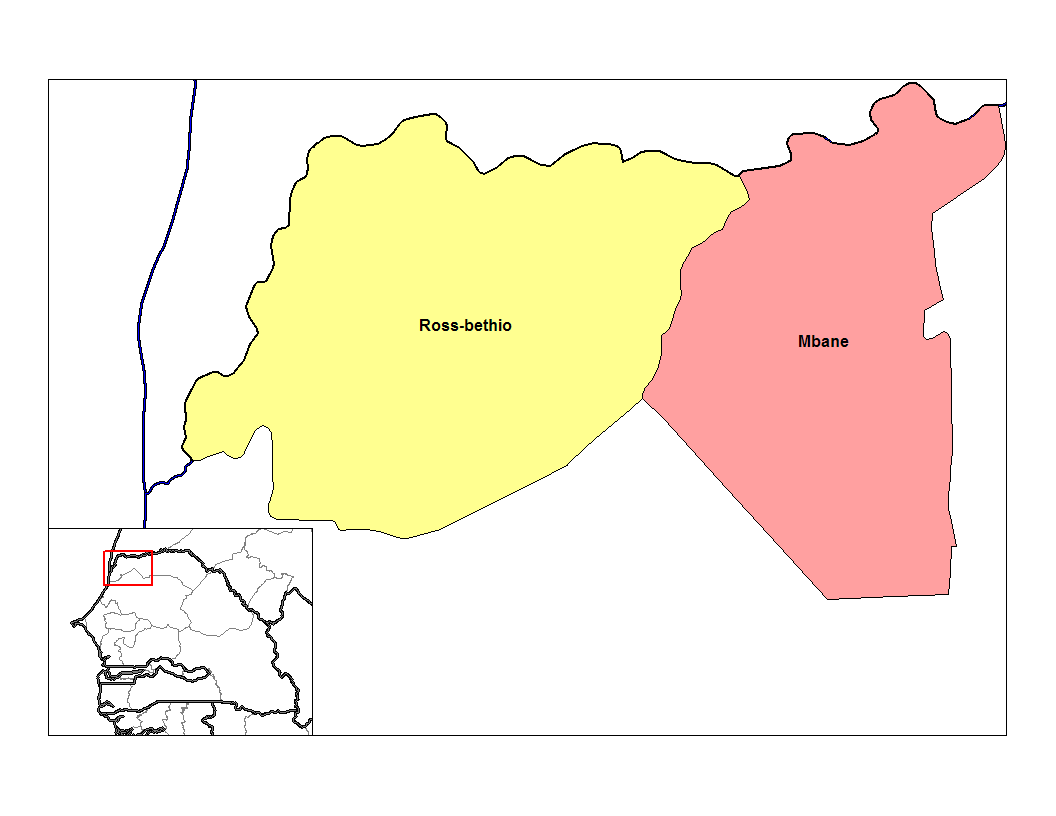
- Location in the Dagana Department
- Country: Senegal
- Region: Saint-Louis Region
- Department: Dagana Department
- Time zone: UTC±00:00 (GMT)

Mbane Arrondissement is an arrondissement of the Dagana Department in the Saint-Louis Region of Senegal.

== Subdivisions ==
The arrondissement is divided administratively into rural communities and in turn into villages.
