= Alfred of Beverley =

English chronicler and sacrist

Alfred of Beverley was an English chronicler, and sacrist of the collegiate church of St John the Evangelist and St John of Beverley wrote a history of Britain and England in nine chapters (c. 1148- c.1151) from its supposed foundation by the Trojan Brutus, down to the death of Henry I in 1135. Alfred's chief sources, in addition to Bede's Historia Ecclesiastica Gentis Anglorum , are Geoffrey of Monmouth's Historia Regum Britanniae, Henry of Huntingdon's Historia Anglorum, The Chronicle of John of Worcester, and the Historia Regum, attributed to Symeon of Durham.

== Biography ==
Alfred of Beverley, was a priest of Beverley, and is described in the preface to his book as "treasurer of the church of Beverley" and "Master Alfred, sacrist of the church of Beverley".

Alfred of Beverley speaks of himself as contemporary with the removal of the Flemings from the north of England to Ross in Herefordshire in 1112, and writes that he compiled his chronicle "when the church was silent, owing to the number of persons excommunicated under the decree of the council of London", an apparent reference to the council held at Mid-Lent, 1143. His attention, by his own account, was first drawn to history by the publication (before 1139) of Geoffrey of Monmouth's Historia Regum Britanniae, and he looked forward to following up the chronicle which bears his name, and which largely depends on Geoffrey's work, with a collection of excerpts from the credible portions of the Historia Regum Britanniae, but no trace of such a work is extant.

Alfred of Beverley's chronicle is entitled Aluredi Beverlacensis Annales sive Historia de gestis Regum Britanniæ libris ix. ad annum 1129. It is largely devoted to the fabulous history of Britain, and is mainly borrowed from Bede, Henry of Huntingdon, and Symeon of Durham, when Geoffrey of Monmouth is not laid under contribution. Alfred quotes occasionally from Suetonius, Orosius, and Nennius, and names many Roman authors whom he had consulted in vain for references to Britain. The chronicle is of no real use to the historical student, since it adds no new fact to the information to be found in well-known earlier authorities.

According to Sidney Lee (1885) the best manuscript of Alfred's Annales was among the Hengwrt MSS. belonging to W. W. E. Wynne, Esq., of Peniarth, Merionethshire, and had not been printed. Hearne printed the ‘Annales’ in 1716 from an inferior Bodleian MS. (Rawl. B. 200).

== Works ==
- Hearne, Thomas, ed. (1716). Aluredi Beverlacensis Annales sive Historia de Gestis Regum Britanniae. Oxford.
- Slevin, John, ed. (2023). The History of Alfred of Beverley. Translated by Lynda Lockyer. Boydell and Brewer.

== Sources ==
- This article incorporates text from a publication now in the public domain: Lee, Sidney (1885). "Alfred of Beverley". In Stephen, Leslie (ed.). Dictionary of National Biography. Vol. 1. London: Smith, Elder & Co. p. 258.
