= Namnetes =

Gallic tribe

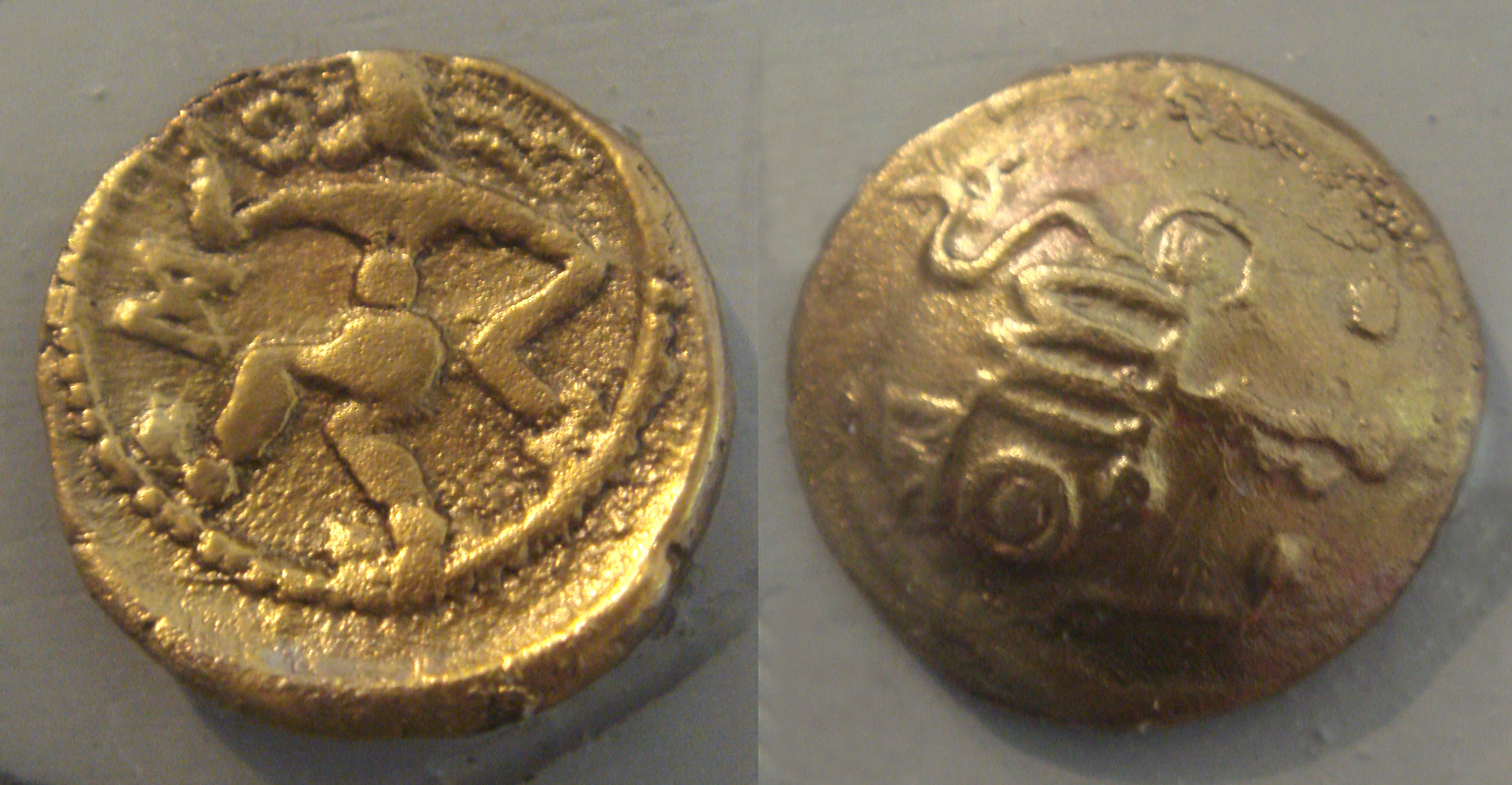
Coins of the Namnetes

The Namnetes were a Gallic tribe dwelling near the modern city of Nantes during the Iron Age and the Roman period.

== Name ==
They are mentioned as Namnitō͂n (Ναμνιτῶν) by Polybius (2nd c. BC) and Strabo (early 1st c. AD), Namnetes by Caesar (mid-1st c. BC) and Pliny (1st c. AD), and as Namnē͂tai (Ναμνῆται) by Ptolemy (2nd c. AD).

The etymology of the ethnonym Namnetes remains uncertain. Xavier Delamarre has tentatively proposed to interpret the name as 'those of the river', by deriving it from the Proto-Indo-European root *nem- ('curved, bend'), which also gave the Gaulish stem nantu- ('valley, stream'). The element namn- in Namnetes has also been compared to river names such as the Namn-asa in northern Spain and the Nemun-as in Lithuania. According to Blanca María Prósper, however, "Namnetes is a locus desperatus of Celtic etymology, and to judge from its overall look it probably contains a negative particle. Ethnic names often have an exotic, for us hardly understandable, and usually more complex look than place or river names."

== Geography ==
The Namnetes dwelled between the lower Loire, the Vilaine and the Semnon rivers. Their territory was situated west of the Andecavi, south of the Veneti and Redones, and north of the Pictones.

Their chief town was Condevincum, corresponding to the modern city of Nantes, and their chief port was known as Portus Nemetum.

== History ==
In the spring 56 BC, during the Gallic Wars, the Namnetes allied to the Veneti to fight against the fleet made by Caesar. Decimus Brutus, leader of the Roman fleet, won in the decisive Battle of Morbihan.

== Samnitae/Namnete Women's Island ==
According to Strabo, quoting Poseidonios, there is an island in the Ocean near the outlet of the Loire river which was inhabited by the "women of the Samnitae," which is generally taken to be a mistake and actually refers to the "Namnitae" or Namnetes. No man was ever allowed on the island and the women themselves sailed from it to have intercourse with men on the continent before returning there again. They also had the strange custom of unroofing their temple every year and roofing it again on the same day before sunset, each woman bringing her load to add to the roof. The woman whose load would fall out of her arms was rent to pieces by the rest, and they allegedly carried the pieces round the temple with the cry of "Ev-ah" in a frenetic manner.

According to French archaeologist Jean-Louis Brunaux, there are three reasons to consider the story as factual. First, the wet and windy climate of Western Gaul suggest that the Gallic dwellings (made of branches or reed) were re-roofed every year. Second, not to drop new material was, according to Pliny the Elder, a common religious practice of the Celts. Third, circumambulation existed as a rite among the Celts according to Poseidonios.
