= Dagana department, Senegal =

Dagana
- Department
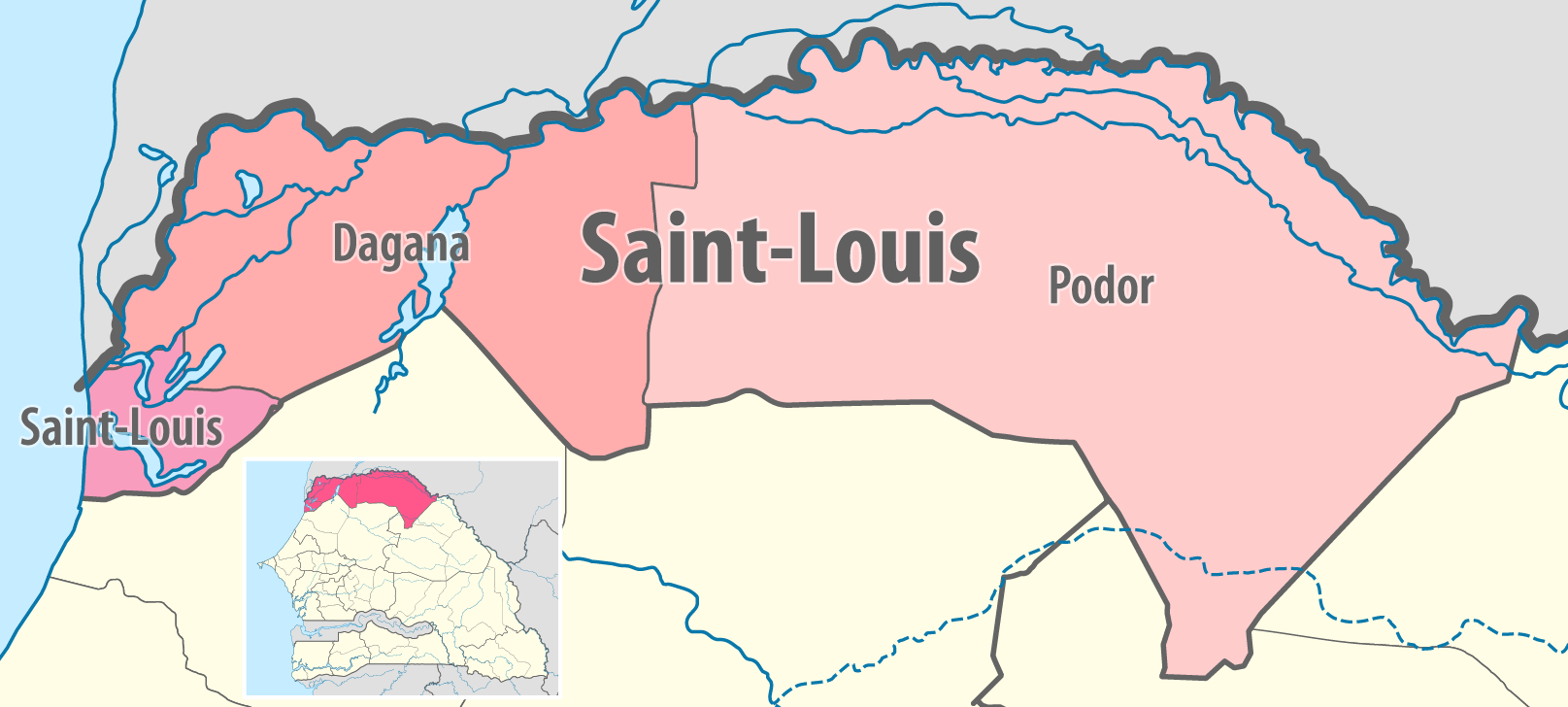
- Location in the Saint-Louis Region
- Country: Senegal
- Region: Saint-Louis Region
- Capital: Dagana

Area
  - Total: 5,208 km^{2} (2,011 sq mi)

Population (2023 census)
  - Total: 330,130
  - Density: 63.39/km^{2} (164.2/sq mi)
- Time zone: UTC+0 (GMT)

Dagana is one of the 46 departments of Senegal and one of the three departments of the north-western region of Saint-Louis. The capital is Dagana.

There are five communes; Dagana, Richard Toll, Rosso (Senegal), Gaé and Ross Béthio.

Rural districts (communautés rurales) comprise:

- Mbane Arrondissement:
  - Bokhol.
  - Mbane
- Ndiaye Arrondissement:
  - Ngnith
  - Diama
  - Ronkh

== Historic sites ==
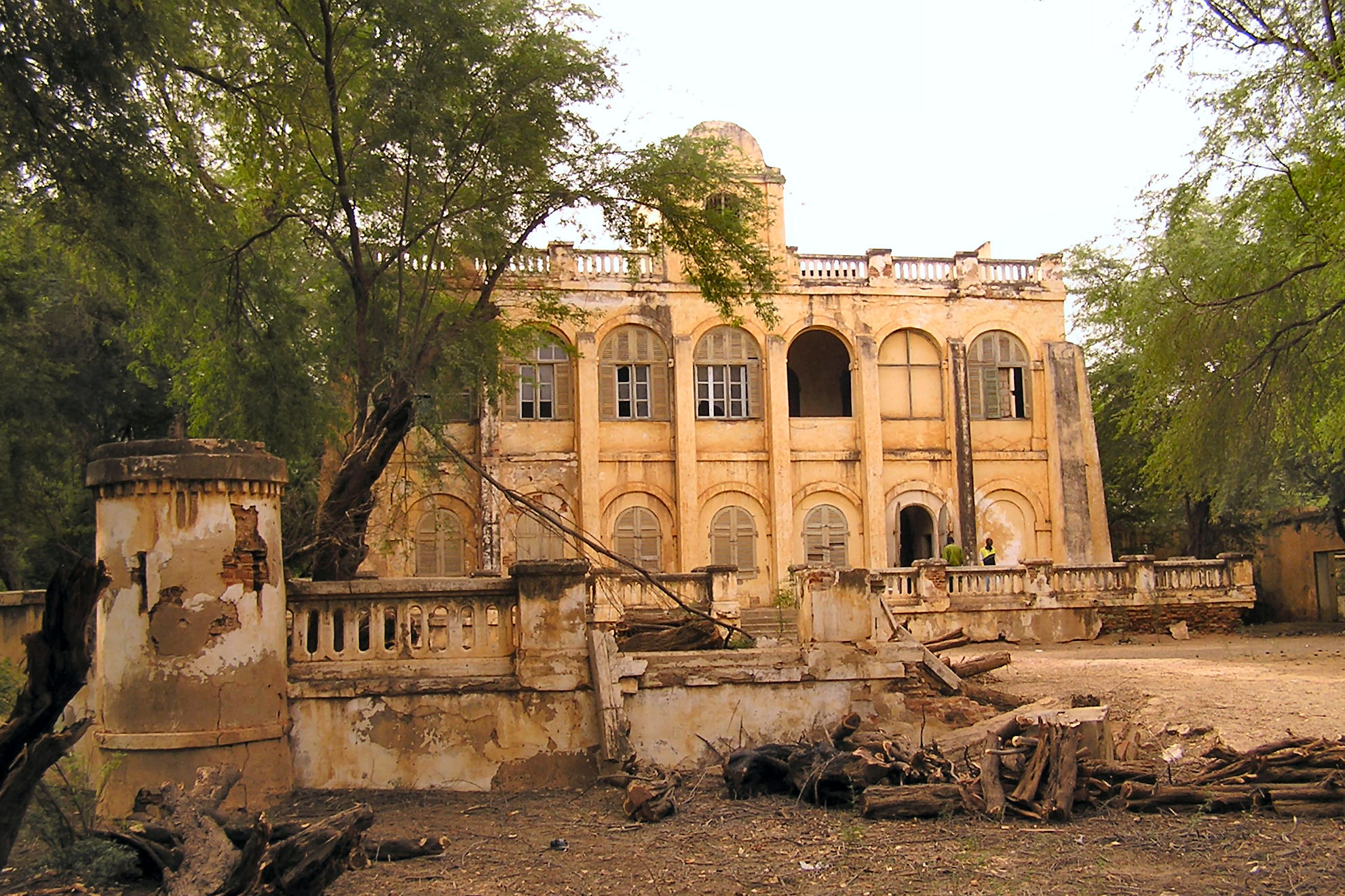
Baron Roger's Folly

- Fort of Dagana
- Water factory of Mbakhana
- The Residence at Richard Toll known as Baron Roger's Folly (or Chateau)

== In popular culture ==
The Siren of Good Intentions a novel by J. E. Mooney, ISBN 978-1733182911. Mooney was a Peace Corps volunteer in Bokhol in the mid-1970s.
