= Pictones =

Gallic people

The Pictones or Pictavi (Ancient Greek: Πίκτονες) were a Gallic people dwelling south of the lower Loire river, in the region later called Poitou, during the Iron Age and the Roman period.

Their chief town was Lemonum, the ancestor of modern Poitiers, and Ptolemy records a second town, Ratiatum (Rezé), on the Loire. During the Gallic Wars the Pictones sided with Caesar, supplying ships for his campaign against the Veneti in 56 BC, and their leader Duratios received Roman citizenship. Their territory became the civitas of the Pictones, which held the rank of capital of Aquitania in the 2nd century AD. The later form of their name, Pictavi, survives in those of Poitiers and Poitou.

== Name ==
The people are mentioned as Pictonibus and Pictones by Caesar (mid-1st c. BC), as Piktónōn (Πικτόνων) by Strabo (early 1st c. AD), Pictones by Pliny (1st c. AD), Píktones (Πίκτονες; var. πήκτωνες, πήκτονες, πίκτωνες) by Ptolemy (2nd c. AD), and as Pictonici by Ausonius (4th c. AD). The form Pictavi, which underlies the medieval and modern names, appears in an inscription (Pictonum, CIL 13:1129) and in later authors: Pictavi in Ammianus Marcellinus (4th c. AD), civitas Pictavorum in the Notitia Galliarum (4th c. AD), and Pictavorum in Sulpicius Severus (early 5th c. AD).

The etymology of Pictones is uncertain. It is presumably formed from the same root as the later form Pictavi, but with a different suffix. The element pict- has been connected with a Celtic root meaning 'to carve' or 'to engrave', comparable to Old Irish cicht, rather than with the Latin pictus ('painted'), though the derivation remains obscure.

The city of Poitiers, attested ca. 356 AD as urbis Pictavorum (Pictavis in 400–410, Peitieus [*Pectievs] in 1071–1127), and the region of Poitou, are named after the Gallic tribe.

== Geography ==
=== Territory ===
The Pictones dwelt south of the lower Loire, in the region later called Poitou, corresponding to the modern departments of the Vienne and the Deux-Sèvres, with part of the Vendée. The northern limit of their land ran along the lower course of the Loire.

The extent of the territory changed over time. The numismatist Jean Hiernard has argued that before the Gallic Wars the Pictones held a smaller area, centred on the threshold between the Massif Central and the Armorican Massif (the Haut-Poitou), its borders marked by boundary place-names of the equoranda type, for example at Ingrandes-sur-Vienne. After 56 BC the civitas was enlarged northward as far as the Loire, taking in the north-western district of the Ambilatri (or Ambiliati), formerly within the Armorican sphere, and the town of Ratiatum (Rezé) on the Loire, opposite Condevincum (Nantes), the capital of the Namnetes. This enlargement is dated by Gilbert Charles-Picard to Caesar's settlement in favour of the pro-Roman leader Duratios, and by the excavators of Ratiatum to the reign of Augustus, when the town was founded and the enlarged 'Grand Poitou' took shape. Under the Empire the land of the Pictones covered the Vienne, the Deux-Sèvres and the Vendée together with the southern parts of the Maine-et-Loire and the Loire-Atlantique, the Loire forming the frontier with the Namnetes, the Andecavi and the Turones.

To the north, across the lower Loire, the Pictones bordered the Namnetes, the Andecavi to the north-east and the Turones to the east. Their other neighbours were the Bituriges Cubi to the east, the Lemovices to the south-east and the Santones to the south. To the south-west lay an Atlantic gulf, later silted up to form the Marais Poitevin, the centre of an active maritime trade.

=== Settlements ===
Lemonum (modern Poitiers) stood on a promontory formed by the confluence of the Boivre and Clain rivers, accessible only from the south. An oppidum in the pre-Roman period, it became the chief town of the civitas and, in the 2nd century, the capital of Aquitania.

Ratiatum (modern Rezé), on the south bank of the lower Loire opposite Nantes, is named by Ptolemy as the second town of the Pictones. Excavation of an urban quarter has revealed a planned layout with two domus, shops and workshops, occupied from the 1st to the 5th century AD. The settlement was developed under Augustus as part of the extension of the civitas to the Loire, and gave the Pictones an outlet on the estuary opposite the Namnete capital. Its name is Celtic, connected with ratis ('raft, ferry-boat').

== History ==
=== Background ===
Before the Roman conquest the Pictones struck their own coinage, whose circulation is concentrated in the Haut-Poitou, the Niortais and the plain of the Vendée, while Armorican coin is found in the north-western district. They were a maritime people, active around the Atlantic gulf that later became the Marais Poitevin.

=== Gallic Wars ===
The Pictones first enter recorded history during the Gallic Wars. In 56 BC Caesar required them, with the Santones, to build and supply ships for his campaign against the Veneti, and they placed their fleet at the disposal of Brutus. Their pro-Roman policy was directed by Duratios (Duratius), who had backed Caesar from the outset. In 52 BC a Pictones contingent of 8,000 men joined the force sent to relieve Vercingetorix at Alesia.

Part of the civitas then revolted against Duratius. The rebels, reinforced by allies from neighbouring peoples and led by Dumnacus of the Andecavi, besieged Duratius in Lemonum, the chief Pictones stronghold, an episode related by Hirtius. In 51 BC the Roman legates Caninius Rebilus and Fabius relieved the town. Duratius received from Caesar the gentilicium Iulius, one of the first Gauls to obtain it, and placed the head of Venus on his coins.

=== Roman period ===
After the conquest the territory of the Pictones was organised as a civitas within the province of Aquitania. They obtained Latin right at an early date. Neither Pliny nor the Pharsalia is decisive on their status, as Pliny does not list them among the free peoples and the line describing them as immunes in Lucan is generally held to be a Renaissance interpolation, but the inscriptions of Marcus Sedatius Severianus show that the Pictones were enrolled in the tribus Quirina, that of the emperors Claudius and Vespasian.

In the 2nd century AD Lemonum replaced Mediolanum Santonum (Saintes) as the capital of Aquitania, a rank confirmed by Géza Alföldy's identification, in the fasti of Ostia, of the AD 160 consulship of Marcus Censorius Paulus, legate of Aquitania, whose wife Claudia Varenilla received funeral honours from the civitas. The most prominent Pictones of the period was the senator Marcus Sedatius Severianus, from a family of Loire nautae, who became consul in 153 and governor of Dacia before dying in Armenia in 161.

In the second half of the 2nd century AD many sites across Poitou show signs of destruction. (Note: Gilbert Charles-Picard connected these destructions with the revolt of Maternus and a wider movement of unrest in western Gaul, a reconstruction that he himself presented as conjectural.) Lemonum lost its rank of provincial capital to Burdigala (Bordeaux) by the later 3rd century. A defensive wall (castrum) was built around a reduced part of the town at the end of the 3rd and the beginning of the 4th century. The name Pictavi survived in that of the medieval city of Poitiers.

== Economy ==
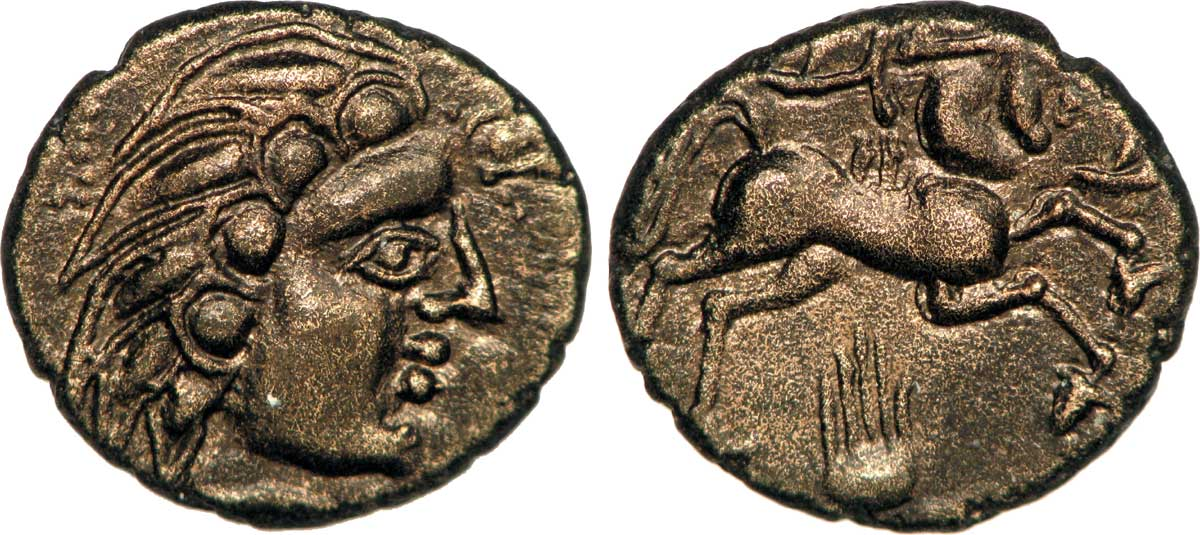
Pictonian stater, electrum (1st c. BC). Obverse: Head of Ogmios inspired by Philip II of Macedonia, Reverse: Charioteer holding a crown directing an androcephalic horse over a hand

The prosperity of the civitas rested on both agriculture and trade. According to Pliny, the Pictones, like the Aedui, attempted to grow not only vines but also olives, amending their soils with lime. Cereals remained the main resource, and stock-raising, linked to the popularity of the cult of Epona, supported the poorer Bocage country. Argentiferous lead was worked at Melle. Ship-building, already attested by Caesar, was tied to fishing and to seaborne trade. Ratiatum, on the lower Loire opposite Nantes, gave the Pictones a commercial position on the estuary, controlling part of the traffic between the Atlantic seaboard and the interior.

== Religion ==
The Pictones honoured the gods listed by Caesar. Mercury, under the epithet Adsmerius, held the western side of Poitiers, where the sanctuary of La Roche grew from 1st-century chapels into a monumental complex in the 2nd century. Apollo, with the epithet Matuix, and his Tutela were also prominent, and Jupiter appears both in classical form and as the anguipede rider carried on four-god pillars. Epona was associated with the breeding of horses and donkeys in the region.

The cult of Minerva was well represented. Two dedications to the goddess from Pictones territory associate her with the imperial cult, and she recurs on several of the four-god pillars. On the strength of new inscriptions and sculptures, Alain Tranoy argued that Minerva, long thought to have been little worshipped among the Pictones, was in fact one of the principal deities of the civitas, honoured both by rural landowners and in the town's expressions of loyalty to the emperor. A marble statue of Minerva, found at Poitiers in 1902, had decorated the domus of a wealthy inhabitant.
