= Andecavi =

Gallic tribe

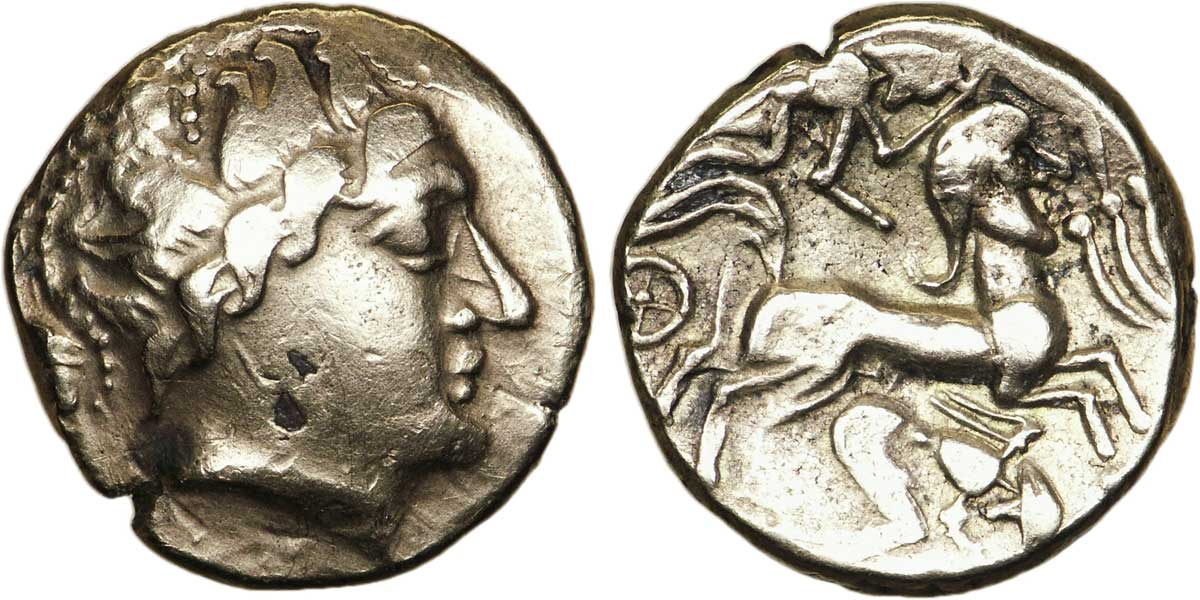
Andecavi stater.

The Andecavi (also Andicavi, Andegavi, or Andigavi) were a Gallic tribe dwelling in Aremorica during the Roman period.

== Name ==
They are mentioned as Andecavi (var. andic-, andeg-, andig-) by Pliny (1st c. AD), Andecavi and Andecavos by Tacitus (early 2nd c. AD), A̓ndíkauoi (Ἀνδίκαυοι; var. Ὀνδικαοῦαι, Ὠνδικαοῦαι) by Ptolemy (2nd c. AD), and as Andicavos (var. andegauus, andecauos, andigabos, andigabus, andicabos) by Orosius (early 5th c. AD).

The etymology of the ethnonym Andecauī remains uncertain. Ande- is a Gaulish intensifying suffix, but the interpretation of the second element is difficult. Andecaui could mean ''those of the big hollow', from the Celtic root *kuwo- ('hollow'; cf. OIr. cúa, 'hollow, cavity'; Welsh keu, 'hollow, closed'; OBr. cau, 'closed, covered'). Pierre-Yves Lambert has also suggested a connection with a shortened form of the Celtic root *kawaro- ('hero, champion'; cf. OIr. cuar 'hero', Middle Welsh cawr 'giant').

The city of Angers, attested ca. 400 AD as civitas Andecavorum ('civitas of the Andecavi', Andegavis in 861–882, Angieus in 1127), and the region of Anjou, attested in 767 as pago Andegavinse (in Andecavo in 797, Anjau ca. 1071–1127), are named after the Gallic tribe.

== Geography ==
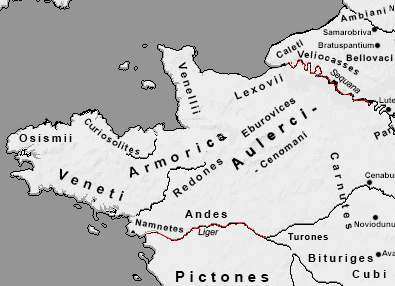
Map of Armorica showing the territory of the Andes or Andecavi along the Loire (ancient name Liger)

The territory of the Andecavi roughly corresponded with the diocese of Angers, Anjou, in the department Maine-et-Loire in present-day France. Although Caesar locates the Andes "near the Ocean", they held no coast and were located inland along the Loire river.

Their chief town, Iuliomagus (modern Angers), developed from a densely occupied Late Iron Age settlement. By the late 1st century BC, a fortified oppidum of roughly 9 hectares stood on a promontory above the Maine. Finds of military material point to a continued Roman presence from the mid-1st century BC. In the early 1st century AD, the settlement was reorganised and laid out with a street grid within a short period, suggesting deliberate planning rather than slow expansion.

After the Augustan reorganisation in the late 1st century BC, the settlement became the capital of the civitas and probably adopted the name Iuliomagus at that time. It then spread beyond its earlier limits, covering about 70 hectares by 10–15 AD, with new housing and workshop areas, including for pottery and ironworking. Some streets were marked out in advance of later construction under Tiberius. Buildings continued to be made mainly of wood and earth, with stone architecture appearing only gradually.

== History ==
In Book 3 of the Bellum Gallicum, Caesar says that the Andes provided winter quarters for Publius Crassus after his mission into Armorica, which brought several Gallic polities into relations with Rome. Over the winter of 57–56 BC, the Romans built a fleet on the Loire under the command of Decimus Brutus, presumably in preparation for an invasion of Britannia, but which was instead called into action against the Veneti when Armorican objections were raised.

The Andes, led by Dumnacus, played a significant role in the continuing war against Rome after the defeat of Vercingetorix at Alesia. Dumnacus's efforts are recounted by Aulus Hirtius in his continuation of the Bellum Gallicum (Book 8), which covers the two years of the war after Caesar had declared his mission accomplished. Dumnacus lay siege to Limonum (present-day Poitiers), an oppidum of the Pictones, and engaged without success the Roman relief army under the command of Gaius Caninius Rebilus. When additional Roman forces arrived on the scene, Dumnacus was forced to lift the siege and retreat. The army of the Andes was pursued by the Romans and suffered heavy casualties. In a decisive battle the following day, the Romans killed some 12,000 men. Dumnacus escaped, and when Armorica surrendered, he went into self-imposed exile.
