= Albani =

Albani may refer to:

== People ==
- Albani family, an aristocratic Roman family of Albanian origin
- Albani, or Albanoi, an Illyrian tribe

=== People with the surname ===
==== Born before 1900 ====
- Alessandro Albani (1692–1779), Italian Cardinal and antiquities collector
- Annibale Albani (1682–1751), Italian Cardinal
- Dame Emma Albani (1847–1930), Canadian soprano singer
- Francesco Albani (1578–1660), Italian painter
- Gian Francesco Albani (1720–1803), Italian Cardinal
- Gian Girolamo Albani (1509–1591), Italian Cardinal
- Giovanni Battista Albani (died 1588), Roman Catholic prelate who served as Patriarch of Alexandria
- Giuseppe Albani (1750–1834), Italian Cardinal
- Fra' Ludovico Chigi Albani della Rovere (1866–1951), 76th Prince and Grand Master of the Sovereign Military Order of Malta
- Marcella Albani (1899–1959), Italian actress
- Mathias Albani (1621-1673), violin maker from Botzen (now Bolzano in South Tyrol)
- Pope Clement XI (1649–1721), born Giovanni Francesco Albani

==== Born after 1900 ====
- Giuseppe Albani (footballer) (1921–1989), Italian footballer
- Giorgio Albani (1929–2015), Italian racing cyclist
- Luigi Albani (1928–1993), Italian footballer
- Marcello Albani (1905–1980), American-born Italian filmmaker
- Muhammad Nasiruddin al-Albani (1914–1999), Albanian Islamic scholar
- Nicola Albani (born 1981), San Marinese footballer
- Romano Albani (1945–2014), Italian cinematographer
- Stephan Albani (born 1968), German physicist and politician

== Other uses ==
- Albani Brewery, in Odense, Denmark
- Colli Albani (Rome Metro), station on the Rome Metro, Line A
- Villa Albani, villa in Rome
- Alban Hills, hills in Rome also known as Colli Albani

== See also ==
- Albini
- Albany (disambiguation)
- Albano (disambiguation)
- Albanus (disambiguation)
- Albania (disambiguation)
- Albanian (disambiguation)
- Albanians (disambiguation)
