= Alban =

Alban may refer to:

- Alban (surname)
- Alban (given name)
- Alban people, Latin people from the city of Alba Longa
- Things or people from or related to Alba (Gaelic for 'Scotland')
- Alban wine, a wine of ancient Rome from Colli Albani
- Alban Vineyards, California wine produced by vintner John Alban
- An alternative name used in Spain for wines made from the Palomino (grape)
- A minor Kazakh Jüz "horde", numbering ca. 100,000

== Places ==
- Alban Hills of Rome, Italy (also known as Colli Albania)
- Alban, Tarn, France
- Alban, Wisconsin, US, a town
- Alban (community), Wisconsin, US, an unincorporated community
- Alban, Ontario, Canada
- Albán, Colombia
- Albán, Cundinamarca, Colombia
- Yr Alban, Welsh for Scotland

== See also ==
- Albany (disambiguation)
- Albanus (disambiguation)
- Albania (disambiguation)
- Albanian (disambiguation)
- Saint-Alban (disambiguation)
- St. Albans (disambiguation)
- St Albans railway station (disambiguation)
- St. Albans School (disambiguation)
