= Albany =

Albany, derived from Alba, the Gaelic for Scotland, most commonly refers to:

- Albany, New York, the capital of the State of New York and largest city of this name
- Albany, Western Australia, a port city in the Great Southern region

Albany may also refer to:

== Arts and music ==
- "Albany" (1981), a song by the British singer Roger Whittaker
- Albany Theatre (formerly the Albany Empire), in Deptford, South London, England
- Albany Theatre (Coventry), in Coventry, England

== Organizations and institutions ==
=== England ===
- Albany Academy, Chorley
- Hornchurch High School, London, formerly The Albany School

=== United States ===
==== Georgia ====
- Albany Movement, desegregation coalition formed in Albany, Georgia in 1961
- Albany State University, Albany

==== New York ====
- Albany Great Danes, the athletic program of the University at Albany
- Albany Records, a record label in Albany
- Albany Symphony Orchestra
- University at Albany, SUNY

== People ==
- Albany Leon Bigard, better known as Barney Bigard, a jazz musician
- Duke of Albany, a Scottish, and later, British peerage title
  - Regent Albany (disambiguation), several Dukes of Albany who were regent of Scotland
- Michel Roger Lafosse, or Michael James Alexander Stewart of Albany, a claimant to the Scottish throne

== Places ==
=== Australia ===
- Electoral district of Albany, situated in Western Australia
  - City of Albany, a local government area within the electoral district
    - Albany, Western Australia, the city around which the LGA is centered
      - Port of Albany, the port of Albany
      - Albany (suburb), the city center
      - Port Albany, Western Australia, another suburb within the city
- Albany Creek, Queensland, a suburb of Brisbane
- Albany Island, off Cape York Peninsula, Queensland

=== Bahamas ===
- Albany, New Providence, a luxury resort

=== Canada ===
- Albany, Edmonton, a neighborhood of Edmonton, Alberta
- Albany, Nova Scotia, a community
- Albany, Prince Edward Island, an unincorporated community
- Albany River, a river in Ontario
- Fort Albany First Nation, a tribe in Ontario
  - Fort Albany (Ontario), the historical trading post at whose site the First Nation was established

=== New Zealand ===
- Albany, New Zealand, a suburb of Auckland
- Albany (New Zealand electorate), existed between 1978 and 2002

=== South Africa ===
- Albany, South Africa, a region in the Eastern Cape named after the capital of New York State

=== United Kingdom ===
- Albany, Tyne and Wear, a suburb of Washington
- Albany (Liverpool), formerly a meeting place for cotton brokers, now divided into apartments
- Albany (London), an apartment complex in London
- HM Prison Albany, a Category B men's prison on the Isle of Wight

=== United States ===
- Lake Albany, a prehistoric proglacial lake

==== Cities and neighborhoods ====
- Albany, Alabama, a former city, now a neighborhood of Decatur, Alabama
- Albany, California, a city
- Albany, Georgia, a city
- Albany Park, Chicago, a neighborhood of Chicago, Illinois
- New Albany, Indiana, a city
- Albany, Kentucky, a city
- Albany, Minnesota, a city
- Albany, Missouri, a city
- Albany, New York, the state capital
- Albany, Oregon, a city
- Albany, Texas, a city

==== Towns ====
- Albany, Indiana, a town
- Albany, Louisiana, a town
- Albany, New Hampshire, a town
- Albany, Vermont, a town
  - Albany (village), Vermont, a village in the town
- Albany, Green County, Wisconsin, a town
  - Albany, Wisconsin, a village in the town
- Albany, Pepin County, Wisconsin, a town

==== Unincorporated communities ====
- Albany, Illinois, a village
- Albany, Iowa, an unincorporated community in Westfield Township, Fayette County, Iowa
- Albany, Ray County, Missouri, an unincorporated community
- Albany, Ohio, a village
- Albany, Oklahoma, a census-designated place
- Albany, Pennsylvania, an unincorporated community
- Albany, Wyoming, a census-designated place

== Transportation ==
=== Air ===
- Albany Airport (disambiguation), a list of airports associated with places named Albany

=== Ships ===
- Albany (sternwheeler 1868), operated on the Willamette River in Oregon, United States, wrecked 1875
- HMS Albany, the name of three ships of the Royal Navy
- HMAS Albany (ACPB 86), an Armidale–class patrol boat of the Royal Australian Navy
- MV Empire Albany, later renamed Albany
- USS Albany, the name of six ships of the US Navy, all named for Albany, New York

=== Road ===
- Albany (1903 automobile), an early British automobile
- Albany (1907 automobile), an early American automobile
- Albany (late 20th-century automobile), an English car of the 1970s with "veteran styling"

=== Rail ===
- Albany station (Oregon)
- Albany–Rensselaer station, New York

== See also ==
- Alba, the Scottish Gaelic name for Scotland, also anglicized as Albany
- Albany County (disambiguation)
- Albany Empire (disambiguation)
- Albany Park (disambiguation)
- Albany Township (disambiguation)
- New Albany (disambiguation)
- Albania (disambiguation)
- Albanian (disambiguation)
- Albanians (disambiguation)
- Albion (disambiguation)
