= Albinus =

Albinus is a name.

Notable people known as Albinus include:

== People with the mononym ==
- Albinus (philosopher), Greek philosopher
- Albinus (abbot), abbot of St. Peter's, Canterbury
- Alcuin of York, a Northumbrian scholar, nicknamed Albinus
- St. Albinus of Angers (Aubin, Albin), bishop
- Albinus of Provence, Merovingian duke and bishop
- Witta of Büraburg, also known as Albinus
- Albin of Brechin, Scottish bishop
- Albinus, cardinal-bishop of Albano from 1189 to 1206

== Romans ==
- Lucceius Albinus, Roman governor of Judaea, 62–64 AD
- Clodius Albinus, Roman imperial pretender in the 2nd century
- Decimus Junius Brutus Albinus, assassin of Julius Caesar
- Caecina Decius Albinus, urban prefect of Rome in 402
- Aulus Postumius Albinus (consul 151 BC), historian
- Caecina Decius Aginatius Albinus, son of Caecina Decius Albinus and urban prefect of Rome in 414
- Albinus (consul 444)
- Albinus (consul 493)

== People with the surname ==
- Bernhardus Albinus, German physician (1653–1721)
- Bernhard Siegfried Albinus, German-born Dutch physician (1697–1770)
- Christiaan Bernhard Albinus (c. 1698–1752), German-Dutch anatomist
- Frederik Bernard Albinus (1715–1778), Dutch anatomist
- Jens Albinus (born 1965), Danish actor
