= Albano =

Albano may refer to:

== Places ==
- Albano (river), Lombardy, Italy
- Lake Albano, Italy
- Roman Catholic Suburbicarian Diocese of Albano, near Rome
- Albano (Stockholm), an area in Stockholm, Sweden
- Albano Lacus, a hydrocarbon lake on Saturn's largest moon, Titan
- Albano Laziale, a comune in the province of Rome, Italy
- Albano di Lucania, a comune in the province of Potenza, Italy
- Albano Sant'Alessandro, a comune in the province of Bergamo, Italy
- Albano Vercellese, a comune in the province of Vercelli, Italy

== People ==
- Albano (name), a list of people with the given name or surname
- Albano (footballer, born 1922), Albano Narciso Pereira (1922–1990), Portuguese football forward
- Albano (footballer, born 1997), Albano Sehn Neto, Brazilian football midfielder
- Albanus Albano, a pen name of Vaso Pasha (1825-1892), Albanian writer and poet and Governor General of Lebanon

== Other uses ==
- Albano buoy system, used to mark lanes for rowing and canoeing events
- an alternative name for the Italian wine grape Trebbiano
- a synonym for the Italian wine grape Albana

== See also ==
- Al Bano (born 1943), Italian singer and actor
