= List of schools in the London Borough of Havering =

This is a list of schools in the London Borough of Havering, England.

== State-funded schools ==
=== Primary schools ===
Primary schools (including infant and junior schools) in the borough include:

RC indicates Roman Catholic and CE indicates Church of England

- Ardleigh Green Infant School
- Ardleigh Green Junior School
- Benhurst Primary School
- Brady Primary School
- Branfil Primary School
- Broadford Primary School
- Brookside Infant School
- Clockhouse Primary School
- Concordia Academy
- Crowlands Primary School
- Crownfield Infant School
- Crownfield Junior School
- Dame Tipping CE Primary School
- Drapers' Brookside Infant School
- Drapers' Brookside Junior School
- Drapers' Maylands Primary School
- Drapers' Pyrgo Priory School
- Elm Park Primary School
- Engayne Primary School
- Gidea Park Primary School
- Hacton Primary School
- Harold Court Primary School
- Harold Wood Primary School
- Harrow Lodge Primary School
- Hilldene Primary School
- Hylands Primary School
- The James Oglethorpe Primary School
- La Salette RC Primary School
- Langtons Infant School
- Langtons Junior Academy
- The Mawney Foundation School
- Mead Primary School
- Nelmes Primary School
- Newtons Primary School
- Oasis Academy Pinewood
- Parklands Primary School
- Parsonage Farm Primary School
- Rainham Village Primary School
- Rise Park Infant School
- Rise Park Junior School
- The RJ Mitchell Primary School
- St Alban's RC Primary School
- St Edward's CE Primary School
- St Joseph's RC Primary School
- St Mary's RC Primary School
- St Patrick's RC Primary School
- St Peter's RC Primary School
- St Ursula's RC Primary School
- Scargill Infant School
- Scargill Junior School
- Scotts Primary School
- Squirrels Heath Infant School
- Squirrels Heath Junior School
- Suttons Primary School
- Towers Infant School
- Towers Junior School
- Upminster Infant School
- Upminster Junior School
- Whybridge Infant School
- Whybridge Junior School

=== Secondary schools ===
Secondary schools include:

- Abbs Cross Academy and Arts College
- Bower Park Academy
- The Brittons Academy
- The Campion School (Boys, RC)*
- Coopers' Company and Coborn School
- Drapers' Academy
- Emerson Park Academy
- Frances Bardsley Academy for Girls (Girls)
- Gaynes School
- Hall Mead School
- Harris Academy Rainham
- Hornchurch High School
- Marshalls Park Academy
- Redden Court School
- Royal Liberty School (Boys)
- Sacred Heart of Mary Girls' School (Girls, RC)
- St Edward's Church of England Academy (CE)
- Sanders Draper School

=== Special and alternative schools ===
Special schools in the borough include:

- The Compass School
- Corbets Tey School
- Lime Academy Forest Approach
- Lime Academy Ravensbourne
- Olive AP Academy - Havering

=== Further education ===
- Harris Rainham Sixth Form
- Havering Sixth Form College
- Havering College of Further and Higher Education

== Independent schools ==
=== Primary and preparatory schools ===
- Gidea Park College
- Oakfields Montessori School
- St Mary's Hare Park School

=== Senior and all-through schools ===
- Immanuel School

=== Special and alternative schools ===
- BEP Academy
- The Bridge
- KORU Independent AP Academy
