= Albania Municipality =

Albania Municipality may refer to:

- Albania, La Guajira, Colombia
- Albania, Santander, Colombia
- Albania, Caquetá, Colombia

== See also ==
- Albania (disambiguation)
