= Albanus =

Albanus may refer to:

- Alba Longa, an ancient city near Rome in Italy
- Alban of Britain, protomartyr of Britain and saint
- Alban of Mainz, martyr, missionary, priest and saint
- Alban Hills, southeast of Rome were known as Albanus Mons to the Romans, and Lago Albano in the Alban Hills was called Albanus Lacus
- Albanus Glacier, located in Antarctica near the Tapley Mountains
- Galeas Albanus, a ship from Äpplö in Åland that sailed in the Baltic Sea during the early 20th century or the replica built 1986-1988

== See also ==
- Albinus (disambiguation)
- Albania (disambiguation)
- Albanian (disambiguation)
- Albanians (disambiguation)
