= Albany Empire =

Albany Empire may refer to:

- Albany Theatre (formerly the Albany Empire), a multi-purpose arts centre in Deptford, South London
- Albany Empire (AFL), a former professional arena football team based in Albany, New York
- Albany Empire (NAL), National Arena League indoor football team in Albany, New York

== See also ==
- MV Empire Albany, later renamed Albany
- Albany (disambiguation)
