= Buša =

Breed of cattle

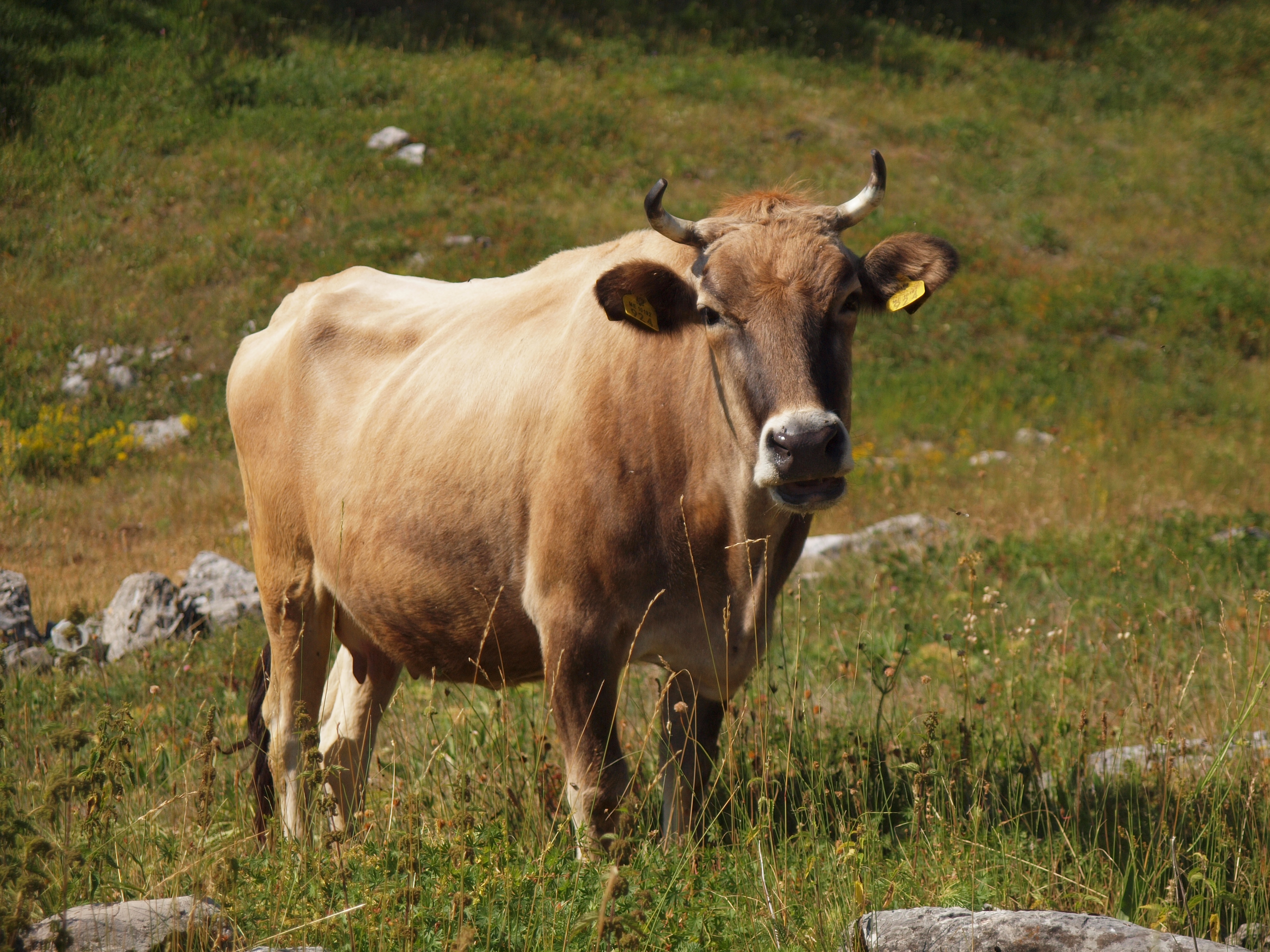
- Buša cow in Bijela gora, Montenegro
- Conservation status: FAO (2007): not at risk
- Other names: Busha; Busa
- Country of origin: Albania; Bosnia and Herzegovina; Croatia; Kosovo; Montenegro; North Macedonia; Serbia

The Buša or Busha is a breed or group of breeds of small short-horned cattle distributed in south-eastern Europe, principally in Albania and the countries of the former Yugoslavia – Bosnia and Herzegovina, Croatia, Kosovo, Macedonia, Montenegro and Serbia. Related breeds include the Gurgucke, Lekbibaj and Prespa of Albania, the Gacko of Bosnia and Herzegovina, the Greek Shorthorn, the Metohija Red of Kosovo and the Rhodope Shorthorn of Bulgaria.

== History ==
The Buša is a traditional breed or group of breeds of Albania and the countries of the former Yugoslavia – Bosnia, Croatia, Kosovo, Macedonia, Montenegro and Serbia. It forms part of a larger group of related breeds including the Gurgucke, Lekbibaj and Prespa of Albania, the Gacko or Gatacko of Bosnia and Herzegovina, the Greek Shorthorn, the Metohija Red of Kosovo and the Rodopi of Bulgaria. The Anatolian Black of Turkey is also related, but more distantly, as it has some zebuine heritage.

From the early twentieth century to the time of the Second World War, the Croatian Busa was cross-bred with bulls of the Austrian Montafon and Tyrolean Grey breeds.

== Characteristics ==
The Busha is distributed throughout the Balkan Peninsula; names, sizes, colours and characteristics vary from country to country within that region. In general terms, the cattle weigh some 150–250 kg, stand some 90–115 cm at the withers, and are reared in mountainous areas.

Characteristics and data for the regional variants are:

Country	Height	Weight	Coat colour	Population	Conservation status	Milk yield
Albania	bulls: 130 cm; cows: 95 cm	bulls: 220 kg; cows: 170 kg	brown, grey-brown or reddish	2014: 760 cows, 67 bulls	unknown	800–1300 kg; fat: 4.2–5.6%; protein: 3.6–4.7%
Bosnia and Herzegovina	cows: 102–112 cm	cows: 200–300 kg	unicoloured brown, grey, black or red, with dark dorsal stripe	2013: 80; 70 cows	unknown	1000–1450 kg
Croatia	bulls: 118 cm; cows: 112 cm	bulls: 400 kg; cows: 250 kg	unicoloured brown, yellow-brown or dark brown; "crno-saro", black-tinged	2013: 785; 385 cows, 35 bulls	at risk	600–1300 kg; fat: 5%
Kosovo	–	–	–	–	–	–
Montenegro	90–115 cm	cows: 150–250 kg	unicoloured brown, grey, black or red, with dark dorsal stripe	2013: 150	at risk	700–1500 kg
North Macedonia	cows: 105–107 cm	bulls: 245–390 kg; cows: 180–360 kg	black, red, grey, brindle	2013: 1000–2000	unknown	1000–1500 kg; fat: 4.05%
Serbia	bulls: 110 cm; cows: 100 cm	bulls: 400 kg; cows: 280 kg	black, red, grey, blue roan	2013: 700	at risk	874 kg; fat: 4.58%; protein: 3.45%

Y-chromosomal microsatellite data for the Busha shows it to be related to the Simmental and the cattle of Italy, and also to the Red Gorbatov and Yurino of Central Asia.

Until the middle of the twentieth century, the Buša was the dominant cattle breed of the inhabitants of the wider area of the Balkans, and spread south of the Sava and Danube rivers, from Avala to Olympus and from the Rhodope to the Velebit. Buša cattle were raised together with sheep and goats in the mountainous regions in an extensive (primitive) way. There was less work and care around them than around sheep. Buša cattle were kept on pasture and in the bush, and in some regions they were kept in free grazing both in winter and summer. Cattle tolerated poor food and accommodation. They were kept in uncovered pens, and in winter in places sheltered from the wind. Cheese, cream and butter were made from cow's and sheep's milk. Buša gives quality whole milk. The exterior and production characteristics of Buša are a reflection of the poor conditions under which cattle was raised over the centuries in hilly and mountainous regions with primitive cattle breeding.

Early weaning of calves, premature fertilization of young cows, poor nutrition and accommodation affected the morphological and physiological characteristics of Buša. Resident herders who lived in multi-member cooperative families where the division of labor was carried out according to gender and age, managed to provide the basic necessities of life with their work. The livestock breeding system (sheep, goats and cattle) meant summer grazing on mountain pastures and descent before winter to permanent settlements at lower altitudes. The main raw materials in the production of food for livestock farmers were milk and meat, i.e. making butter, cheese and dry meat. Buša have a solid and compact build, so they were used for work. It was used in traditional primitive cattle breeding for all three productions: work, milk and meat.

Buša heifers become sexually mature at two years of age. The calves are very small, with a birth weight of about 15 kg. Fertility is between 85 and 90%. Females stay fertile until an age of twelve years. The life span of the animal is about twenty years.

== Use ==
The cattle are used as draught animals, and for beef and milk production. Although their work capacity is modest, the animals are disease-resistant, well adapted to harsh climate, and require little food. Annual milk yield varies according to region, but is generally in the range 600–1500 kg, with a fat content between 4.05% and 5.6%.

They are robust and frugal, and well adapted to karst landscapes. In the winter the cattle are housed for 2–6 months, in the remaining time they are kept in the open.
