= Albany metropolitan area =

The Albany metropolitan area may refer to:

- Albany metropolitan area, Georgia
- Capital District, New York, also known as the Albany combined statistical area
- Linn County, Oregon, comprises the Albany metropolitan area

== See also ==
- Albany (disambiguation)
