= List of AS Roma players (25–99 appearances) =

This is a list of footballers who have played between 25 and 99 official matches for AS Roma. Generally, this means players that have played one to three season with the club.

For a list of all Roma players, major or minor, with a Wikipedia article, see Category:AS Roma players; for a selected list of the best players in Roma's history, see AS Roma Hall of Fame. For a list of players with more than 100 matches played, see List of AS Roma players.

Players are listed as of 6 March 2018 and according to the date of their first-team debut for the club. Appearances and goals are for first-team competitive matches only; wartime matches are excluded. Substitute appearances included.

== Players ==
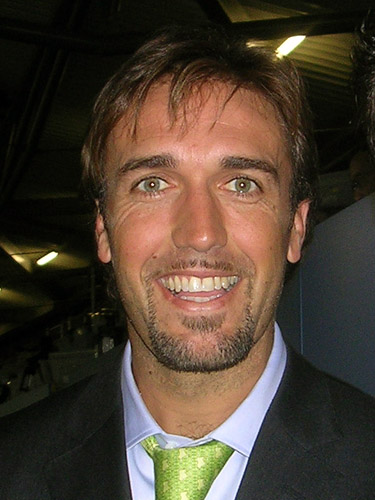
Despite having played only two and a half seasons with Roma, Gabriel Batistuta was inducted into the A.S. Roma Hall of Fame thanks to his great contribution to the Serie A title victory in 2001.

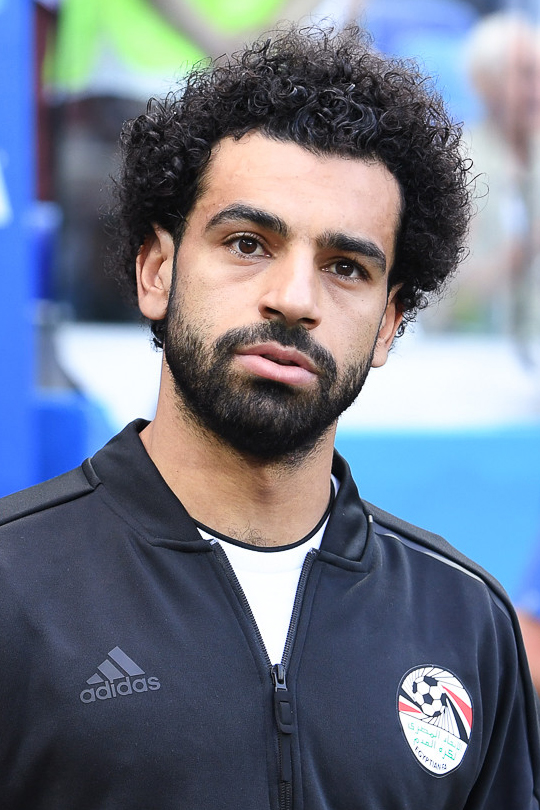
Mohamed Salah played two seasons with Roma, scoring a total of 34 goals. He was sold to Liverpool in 2017 for a then-club record fee of €50 million.

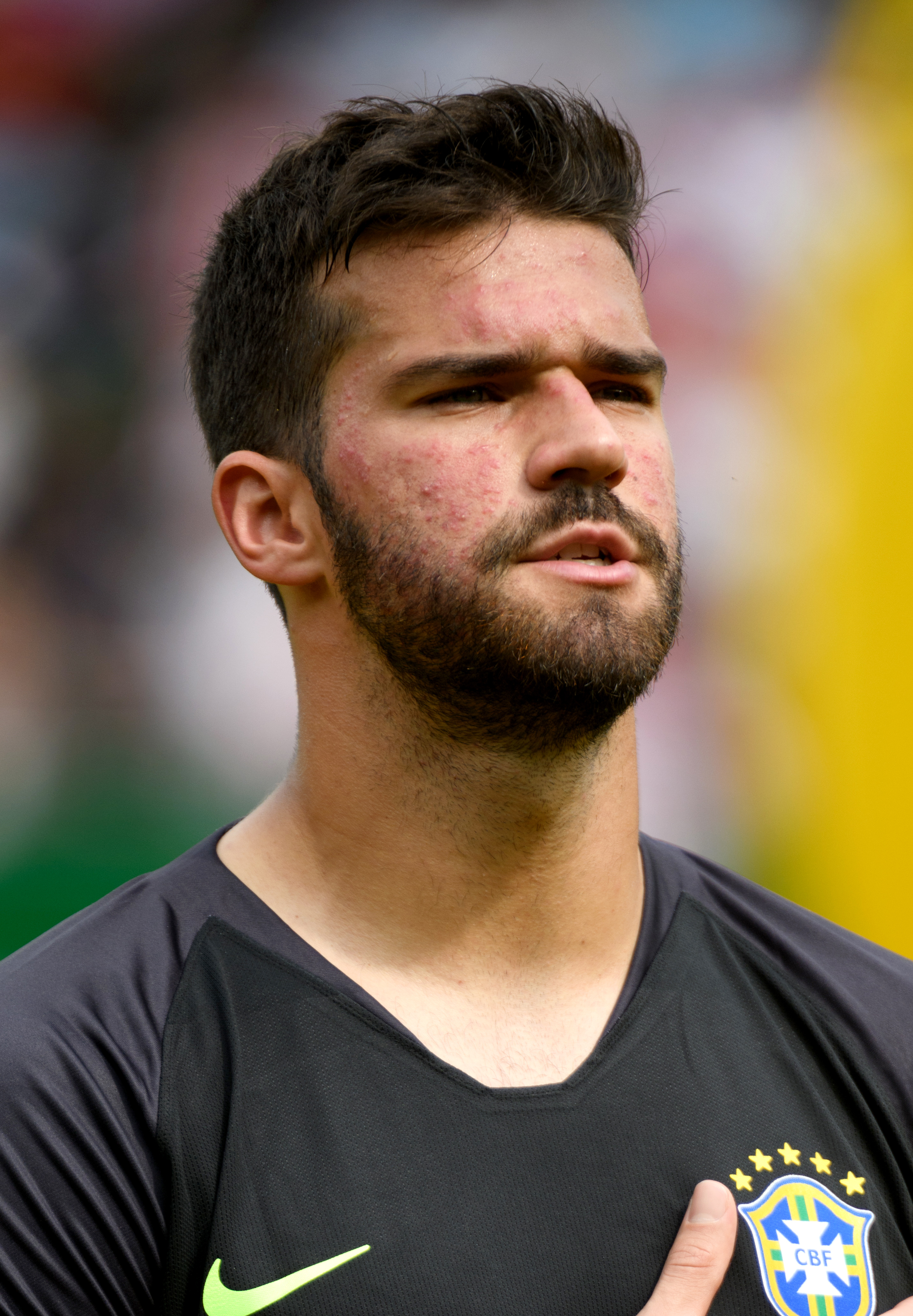
Alisson played 64 matches in two seasons at Roma, helping them reach the semi-finals of the Champions League in 2018. He was sold to Liverpool in 2018 for a club record fee of €62.5 million, also breaking the transfer record for a goalkeeper at the time.

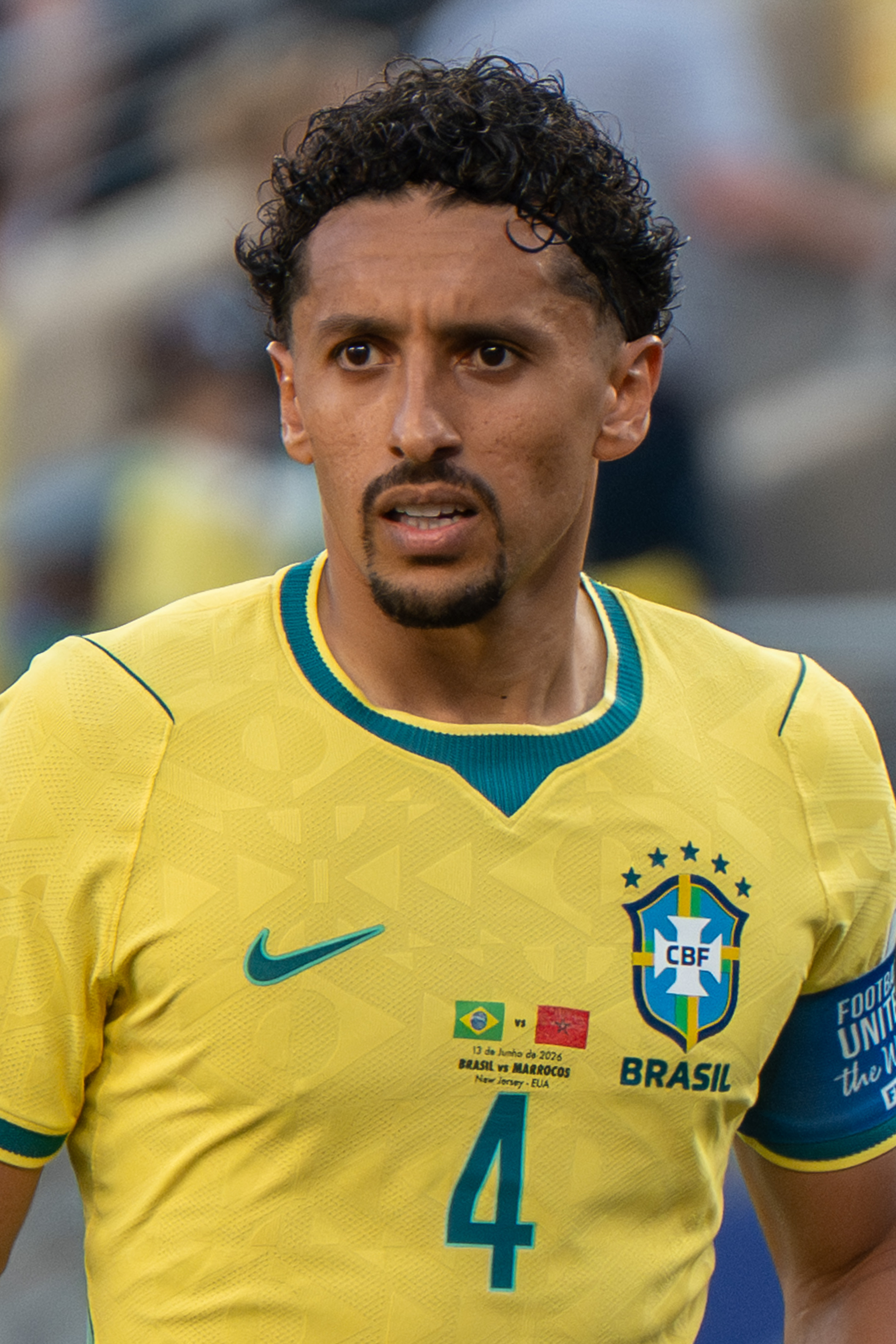
Marquinhos was signed by Roma in 2012 for €3 million and sold the following year to Paris Saint-Germain for €31.4 million after playing 30 matches with the Giallorossi.

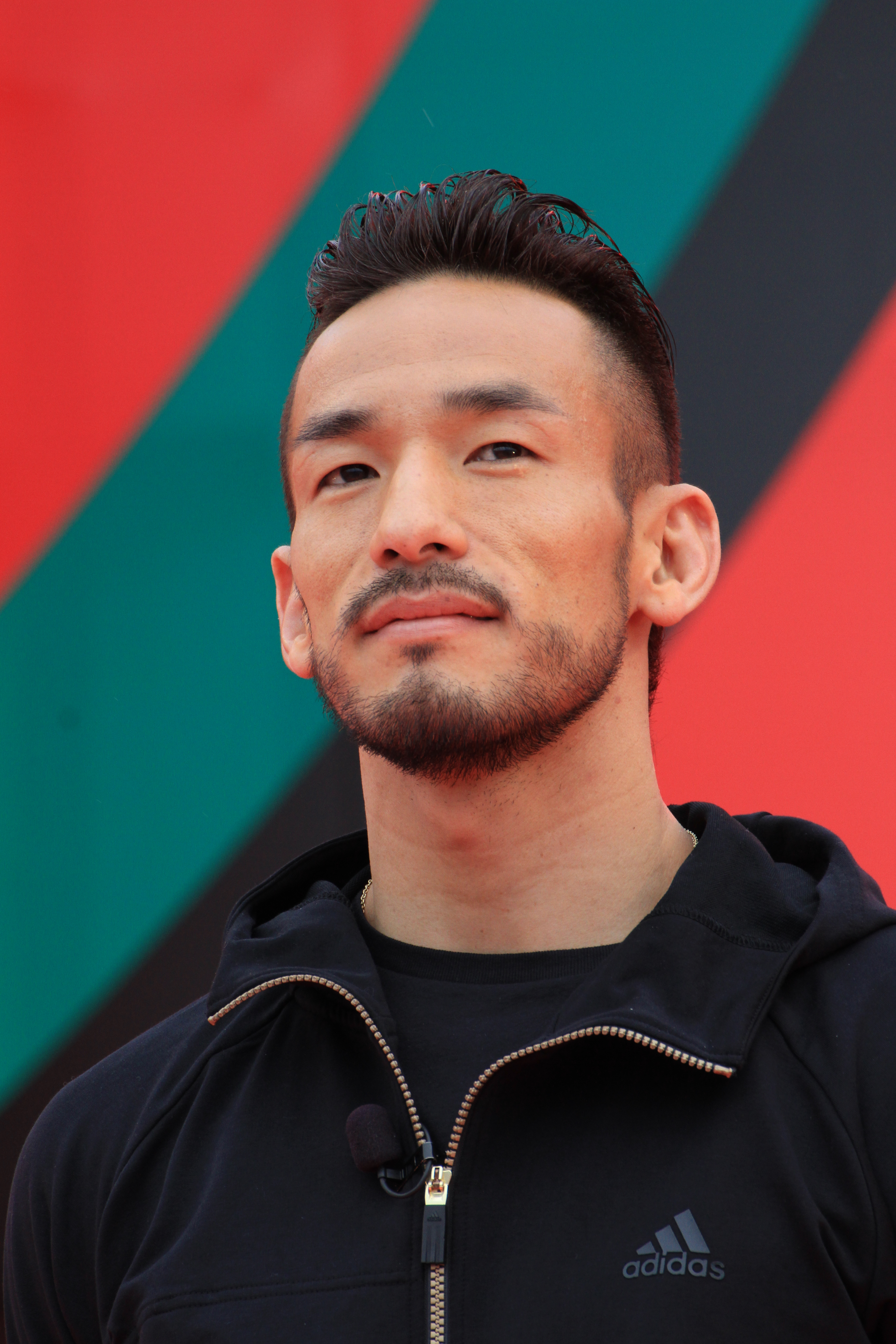
Hidetoshi Nakata played one and a half seasons at Roma, being decisive in winning their 2001 Serie A title thanks to his goal and assist in their 2–2 match against club's rival Juventus.

Nationality column refers to the country (countries) represented internationally by the player, if any.

Last update: 1 August 2019

Name	Nationality	Position	Roma career	Appearances	Goals
Giorgio Carpi	Italy	MF	1927–1936	45	0
Luigi Albani	Italy	GK	1948–1955	78	0
Loris Boni	Italy	MF	1975–1979	99	1
Michele De Nadai	Italy	DF – MF	1977–1981	99	3
Roberto Scarnecchia	Italy	RW	1977–1983	94	3
Maurizio Turone	Italy	DF	1979–1983	93	2
Herbert Prohaska	Austria	MF	1982–1983	43	5
Pietro Vierchowod	Italy	DF	1982–1983	43	0
Michele Nappi	Italy	DF	1982–1984	46	0
Maurizio Iorio	Italy	FW	1982–1983; 1984–1985	63	12
Ciccio Graziani	Italy	RW – FW	1983–1986	97	21
Antonio Comi	Italy	DF	1989–1994	97	4
Silvano Benedetti	Italy	DF	1992–1995	73	6
Alessio Scarchilli	Italy	MF	1993–1994; 1995–1996	32	0
Daniele Beretta	Italy	MF	1993–94; 1995–1997	30	1
Fabrizio Lorieri	Italy	GK	1993–1995	27	0
Francesco Moriero	Italy	MF	1994–1997	88	11
Francesco Statuto	Italy	MF	1994–1997	85	3
Daniel Fonseca	Uruguay	FW	1994–1997	79	28
Enrico Annoni	Italy	RB	1994–1997	73	0
Jonas Thern	Sweden	MF	1996–1997	28	2
Paulo Sérgio	Brazil	FW	1997–1999	64	24
Antonio Chimenti	Italy	GK	1997–1999	45	0
Michael Konsel	Austria	GK	1997–1999	40	0
Carmine Gautieri	Italy	FW	1997–2000	42	8
Dmitri Alenichev	Russia	MF	1998–2000	28	2
Amedeo Mangone	Italy	DF	1999–2001	41	0
Cristiano Zanetti	Italy	MF	1999–2001	40	0
Alessandro Rinaldi	Italy	DF	1999–2001	33	0
Marcos Assunção	Brazil	MF	1999–2002	71	9
Hidetoshi Nakata	Japan	MF	2000–2001	40	6
Gaetano D'Agostino	Italy	MF	2000–2001; 2003–2004	41	0
Gabriel Omar Batistuta	Argentina	FW	2000–2003	83	33
Gianni Guigou	Uruguay	MF	2000–2003	55	3
Diego Fuser	Italy	MF	2001–2003	26	2
Ivan Pelizzoli	Italy	GK	2001–2005	92	0
Cesare Bovo	Italy	DF	2001–02; 2005–2006	37	1
Luigi Sartor	Italy	DF	2002–2003; 2004–2005	27	0
Traianos Dellas	Greece	DF	2002–2005	65	4
John Carew	Norway	FW	2003–2004	29	8
Daniele Corvia	Italy	FW	2003–2005	25	1
Leandro Greco	Italy	MF	2004–2006; 2010–2012	47	1
Aleandro Rosi	Italy	RB	2004–2007; 2010–2012	98	3
Gianluca Curci	Italy	GK	2004–2008; 2011–2012	61	0
Samuel Kuffour	Ghana	DF	2005–2006	31	1
Houssine Kharja	Morocco	MF	2005–2006	25	1
Édgar Álvarez	Honduras	RB-RW	2005–2006; 2007	34	0
Stefano Okaka	Italy	FW	2005–2012	48	4
Ricardo Faty	France	MF	2006–2007; 2009–2010	26	0
Júlio Sérgio	Brazil	GK	2006–2011	61	0
Ludovic Giuly	France	FW	2007–2008	48	8
Cicinho	Brazil	RB	2007–2012	91	3
Júlio Baptista	Brazil	FW	2008–2010	69	15
Bogdan Lobonț	Romania	GK	2009–2018	28	0
Marco Motta	Italy	RB	2009–2010	42	0
Fábio Simplício	Brazil	MF	2010–2012	53	9
Marco Borriello	Italy	FW	2010–2012; 2013–2014	65	18
Bojan Krkić	Spain	FW	2011–2012	37	7
Fernando Gago	Argentina	MF	2011–2012	32	1
Gabriel Heinze	Argentina	DF	2011–2012	32	0
José Ángel	Spain	LB	2011–2012	32	0
Fabio Borini	Italy	FW	2011–2012	26	10
Erik Lamela	Argentina	FW	2011–2013	67	21
Pablo Daniel Osvaldo	Italy; Argentina	FW	2011–2013	58	30
Maarten Stekelenburg	Netherlands	GK	2011–2013	55	0
Iván Piris	Paraguay	RB	2012–2013	32	0
Marquinhos	Brazil	DF	2012–2013	30	0
Marquinho	Brazil	LW	2012–2014	56	7
Michael Bradley	United States	MF	2012–2014	46	2
Dodô	Brazil	LB	2012–2014	35	0
Mattia Destro	Italy	FW	2012–2015	68	29
Federico Balzaretti	Italy	LB	2012–2015	44	2
Leandro Castán	Brazil	DF	2012–2016	81	1
Vasilis Torosidis	Greece	RB	2012–2016	77	7
Mehdi Benatia	Morocco	DF	2013–2014	37	5
Gervinho	Ivory Coast	FW	2013–2016	88	26
Morgan De Sanctis	Italy	GK	2013–2016	79	0
Adem Ljajić	Serbia	FW	2013–2016	75	16
Maicon	Brazil	RB	2013–2016	71	5
Mapou Yanga-Mbiwa	France	DF	2014–2015	38	1
José Holebas	Greece	LB	2014–2015	34	1
Davide Astori	Italy	DF	2014–2015	30	1
Lorenzo Pellegrini	Italy	MF	2014–2015; 2017–	70	7
Seydou Keita	Mali	MF	2014–2016	52	4
Juan Iturbe	Argentina	FW	2014–2017	68	5
Leandro Paredes	Argentina	MF	2014–2017	54	4
Lucas Digne	France	LB	2015–2016	42	3
Iago Falque	Spain	FW	2015–2016	27	3
Mohamed Salah	Egypt	FW	2015–2017	83	34
Wojciech Szczęsny	Poland	GK	2015–2017	81	0
Antonio Rüdiger	Germany	DF	2015–2017	72	2
Emerson	Italy; Brazil	LB	2015–2017	47	2
Bruno Peres	Brazil	RB	2016–	69	2
Juan Jesus	Brazil	DF	2016–	86	1
Alisson	Brazil	GK	2016–2018	64	0
Gerson	Brazil	FW	2016–2019	42	2
Patrik Schick	Czech Republic	FW	2017–	58	8
Cengiz Ünder	Turkey	RW	2017–	65	14
Nicolò Zaniolo	Italy	MF	2017–	36	6
Justin Kluivert	Netherlands	MF	2017–	35	2
Steven Nzonzi	France	MF	2017–	39	1

== Key ==
- GK – Goalkeeper
- SW – Sweeper
- RB – Right back
- LB – Left back
- DF – Defender
- MF – Midfielder
- RW – Right winger
- LW – Left winger
- FW – Forward
