= St. Albans (disambiguation) =

St Albans or Saint Albans (including variations in punctuation) is a placename in several countries, ultimately derived from the name of Saint Alban. St. Albans or Saint Albans can refer to:

== Populated places ==
=== Australia ===
- St Albans, Victoria, a suburb of Melbourne
  - Electoral district of St Albans, an electoral district of the Victorian Legislative Assembly.
  - St Albans railway station, Melbourne
- St Albans Park, Victoria, a suburb of Geelong
- St Albans, New South Wales, a town in New South Wales
- St. Albans Campus, Victoria University, Melbourne

=== Canada ===
- St. Alban's, Newfoundland and Labrador
- Saint-Alban, Quebec

=== New Zealand ===
- St Albans, New Zealand, a suburb of Christchurch

=== United Kingdom ===
- St Albans, the main urban area in the City and District of St Albans
  - St Albans City and District, an administrative district in Hertfordshire, England
  - St Albans (UK Parliament constituency)
  - Duke of St. Albans
- St Albans, Nottinghamshire, a civil parish
- St Alban's Head, an outcrop of Portland Stone on the coast of Dorset, England
- St Alban's (ward), an electoral ward in the London Borough of Havering

=== United States ===
- St. Albans, Maine, a town located in Somerset County
- St. Albans, Missouri, a town in East Central Missouri
- St. Albans, Queens, a residential community in the borough of Queens, New York City
- St. Albans (town), Vermont, a town located in Franklin County that surrounds the city of the same name
- St. Albans (city), Vermont, a city located in Franklin County
  - St. Albans Raid, the northernmost engagement of the American Civil War occurred here
- St. Albans, West Virginia, a city located in Kanawha County

== Other ==
- St. Alban's Church (disambiguation)
- St. Albans School (disambiguation)
- St Albans railway station (disambiguation)
- SS St. Albans Victory, US cargo ship used as troop transport at end of WWII

== See also ==
- Alban (disambiguation)
- Saint-Alban (disambiguation)
