= Silvia Albano =

Silvia Albano may refer to:

- Silvia Albano (judge)
- Silvia Albano (tennis player)
