= Albano (name) =

Albano is both a given name and a surname. Notable people with the name include:

== Given name ==
- Albano (1922–1990), Portuguese footballer
- Albano (born 1997), Brazilian footballer
- Albano Albanese (1921–2010), Italian hurdler and high jumper
- Albano Aleksi (born 1992), Albanian footballer
- Albano Bizzarri (born 1977), Argentine footballer
- Albano Bortoletto Cavallin (1930–2017), Brazilian Roman Catholic prelate
- Albano Carrisi (born 1943), Italian singer with the stage name Albano or Al Bano
- Albano Contarini, Venetian nobleman and governor of Athens (1395–1397)
- Albano Harguindeguy (1927–2012), Argentine Army general and Interior Minister
- Albano Lugli (1834–1914), Italian painter and ceramic artist
- Albano Mucci (born 1968), Welsh environmental and animal conservationist and social justice activist
- Albano Olivetti (born 1991), French tennis player
- Albano Pera (born 1950), Italian sports shooter
- Albano Sorbelli (1875–1944), Italian historian, bibliographer, and librarian
- Albano Vicariotto (1931–2019), Italian footballer

== Surname ==
- Elías Fernández Albano (1845–1910), Chilean politician, briefly acting president of Chile
- Francesco Albani or Albano (1578–1660), Italian Baroque painter
- Leandro Albano (born 1992), Portuguese footballer
- Lou Albano (1933–2009), professional wrestler
- Lucia Albano (born 1965), Italian politician
- Michael Albano (born 1950), American politician
- Miriam Albano (born 1991), Italian opera mezzo-soprano
- Nelson Albano (born 1954), American politician
- Pablo Albano (born 1967), Argentine retired tennis player
- Rodolfo Albano Jr. (1934–2019), Filipino lawyer and politician
- Rodolfo Albano III (born 1959), Filipino politician
- Silvia Albano (judge), Italian judge
- Silvia Albano (tennis player) (born 1994), Italian tennis player
- Wendy Albano (died 2012), American woman who was murdered in Bangkok
- Tonypet Albano (born 1965), Filipino politician
