= St. Alban's Church =

This is a list of things called St. Alban's Church:

== Australia ==
- Anglican Church of St Alban the Martyr, Kalangadoo, South Australia
- Anglican Church of St Alban the Martyr, Lyons, Australian Capital Territory
- Anglican Church of St Alban the Martyr, St Albans, New South Wales
- Anglican Church of St Alban, Marradong, Western Australia
- Cathedral Church of St Alban the Martyr, Griffith, New South Wales
- Multicultural Bible Ministry (MBM) St Albans Anglican Church, Rooty Hill, New South Wales
- St Alban's Anglican Church, Boggabilla, New South Wales
- St Alban's Anglican Church, Exeter, New South Wales
- St Alban's Anglican Church, Lindfield, New South Wales
- St Alban's Anglican Church, Leura, New South Wales
- St Alban's Anglican Church, Largs Bay, South Australia
- St Alban's Anglican Church, Muswellbrook, New South Wales
- St Alban's Anglican Chapel at The Southport School, Southport, Queensland
- St Alban's, Five Dock, Sydney, New South Wales
- Liberal Catholic Church of St Alban, Spring Hill, Brisbane, Queensland
- Liberal Catholic Church of St Francis and St Alban, Gordon, Sydney, New South Wales

== Canada ==
=== Alberta ===
- St. Albans Anglican Church, Brooks

=== British Columbia ===
- St. Albans Anglican Church, Ashcroft
- St. Alban Anglican Church, Burnaby
- St. Alban Anglican Church, Richmond

=== Manitoba ===
- St. Alban's Anglican Church, Winnipeg

=== New Brunswick ===
- St. Alban's Church, the Anglican Parish of New Bandon, Diocese of Fredericton
- St Alban's Anglican Church, Salmon Beach

=== Newfoundland ===
- St Alban's Anglican Church, Grand Falls-Windsor
- Saint Alban the Martyr Anglican Church, Gooseberry Cove
- Saint Alban's Anglican Church, New-Wes-Valley

=== Nova Scotia ===
- St. Alban's Church, Sydney

=== Ontario ===
- St. Alban's Cathedral, Kenora
- St Alban's Anglican Church, Ottawa
- Cathedral of St. Alban the Martyr, Toronto (1883–1936) – ceased use as a cathedral in 1936 and sold for use as a chapel for Royal St. George's College
- St Albans Anglican Church, Grand Valley
- St. Alban the Martyr Anglican Church, Georgetown
- St. Alban's Anglican Church, Stella, Ontario on Amherst Island
- St. Alban's Anglican Church, Acton
- St. Alban's Anglican Church, Lincoln
- St. Alban's Anglican Church, Restoule
- St. Alban's Anglican Church, Capreol
- St. Alban's Anglican Church, Mattawa
- Saint Alban the Martyr Anglican Church, Greater Napanee

=== Prince Edward Island ===
- St. Alban's Church, Anglican, Souris

=== Saskatchewan ===
- St. Alban's Cathedral (Prince Albert)

=== Quebec ===
- Fabrique de la Paroisse de Saint-Alban (Le), Saint-Alban

== Denmark ==
- St. Alban's Church, Copenhagen, the only Anglican church in Copenhagen
- St. Alban's Church, Odense, Roman Catholic parish church

== France ==
- St Alban's Anglican Church, Strasbourg
- Church of Saint Alban, Elven

== Germany ==
- Saint Alban's Abbey, Mainz
- Alt St. Alban
- Wehrkirche St. Alban und St. Wendelin, Morsbach (Künzelsau)
- Benediktinerinnen von St. Alban, Dießen am Ammersee
- Catholic Church of St. Alban, Bad Krozingen
- Catholic Church of St. Alban, Heilbronn
- St. Alban Church, Wallerstein
- Wallfahrtskirche St. Alban, Aitrang
- Church of St. Alban, Buchloe
- Church of St. Alban, Walkertshofen
- St. Albani, Göttingen

== Ghana ==
- St. Alban Anglican Church, Tema

== Grenada ==
- St. Alban's Anglican Church, Mount Moritz, Saint George Parish, Grenada

== Guatemala ==
- St. Alban's Anglican/Episcopal Mission, Antigua Guatemala

== India ==
- St. Albans CSI Anglican Church, Kottayam

== Japan ==
- Saint Alban's Anglican-Episcopal Church, Minato City
- St. Alban Church, Tochigi
- St. Alban's by St. Andrew's, Tokyo

== Kenya ==
- ACK St. Alban's Church, Molo
- ACK St. Alban Parish Makadara, Nairobi

== Malaysia ==
- St. Alban Anglican Church, Sarawak

== New Zealand ==
- St Alban's Anglican Church, Lower Hutt
- St Albans Baptist Church, Christchurch
- St Alban's Uniting Church, Christchurch
- St Alban's Anglican Church, Appleby
- St Alban's Church, Eastbourne
- St Alban's Church, Pauatahanui, Wellington
- St Alban's Church, Porirua
- St Alban's Church, Waingaro
- St Alban the Martyr Anglican Church, Balmoral
- St Albans Presbyterian Church, Palmerston North
- Chartwell Cooperating Church of St. Alban's, Hamilton

== Nigeria ==
- St Alban's Anglican Church, Degema

== Philippines ==
- Saint Alban Episcopal Church, Episcopal Diocese of North Central Philippines, Mankayan

== Solomon Islands ==
- St Alban Church, Honiara

== South Africa ==
- St Alban's Anglican Church, Kimberley
- St Albans Anglican Church, Benoni
- St Albans Anglican Church, Johannesburg
- St. Alban's Church, East London
- St Albans Cathedral, Pretoria
- St Albans Liberal Catholic Church, Johannesburg
- St. Alban the Martyr Anglican Cathedral, Pretoria

== Switzerland ==
- St. Alban's Church, Basel, a Serbian Orthodox church with sacral predecessors dating back to 1083

== United Kingdom ==
=== England ===
- St Alban's Church, Acton Green, London
- St Alban the Martyr, Birmingham
- St Alban's Church, Blackburn, Lancashire
- St Alban's Church, Bournemouth, Dorset
- St Alban's Church, Broadheath, Altrincham, Greater Manchester
- St Alban's, Cheam, London
- St Alban's Church, Forest Town, Nottinghamshire
- St Alban's Church, Frant, East Sussex
- St Alban's Church, Ilford, London
- Garrison Church of St Alban the Martyr, Larkhill, Wiltshire
- London (central)
  - St Alban, Wood Street
  - St Alban's Church, Holborn
- St Alban's Church, Macclesfield, Cheshire
- St Alban's Catholic Church, North Finchley, London
- St Albans Cathedral, St Albans, Hertfordshire
- St Alban and St Stephen's Church, St Albans
- St Alban's Church, Sneinton, Nottingham
- St Alban's Church, Southampton
- St Alban's Church, Tattenhall, Cheshire
- St Alban's Church, Teddington, London
- St Mary with St Alban, Teddington, London
- St Alban's Church, Upton Park, London
- St Alban's Church, Wallasey, Merseyside
- St Alban's Church, Warrington, Cheshire
- St Albans, West Leigh, Diocese of Portsmouth

=== Wales ===
- St Alban's Church, Llanelli

== United States ==
- St Alban's Anglican Catholic Church, Richmond, Virginia
- St Albans Church of God, St. Paul, Minnesota
- St. Albans Chapel, Baton Rouge, Louisiana
- Church of St Alban, Philadelphia, Pennsylvania
- St. Albans Open Air Chapel, Albany County, Wyoming
- St. Alban's Catholic Church, Rochester, New York
- St. Alban's Church, also known as the First Reformed Episcopal Church, New York City
- St. Albans Church, Brandywine Hundred, New Castle County, Delaware
- St. Alban's Episcopal Church (disambiguation)

== See also ==
- Saint-Alban (disambiguation)
- St. Albans (disambiguation)
- Saint Alban
