= Johannes Jacobus Rau =

Dutch physician

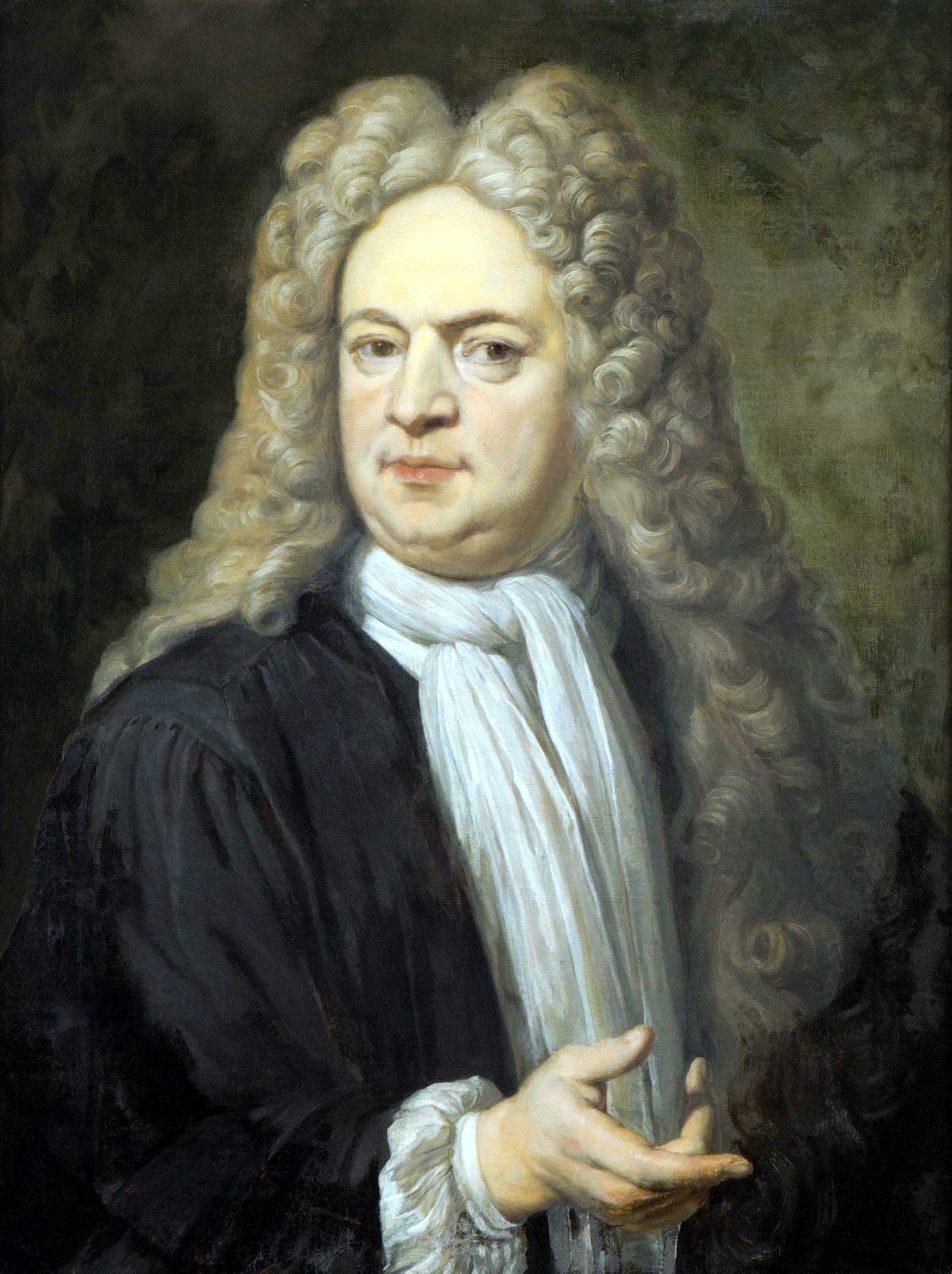

Johann Jakob Rau Latinized as Johannes Jacobus Rau (with the variants Rouw or Ravius) (1668 – 18 September 1719) was a Dutch surgeon and anatomist who made advances in lithotomy or the treatment of urinary stones.

Rau was born in Baden-Baden, to wine merchant Johannes and Magdalena Muller. He then worked with a surgeon in Strassburg (or Regensburg as given in some sources) and later assisted a surgeon in Bergen, Norway. He then served on a naval ship Graaf van Bentheim and returned to study medicine. He studied surgery in Leiden and Paris and defended his doctoral dissertation in 1694. He then worked in Amsterdam where he worked with Frederik Ruysch and developed his own surgical technique for lithotomy. It was a period when procedures were secret and lithotomists gained considerable reputation or fell in favour due to failures. Rau's lateral approach technique made him the principal lithotomist of the period, displacing the travelling Frenchman Jacques Beaulieu (1651 – 1719) who called himself Frère Jacques. Lorenz Heister learned the technique and others spread this method around Europe. In 1713, he was given the post of professor of medicine at the University of Leiden. In 1719, he was dismissed from professorship following mental illness. He was succeeded by Bernard Siegfried Albinus.
