= Albanians (disambiguation) =

Albanians may refer to:

- in terms of ethnicity: Albanians, a people in Southeastern Europe
- in terms of citizenship: Albanians, citizens of Albania
- Caucasian Albanians, a distinctive group in the Caucasian region
- Albanians, a demonym for inhabitants of various places called Albany etc.

== See also ==
- Albany (disambiguation)
- Albania (disambiguation)
- Albanian (disambiguation)
