= Alban (surname) =

Alban is a surname. Notable people with the surname include:

- Carlo Alban (born 1979), Ecuadorian actor
- Dick Alban (1929–2016), American football player
- Fernando Albán (born 1962), Venezuelan politician
- Frank Alban (born 1949), Australian politician
- James S. Alban, American politician
- Juan Alban, Australian musician
- Laureano Albán (1942–2022), Costa Rican writer
- Mark Alban (born 1966), English cricketer
- Pushpa Leela Alban, Indian politician
- Robert Alban (born 1952), French cyclist
- V. Alban, Indian politician
