= Jan Wandelaar =

Dutch painter

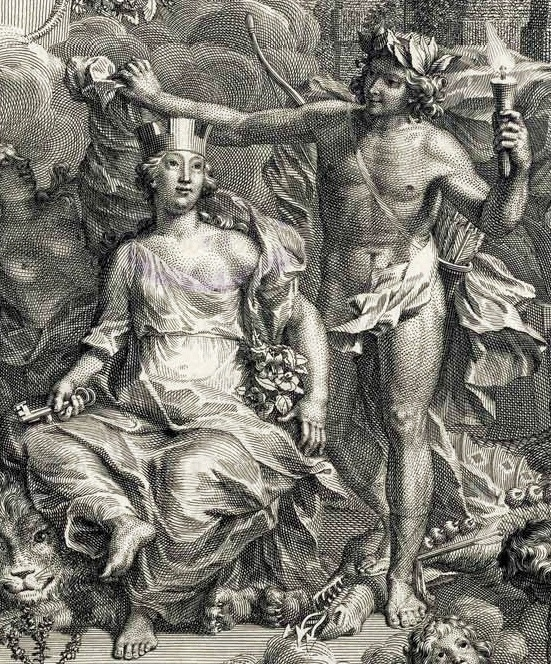
Frontispiece to Carl Linnaeus: Hortus Cliffortianus, Amsterdam, 1737

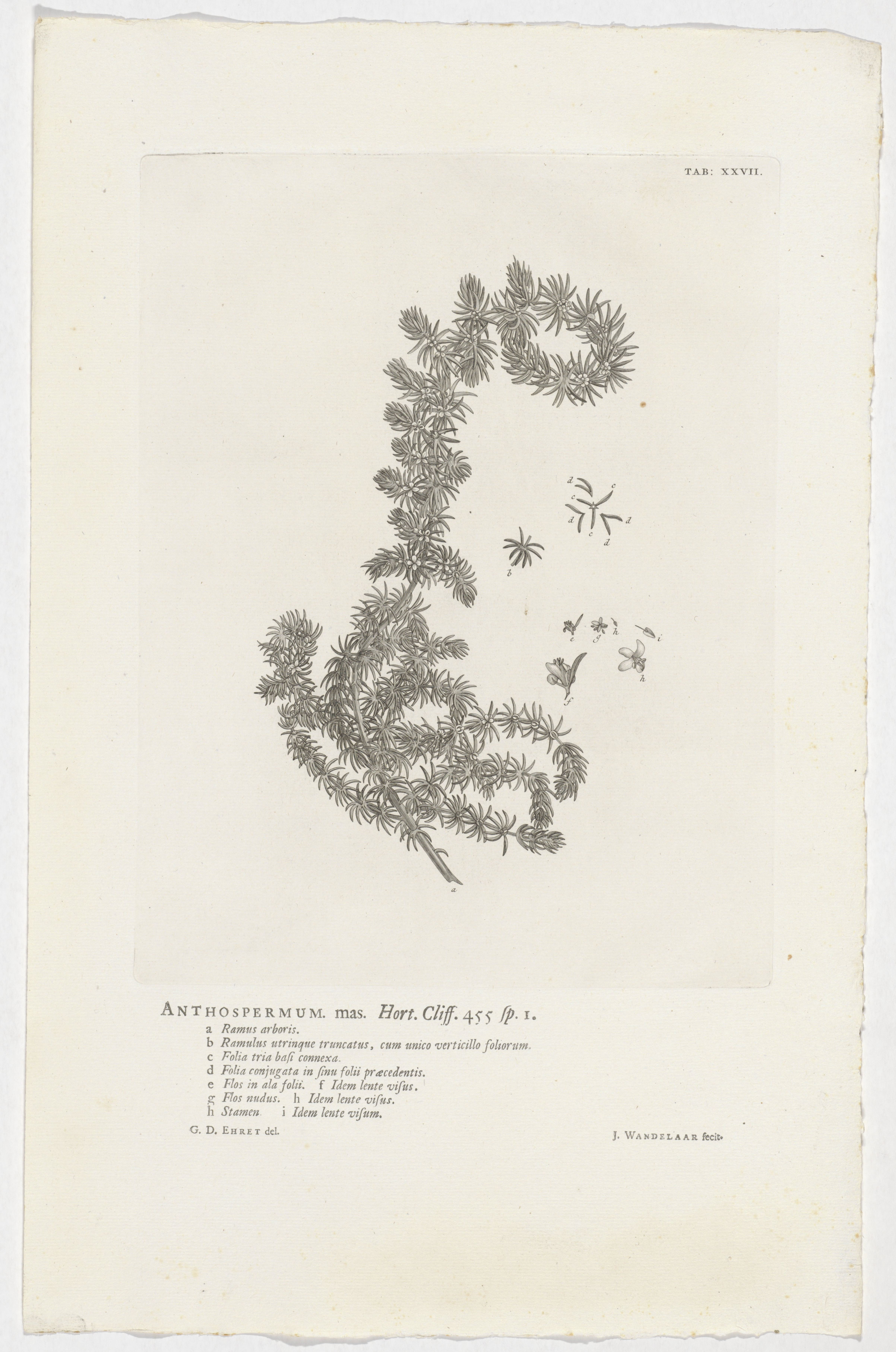
Wandelaar and Ehret: Anthospermum aethiopicum from Linnaeus: Hortus Cliffortianus, 1737

Jan Wandelaar (14 April 1690 – 26 March 1759) was an 18th-century painter, illustrator and engraver from the Dutch Republic.

== Biography ==
Wandelaar was born in Amsterdam. He trained under Jacob Folkema, Gilliam van der Gouwen, and Gerard de Lairesse, and made a name in anatomical art after drawing for Frederik Ruysch. He taught Pieter Lyonet and Abraham Delfos. He was due to work for Arend Cant who died before work could begin. According to Johan van Gool he engraved paintings by Huchtenburg.

He illustrated and engraved the images for Bernhard Siegfried Albinus's Tabulae sceleti et musculorum corporis humani. The second London edition of 1749 featured a human skeleton image now with added illustrations of the rhinoceros Clara in the background.

Wandelaar died in Leiden in 1759.

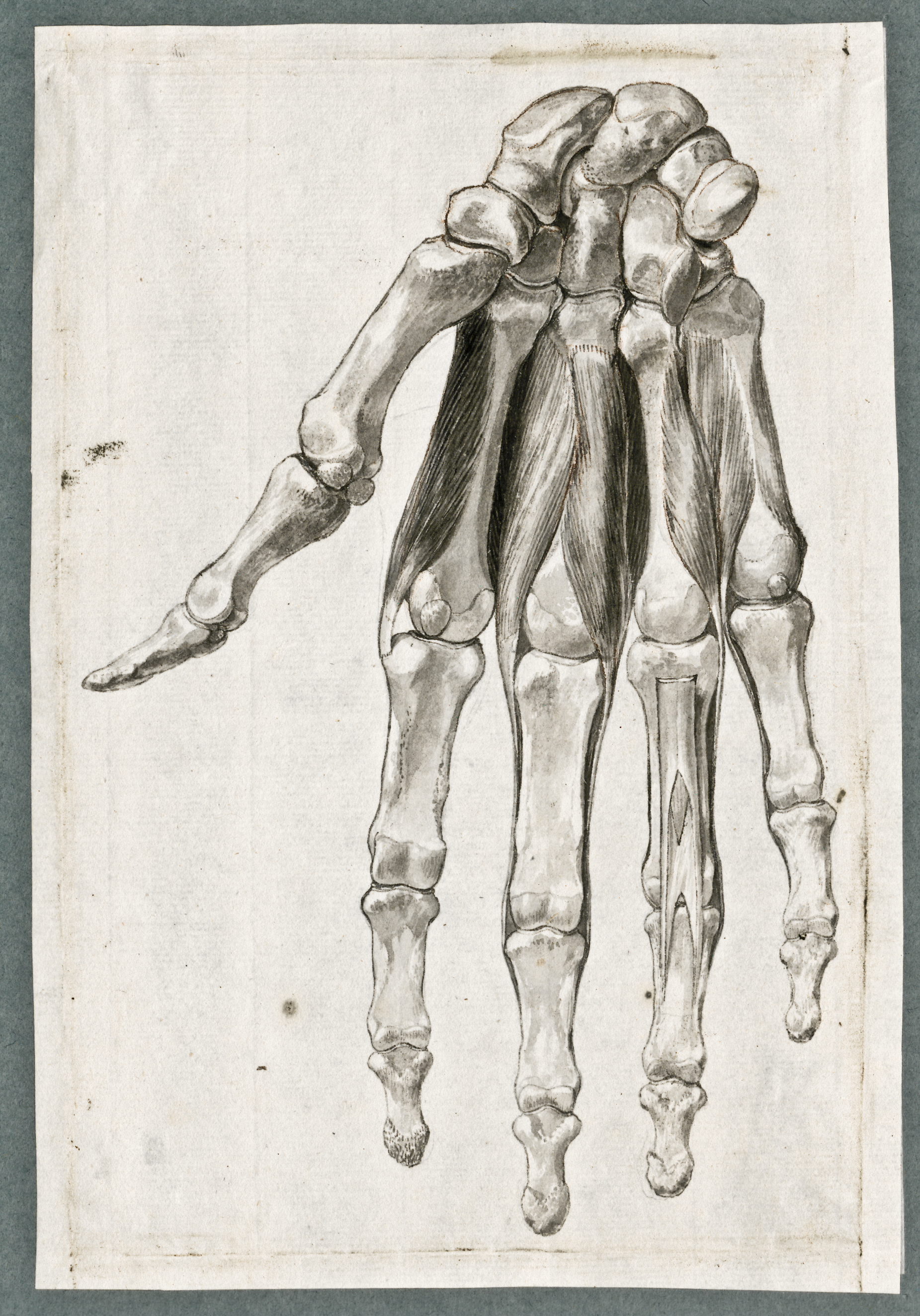
Jan Wandelaar: Human hand muscles. Drawing for Albinus, Tabulae, 1747. Leiden University Library.

Jan Wandelaar: A human skeleton. Drawing for Albinus, Tabulae, 1747. Leiden University Library.

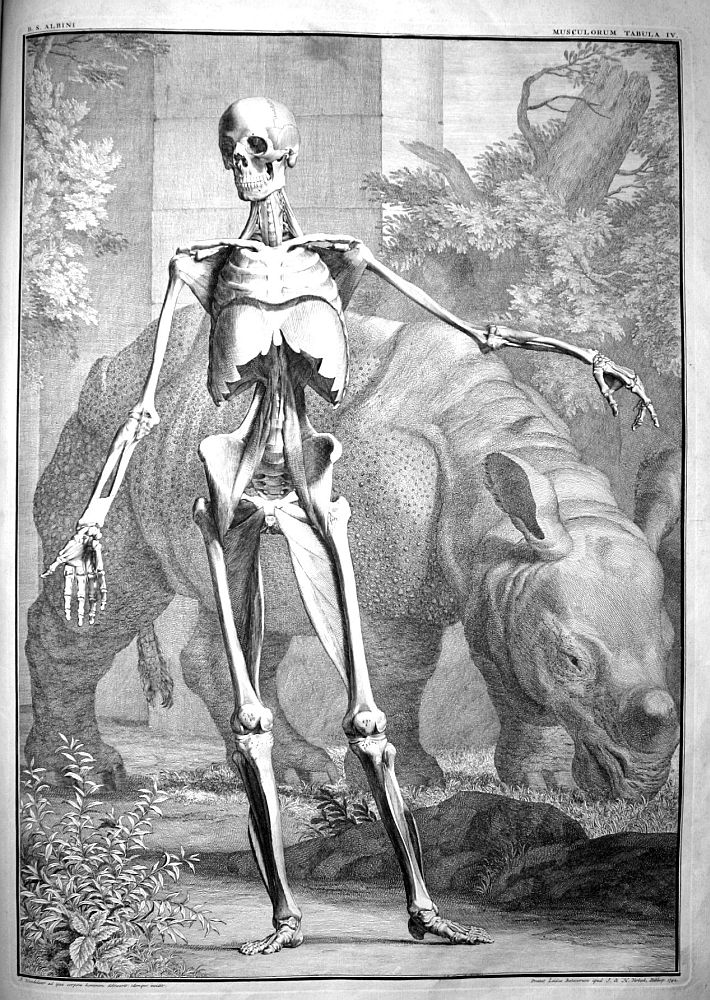
Jan Wandelaar: A human skeleton with rhinoceros Clara
