= St. Alban's Episcopal Church =

St. Alban's Episcopal Church may refer to:

- St. Alban's Episcopal Church (Bovina, Mississippi)
- St. Alban's Episcopal Church (Lidgerwood, North Dakota)
- St. Alban's Episcopal Church (Littleton, North Carolina)
- St. Alban's Episcopal Church (Los Angeles, California)
- St. Alban's Episcopal Church (Staten Island, New York)
- St. Alban's Episcopal Church (Washington, D.C.)

== See also ==
- St. Alban's Church (disambiguation)
