= Albanian Prespa cattle =

Breed of cattle

The Albanian Prespa is a breed of cattle, originally from Albania. They are generally used as a draught animal and for dairy production and have been referred to as a dwarf variant of Buša cattle.
