= Christiaan Bernhard Albinus =

German-Dutch anatomist (d. 1752)

Christiaan Bernhard Albinus (20 March 1698/19 March 1699 – 5 April 1752) was a German-Dutch anatomist, son of the anatomist Bernhardus Albinus and brother of the brother of Bernhard Siegfried Albinus (1697–1770) and Frederick Bernhard Albinus (1715–1778). He served as a professor of anatomy at the University of Utrecht.

Albinus was born in Berlin and studied at the University of Leiden. He received his medical degree in 1772 and was appointed the next year in the University of Utrecht, becoming a professor there in 1724. He was involved in producing a second edition of William Cowper's anatomic atlas. He left anatomy in 1747 to become a magistrate in Utrecht.

His publications include:

- Specimen inaugurale [anatomicum] exhibens nova teniuium hominis intestinorum descriptionem (Leiden, 1722; repr, 1724)
- Oratio inauguralis de anatome prodente errores in medici (Utrecht, 1723) alternate title De anatome errores detegente in medicina
- Edited: William Cowper, The Anatomy of Humane Bodies, With Figures Drawn After the Life by Some of the Best Masters in Europe etc. (Leiden, 1737).
