= Albano (Stockholm) =

Area in Stockholm, Sweden

Coordinates: 59°21′19.75″N 18°3′25.49″E

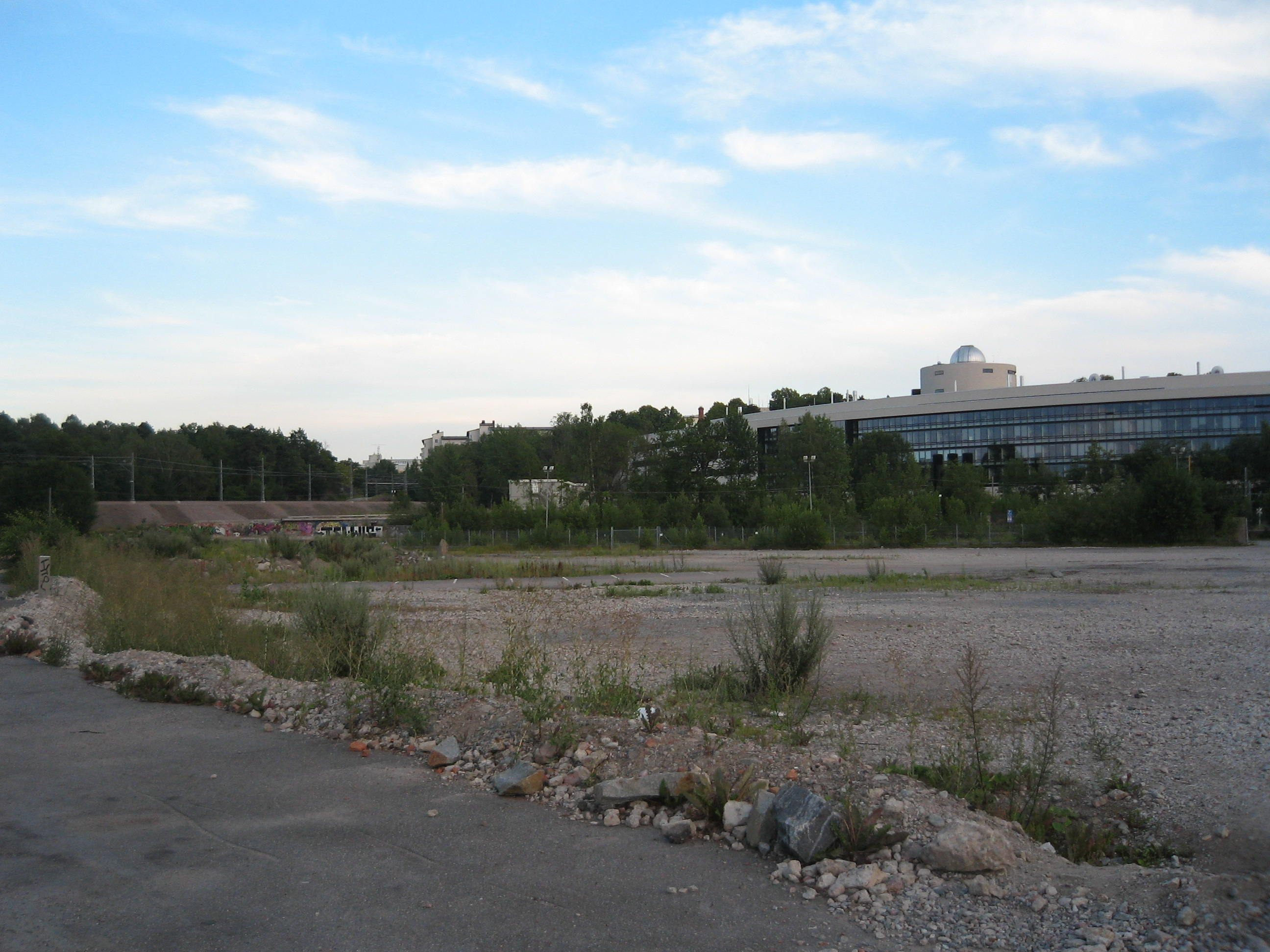
Albano Industry Area in July 2006, when most of the buildings had been torn down. In the background is AlbaNova.

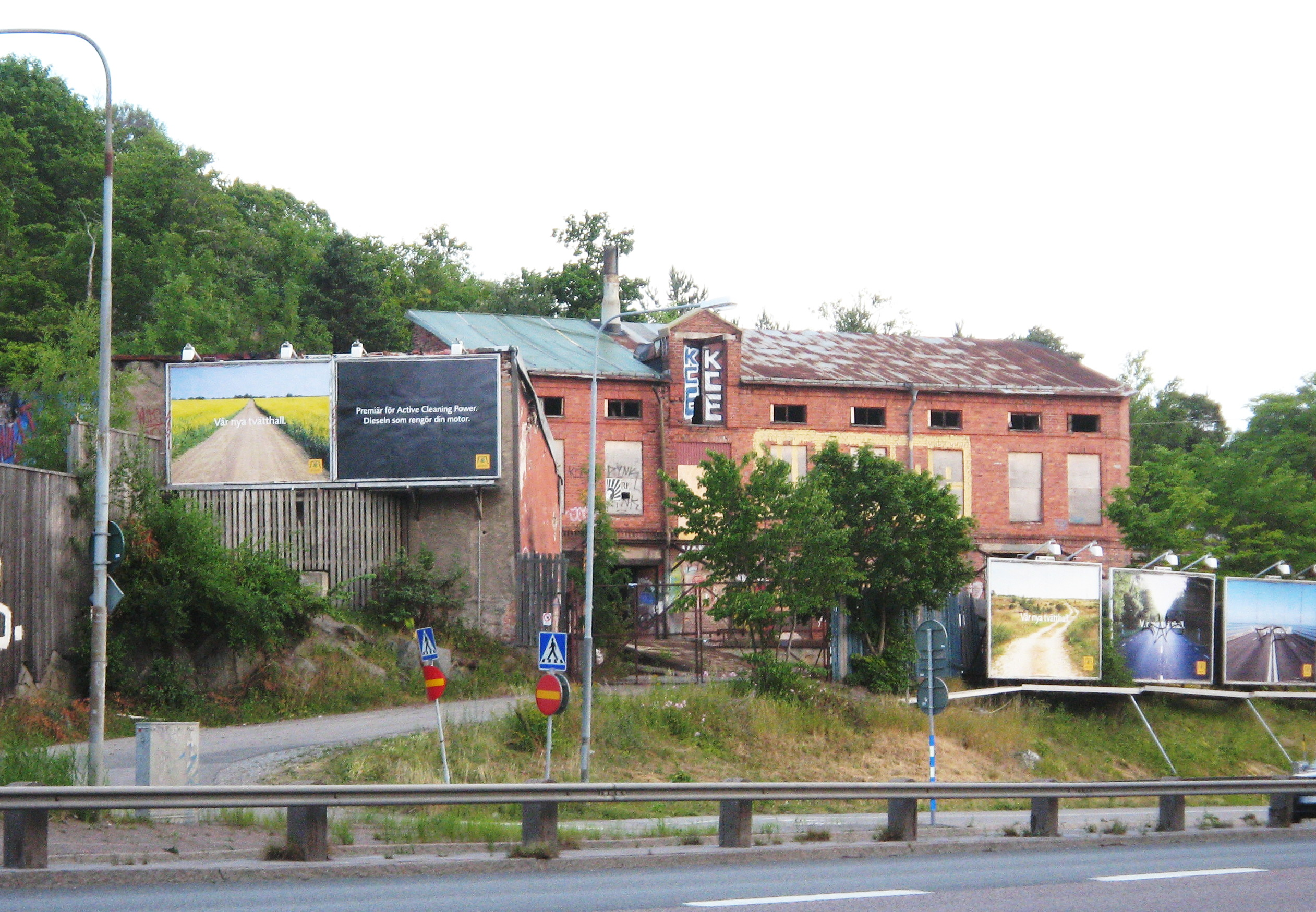
One of the few remaining industrial buildings, however empty.

Albano is an area in Stockholm, Sweden. It had been known as an industrial area during the 20th century but is now incorporated into the Stockholm University campus.

Albano used to have a railway station at Värtabanan with a connection to Roslagsbanan.
