= Albany Township =

Albany Township may refer to:

- Albany Township, Nevada County, Arkansas
- Albany Township, Whiteside County, Illinois
- Albany Township, Stearns County, Minnesota
- Albany Township, Harlan County, Nebraska
- Albany Township, Berks County, Pennsylvania
- Albany Township, Bradford County, Pennsylvania
