= Bernhard Siegfried Albinus =

German-born Dutch anatomist

Bernhard Siegfried Albinus FRS
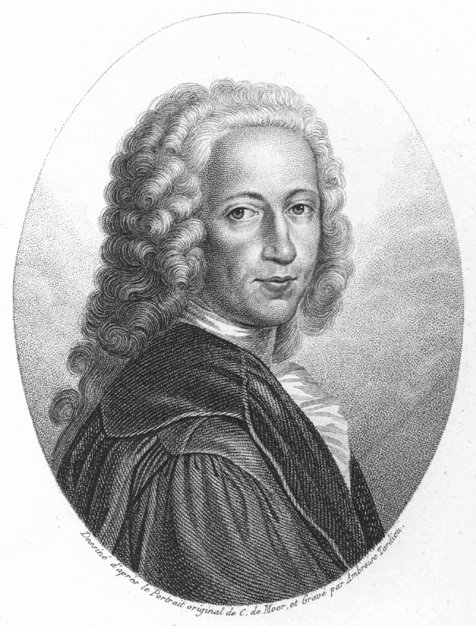
- Drawn after the original Portrait of Carel Isaak de Moor, and engraved by Ambroise Tardieu
- Born: Bernhard Siegfried Weiss; 24 February 1697; Frankfurt (Oder), Holy Roman Empire
- Died: 9 September 1770 (aged 73); Leiden, Dutch Republic
- Education: Leiden University
- Scientific career
- Fields: Anatomy
- Workplaces: Leiden University
- Doctoral students: Gerard van Swieten

Bernhard Siegfried Albinus (originally Weiss; 24 February 1697 – 9 September 1770) was a German-born Dutch anatomist. He served a professor of medicine at the University of Leiden like his father Bernhard Albinus (1653–1721). He also published a large-format artistic atlas of human anatomy, with engravings made by Jan Wandelaar.

== Biography ==
Bernhard Siegfried Albinus was born at Frankfurt on the Oder where his father, Bernhard Albinus (1653–1721), was professor of the practice of medicine. In 1702 the latter was transferred to the chair of medicine at Leiden University, and it was there that Bernhard Siegfried began his studies in 1709, at the age of 12, having for his teachers such men as Boerhaave and Govert Bidloo. Having finished his studies at Leiden, he went to Paris in 1718, where, under the instruction of Sébastien Vaillant (1669–1722), Jacob Winslow (1669–1760) and Frederik Ruysch, he devoted himself especially to anatomy and botany. After a year's absence he was, on the recommendation of Boerhaave, recalled in 1719 to Leiden to be a lecturer on anatomy and surgery. Two years later, after Johannes Jacobus Rau (1668 - 1719) the former rector of the medical school died on 29 June 1719, Albinus received his position in 1721, and succeeded his father in the professorship of these subjects, and became a teacher of anatomy, his classroom being resorted to not only by students but by many practising physicians. In 1745 Albinus was appointed professor of the practice of medicine, being succeeded in the anatomical chair by his brother Frederick Bernhard (1715–1778), who, as well as another brother, Christian Bernhard (1700–1752), attained distinction. Bernhard Siegfried, who was twice rector of his university, died at Leiden.

Together with Hermann Boerhaave, he edited the works of the physicians Andreas Vesalius and William Harvey. Albinus is known for his Tabulae sceleti et musculorum corporis humani, an exquisitely illustrated volume, which was first published in Leiden in 1747, largely at his own expense. Albinus is thought to have spent 24000 florins for the work. The artist and engraver with whom Albinus did nearly all of his work was Jan Wandelaar (1690–1759). From 1746 until his death, Wandelaar lived in Albinus's house. In an attempt to increase the scientific accuracy of anatomical illustration, Albinus and Wandelaar devised a new technique of placing nets with square webbing at specified intervals between the artist and the anatomical specimen and copying the images using the grid patterns. Albinus believed in the idea of "homo perfectus", an idealized perfect human model based on which all humans were derived as variants. In order to represent this perfect human, the illustrations were drawn from multiple specimens. Earlier anatomical drawings such as those accompanying Vesalius' work were drawn from single specimens. Albinus preferred athletic slender forms. Tabulae was criticized by such scholars as Petrus Camper, especially for the whimsical backgrounds added to many of the pieces by Wandelaar, but Albinus staunchly defended Wandelaar. Wandelaar made the first of the plates in 1742, well before the publication of the Tabulae, and this included the skeleton superposed in front of a rhinoceros. This was the famous rhinoceros Clara which at that time lived in Leiden and was extremely popular.

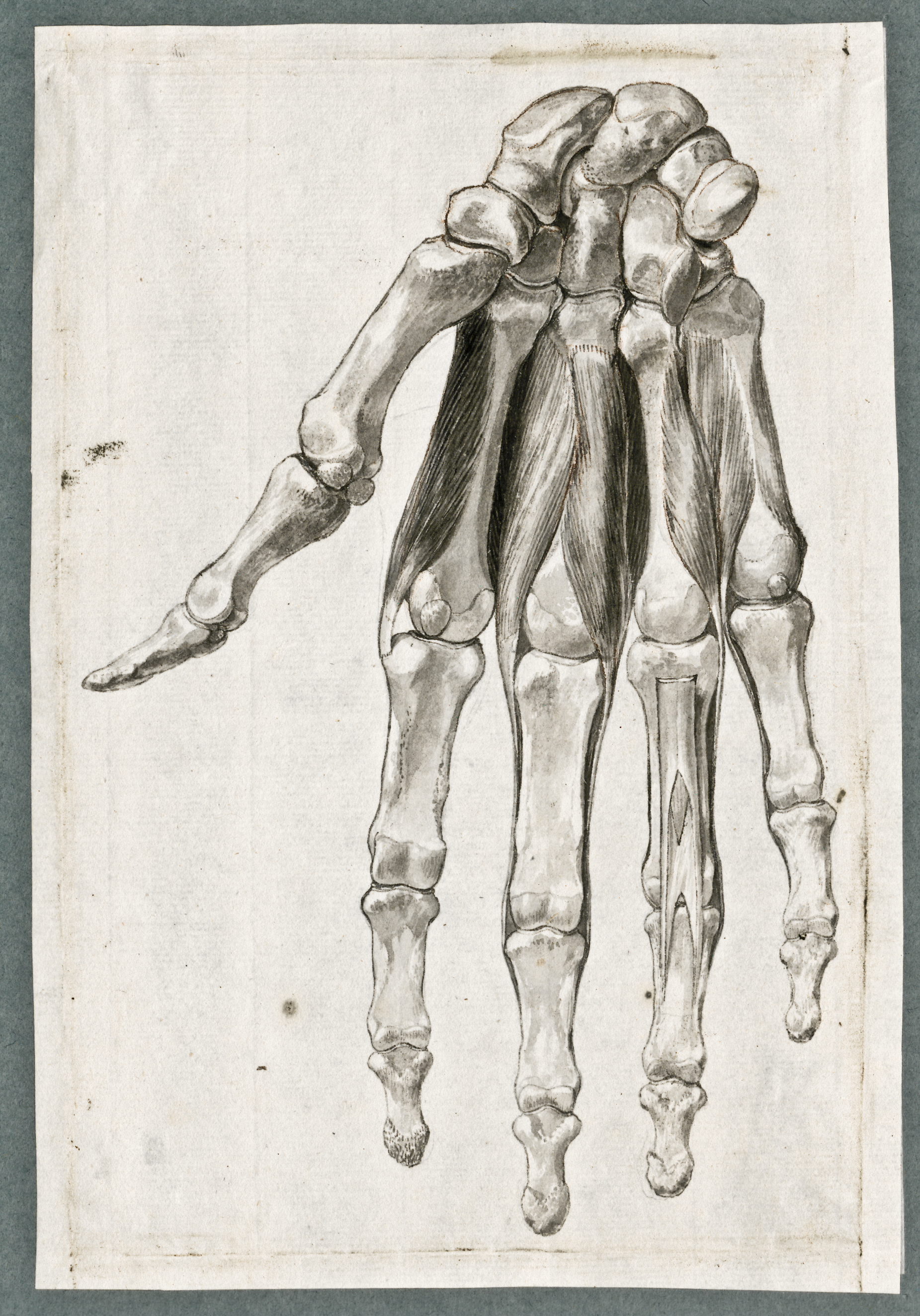
Jan Wandelaar and Bernhard Siegfried Albinus: Human hand muscles. Sketch for B.S. Albinus, Tabulae sceleti et musculorum corporis humani, Leiden 1747. Leiden University Library.

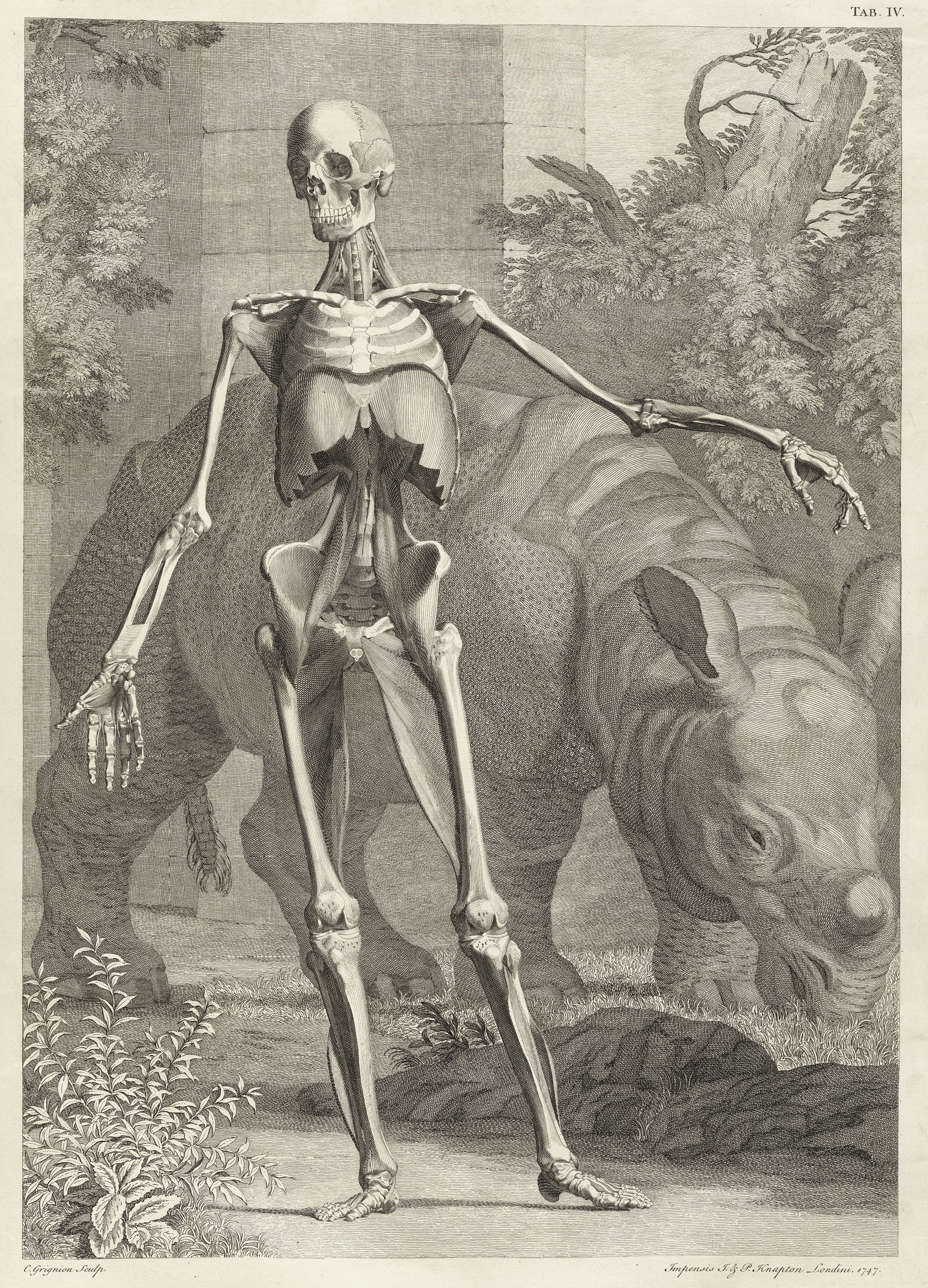
Wandelaar's iconic illustration From Albinus' Tabulae sceleti et musculorum corporis humani (London, 1749) which included the then popular rhinoceros Clara.

== Publications ==
- Oratio inauguralis de anatomia comparata. (Leiden, 1719, 4.)
- Oratio inaug. qua in veram viam, quae ad fabricae corporis humanae cognitionem ducit, inquiritur. (Leiden, 1721, 4.)
- Index supellectilis anatomicae, quam Academiae Batavae, quae Leidae est, legavit Iohannes Iacobus Ravius, rogatu Illustrissimorum et Amplissimorum academiae istius curatorum et urbis consulum confectus a Bernhard Siegfried Albino, qui et vitam ejus nec non merhodum curandi calculofos infimulque instrumentorum figuras addit. (Leiden, 1721, 4. c. fig.)
- De ossibus corporis humani ad auditores fuos libellus. (Leiden, 1726, 8; which in Vienna, 1748 and 1757, in 8 was reprinted.)
- Historia musculorum hominis. (Leiden, 1734, 1736, 4. c. fig. C. Möhsen portr. p. 128. (Note: Pierre Tarin published a French reprint in 1753, under the title Myographie ou description des muscles.)
- Dissertatio de arteriis et venis intestinorum hominis, adjecta icon coloribus distincta. (Leiden 1736, 1738, 4.)
- Dissertatio secunda de sede et caussa coloris Aethiopum et caeterorum hominum; accedunt icones coloribus distinktae. (Leiden, 1737, 4.)
- Icones officum foetus humani; accedit osteogeniae bevis historia. (Leiden, 1737, 4.)
- Tabulae sceleti et musculorum corporis humani. (Leiden, 1747, 4.), greek Print London, 1749, Translated into English, London, 1752, greek print C. Moehsen Portr. p. 126
- Uteri mulieris gravidae, cum jam parturiret, mortuae tabulae VII. (Leiden 1748), Print regional appendix, 1751, Pr. reg.
- Tabulae ossium humanorum. (Leiden 1753), greek Print (Note: There are also careless English reprints.)
- Tabulae vatis chyliferi cum vena azygos, arteriis intercostalibus aliisque vicinis partibus. (Leiden 1757), Pr. reg.
- Academicarum annotationum liber I.—VIII., (Leiden, 1754 — 1768, greek. 4.)
- De sceleto humanum liber. (Leiden 1767, 4.), Andreae Vesalii opera omnia anatomica et chirurgica cura Herrmanni Boerhaave et Bernhardi Siegfried Albini. Tomus Primus (I.) et Secundus (II.) (Leiden, 1775), Print ca. figurative.
- Hieronymi Fabricii ab Aquapendente opera omnia anatomica et physiologica hactenus, variis locis ac formis edita, nunc uno certo ordine digesta, et in unum volumen redacta. Accessit rerum et verhorum index complettissimus una cum praesatione B. S. Albini. (Leiden 1737, Print.)
- Gulielmi Harvei opera, seu exercitatio anatomica de motu cordis et sanguinis in animalibus, atque exercitationes duae anatomicae de circulatione sanguinis ad Ioannes Riolanum filius et exercitationes de generatione animalum cum praefatione B. S. Albini. (Leiden 1736, 1737, 4; 2 Volumes. Leiden, 1757, 4., compare Balthasar. Eustachii Explicationes tabularum anatomicarum. Accedit nova tabularum editio, per B. S. Albinum. (Leiden, 1744, Print, Increased and improved, Leiden 1761, print.)

== Sources ==
- Choulant, L. History and bibliography of anatomic illustration. Trans. and annotated by Mortimer Frank. (New York: Hafner, 1962).
- Ferguson, J. P. "The skeleton and the rhinoceros." Proceedings of the Royal College of Physicians of Edinburgh. 1989 Apr; 19(2): 231-2.
- Adelung, Johann Christoph (1784). Fortsetzung und Ergänzungen zu Christian Gottlieb Jochers allgemeinem Gelehrten-Lexico, worin die Schriftsteller aller Stände nach ihren vornehmsten Lebensumständen und Schriften beschrieben werden [Continuation and additions to Christian Gottlieb Jocher's general scholar lexicon, in which the writers of all classes are described according to their noblest circumstances and writings] (in German) (1st ed.). Leipzig: Johann Friedrich Gleditsch.
- Huisman, Tim (1992). "Squares and diopters: the drawing system of a famous anatomical atlas". Tractrix: Yearbook for the History of Science, Medicine, Technology and Mathematics (4): 1–11. ISSN 0924-0829. PMID 11623095.
- Moehsen, Johann Carl Wilhelm (1771). Verzeichnis einer Samlung von Bildnissen, gröstentheils berühmter Aerzte; so wohl in Kupferstichen, schwarzer Kunst und Holzschnitten, als auch in einigen Handzeichnungen: diesem sind verschiedene Nachrichten und Anmerkungen vorgesetzt, die sowohl zur Geschichte der Arzeneygelahrtheit, als vornehmlich zur Geschichte der Künste gehören; von J. C. W. Moehsen, des Königlichen Preußischen Obercollegii Medici, und Obercollegii Sanitatis, wie auch der Römisch-Kayserlichen Akademie der Naturforscher Mitglied, der Königlichichen neuen Ritter-Akademie, des adelichen Kadettenkorps, und des Joachimsthalischen Gymnasti, ordentlich bestellten Medicus. Mit Vignetten [Directory of a collection of portraits, mostly famous doctors; in copper engravings, black art and woodcuts, as well as in some hand drawings: various messages and comments are placed in front of it, which belong both to the history of pharmacology and primarily to the history of the arts; by J.C. W. Moehsen, the Royal Prussian Obercollegii Medici, and Obercollegii Sanitatis, as well as a member of the Roman-Imperial Academy of Natural Sciences, the Royal New Knight Academy, the noble Cadet Corps, and the Joachimsthaler Gymnasium, duly appointed Medicus. With vignettes.] (in German) (1st ed.). Berlin: Christian Friederich Himburg.
- Moran, Michael E. (30 October 2013). "Ruysch's Use of Kidney Stones: Exhibits". Urolithiasis: A Comprehensive History. Springer Science & Business Media. ISBN 978-1-4614-8196-6.
- Nordenskióld Erik "Bernhard Siegfried Albinus (1697–1770)", History of Biology, pp. 258–259 Illustration.
