= Albanian =

Albanian may refer to:

- Pertaining to Albania in Southeast Europe; in particular:
  - Albanians, an ethnic group native to the Balkans
  - Albanian language
  - Albanian alphabet
  - Albanian culture
  - Demographics of Albania, includes other ethnic groups within the country
- Pertaining to other places:
  - Albania (disambiguation)
  - Albany (disambiguation)
  - St Albans (disambiguation)
- Albanian cattle
- Albanian horse
- The Albanian, a 2010 German-Albanian film

== See also ==
- Olbanian language
- Albani people
- Albaniana (disambiguation)
- Alba (disambiguation)
