= Saint-Alban =

Saint-Alban is a French place-name that may refer to:

== France ==
=== Ain ===
- Saint-Alban, Ain, France

=== Ardèche ===
- Saint-Alban-Auriolles, Ardèche
- Saint-Alban-d'Ay, Ardèche
- Saint-Alban-en-Montagne, Ardèche
- Saint-Alban-sous-Sampzon, former commune of Ardèche

=== Côtes-d'Armor ===
- Saint-Alban, Côtes-d'Armor, France

=== Haute-Garonne ===
- Saint-Alban, Haute-Garonne, France

=== Isère ===
- Saint-Alban-de-Roche, Isère
- Saint-Alban-du-Rhône, Isère

=== Loire ===
- Saint-Alban-les-Eaux, Loire

=== Lozère ===
- Saint-Alban-sur-Limagnole, Lozère

=== Savoie ===
- Saint-Alban-de-Montbel, Savoie
- Saint-Alban-des-Hurtières, Savoie
- Saint-Alban-des-Villards, Savoie
- Saint-Alban-Leysse, Savoie

== Canada ==
- Saint-Alban, Quebec, Canada

== See also ==
- Alban (disambiguation)
- St. Albans (disambiguation)
