= Albano Contarini =

Venetian nobleman

Albano Contarini was a Venetian nobleman and governor of Athens from 1395 to 1397. He was born to a Venetian father of the Contarini family and an Albanian mother from Avlona (Vlorë). He tried to buy Vlorë from Komnina, the wife of Balsha II. By July 18, 1399 Albano Contarini had been appointed podestà and captain of Nauplia and was to take over what was left of the government of Argos.
