= USS Albany =

USS Albany has been the name of more than one United States Navy ship, and may refer to:

- USS Albany (1846), a 22-gun sloop-of-war commissioned in 1846 and lost at sea in 1854.
- USS Albany (1869), a 14-gun screw sloop-of-war commissioned as USS Contoocook in 1868, renamed Albany in 1869, and decommissioned in 1870
- USS Albany (CL-23), a protected cruiser, later reclassified as a light cruiser, in commission from 1900 to 1904, from 1907 to 1913, in 1914, and from 1916 to 1922
- USS Albany (CA-72), a heavy cruiser renamed USS Pittsburgh (CA-72) in 1942 prior to the beginning of construction
- USS Albany (CA-123), a heavy cruiser in commission from 1946 to 1958, converted to a guided missile cruiser and redesignated USS Albany (CG-10), and then in commission again from 1962 to 1967 and from 1968 to 1980
- USS Albany (SSN-753), a Los Angeles-class attack submarine commissioned in 1990 and still in active service
