= Albany (late 20th-century automobile) =

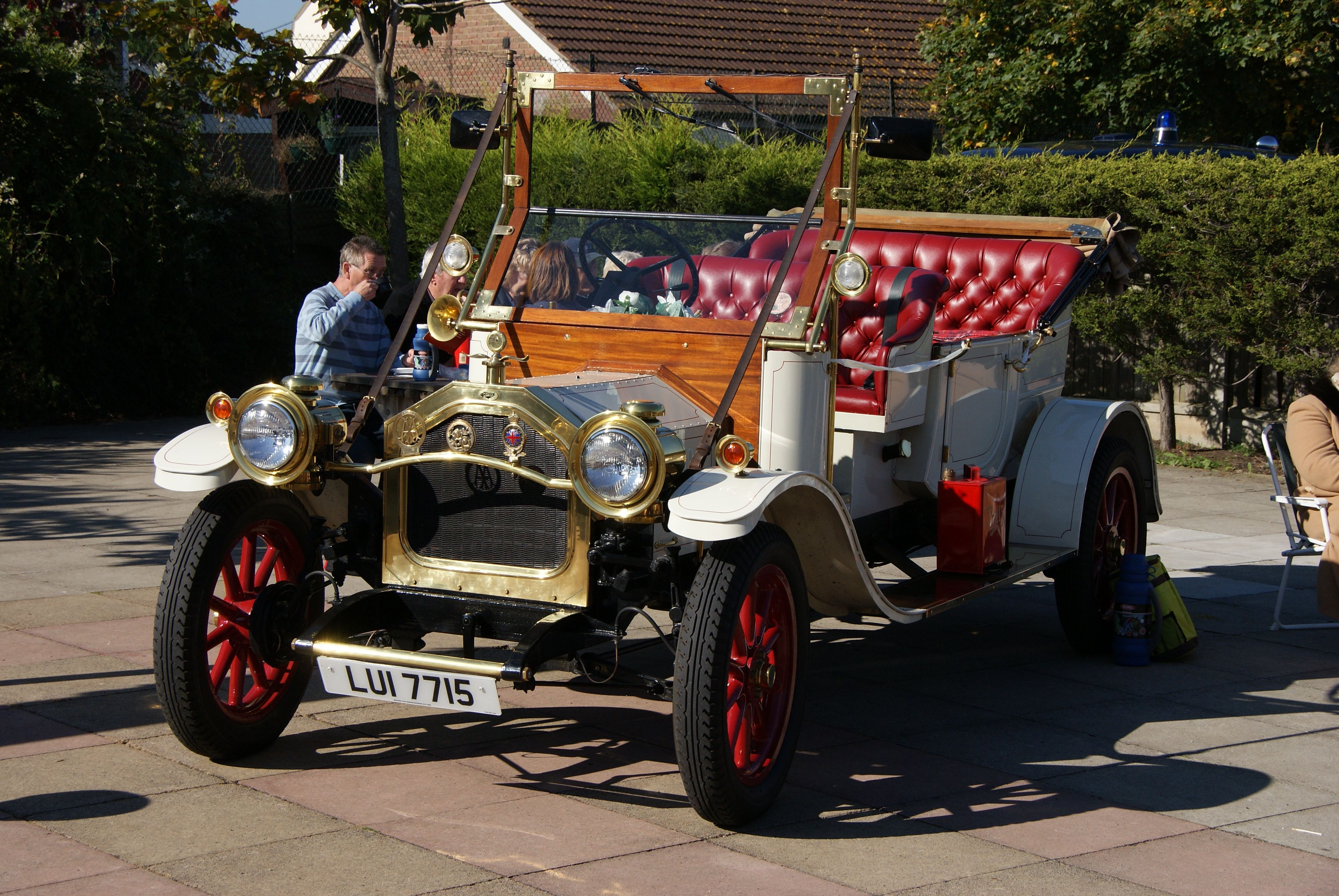

The Albany was an English automobile, manufactured by the Albany Motor Carriage Company in Christchurch, Dorset from 1971 - 1997.

== History ==
The company was run by two brothers, Bryan and David Shepherd.

The car was designed as a veteran car, in the Edwardian style, but is not a replica of any particular marque although it bears some resemblance to a 1908 Buick. Early models used the BMC A-series engine and suspension from the Morris Minor in a specially built tubular steel chassis. The engine was governed to allow a maximum speed of 40 mph (64.4 km/h). The car was hand built and quite expensive at £1987 before a long list of extras was added. Purchasers requiring a hood or a screen found themselves invited to pay an extra £70 or £50 for these luxuries.

From 1974 a 1300 cc Standard SC engine from the Triumph Spitfire was used and a longer wheelbase five-seat option came in 1976.

Albany also made a replica 1910 AEC open air bus, based on a Ford D Series lorry chassis, that now provides very brief quasi-vintage bus rides at the Beaulieu motor museum in Hampshire. It appeared in the 1970s remake of the film 'The 39 Steps' starring Robert Powell.

In 1973 about a car every two weeks was being produced and exports to the United States started. However, after about 12 cars were shipped the importing company failed. The price in 1974, now with a 1500cc Triumph engine had risen to £2487. By 1977 110 cars had been built.

As of 1992, the open-top Albany featuring a 1500 cc SC engine was being built for export only.

The company closed in 1997.

== See also ==
- List of car manufacturers of the United Kingdom
