= Mathias Albani =

Italian violin maker

Mathias Albani or Matthias Alban (29 December 1634 – 7 February 1712) was a violin maker from Botzen (now Bolzano in South Tyrol).

== Biography ==
He was born in Kaltern and became one of Jacob Stainer's best pupils. The tone of his violins, which are generally very high in the belly and have a dark red, almost brown, varnish, is more remarkable for power than for quality.

His son, also named Mathias, was at first a pupil of his father, afterwards of the Amatis at Cremona, and finally settled at Rome. His best violins, which by some connoisseurs are considered hardly inferior to those of the Amatis, are dated at the end of the 17th and beginning of the 18th century.

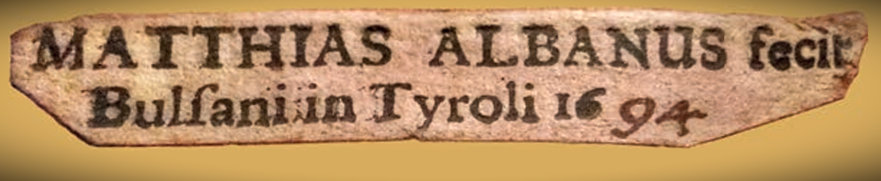
Alban's label as of 1694

A third Albani, whose given name is not known, lived during the 17th century at Palermo. He also made good violins, which resemble those of the old German makers.
