= Greek Shorthorn =

Breed of cattle

The Greek Shorthorn is a rare breed of cattle under extensive husbandry condition in mountain areas of the northwest regions of Greece.

Their height is typically between 0.97 and 1.14 meters. They have small heads with short and thin horns. The body weight of the males is roughly 300 kilograms (661 pounds). The average body weight of the females is around 200 kg (441 pounds).

They are usually grey-blond to dark brown in color.
