= Bernhardus Albinus =

German physician

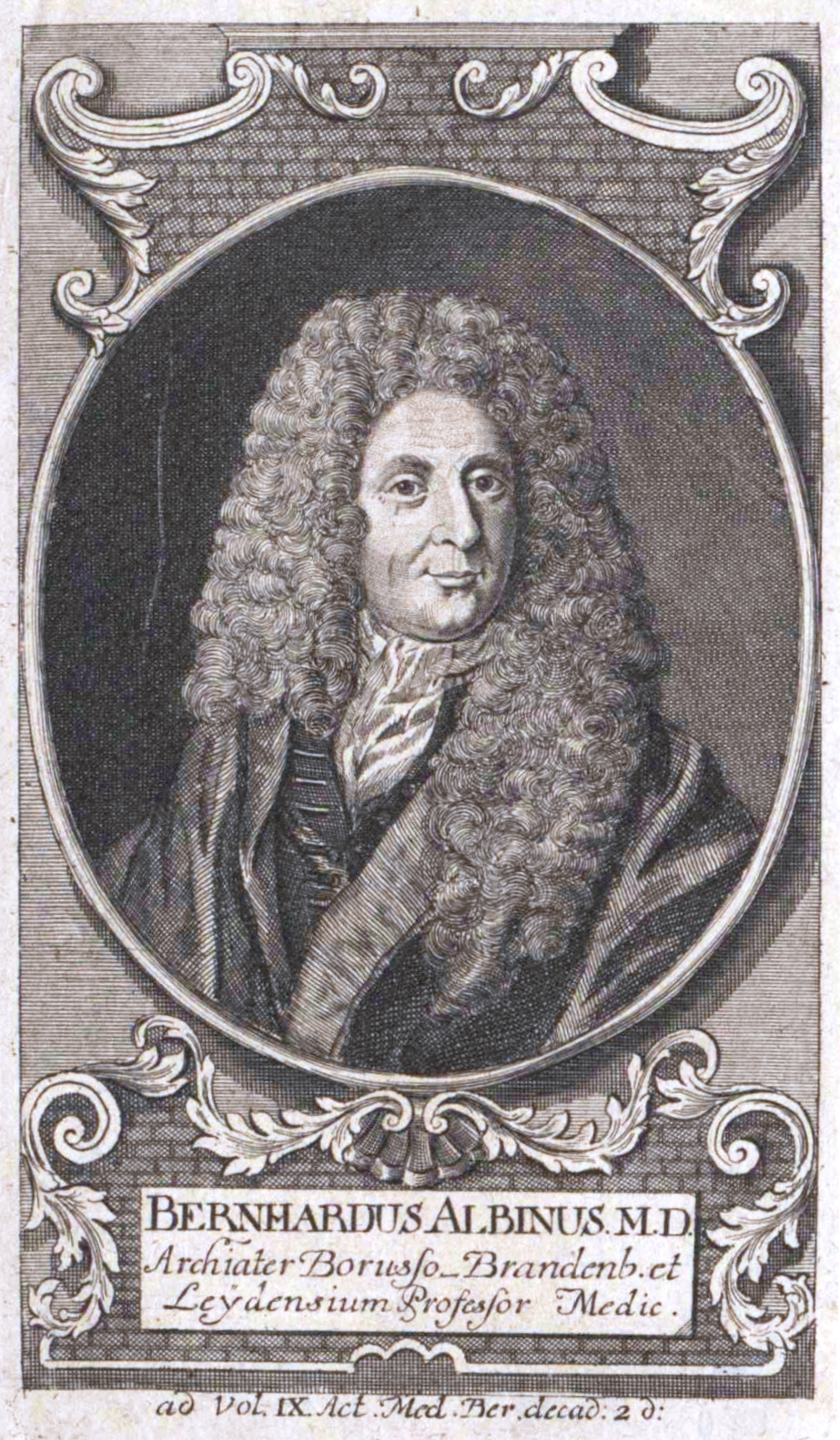
Bernhardus Friedrich Albinus (1653-1721)

Bernhardus Friedrich Albinus (7 January 1653, Dessau – 7 September 1721, Leiden) was a Dutch physician and anatomist. His sons Bernhard Siegfried Albinus (1697–1770) and Friedrich Bernhard Albinus (1715-1778) were also anatomists of note in Leiden.

Albinus was born in Dessau in the principality of Anhalt, where his father, Christoforus Albinus, was the mayor. His ancestral family name, Weiss, had been changed to Albinus in the 16th century, after the fashion of the time, by his ancestor Petrus Weiss, poet and historian. In his youth, a poor physical constitution led to his being schooled at home before being sent to the public school of his city. When the scientist Hendrik Alers, head of the school, was called to the famous school of Bremen in 1669, Albinus joined him. He studied the sciences and languages, especially physics and philosophy, with interest. From Bremen he went to the University of Leiden, where he studies medicine under Carolus Drelincourt, Lucas Schacht and Theodorus Cranen. In 1676 he returned to Dessau, and subsequently traveled through the Netherlands, Brabant and France, where he learned medicine, anatomy and surgery. He returned to Dessau in the summer of 1680, passing through Lorraine, following the Rhine, and through Holland. That same year he was promoted to professor in medicine at the University of Frankfurt on the Oder, where he started working on 13 January 1681, even though he only became a Doctor on 16 April of the following year. Frederick William I, Elector of Brandenburg appointed him as his personal physician and geheimrat, which he stayed both until the death of the King on 26 April 1688, after which he returned to Frankfurt as a professor.

Six years later, the government of the University of Groningen offered him the function of Provincial Doctor and professor of medicine, with a salary of 1200 Dutch guilder. Even though he was pleased with the offer, he was prevented from accepted it because of the promises and gifts from Frederick I of Prussia, son and successor of Frederick William I, who increased his yearly income with 600 guilder and in 1697 not only appointed him as his personal physician but also offered him a canonry in Magdeburg, an honorary title which he sold with the approval of the king, because he couldn't fulfill it in person.

After Albinus had been the personal physician of Frederick I for five years, the governors of the University of Leiden offered him in 1702 the function of professor of theoretical and practical medicine with positive and honourable conditions, which he accepted with the consent of the king. After the king had given him a valuable golden medal with his effigy, he left with his family to Holland, followed by a large number of German students. With a speech on the origin and progress of medicine, he accepted the position on 19 October of said year, which he filled studiously and faithfully, to the glory of the university, until his death on 7 September 1721.

In 1696 he married Susanna Catharina Rings, daughter of Thomas Siegfried Rings, professor of law in Frankfurt, with whom he had eleven children, four sons and seven daughters. Of those, one son, Bernhard Siegfried Albinus, became a professor in Leiden, while another, Christiaan Bernard Albinus, became a professor of anatomy in Utrecht, all with great fame. His epitaph was written by Herman Boerhaave and published as H. Boerhaavii Oratio Academica de vita et obitu B. Albini.

Among his writings are:

- De corpusculis sanguine contentis
- De Tarantulae mira vi
- De sacro Freisenwaldensium fonte
