= Albany (1907 automobile) =

Defunct American motor vehicle manufacturer

Albany Automobile Company
- Industry: Automotive
- Founded: 1907
- Defunct: 1908
- Headquarters: Albany
- Key people: John L. Tulley
- Products: Automobiles

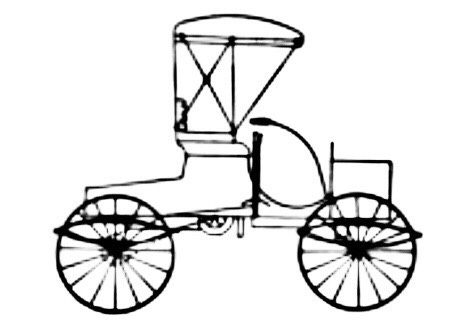
Albany Model 2 Model 3 Model B Runabout (1907)

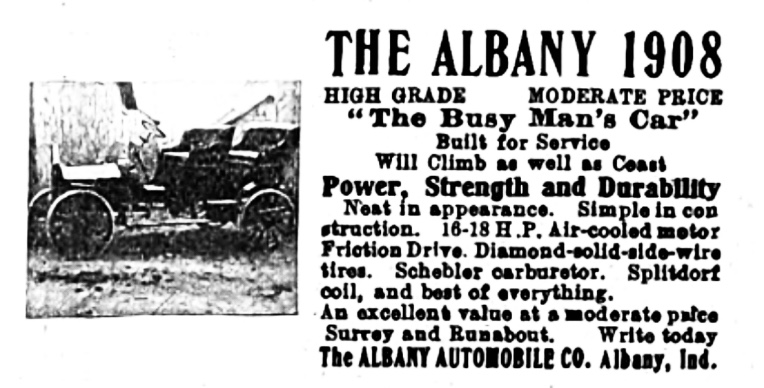
Albany Model G Surrey (1908)

The Albany was an American car produced in Albany, Indiana, from 1907 to 1908.

It was produced as a surrey and a runabout, and was an early vehicle with false hood and solid rubber tires. The single- and 2-cylinder air-cooled motors produced 6/7 hp and 18/20 hp respectively. In 1907, the first model B was introduced. The model B had a single-cylinder engine with 1042 cc, a bore of 114.3 mm, and a stroke of 101.6 mm. The engine produced 7 hp. The body was designed as a runabout. The selling price was a reasonable 325 dollars. The Model B developed from its predecessors, Model 2 and Model 3. Model 2 reached 16 km/h (10 mi/h) with the 4/6 HP engine, while Model 3 achieved 32 km/h (20 mi/h) with the 8/10 HP two-cylinder engine. All of them were highwheelers with a steering handle instead of a steering wheel. The engine was always located under the seat. The vehicles were constantly being improved. Engine power was further increased. A two-cylinder engine was also tested, which became standard from Model F and Model G onwards. The steel tires were replaced with solid rubber tires. Fenders were added and a false hood was designed to mimic a front engine.

The car was manufactured by a local inventor and businessman, John L. Tulley (1872–1954), who held several turn of the 20th century patents, including a gauge to measure oil. Tulley was a mechanic whose early days were spent as a surveyor's assistant. He went on to assist in building power and light plants around the midwest before arriving in Albany to form the Albany Automobile Company in about 1906. The Albany Runabout had two opposing cylinders and was air-cooled. Up to 850 cars were said to have been built and they were shipped to all parts of the country, with at least one vehicle shipped to England.

Marketed as "the busy man's car", one of the Albany's main selling points was blue dyed elephant hide seats, which were supposedly guaranteed to last the lifetime of the car.

In August 1908, production ended when the company went bankrupt. The Union Automobile Company took over the company in September 1908.
