= Albany Park =

Albany Park is the name of various geographic locations:

- Albany Park, Bexley, an area and park in the London Borough of Bexley
  - Albany Park railway station, in Bexley
- Albany Park, Enfield, a park in the London Borough of Enfield
- Albany Park, Chicago, a community area of Chicago
