= Albano buoy system =

Course marking for rowing and canoeing events

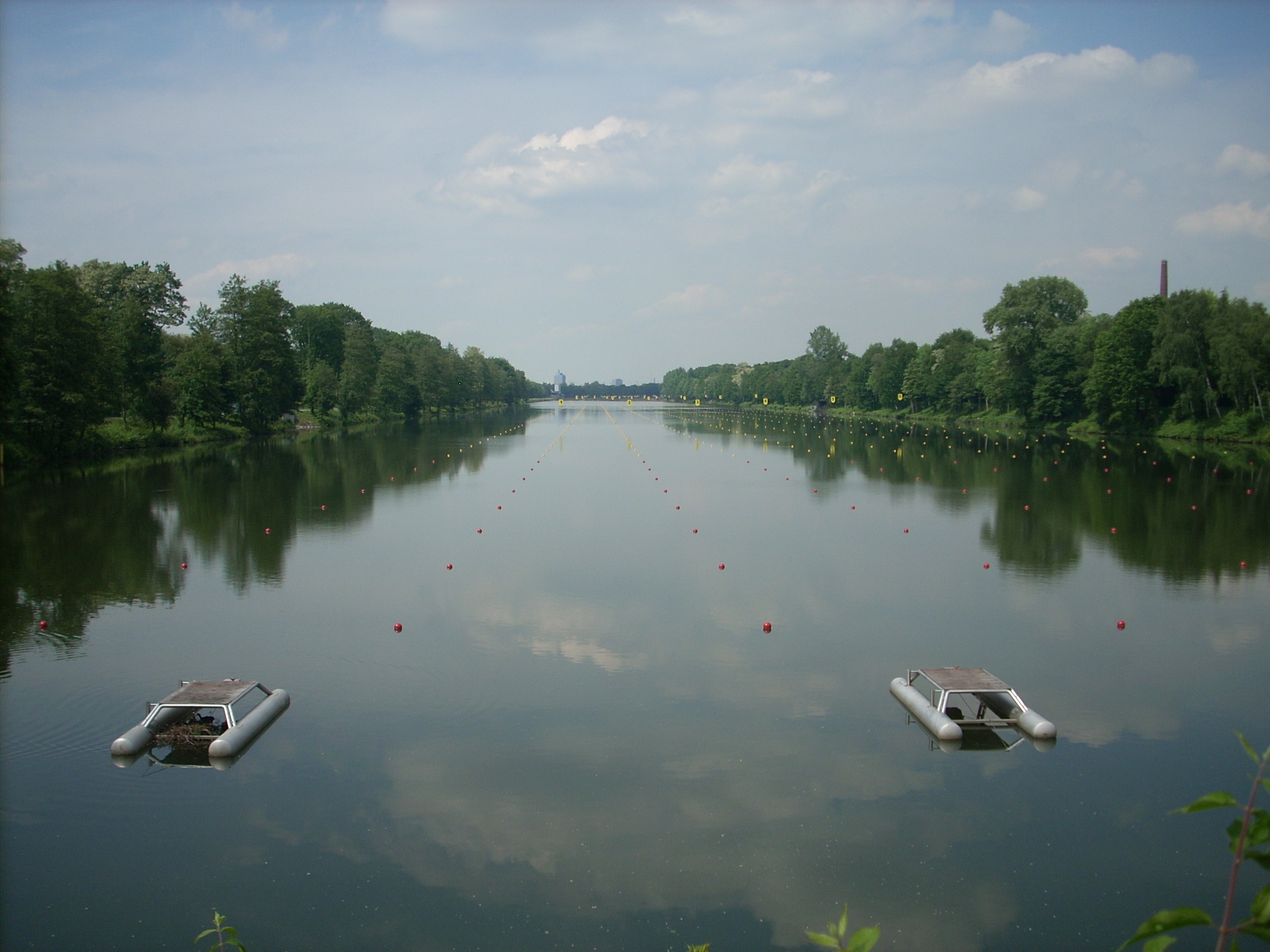
The Albano lane system in use at Duisburg regatta course.

The Albano lane system is a method of marking kayak, canoe and rowing racecourses using lines of buoys. It was first used internationally in the 1960 Summer Olympics held on Lake Albano, Italy. It has since become an international standard for most FISA events and is used in Olympic rowing events.

== Technical description ==
The marked course is typically straight, and 2000 meters in length. The buoy system usually consists of six adjacent 13.5 meter-wide lanes, outlined by 7 lines of small, spherical buoys placed 10 or 15 meters apart. The buoys are red for the first and last 100 meters, the rest being white. The six lanes are used for racing, and there may also be a separate lane for boats moving from the end of the course to the start line (the up channel). Some courses have as many as eight racing lanes. Distances along the course are often marked at intervals, usually every 250 metres, with prominent numbered signs on the shoreline.

The lane buoys remain in place in most water and weather conditions due to longitudinal wires that are suspended from the buoys at a depth of about 1.5 metres. Depending on local conditions, cross-links between the longitudinal wires are attached every 500 metres along the course. The system is anchored at intervals and tensioned with weights both in the water and on the shore. This allows the entire system to ride up and down with varying water levels. In some locations, the entire Albano system can be removed from the racecourse in as little as four hours.
