= Giuseppe Albani (footballer) =

Italian footballer (1921–1989)

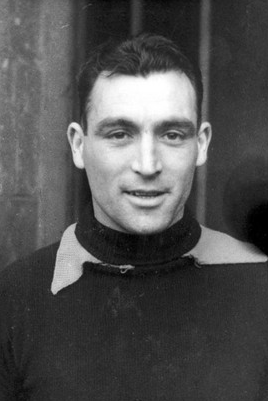

Personal information
- Date of birth: 8 April 1921
- Place of birth: Cava Manara, Italy
- Date of death: 7 June 1989 (aged 68)
- Position: Goalkeeper

Senior career*
Years	Team	Apps	(Gls)
1938–1941	Pavese		
1941–1942	Ambrosiana-Inter	0	(0)
1942–1943	Broni		
1943–1945	Pavia		
1945–1946	Broni	18	(0)
1946–1949	Internazionale	14	(0)
1949–1954	Atalanta	123	(0)
1954–1956	Brescia	26	(0)
1956–1957	did not play		
1957–1958	Brescia	10	(0)
- * Club domestic league appearances and goals

Giuseppe Albani (8 April 1921 – 7 June 1989), popularly known as Peppino, was a professional Italian football player. He was born in Cava Manara in April 1921 and died in June 1989 at the age of 68.
