= Yurino cattle =

Breed of cattle

Yurino
- Conservation status: FAO (2007): critical; DAD-IS (2020): unknown
- Country of origin: Russian Federation; Mari Republic

Traits
- Weight: Male: average 650–700 kg, to 900 kg; Female: average 415–500 kg, to 700 kg
- Coat: shades of red, sometimes with white markings
- Cattle; Bos (primigenius) taurus

The Yurino (Russian: Юpинcкaя, Yurinskaya) is a dual purpose cattle breed from the Russian Federation, particularly the Mari Republic.
