= Bower Park Academy =

Secondary School with Academy Status in Romford, London, England

Coordinates: 51.60532°N 0.18107°E

Location
- Havering Road; Romford, London, RM1 4YY; England

Information
- Type: Academy
- Established: 1949; 77 years ago
- Department for Education URN: 139307 Tables
- Ofsted: Reports
- Head Teacher: E Aylett
- Gender: Coeducational
- Age: 11 to 16
- Enrolment: 820
- Houses: Moore, Rowling, King, Edison
- Colours: Yellow, red, blue, green
- Website: http://www.bowerpark.co.uk

Bower Park Academy is a secondary school with academy status, located in the Romford area of the London Borough of Havering, London, England.

== History ==
The school opened in 1949 as Chase Cross Secondary Modern. It was reorganised as a comprehensive school in 1971. In 1989 it was amalgamated with Forest Lodge School and it was renamed to its current name, Bower Park.

Bower Park was formed of two sites, with the second site being located in Lodge Lane. This site was eventually demolished and now holds a housing estate.

In 2007, the school got new sports facilities which included a new sports hall as well as an astro turf pitch. This was opened by boxing legend Frank Bruno (MBE).

In a 2009 Ofsted report the school was given the mark "Satisfactory".

In the 2014 Ofsted report the academy was given the mark "Requires Improvement".

The school gained its specialist Arts College (media) status in 2010.

Bower Park School was converted to an academy on 1 February 2013, but continues to have media arts as a specialism.

In 2016, the academy received a mark of "Inadequate" on the Ofsted report.

In 2018, the academy received a mark of "good" on the Ofsted report.

== Departments ==
Departments include Creative Media, English, Humanities, ICT, Languages, Maths, Performing Arts, Physical Education, Science, Technology, Senco, TheHub and Vocational Studies.

== International projects ==
In 2011, students from the Bower Park School basketball team shadowed students from Ridge Community High School in a cultural exchange programme as part of their tour to Florida in the United States.

== Notable former pupils ==
- John Cornwell, former Newcastle and Southend United footballer (Forest Lodge School)
- Mark Hunter, Olympic gold medallist
- Jo O'Meara, singer
- Rhys Stephenson, BBC television presenter
