= Albaniana =

Albaniana may refer to:

- Albaniana language, an Indo-European language spoken by approximately 7.6 million people, primarily in Albania and Kosovo
- Choristoneura albaniana, a moth species in the genus Choristoneura
- A synonym for Euoplos, a spider genus found in Australia
- Albaniana, a Roman fort in modern-day Alphen aan den Rijn, The Netherlands
