= Mark Alban =

English cricketer and medical doctor

Personal information
- Full name: Mark Timothy Alban
- Born: 19 April 1966 (age 60); Kendal, Westmorland, England
- Batting: Right-handed
- Bowling: Leg break

Domestic team information
- Years: Team
- 1989: Cambridge University

Career statistics
Competition	First-class
Matches	3
Runs scored	134
Batting average	33.50
100s/50s	–/1
Top score	86
Balls bowled	12
Wickets	–
Bowling average	–
5 wickets in innings	–
10 wickets in match	–
Best bowling	–
Catches/stumpings	–/–
- Source: Cricinfo, 13 October 2013

Mark Timothy Alban (born 19 April 1966) is an English medical doctor and former first-class cricketer.

Born at Kendal, Westmorland, Alban studied at Sedbergh School and Jesus College, Cambridge, playing first-class cricket during his studies for the university cricket club. Alban made his first-class debut for the university against Nottinghamshire at Fenner's in 1989, with him playing two further first-class matches in that season against Sussex at Hove and Oxford University at Lord's. He scored a total of 134 runs at an average of 33.50, with a high score of 86, which came against Oxford University.

Alban is now a general practitioner in Bristol.
