= Albán =

San José de Albán
- Municipality and town
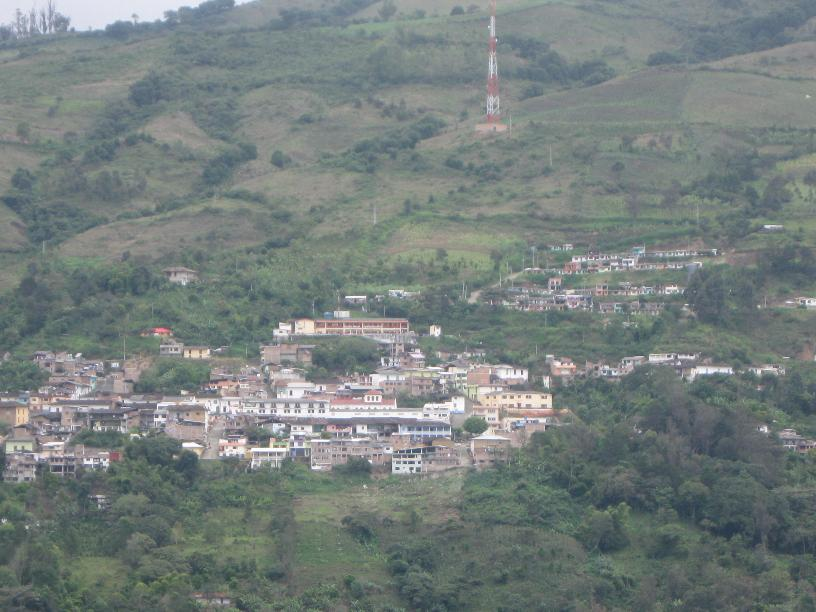
- View of Albán

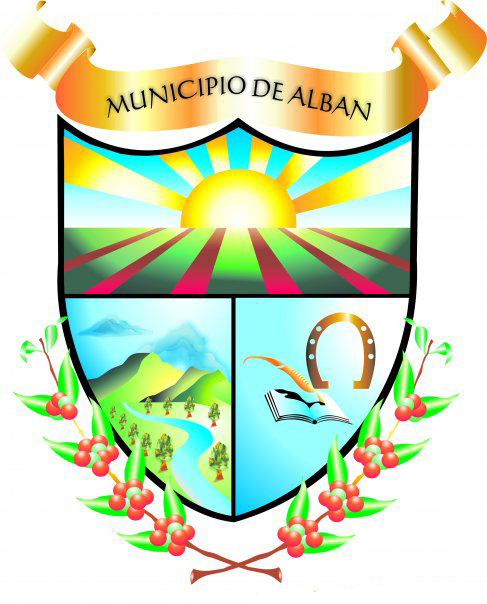
- Flag Coat of arms

- Location of the municipality and town of Albán in the Nariño Department of Colombia.
- Coordinates: 1°28′28″N 77°5′1″W
- Country: Colombia
- Department: Nariño Department

Area
  - Total: 43.47 km^{2} (16.78 sq mi)

Population (Census 2018)
  - Total: 8,197
  - Density: 188.6/km^{2} (488.4/sq mi)
- Time zone: UTC-5 (Colombia Standard Time)

San José de Albán is a town and municipality in the Nariño Department, Colombia. The town was established on 15 June 1573. As of 2018 it had a population of 8,197.

== Veredas ==
The municipality contains the following veredas:

- 1. El Diviso
- 2. Betania
- 3. San Antonio de Guarangal
- 4. La Primavera
- 5. El Socorro
- 6. San Bosco
- 7. Tambo Alto
- 8. Tambo Bajo
- 9. Viña
- 10. El Cebadero

- 11. San Luis
- 12. Alto de Las Estrellas
- 13. Buena Vista Las Palmas
- 14. Casco Urbano
- 15. El Carmelo
- 16. Campobello
- 17. Fátima
- 18. El Salado
- 19. Chapiurco
