= Regent Albany =

Regent Albany can refer to several Dukes of Albany who served as regent of the Kingdom of Scotland:

- Robert Stewart, Duke of Albany (c.1340 – 1420)
- Murdoch Stewart, Duke of Albany (1362–1425)
- John Stewart, 2nd Duke of Albany (1481–1536)
