= Luigi Albani =

Italian footballer (1928–1993)

Personal information
- Date of birth: 24 May 1928
- Place of birth: Rome, Italy
- Date of death: January 1993 (aged 64)
- Position: Goalkeeper

Senior career*
| Years | Team | Apps | (Gls) |
| 1947–1948 | Ostiense | | |
| 1948–1955 | Roma | 78 | (0) |
| 1955–1956 | Foligno | | |
- * Club domestic league appearances and goals

Luigi Albani (24 May 1928 – January 1993) was an Italian footballer who played for 5 seasons (50 games) in Serie A for Roma. During his Roma career he was mostly the backup goalkeeper, except for two seasons when he was first-choice: 1951–52, when Roma were in Serie B, and 1952–53. Albani died in January 1993, at the age of 64.
