= MV Empire Albany =

Empire ship of the United Kingdom

History
- Name: Empire Albany (1944-46); Albany (1946)
- Owner: Ministry of War Transport (1944-46); Mrs P Dowds (1946)
- Operator: J Fisher & Sons Ltd (1944-46); Mrs P Dowds (1946)
- Port of registry: Lowestoft (1944-46); Ireland (1946)
- Builder: Richards Ironworks Ltd, Lowestoft
- Yard number: 337
- Launched: 3 October 1944
- Completed: December 1944
- Identification: UK Official Number 166695 (1944-46); Code letters MPDM (1944-46)
- Fate: Sank 20 November 1946

General characteristics
- Tonnage: 306 GRT
- Length: 132 ft 5 in (40.36 m)
- Beam: 24 ft 6 in (7.47 m)
- Depth: 7 ft 9 in (2.36 m)
- Propulsion: 2 x SCSA diesel engines (Crossley, Manchester) 110 hp (82 kW)

Empire Albany was a 306-ton Coaster which was built in 1944. She was renamed Albany in 1946 and disappeared on a voyage between Port Talbot and Rosslare in 1946.

== History ==
Empire Albany was built by Richards Ironworks Ltd, Lowestoft as yard number 337. She was launched on 3 October 1944 and completed in December 1944. Empire Airman was owned by the Ministry of War Transport and operated under the management of the J Fisher & Sons Ltd.

In 1946, Empire Albany was sold to Mrs P Dowds, Ireland and renamed Albany. On 20 November 1946, Albany departed Port Talbot bound for Rosslare, but did not arrive. Albany was carrying a cargo of coal. Two ship's boats and the name board from Albany were washed up near St David's Head on 22 November.

== Official number and code letters ==
Official numbers were a forerunner to IMO Numbers.

Empire Airman had the Official Number 166695 on Lloyd's Register and used the Code Letters MPBM
