= St Albans station =

St Albans station may refer to:

- St Albans City railway station, in St Albans, Hertfordshire, England
- St Albans Abbey railway station, in St Albans, Hertfordshire, England
- St Albans railway station (Hatfield and St Albans Railway), a former station in St Albans, Hertfordshire, England
- St Albans railway station, Melbourne, Victoria, Australia
- St. Albans station (LIRR), Queens, New York City, USA
- St. Albans station (Vermont), St. Albans, Vermont, USA

== See also ==
- St. Alban station, Germany
