= Frederik Bernard Albinus =

Friedrich Bernhard Albinus or Frederik Bernard Albinus (20 June 1715 – 23 May 1778) was a Dutch anatomist. He was the fourth and youngest son of Bernhardus Albinus, and succeeded his brother Bernhard Siegfried Albinus (1697–1770) at the University of Leiden as professor of anatomy.

Albinus was born in Leiden where he was educated. Matriculating in literature in 1731, he went to Leiden University and studied mathematics and philosophy under Willem 's Gravesande; botany under Adriaan van Royen; and medicine under Herman Boerhaave, his brother Bernhard and Hieronymus David Gaubius. Receiving a doctorate in 1740 he became a physician in Amsterdam. In 1745 he became a lecturer in anatomy at the University of Leiden and in 1770 he replaced his brother as professor of human physiology after 1770. His most important work was De natura hominis libellus (1775) which included works by his deceased brother.

Other publications included:

- De meteoris ignitis (Leiden, 1740)
- Dissertatio medica inauguralis de deglutitione (Leiden, 1740)
- De amoenitatibus anatomicis (Leiden, 1745)
- De causis dissensionum inter anatomices (Leiden, 1748)
- De praestantia chirurgiae (Leiden, 1755)
- De amictus noxis (Leiden, 1767)
- De ambulatione, eaque utili, et necessaria, et jucunda (Leiden, 1771)
