= Hornchurch High School =

Location
- Broadstone Road; Hornchurch, London Borough of Havering, RM12 4AJ; England
- Coordinates: 51.5595°N 0.2003°E

Information
- Type: Academy
- Department for Education URN: 137189 Tables
- Ofsted: Reports
- Head Teacher: Serena Madhvani
- Gender: Mixed
- Age: 11 to 16
- Colours: yellow, blue, green, and purple
- Website: www.hornchurchhighschool.com

Hornchurch High School is a mixed secondary school with academy status, located in the Hornchurch area of the London Borough of Havering, England. Until September 2018, it was known as 'The Albany School'.

The school converted to academy status on 1 August 2011. Previously it was a foundation school and Business and Enterprise College administered by Havering London Borough Council. The school continues to coordinate with Havering London Borough Council for admissions.

In January 2019 an Ofsted inspection report rated the school as 'Good'. This was despite the school achieving the best GCSE results in its history in 2012. The school has implemented a School Improvement Plan to address the findings of the report.

In June 2018, The Albany School became the first school in the UK to have a silent corridor policy.

In September 2018, the school was renamed to Hornchurch High School. Construction for a new two-storey building for the art and design, and technology departments, started in 2018. Of which is now used on a daily basis for the English department.
