= St. Albans School =

St. Albans School may refer to:

== Australia ==
- St Albans Secondary College, a 7-12 secondary school located at St Albans, Victoria, Australia

== South Africa ==
- St. Alban's College, a private boarding and day school for boys in Lynnwood Glen, Pretoria, Gauteng, South Africa

== United Kingdom ==
- St Alban's Catholic High School, Ipswich, a secondary school and sixth form with academy status located in Ipswich, Suffolk
- St Alban's Roman Catholic High School, Pontypool, a Roman Catholic secondary school in Pontypool, Torfaen, Wales

=== St Albans, Hertfordshire ===
- St Albans Girls' School, a girls secondary school
- St Albans High School for Girls, a selective, independent day school for girls aged 4–18 years
- St Albans School, Hertfordshire, an independent school founded in 948

== United States ==
- Saint Albans High School (West Virginia), a public high school in Kanawha County, West Virginia
- St. Albans School (Washington, D.C.), day and boarding school for boys, Washington, D.C.
- ʻIolani School, formerly known as St. Albans School, in Honolulu, Hawaii
