= Silvia Albano (judge) =

Italian judge

Silvia Albano is an Italian judge who is also the president of the left-wing judicial faction Magistratura democratica. She ran, unsuccessfully, to be head of the Associazione Nazionale Magistrati in 2020. She is notable for making many pro-migrant decisions resulting in fights with the national government.

== 2024 pro-migrant decision ==
In 2023, Albano drew attention by preemptively declaring support for illegal migrants against the democratically elected Giorgia Meloni government's efforts to move processing offshore to enforce Italian laws. She previously, in 2019, battled then-interior minister Matteo Salvini who described her as having "pro-migrant sympathies". She had also, in 2021, ruled against the government's policy of pushing illegal migrants back to Slovenia prior to being admitted in Italy.

She gained notoriety in 2024 for her decision against the Italian government's offshore detention of illegal migrants in Albania which was heavily criticized. In response, she declared she is not a "communist judge". She also filed a police complaint and was given additional protection following death threats. Conservative politicians declared that she should have abstained from the decision given her history of left-wing activism and donations. She has come under attack from Meloni and Matteo Salvini who described her as a political judge for the left-wing Partito Democratico and called for her resignation.

== Personal life ==
Albano is from Padua in Veneto but has long lived in Lazio.
