= Albania, Santander =

Coordinates: 5.76139°N 73.9178°W

- Municipality and town
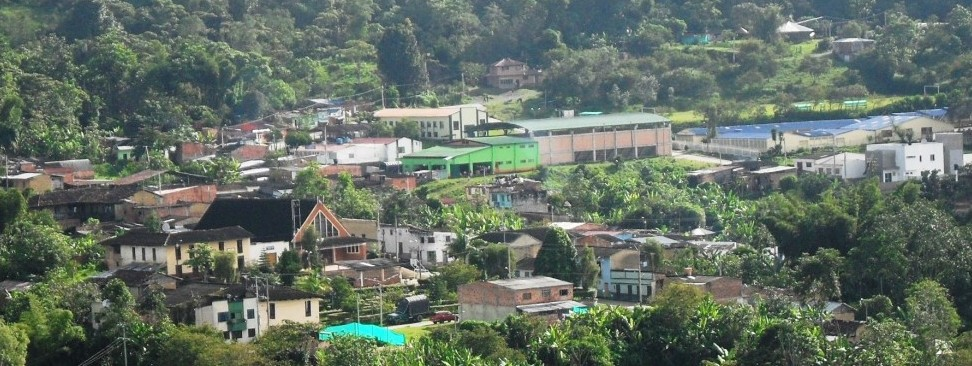

- Flag Coat of arms

- Location of the municipality and town of Albania, Santander in the Santander Department of Colombia.
- Country: Colombia
- Department: Santander Department
- Established: 19 August 1919

Area
  - Total: 1,650 km^{2} (640 sq mi)
- Time zone: UTC-5 (CST)
- Climate: Af

Albania is a town and municipality in the Santander Department in northeastern Colombia.

== Climate ==
Climate data for Albania, elevation 1,690 m (5,540 ft), (1981–2010)
Month	Jan	Feb	Mar	Apr	May	Jun	Jul	Aug	Sep	Oct	Nov	Dec	Year
Mean daily maximum °C (°F)	22.9 (73.2)	23.0 (73.4)	22.9 (73.2)	22.8 (73.0)	23.0 (73.4)	23.0 (73.4)	23.1 (73.6)	23.4 (74.1)	23.3 (73.9)	22.8 (73.0)	22.8 (73.0)	22.8 (73.0)	23.0 (73.4)
Daily mean °C (°F)	18.5 (65.3)	18.5 (65.3)	18.7 (65.7)	18.8 (65.8)	18.8 (65.8)	18.8 (65.8)	18.7 (65.7)	18.9 (66.0)	18.7 (65.7)	18.5 (65.3)	18.6 (65.5)	18.4 (65.1)	18.7 (65.7)
Mean daily minimum °C (°F)	14.3 (57.7)	14.6 (58.3)	14.9 (58.8)	15.3 (59.5)	15.3 (59.5)	14.8 (58.6)	14.5 (58.1)	14.6 (58.3)	14.6 (58.3)	14.8 (58.6)	14.9 (58.8)	14.7 (58.5)	14.8 (58.6)
Average precipitation mm (inches)	158.4 (6.24)	158.2 (6.23)	226.7 (8.93)	334.7 (13.18)	288.3 (11.35)	143.3 (5.64)	105.7 (4.16)	125.8 (4.95)	188.3 (7.41)	351.3 (13.83)	301.2 (11.86)	203.5 (8.01)	2,503.5 (98.56)
Average precipitation days	14	15	19	22	21	15	13	14	18	22	21	18	206
Average relative humidity (%)	87	87	87	85	87	87	85	83	85	87	88	88	86
Mean monthly sunshine hours	142.6	112.9	99.2	81.0	99.2	99.0	133.3	136.4	126.0	108.5	111.0	130.2	1,379.3
Mean daily sunshine hours	4.6	4.0	3.2	2.7	3.2	3.3	4.3	4.4	4.2	3.5	3.7	4.2	3.8
Source: Instituto de Hidrologia Meteorologia y Estudios Ambientales
