= Albania (disambiguation) =

Albania is a country on the Balkan Peninsula in south-eastern Europe.

Albania may also refer to:

== Places ==
- Albania (placename)

=== Territories related to present-day Albania ===
- Kingdom of Albania (medieval), Albanian-Angevin kingdom established in 1272
- Venetian Albania, Venetian possessions in southern the coastal area of what is now northern Albania and the coast of Montenegro
- Sanjak of Albania, a subdivision of the Rumelia Eyalet of Ottoman Empire in period 1385–1466
- Albanian Vilayet, a vilayet of the Ottoman Empire projected in 1912 in the western Balkan Peninsula
- Independent Albania, former unrecognized country established in 1912 comprising the territories of Kosovo Vilayet, Monastir Vilayet, Shkodër Vilayet and Janina Vilayet
- Republic of Central Albania, a short-lived unrecognized state established on October 16, 1913, with its administrative centre in Durrës, today in Albania
- Principality of Albania, 1913–25, locally called a kingdom
- Albanian Republic, a 1925–28 republic in Albania which was a de facto protectorate of the Kingdom of Italy
- Albanian Kingdom (1928–39), the constitutional monarchical rule in Albania between 1928 and 1939 which was a de facto protectorate of the Kingdom of Italy
- Albanian Kingdom (1939–43), a protectorate of the Kingdom of Italy
- Albanian Kingdom (1943–44), a puppet state of Nazi Germany
- People's Socialist Republic of Albania, the official name of Albania from 1946 until 1992
- Greater Albania, an irredentist concept of Albanian homeland

=== Territories not related to present-day Albania ===
- Caucasian Albania or Arran, a historical territory in the southern Caucasus with borders roughly corresponding to those of modern Azerbaijan
- Albania (satrapy), the same area within the Iranian Sassanid Empire
- Alba, Latinised as Albania, an old Gaelic name for Scotland or Great Britain

=== Populated places ===
- Albania, La Guajira, Colombia
- Albania, Santander, Colombia
- Albania, Caquetá, Colombia
- Arbanum or Albania, an Albanian town and former bishopric

== Other uses ==
- Albania (periodical), an Albanian publication by Faik Konica 1896–1910
- Albania (album), a 1973 album by Marinella
- "Albania", a Series A episode of the television series QI

== See also ==
- Alba (disambiguation)
- Albanian (disambiguation)
- Albany (disambiguation)
- Alban Hills, ancient Latin Albanus Mons, a region near Rome, Italy
- Albani people, an ancient tribe living in Italy
- Names of the Albanians and Albania
