= Severus of Trier =

4th-century bishop of Trier

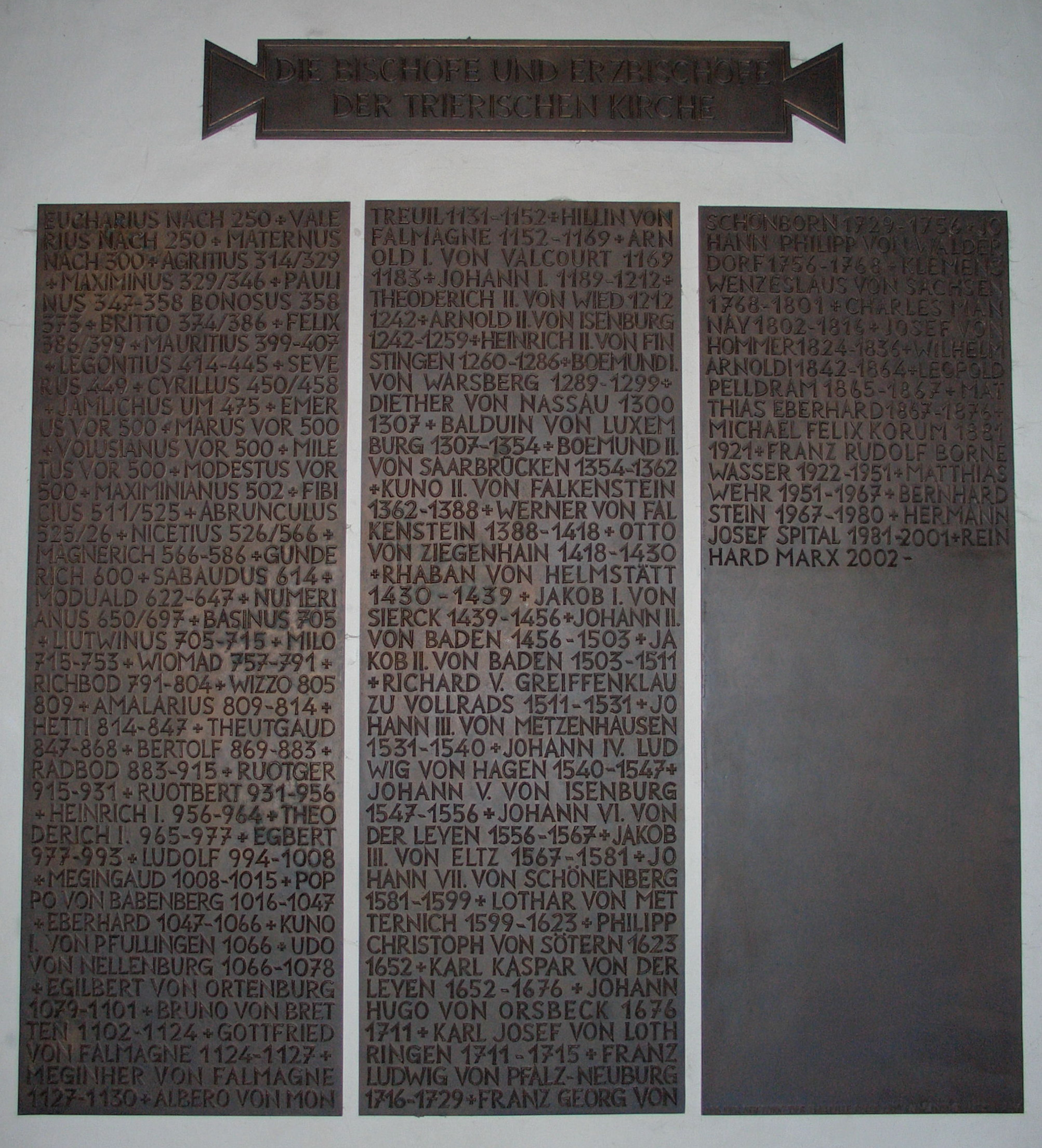

Severus von Trier was Bishop of Trier from about 445/446. He proselytized to and contributed to the conversion of Germanic peoples living in the regions of the lower Moselle and Middle Rhine.

== Life ==
Von Trier was in close contact with Germanus of Auxerre and Lupus of Troyes (* to 383; † about 478) and was believed to be a students of Lupus in the 430s.

His term as bishop succeeded the term of Leontius of Trier. One of his most notable accomplishments was accompanying Germanus on his second trip to Britain to combat Pelagianism. This trip is thought to have been about the year 446/447.

He also proselytized among the prima Germania, Germanic tribes such as the Rhine Franks and Alemanni. These earlier attempts to extend the ecclesiastical influence on the region of the lower Moselle and the Middle Rhine were successful.

A later tradition reports that he had received the first papal privilege for the Trier Church.

== Historicity ==
Severus is written about in the late antiquity Vita of Germanus of Auxerre, and mentioned around 480 by Constantius of Lyon. Furthermore, he also appears in the Life of Lupus of Troyes and the Ecclesiastical History of the Venerable Bede. These combined works brought together the previously separate reports on the journey to Britain and the German Mission. In his research, Wilhelm Levison has been skeptical about the identification of the Severus with these missions. However other researchers, such as Eugen Ewig, disagree. Here they found value in the Vita of Lupus. But the question remains whether the Vita is contemporary. For many writers, the doubts have now been dispelled. Hans Hubert Anton has examined the sources again critically and concludes that the Vita of Lupus must be nearly contemporary. The travel to Britain he considers plausible.

== Veneration ==
In the diocese of Trier, he is revered on 15 October. The Bollandists revere him on March 16.

Titles of the Great Christian Church
Preceded by Auctor II	Archbishop of Trier; 428 – 455	Succeeded by Cyrillus of Trier
