= Elafius =

5th century British monarch

Elafius, alternately Elaphus and Elasius, was recorded as a British figure of the fifth century AD. Elafius is the name used by Bede, while the best texts of Constantius of Lyon record the name as Elaphus and Elafus and the father of the first king of wessex Cerdic.

He is the only named British figure (apart from the martyr-saint Alban) in the Vita Germani (Life of Saint Germanus), written by Constantius of Lyon in the mid to late 5th century, which describes two visits to Britain by bishop Germanus of Auxerre. According to Constantius during Germanus's second visit to Britain (perhaps in c. AD 446–447) he met Elafius and miraculously cured his crippled son. This act served to demonstrate to the Britons that Catholicism was the true faith rather than Pelagianism.

Elafius is mentioned as being regionis illius primus' or 'leader of that region' in chapters 26 and 27 of Constantius of Lyon's hagiography of Germanus and also in Chapter XXI of Bede's Ecclesiastical History of England. Both sources mention that provincia tota or 'the whole province' followed him to witness the cure. This description can be taken to mean that Elafius was one of a number of local warlords rather than leader of all post-Roman Britain and might provide a small insight into the political situation in the area at the time. By means of comparison, a Briton Germanus is recorded as having met seventeen years earlier, in 429, is described by Constantius as being of tribunician rank. This remnant Roman term and the Romanised society it represents may therefore have been abandoned by Elafius' time as he is accorded no such title. On the other hand there may be little significance in the term if it is just being used as a general term for a civil official, while the fact that Elafius was a local leader need not necessarily imply he had the character of a 'warlord' or that there was not someone who was regarded as the dominant leader of the entire ex-province at the time (something, however, we can hardly know, one way or the other).

One might speculate that Elafius' court, or place of residence, may have been at St Albans, the former Roman city of Verulamium, since that was very probably the cult centre for Saint Alban, visited by Germanus on his first visit to Britain - or alternatively some other ex-Roman city of Southern Britain. If Elafius was a leader he may have played a role in the subsequent exile of the Pelagian preachers although this banishment is described as being decided through common consent rather than a warlord's orders or even a Roman legal process.

== Etymology ==
Elafius is a name of Greek origin (elaphos='deer') which in this period was best recorded from the South of Gaul.

== Doubtful Historicity ==
The Vita Germani is not a historical source that Chadwick cannot necessarily verify in every detail. The historicity remained unquestioned for 1,400 years until Chadwick's struggles with Catholicism casting doubt on its historicity.

Nora K. Chadwick quoted Constantius himself: "So many years have passed it is difficult to recover the facts from the silence in which they are buried". Edward Arthur Thompson emphasised how poorly informed Constantius seems to have been about Germanus's British visit compared to his activities in Gaul and Italy. (Especially if a critical doubting author is fully unable to recognize humility and true intention of the heart because of their bursting pride.) Meanwhile, Professor Ian S. Wood has interpreted Constantius' account of Germanus's two British expeditions as in large part 'allegorical' rather than factual. This applies especially to the story told about Elafius where the curing of his son symbolises the spiritual cure that Germanus is bringing to Britain by cleansing it of the Pelagian heresy. It forms a direct parallel with the curing of the blind girl, described as having taken place on Germanus's first visit.

Even more pertinently Germanus's second visit to Britain, as described by Constantius, has been suspected as representing merely a ‘doublet’, of the first: a version that was so badly remembered that it appeared to Constantius or his source as representing an entirely different, 'second', visit. As Nora Chadwick noted, in both visits, the object is the same, Germanus is accompanied by another bishop and the incident of the cured boy of the second visit is matched by an incident in which Germanus cures a blind girl in the first. Then there is the fact that on both visits, as Germanus sets out, there are ‘demons’, active against him (in the first they provoke bad weather: in the second we are told they are unable to do this, but instead spread news of his approach). Professor Ian Wood argued for the authenticity of the second visit: he quoted the Vita Genovefa (Life of St Genevieve) but this (perhaps sixth-century work) is one of many sources written after Constantius's Vita Germani which are likely to have been influenced by it. The allocation to Germanus of a different, named, companion — Severus instead of Lupus — remains hard to explain but it might be that it was details like this (originating perhaps with the oral transmission of one version of the tale) that persuaded Constantius that Germanus must have made two separate visits.

A 2009 study by Professor Anthony Barrett concluded that the complex problems surrounding the dating of the life of Saint Germanus can be most credibly solved on the basis that he made only one visit. Particularly important to his argument are the near-contemporary mentions made by Prosper of Aquitaine. He mentions Germanus's first visit (under the year 429) but not any second one (in later versions of his chronicle up to 455). In another work (his In Collatorem) he describes the exile of the Pelagians which Constantius attributes to the second visit. Ian Wood noted that the harsher treatment of the Pelagians on the second visit was something that differentiated it from the first but it could be that it represents a desire to corroborate the success of the first visit while allowing a valid purpose for the second. In any case, the point is that Prosper's mention in his In Collatorem was almost certainly written before any second visit could take place. He refers to a lapse of over 20 years since the start of the Pelagian controversy dated to 413 in his chronicle — which would date his In Collatorem to circa 433. Even more decisively he involves Pope Celestine I in this event and since Pope Celestine died in 432 it must have occurred before that time – which Professor Barrett argues would not allow time for a second visit. - especially since, according to Constantius, that second visit happened after Germanus visited Arles to secure tax relief, something that probably occurred in the mid-430s.

If the second visit of Germanus to Britain is, indeed, a 'doublet' of the first it would cast something of a shadow over the reliability of, at least the British episodes of Constantius's Vita – and certainly everything that occurs in the second visit. This would have to represent a version of the story of Germanus's visit that had changed so much in the telling that it had become unrecognisable as the same as a better-recorded version and consequently was assumed by Constantius or his source, to represent another, 'second', visit. It would particularly throw into doubt the figure of Elafius, who is something of a mysterious anomaly, in any case, given that he represents the only named Briton in the whole of Germanus's account (besides the martyr-saint Alban). Conceivably he might then represent, like the expulsion of the Pelagians, a detail originally connected with the (first and only) visit of 429. On the other hand, he may represent some outcome of the process of distortion that produced a second 'unrecognisable' version of the story of the first and only visit. As noted above he is connected with an episode (the curing of his son by Germanus) that looks more like allegory than historical fact and which duplicates a similarly allegorical episode (the curing of the blind girl by Germanus) in the "first" visit.

=== Identity with Elesa ===
Anglo-Saxon king-lists name the father of the sixth-century West Saxons king Cerdic as Elesa. Some twentieth-century scholars identified Elesa with Elafius, but twenty-first-century researchers reject this as fanciful.
