= Saint Alban =

British protomartyr

Saint Alban of Britain
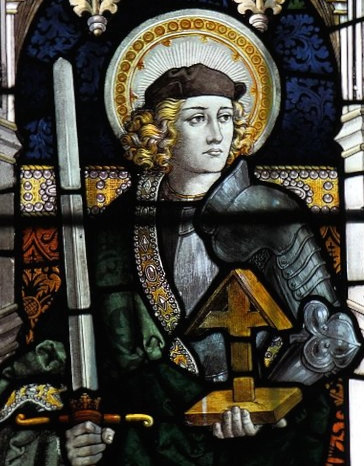

Protomartyr of Britain
- Born: unknown Verulamium, Roman Britain (modern-day St Albans, United Kingdom)
- Died: disputed: 209, c. 251 or 304; Holywell Hill (formerly Holmhurst Hill), St Albans
- Venerated in: Catholic Church; Anglican Communion; Eastern Orthodox Church; Oriental Orthodox Church; Church of the East
- Major shrine: Cathedral and Abbey Church of St Alban
- Feast: 22 June (Anglican Communion, Eastern Orthodox Church, General Roman Calendar of 1960); 20 June (Current Roman Calendar)
- Attributes: soldier with a very large cross and a sword; decapitated, with his head in a holly bush and the eyes of his executioner dropping out
- Patronage: converts, refugees, torture victims

Saint Alban (/ˈɔːlbən, ˈæl-/; Latin: Albanus) is venerated as the first-recorded British Christian martyr, for which reason he is considered to be the protomartyr of Britain. Along with fellow Saints Julius and Aaron, Alban is one of three named martyrs recorded at an early date from Roman Britain (Amphibalus was the name given much later to the priest he was said to have been protecting). He is traditionally believed to have been beheaded in Verulamium (modern-day St Albans) sometime during the 3rd or 4th century, and has been celebrated there since ancient times.

== Life and hagiography ==
Sparse records testify that Alban was a Roman citizen living in Verulamium around AD 300. Nothing is known of his background or age. The story of his trial and execution were told in several sources. The earliest reference to Alban's martyrdom is in the Life of Germanus by Constantius of Lyons (written between 460 and 480). According to this account Germanus visited Alban's tomb in 429. However, Verulanium was not mentioned by Constantius. A later British writer, Gildas, wrote around 547 and referred to 'Alban of Verulanium' and gave a recognisable account of the execution. which he places in Londinium as he refers to crossing the Thames before the execution.

=== Bede's account ===
One of the best known accounts is that of Bede's Ecclesiastical History of the English People, written in 731.

In the 3rd or 4th century (see dating controversy below), Christians began to suffer cruel persecution. However, Gildas says he crossed the Thames before his martyrdom, so some authors place his residence and martyrdom in or near Londinium. Both agree that Alban met a priest fleeing from persecutors and sheltered him in his house for a number of days. The priest, who later came to be called Amphibalus (Latin for "cloak"), prayed and "kept watch" day and night, and Alban was so impressed by the priest's faith and piety that he found himself emulating him and soon converting to Christianity. Eventually, it came to the ears of an unnamed "impious prince" that Alban was sheltering the priest. The prince gave orders for Roman soldiers to make a strict search of Alban's house. As they came to seize the priest, Alban put on the priest's cloak and clothing and presented himself to the soldiers in place of his guest.

Alban was brought before a judge, who just then happened to be standing at the altar, offering sacrifices to devils (Bede's reference to pagan 'gods'). When the judge heard that Alban had offered himself up in place of the priest, he became enraged that Alban would shelter a person who "despised and blasphemed the gods," and, as Alban had given himself up in the Christian's place, Alban was sentenced to endure all the punishments that were to be inflicted upon the priest, unless he would comply with the rites of their pagan religion. Alban refused, and declared, "I worship and adore the true and living God who created all things." (The words are still used in prayer at St Alban's Abbey). The enraged judge ordered Alban to be scourged, thinking that a whipping would shake the constancy of his heart, but Alban bore these torments patiently and joyfully. When the judge realized that the tortures would not shake his faith, he gave orders for Alban to be beheaded.

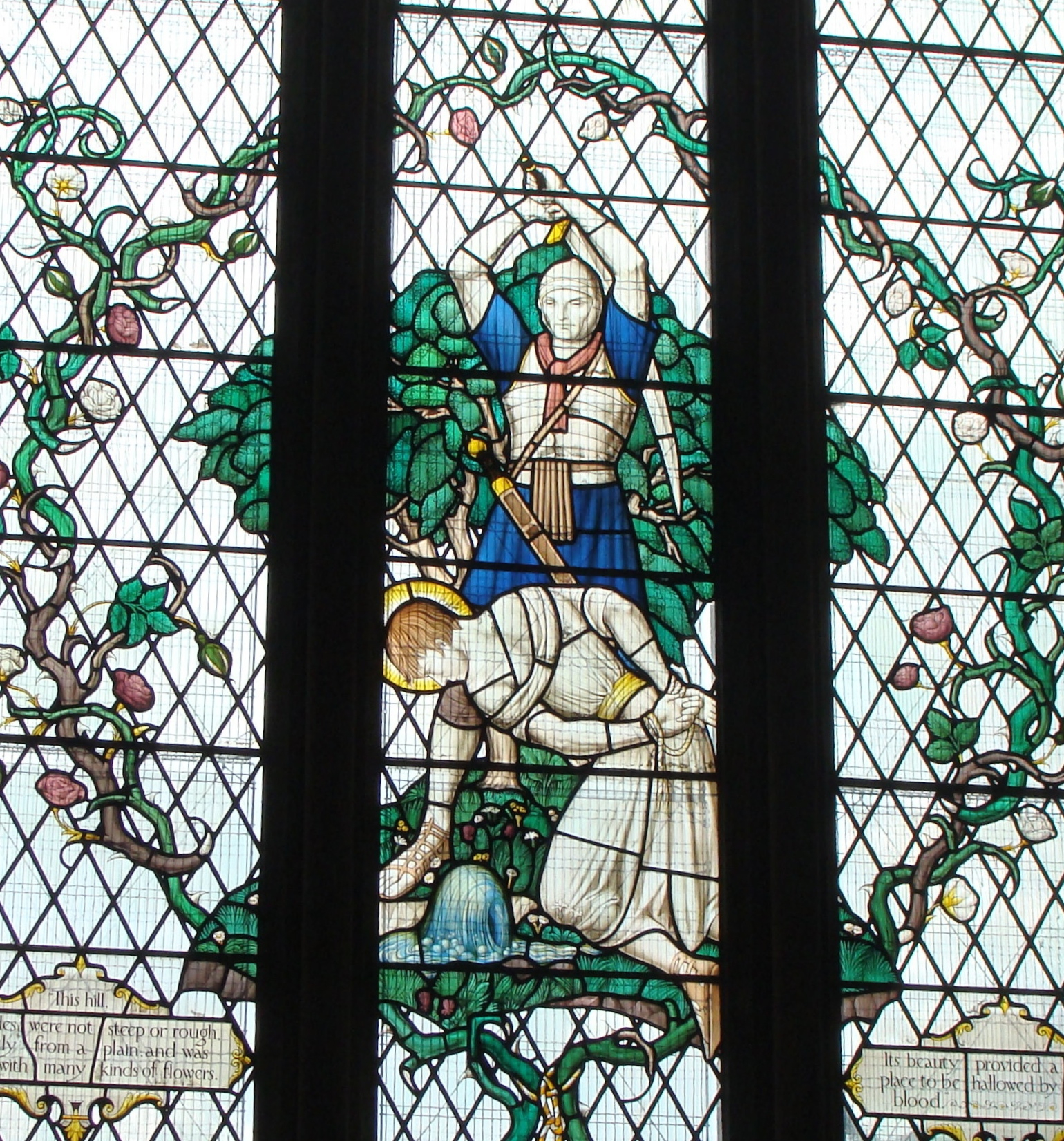
Stained glass in St Albans Cathedral in England, showing the martyrdom of Saint Alban

Alban was led to execution, and he presently came to a fast-flowing river that could not be crossed (believed to be the River Ver). There was a bridge, but a mob of curious townspeople who wished to watch the execution had so clogged the bridge that the execution party could not cross. Filled with an ardent desire to arrive quickly at martyrdom, Alban raised his eyes to heaven, and the river dried up, allowing Alban and his captors to cross over on dry land. The astonished executioner cast down his sword and fell at Alban's feet, moved by divine inspiration and praying that he might either suffer with Alban or be executed for him.

The other executioners hesitated to pick up his sword, and meanwhile, Alban and they went about 500 paces to a gently sloping hill, completely covered with all kinds of wildflowers, and overlooking a beautiful plain. (Bede observes that it was a fittingly beautiful place to be enriched and sanctified by a martyr's blood.)

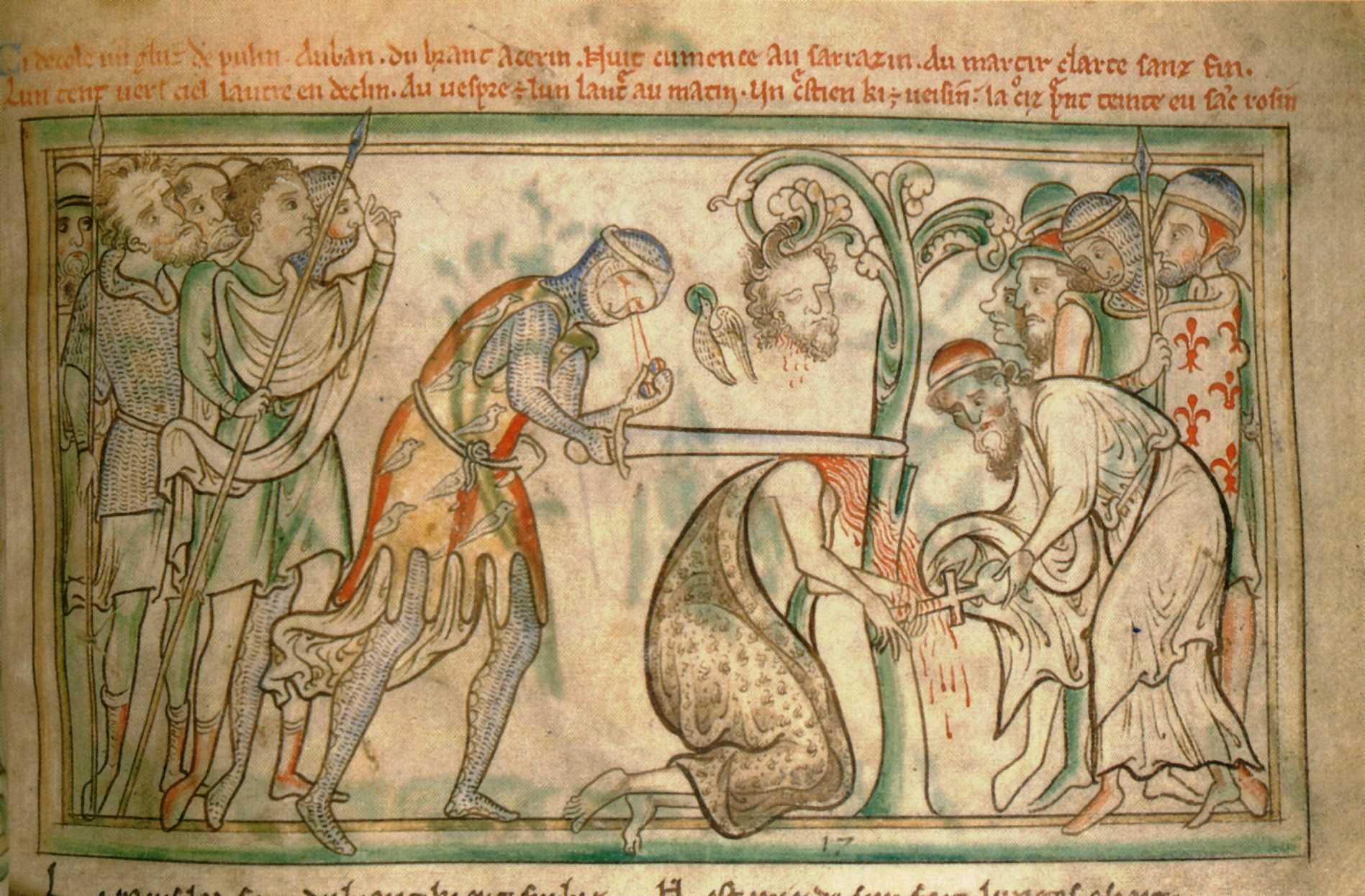
The martyrdom of St Alban, a miniature from a 13th-century manuscript written and illustrated by Matthew Paris, now in Trinity College Library, Dublin; here, the executioner's eyes are depicted falling out of his head, concurring with Bede's account.

When Alban reached the summit of the hill, he began to thirst and prayed God would give him water. A spring immediately sprang up at his feet. It was there that his head was struck off, as well as the head of the first Roman soldier who was miraculously converted and refused to execute him. However, immediately after delivering the fatal stroke, the eyes of the second executioner popped out of his head and dropped to the ground, along with Alban's head, so that this second executioner could not rejoice over Alban's death.

=== Other legends ===
In later legends, Alban's head rolled downhill after his execution, and a well sprang up where it stopped. Upon hearing of the miracles, the astonished judge ordered further persecutions to cease, and he began to honour the saint's death.

St Albans Cathedral now stands near the believed site of his execution, and a well is at the bottom of the hill, Holywell Hill.

== Sources ==
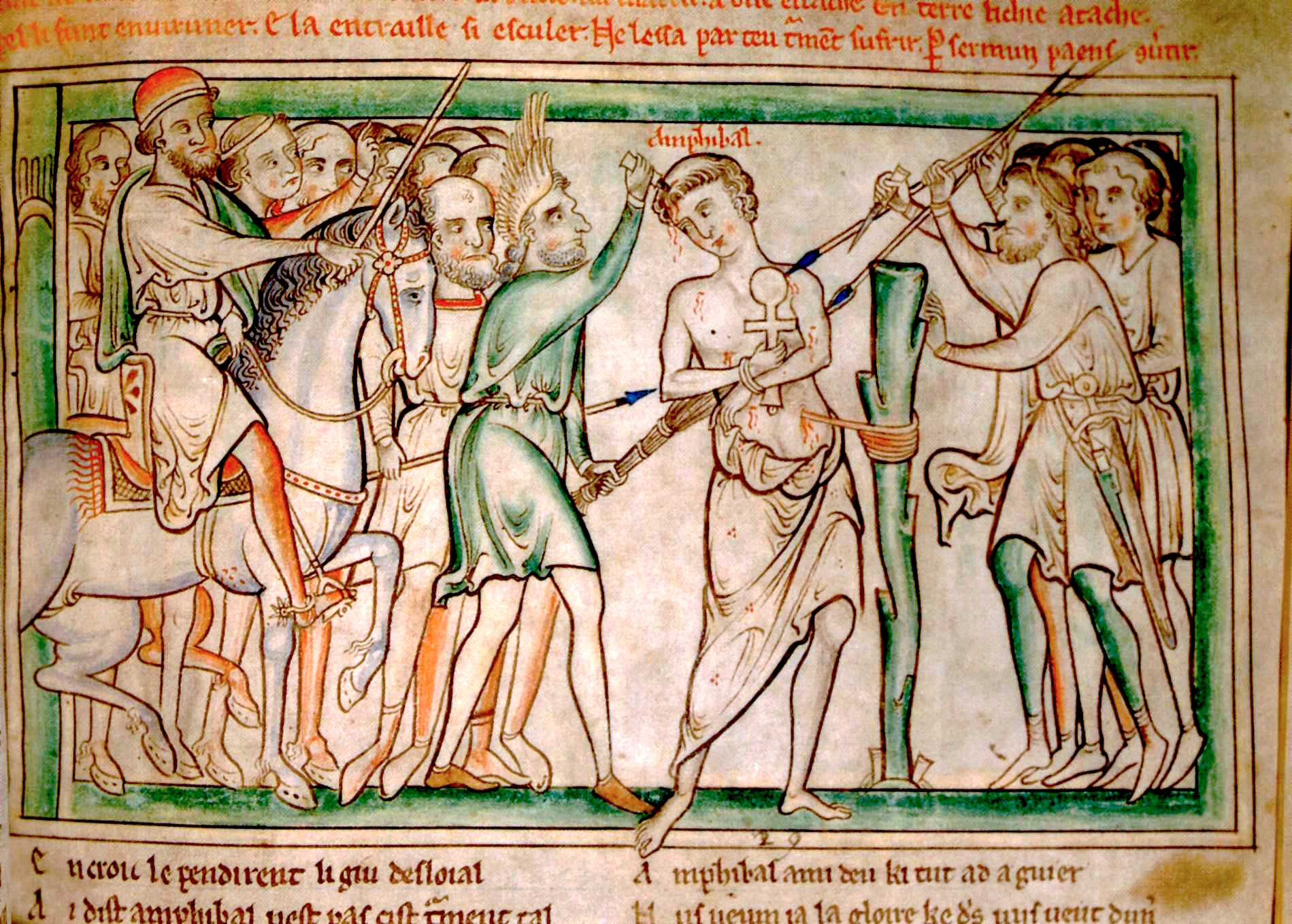
The martyrdom of Amphibalus from the Trinity College Life of St Alban

The earliest mention of Alban's martyrdom is believed to be in Victricius's De Laude Sanctorum (The Praise of Saints), written in c. 396. Victricius had just returned from settling an unnamed dispute among the bishops of Britain. He does not mention Alban by name, but includes an unnamed martyr, who, "in the hands of the executioners told rivers to draw back, lest he should be delayed in his haste." The account closely resembles Alban's martyrdom, and many historians have concluded that this may be a reference to Alban, making it the earliest surviving reference to a British saint. It is not certain, however, that the martyr referred to is truly Alban.

The foundational text concerning Saint Alban is the Passio Albani (The Passion of Alban), which relates the tale of Alban's martyrdom, and Germanus of Auxerre's subsequent visit to the site of Alban's execution. This Passio survives in six manuscripts, with three different recensions, referred to as T, P, and E, the oldest of which dates to the eighth century. The T manuscript is located in Turin, the P manuscript is found in Paris and the E manuscripts (of which there are 4) are at the British Library and Gray's Inn, both in London, and in Autun (France) and Einsiedeln (Switzerland). The Passio is very likely the source text of the more well-known accounts found in Gildas and Bede.

Another early text to mention Alban is the Vita Germani (The Life of Germanus), written in c. 480 by Constantius of Lyon. The text only very briefly mentions Alban but is an important text concerning his nascent cult. According to the Vita, Germanus visited Alban's grave shortly after defeating the Pelagian heresy in Britain and asked Alban to give thanks to God on his behalf. They once again called on him during their voyage home, and Alban is credited with providing smooth sailing for the voyage back to the continent.

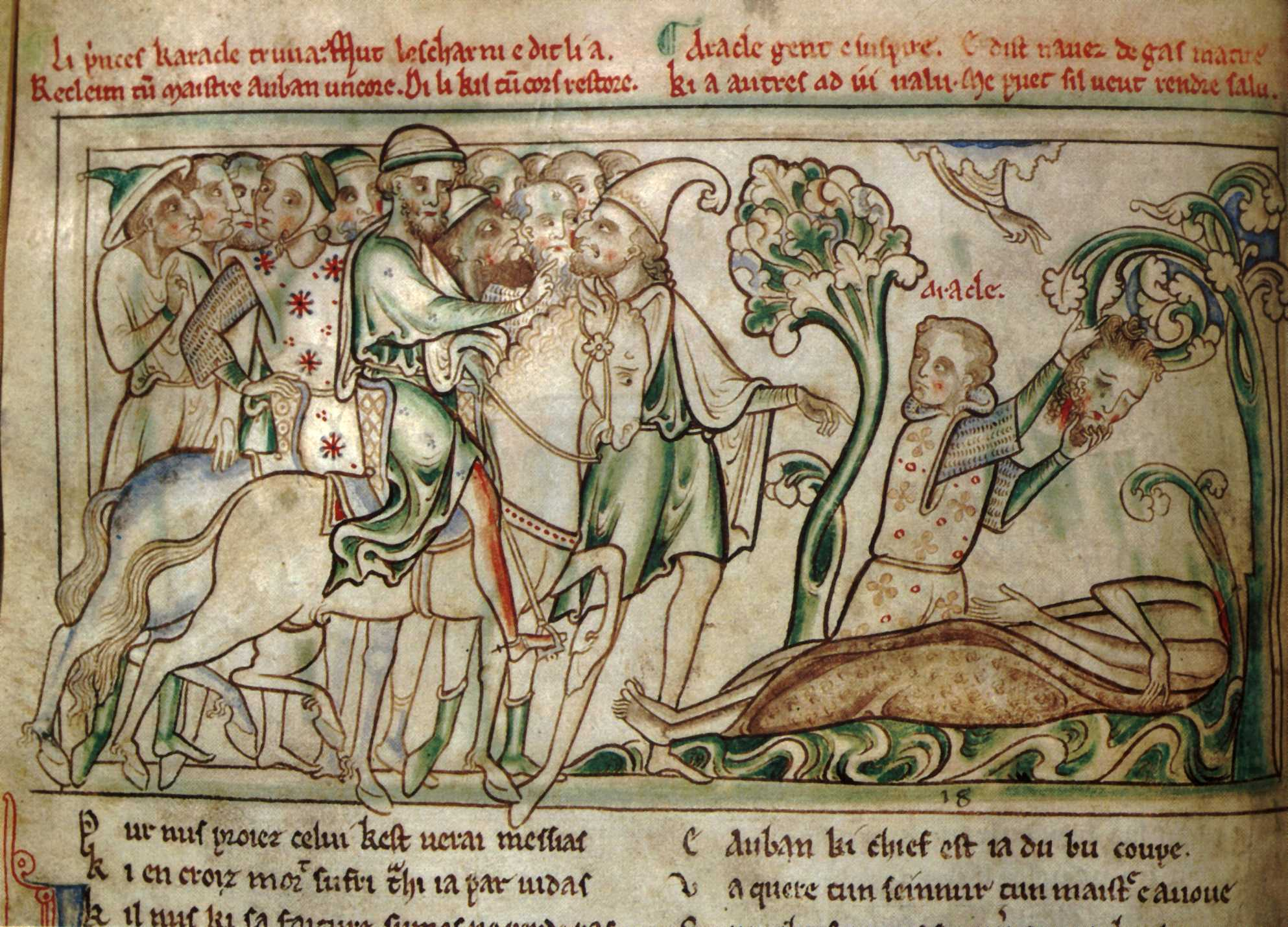
Framed tinted drawing of Heraclius taking down the head of Saint Alban, from the Trinity College Life

Gildas gives a short account of Alban's martyrdom in his De Excidio et Conquestu Britanniae (On the Ruin and Conquest of Britain) written in c. 570, and Bede gives a much fuller account in his Ecclesiastical History of the English People (c. 730). Gildas calls Alban a martyr of Verulamium but says he crossed the river Thames prior to his execution, during the persecution of Diocletian. Bede's account is much more detailed but sets the events during the reign of Septimius Severus and in the town of Verulamium, where a shrine devoted to Alban had been established by at least AD 429, when Germanus of Auxerre is said to have visited the cult centre during his tour of Britain. Alban is also briefly mentioned in the Anglo-Saxon Chronicle (c. 900), and by Geoffrey of Monmouth in Historia Regum Britanniae (c. 1136). It is also possible that his martyrdom is referenced in the Acta Martyrum.

Another early source for Saint Alban is the Martyrologium Hieronymianum (Martyrology of Saint Jerome) in which the entry In Britannia Albani martyris probably occurred originally under 22 June. In fact, in the extant versions, Alban has acquired numerous companions because of confusion or conflation with other entries. The martyrology is preserved in a ninth-century copy but was probably composed in something close to its present form around AD 600, with the surviving recension showing some signs of being based on a recension compiled at Auxerre (significantly, the hometown of Saint Germanus) For Thornhill (see above), the date given for Alban's martyrdom is striking for its closeness to the summer solstice (on which some variants of the Hieronymianum actually place the saint's day). Being the day when the sun is at its brightest in midsummer, that might suggest that there is indeed some significance in the literal meaning of the name Albanus (or at least the root albho- on which it is based) as 'white' or 'bright'.

Matthew Paris, a medieval English chronicler and monk of St Alban's Abbey, produced a beautifully-illustrated Life of St Alban in the thirteenth century, which is in French verse adapted from a Latin Life of St Alban by William of St Albans, c. 1178. It is now at the Trinity College Library in Dublin, Ireland.

== Disputed topics ==
=== Dating ===
The date of Alban's execution has never been firmly established. Original sources and modern historians indicate a range of dates between 209 and 313.

The Anglo-Saxon Chronicle lists the year 283, but Bede places it in 305, "when the cruel Emperors first published their edicts against the Christians." In other words, it was sometime after the publication of the edicts by Eastern Roman Emperor Diocletian in 303 and before the proclamation of toleration in the Edict of Milan by co-ruling Roman Emperors Constantine I and Licinius, in 313. Bede was probably following Gildas.

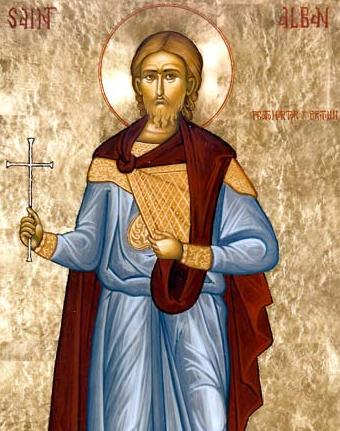
Contemporary Eastern Orthodox icon of Saint Alban. The martyr's cross and red robe represent his martyrdom, the latter specifically representing the blood shed during it.

English historian John Morris suggests that Alban's martyrdom took place during the persecutions of Emperor Septimius Severus in 209. Morris bases his claims on the Turin version of the Passio Albani, unknown to Bede, which states, "Alban received a fugitive cleric and put on his garment and his cloak (habitu et caracalla) that he was wearing and delivered himself up to be killed instead of the priest… and was delivered immediately to the evil Caesar Severus." According to Morris, Gildas knew the source but mistranslated the name "Severus" as an adjective, wrongly identifying the emperor as Diocletian. Bede accepted the identification as fact and dates Alban's martyrdom to this later period. As Morris points out, Diocletian reigned only in the East and would not have been involved in British affairs in 304; Emperor Severus, however, was in Britain from 208 to 211. Morris thus dates Alban's death to 209. However, the mention of Severus in the Turin version has been shown to be an interpolation into an original text, which mentioned only a iudex or 'judge'. Subsequent scholars (e.g. William Hugh Clifford Frend and Charles Thomas) have argued that such a single, localised British martyrdom in 209 would have been unusual, and they have suggested the period of 251–259 (under the persecutors Decius or Valerian) is more likely.

=== Location ===
While it is certain that the cult devoted to Saint Alban was established in Verulamium, and his martyrdom was also alleged to have taken place there, the sources are unclear about where he was actually executed. Neither Victricius's De Laude Sanctorum nor the Passio Albani mentions where he was martyred other than that it was in Britain. In the Vita Germani, Germanus visits Alban's tomb and touches droplets of his blood still on the ground, but the text does not name the location of the tomb. It is not until Gildas that Alban was connected with Verulamium.

=== Historicity ===
Little is known about the historical Alban (estimated to have died c. 209 – AD 305, depending on interpretations), as there are no contemporaneous accounts of his martyrdom and the major sources on his life were written hundreds of years after his death, containing wondrous embellishments, which may or may not refer to real events.

Saint Alban was long regarded as a genuine martyr saint, the protomartyr of Britain, and for much of the twentieth century controversy centred on the date of his martyrdom (see further 'Dating controversy', above). More recently, however, some researchers have taken a more sceptical view of his historicity. In the view of Robin Lane Fox, not only is St Alban's date disputable but so is his very existence.

In 2008 the historian Ian Wood proposed that Alban was an 'invention' of Germanus of Auxerre. Germanus visited Britain in 429, as is known from the nearly-contemporary mention by Prosper of Aquitaine. His chronicle, in the entry for the year 429 (published in 433), states:

Agricola, a Pelagian, the son of the Pelagian bishop Severianus, corrupted the British churches by the insinuation of his doctrine. But at the persuasion of the deacon Palladius, Pope Celestine sent Germanus, bishop of Auxerre, as his representative, and having rejected the heretics, directed the British to the catholic faith.

Meanwhile, it was recorded in the Vita Germani, written probably sometime between 450 and 485 by Constantius of Lyons, that he, together with his fellow bishop Lupus, having stamped out the heresy of Pelagianism in Britain, visited the tomb of Saint Alban:

When this damnable heresy had thus been stamped out, its authors refuted, and the minds of all re-established in the true faith, the bishops visited the shrine of the blessed martyr Alban, to give thanks to God through him. (Vita Germani 12)

The martyr Alban is also mentioned, one more time, in the context of Germanus's return journey, by sea:

Their own merits and the intercession of Alban the Martyr secured for them a calm voyage; and a good ship brought them back in peace to their expectant people. (Vita Germani 13)

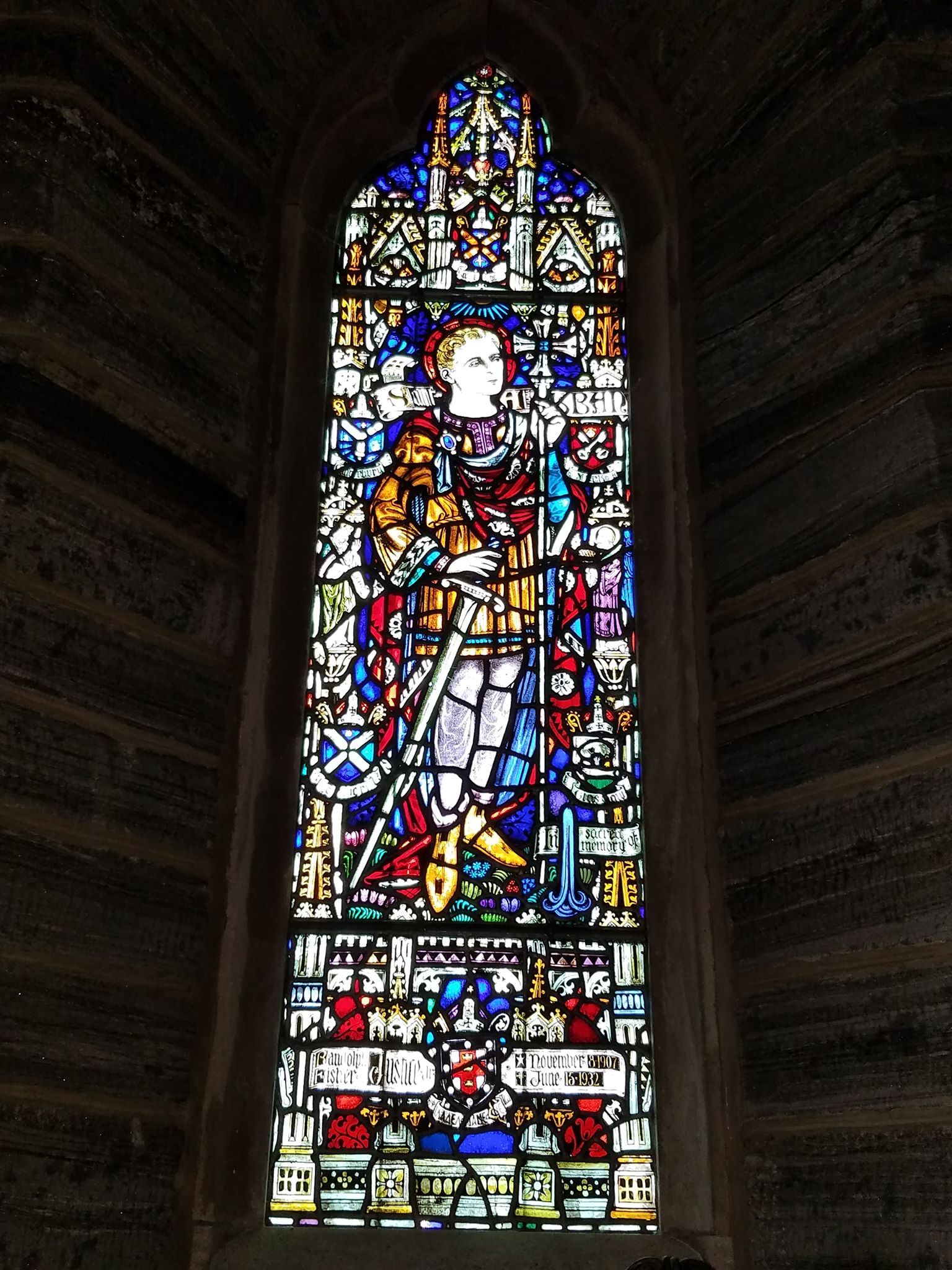
St. Alban window at Church of the Good Shepherd (Rosemont, Pennsylvania)

The Vita Germani was long regarded as the earliest source for the martyr Alban, but recent research by Richard Sharpe has suggested the earliest version of the Passio Albani (the official story of the saint's martyrdom) may be even earlier (see below and Sources). Wood's argument was based partly on the idea that the name Albanus is suggestive of Albion as the oldest name for Britain, but for him, the name Alban suggested simply 'the man from Albion' rather than an actual 'personification' of the island and its people. It is, in any case, a part of what suggested to Wood that "it is Germanus who gives Alban a name". That, in turn, encouraged him in his conclusion: "The story of the saint's martyrdom seems to have been revealed to, or invented by, Germanus in the context of his anti-Pelagian mission" and in a later article "Alban may, therefore, have been 'discovered' by the bishop of Auxerre".

The argument has been accepted by, for instance, Michael Garcia but disputed by, for instance, historian Nick Higham, who, in an article written in 2014, noted that since Germanus brought relics of continental saints with him, which, so the Passio relates, he deposits in the tomb of Saint Alban while removing some bloodstained earth to take back to Gaul, he must have known from the start that he would make a visit to the cult-centre of Saint Alban, as part of his campaign against Pelagianism. On this basis he states: "This would make good sense in terms of his mission, claiming Britain's most famous cult for Catholicism". He therefore argues against the conclusion of Woods and Garcia that the martyr Alban was unknown before being invented by Germanus.

Key to the argument is a passage in the T version of the Passio that Sharpe has convincingly argued represents an 'interpolation' to the more original E text. All extant versions of the Passio mention (after describing the story of the saint's martyrdom) Germanus's visit to the tomb of Saint Alban. The E version, followed essentially by the T version, states (in the translation of Sharpe):

When Germanus came to Alban's basilica, carrying with him relics of all the apostles and of several martyrs...

but interpolated at this point in only the T version is

...Alban had revealed himself to Germanus on his journey, and now, so Germanus himself relates, St Alban met him on the stormy seas. But while he had been keeping vigil at night in his basilica, in the dawn when he had given in to sleep St. Alban appeared to him and communicated to him by revelation to him what had happened at the time of his martyrdom and he made this public in order that the events should be preserved in writing on placards....

after which the T version essentially follows the E version again:

...he ordered the graves to be opened for him to place precious gifts in the same place, in order that the lodging of a single grave might hold membra of saints brought together from various regions whom heaven had received as equal in merit. Once these were honourably disposed and united, with violent devotion and a pious boldness of faith he took from the place where the blood of the martyr had flowed a lump of earth in which it was visible that the ground was red with blood preserved from the martyr's death while the persecutor was pale. When all these things were revealed and made known a huge crowd of people was brought to God with the help of our Lord Jesus Christ to whom is honour and glory for ever and ever. Amen.

It is possible to deduce from the interpolated passage that the name of the martyr was unknown before being revealed to Germanus, either in a vision he had of the martyr during his sea journey or in the dream he had in the basilica. It is also possible to deduce that it was simply the acta, or 'story of the martyrdom', of an already well-known figure that was revealed to Germanus. The acta were then written down in tituli (translated above as 'placards'): that is possibly engraved in the walls of a church with illustrations. This might have been either in a church in Auxerre (Germanus's home town in Gaul) as argued by Sharpe and Wood, or in Britain. If the latter is the case, by being on public display, they might have served to give a definitive version of the saint's martyrdom, which could not be contradicted or reinterpreted (for instance by the addition of 'Pelagian' themes) In any case, it has been argued by Sharpe and Wood that these acta written down in tituli were actually the original, very simple and short, first version of the Passio Albani that has come down in the 'E' and later versions That is very possible but, of course, quite unprovable, but it seems clear that the Passio originates with the circle of Germanus at Auxerre. As time went on, more and more details and wondrous events were added to the account, reaching its most detailed version in Bede's 8th century Ecclesiastical History of the English People.

The location of the tomb of Saint Alban that Germanus visited is most often thought to have been Verulamium, now St Albans. That is on the basis of what is in fact the earliest mention of the martyr Alban in an indigenous British source, in the De Excidio et Conquestu Britanniae probably written in the second quarter of the fifth century, by the British author Gildas. As part of his brief historical account, he describes the persecution of Christians in Britain, which he identifies as part of the persecution of Diocletian, adding at the end of a passage about "their graves and the places where they suffered": "I refer to Saint Alban of Verulam (Verolamiensem), Aaron and Iulius, citizens of Caerleon (Legionum Urbis) and others of both sexes, who in different places, displayed the highest spirit in the battle-line of Christ". (De Excidio 10)

The Verulamium location is supported by the fact that the topography of the Passio can be broadly, if not quite exactly, matched to that of Verulamium, and Bede describes an important cult of Saint Alban there, by the early eighth century at least. Some doubt, however, is encouraged by the fact that in his account of Albans's martyrdom Gildas (De Excidio 11) describes the martyr as crossing the Thames to his place of execution (at Verulamium and modern-day St Albans there is only the much smaller River Ver), which some have taken as an indication that the actual martyrdom (or the more original version of the story about it) was located in Londinium.

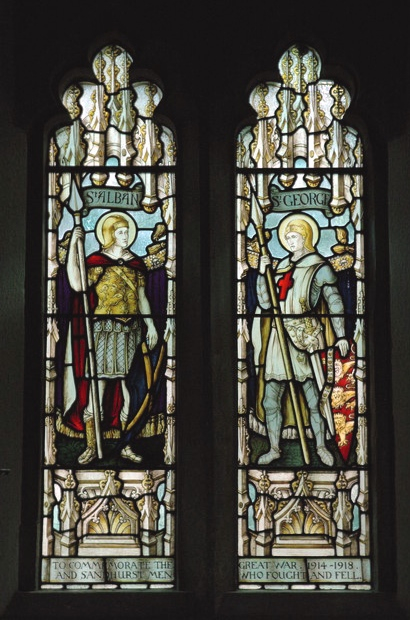
Stained glass window depicting Saint Alban and Saint George, another martyr and the patron saint of England

== Cult ==
The hilltop located outside Verulamium eventually became the centre of the cult devoted to Alban. It has been claimed (but doubted by some) that a memoria over the execution point and holding the relics of Alban may have existed at the site from c. 300, possibly earlier. There was certainly a cult centre of Saint Alban at Verulamium by the time of Bede c. 731, and the mention in Gildas strongly suggests that it was already in existence by the early sixth century. However, when and how the cult of Saint Alban originated is the subject of some debate: there is little textual or archaeological evidence that a cult of Saint Alban existed before Germanus of Auxerre visited the site in 429. In fact, one version of the Passio Albani says that Germanus did not know the name or story of Saint Alban before visiting the site, and Alban appeared to him in a dream to reveal his identity and martyrdom story. That can be interpreted as suggesting that the cult of Saint Alban did not exist before the arrival of Germanus. Germanus is said to have taken away dust from the site, which was still marked with Alban's blood. The cult and veneration of saints was still in its infancy at this time, and it has been suggested that Germanus had a hand in creating and promoting the cult of Saint Alban.

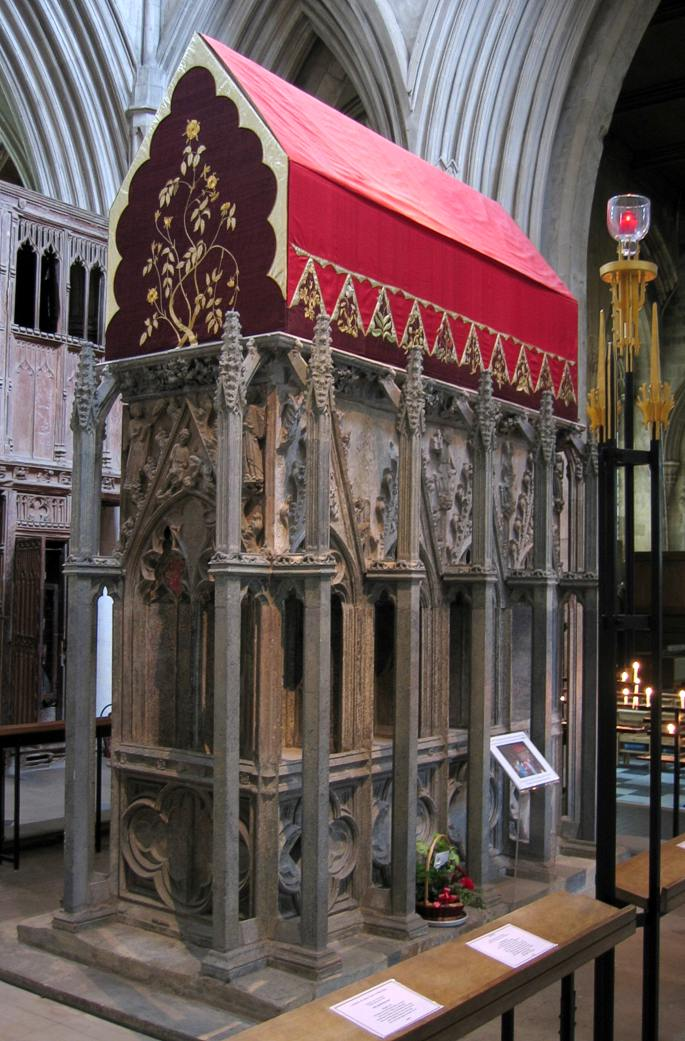
Shrine of Saint Alban in St Albans Cathedral

Gildas writing in the late fifth or early sixth century calls Saint Alban Verolamiensis (of Verulamium) in a passage that refers to the "graves and places where they suffered" of the early British martyrs. This suggests there was at least a shrine but quite possibly a church to him at Verulamium by then. Certainly, Bede (c. 720) mentions a church there, dedicated to him. Offa of Mercia established a Benedictine Abbey and monastery at the site c. 793, but the abbey was probably sacked and destroyed by the Danes c. 890. It was rebuilt by the Normans, with construction beginning in 1077. By the High Middle Ages, St Albans was ranked as the premier abbey in England. The abbey church now serves as the cathedral of the Diocese of St Albans, established in 1877.

In a chapel east of the crossing and high altar are remains of the fourteenth-century marble shrine of St Alban. In June 2002 a scapula (shoulder blade), believed to be a relic of St Alban, was presented to St Albans Cathedral and placed inside the saint's restored 13th-century shrine. The bone was given by the Church of St Pantaleon in Cologne, Germany. St Pantaleon's, like St Albans Cathedral a former Benedictine abbey church that had a shrine dedicated to St Alban, has possessed remains believed to be those of St Alban since the 10th century. It is entirely possible that further relics were acquired by the church in the 16th century at the time of the dissolution of the monasteries in England when many such relics were smuggled abroad to prevent their destruction. St Albans Abbey was dissolved in 1539.

The largest relic of Saint Alban in England is the thigh of the protomartyr preserved at St Michael's Benedictine Abbey, Farnborough, Hampshire, which was transferred from the St Pantaleon's reliquary in the 1950s.

=== On continental Europe ===
There has also been an extensive cult of Saint Alban on the Continent from an early date such as in Mainz, Cologne and Basel on the Rhine as well as a number of other localities in Switzerland and Italy and a notable concentration in the French Alpine regions and the Rhone Valley. Sometimes, the 'Saint Alban' concerned is regarded as a separate figure, other times, he is alternatively called Albinus (and often identified with sixth-century abbot and bishop Saint Albinus of Angers), and at other times he is identified with the British martyr.

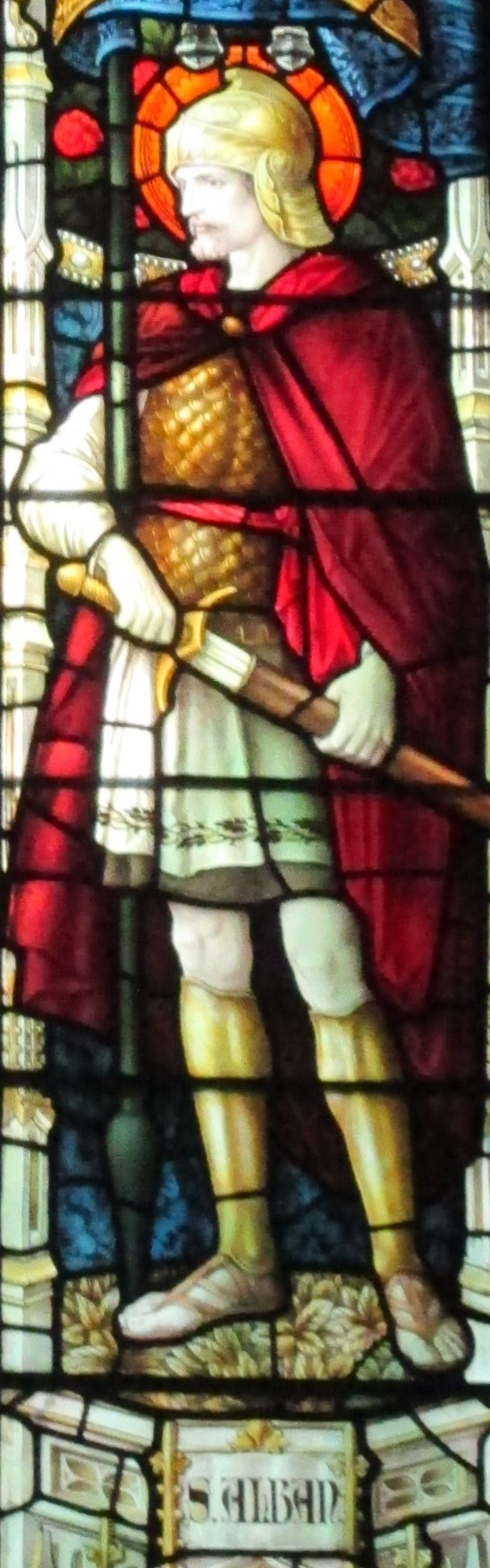
Stained-glass window depicting Saint Alban as a soldier in Lancaster Priory, designed by Carl Almquist.

Saint Pantaleon's Church, Cologne holds relics said to be those of the British martyr Alban (as noted above). In fact, although identified with the British martyr, he was locally known as Albinus. His relics were said to have been brought from Rome by Empress Theophanu and placed in St Pantaleon's church in about 984: the relics were miraculously saved from destruction in an accident on the way at a place that a later version of 1502, was identified as Silenen, Switzerland. The original record was in a 12th-century manuscript that alleged that the relics were actually those of the British martyr, having been delivered to Ravenna by Germanus himself and taken from there to Rome. Another church at Cologne is known to have been dedicated to the British Alban from the 12th century.

The Saint Alban of Basel is recorded in the Berne recension of the Martyrologium Hieronymianum of c. 800: "Basilea civitate sancti Albani martyris", where he would appear to be an independent local figure, being celebrated on 24 August but later identified with the Saint Alban of Mainz.

Alban of Mainz is recorded from 756. He was regarded as a separate figure in sources from Raban Maur's early ninth-century martyrology, including a tenth-century Life by Gozwin of 1060–2 However, Hippolyte Delehaye suggested that he very probably represents, in origin, a localised version of the British martyr since his feast date was recorded as 21 June in the Martyrologium Hieronymianum (just a day before that of the British one, who actually appears on the 21st and 22nd in early recensions).

The story in Raban Maur associates Alban of Mainz with a martyred bishop, Aureus of Mainz and two other martyrs, Ursus and Theonestus the latter of whom is said to have originated on the Greek island of Naxos, together with Alban. A Saint Alban of Burano (near Altino, Italy), meanwhile was associated with one Domenicus in a legendary tale reminiscent of one told about Dionysus.

== Veneration ==
Alban is remembered in the Church of England with a Lesser Festival on 22 June and he continues to be venerated in the Anglican, Roman Catholic, and Eastern Orthodox Communions. The Fellowship of Saint Alban and Saint Sergius is also named in part after Alban.

Every year, during the weekend closest to his feast day, St Albans Cathedral hosts the "Alban Pilgrimage", with huge puppets re-enacting the events of Alban's martyrdom around the city of St Albans.

=== Churches ===
==== United Kingdom ====
Besides his abbey, churches in England dedicated to Saint Alban include the former St Alban, Wood Street in the City of London, St Alban's Church at Holborn in central London, ones in the London suburbs of Teddington, Croydon, Cheam and Ilford, one in Westcliff-on-Sea in Essex, others in Hull and Withernwick in the East Riding of Yorkshire, one in Swaythling, Southampton, one in Northampton, one in a Norwich suburb, one in Bristol, one in Tattenhall, Cheshire and another in Macclesfield, Cheshire. There is also St Alban's, West Leigh near Havant in Hampshire, and the St Alban the Martyr Parish Church of Highgate, Birmingham (including Ark St Alban's Academy). and St Alban the Martyr Church, Cowley, Oxford. Finally, a church is dedicated to Saint Alban at Earsdon Village, Northumberland, which is the nearest one to Bede's Holy Island. There is also a St Albans parish and church in Splott, Cardiff.

==== Denmark ====
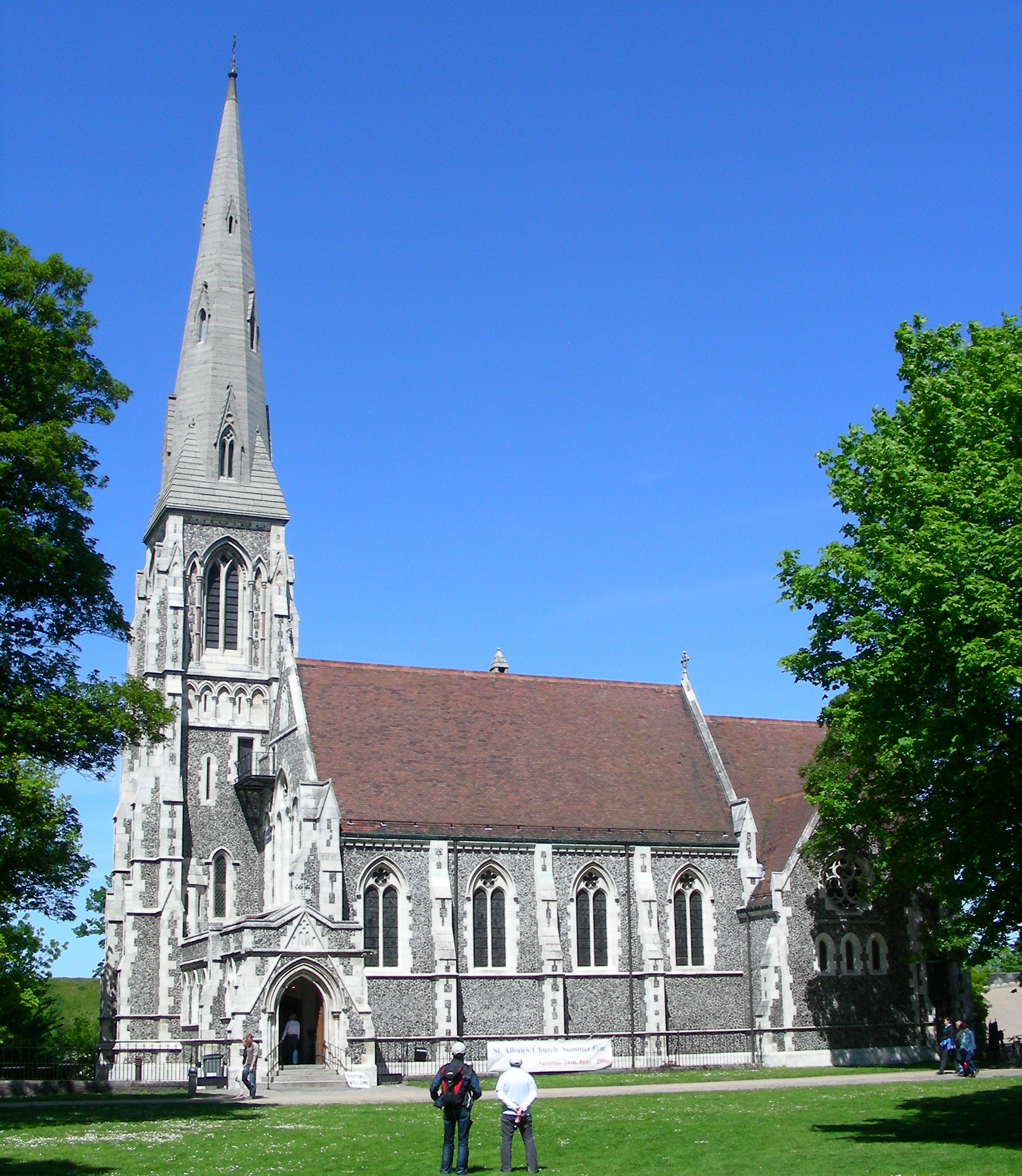
St Alban's Church, the only Anglican church in Copenhagen

St Alban's Church in Copenhagen, Denmark is the city's only Anglican church. It was built to the design of Sir Arthur Blomfield and consecrated in 1887. The connection with Denmark goes back to the Middle Ages where a church dedicated to Saint Alban was built in Odense. Supposedly, the relics of the saint had been brought here, maybe as early as the ninth century. It was in that church that King Canute IV of Denmark was murdered in 1086. The original church no longer exists, but the Roman Catholic parish church of Odense, St Alban's Church, was consecrated in 1908.

==== Germany ====
Saint Pantaleon's Church, Cologne, a former Benedictine abbey church, has held a shrine to St Alban since the 10th century. Some relics are believed to have ended up in the church in order to keep them safe from destruction after the dissolution of the monasteries by King Henry VIII of England in the 16th century. In 2002, a collar bone, one of the relics in the shrine, was moved to St Albans Cathedral in England, and placed in the shrine to Saint Alban there.

==== United States ====
St. Albans is the name of a community in the borough of Queens in New York City. In 1899, a year after Queens became part of New York City, the new post office for the 600 residents was named St. Albans, after St Albans in Hertfordshire, England, which itself was named after Saint Alban. The name had been in use for the area since at least 1894 for the name of the school district, and the LIRR station was named St. Albans when it opened in 1898. A 1909 map also shows a St Albans Avenue and a St Albans Place in the area.

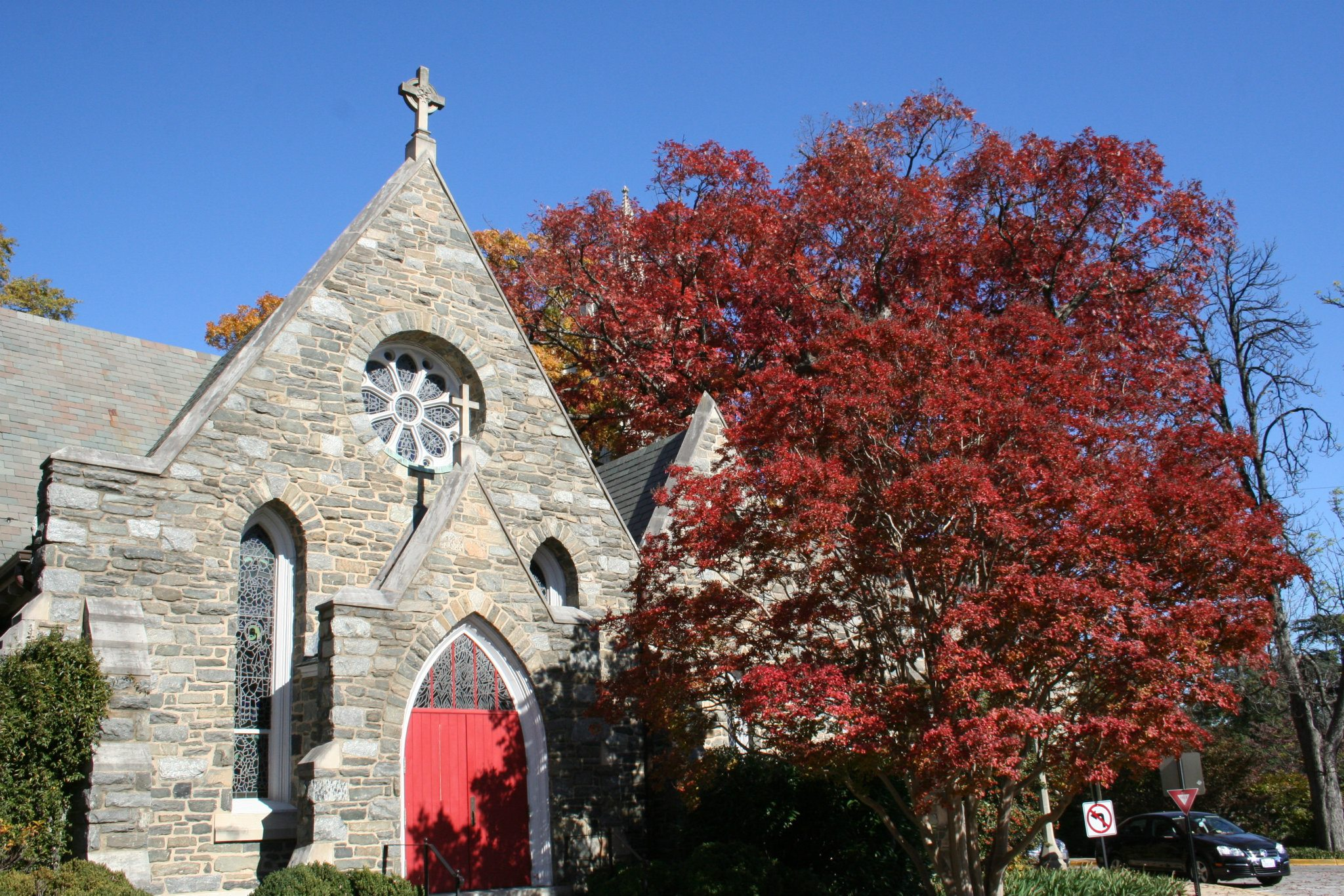
St Alban's Parish, Washington, D.C.

The parish church of St Alban's Episcopal Church in Washington, D.C., was erected on Mount Saint Alban in 1854 using a bequest from a young woman, Phoebe Nourse, who earned the money sewing. St Alban's went on to found five mission churches in Washington, four of which still maintain active congregations of their own. Washington National Cathedral, a cathedral of the Episcopal Church in Washington D.C., is located next to the parish church, which preceded the laying of the cathedral's cornerstone by 53 years. The St Albans School for Boys, which is affiliated with and was established in 1909 soon after the construction of the cathedral began, is also named for the saint.

In 1928, St. Alban's Chapel, an Episcopalian church, was established on the campus of Louisiana State University in Baton Rouge, Louisiana.

In 1972, a chapel named after St. Alban was erected and later consecrated in the Sabino Catchment area of Tucson, Arizona. The chapel and the congregation later became St. Alban's Church and Parish. It was in this church that the second Anglican female priest, and first female priest in Arizona, was ordained.

== See also ==
- Catholic Church in England
- List of early Christian saints
- List of protomartyrs
- Saint Alban's Cross
- St. Alban's Church (disambiguation)
- St. Alban's Episcopal Church (disambiguation)
