= Tribune =

Elected Roman officials

Tribune (Latin: Tribunus) was the title of various elected officials in ancient Rome. The two most important were the tribunes of the plebs and the military tribunes. For most of Roman history, a college of ten tribunes of the plebs acted as a check on the authority of the Roman Senate and the annual magistrates, holding the power of ius intercessionis to intervene on behalf of the plebeians, and veto unfavourable legislation. There were also military tribunes, who commanded portions of the Roman army, subordinate to higher magistrates, such as the consuls and praetors, promagistrates, and their legates. Various officers within the Roman army were also known as tribunes. The title was also used for several other positions and classes in the course of Roman history.

== Tribal tribunes ==
The word tribune is derived from the Roman tribes. The three original tribes known as the Ramnes or Ramnenses, Tities or Titienses, and the Luceres, were each headed by a tribune, who represented each tribe in civil, religious, and military matters. Subsequently, each of the Servian tribes was also represented by a tribune.

== Tribune of the celeres ==
Under the Roman Kingdom, the tribunus celerum, in English tribune of the celeres, or tribune of the knights, was commander of the king's personal bodyguard, known as the celeres. This official was second only to the king, and had the authority to pass law, known as lex tribunicia, and to preside over the comitia curiata. Unless the king himself elected to lead the cavalry into battle, this responsibility fell to the tribune of the celeres. In theory he could deprive the king of his imperium, or authority to command, with the agreement of the comitia curiata.

In the reign of Lucius Tarquinius Superbus, the last Roman king, this office was held by Lucius Junius Brutus, the king's nephew, and thus the senior member of the king's household, after the king himself and his sons. It was Brutus who convened the comitia and asked that they revoke the king's imperium. After the fall of the monarchy, the powers of the tribune of the celeres were divided between the Magister Militum, or Master of the Infantry, also known as the Praetor Maximus or dictator, and his lieutenant, the magister equitum or "Master of the Horse".

== Tribune of the plebs ==
The tribuni plebis, known in English as tribunes of the plebs, tribunes of the people, or plebeian tribunes, were instituted in 494 BC, after the first secession of the plebs, to protect the interests of the plebeians against the actions of the senate and the annual magistrates, who were uniformly patrician. The ancient sources indicate the tribunes may have originally been two or five in number. If the former, the college of tribunes was expanded to five in 470 BC. Either way, the college was increased to ten in 457 BC, and remained at this number throughout Roman history. They were assisted by two aediles plebis, or plebeian aediles. Only plebeians were eligible for these offices, although at least two exceptions existed.

The tribunes of the plebs had the power to convene the concilium plebis, or plebeian assembly, and propose legislation before it. Only one of the tribunes could preside over this assembly, which had the power to pass laws affecting only the plebeians, known as plebiscita, or plebiscites. After 287 BC, the decrees of the concilium plebis had the effect of law over all Roman citizens. By the 3rd century BC, the tribunes could also convene and propose legislation before the senate.

Although sometimes referred to as "plebeian magistrates," technically the tribunes of the plebs were not magistrates, having been elected by the plebeians alone, and not the whole Roman people. However, they were sacrosanct, and the whole body of the plebeians were pledged to protect the tribunes against any assault or interference with their persons during their terms of office. Anyone who violated the sacrosanctity of the tribunes might be killed without penalty.

This was also the source of the tribunes' power, known as ius intercessionis, or intercessio, by which any tribune could intercede on behalf of a Roman citizen to prohibit the act of a magistrate or other official. Citizens could appeal the decisions of the magistrates to the tribunes, who would then be obliged to determine the legality of the action before a magistrate could proceed. This power also allowed the tribunes to forbid, or veto any act of the senate or another assembly. Only a dictator was exempt from these powers.

The tribunicia potestas, or tribunician power, was limited because it was derived from the people's oath to defend the tribunes. This limited most of the tribunes' actions to the boundaries of the city itself, as well as a radius of one mile around. They had no power to affect the actions of provincial governors.

The powers of the tribunes were severely curtailed during the constitutional reforms of the dictator Sulla in 81 BC. Although many of these powers were restored in further reforms of 75 BC and 70 BC, the prestige and authority of the tribunes had been irreparably damaged. In 48 BC, the senate granted tribunician powers (tribunicia potestas, powers equivalent to those of a tribune without actually being one) to the dictator Julius Caesar. Caesar used them to prevent the other tribunes interfering with his actions. In 23 BC, the senate granted the same power to Augustus, the first Roman emperor, and from that point onwards it was regularly granted to each emperor as part of their formal titles. Under the Roman Empire, the tribunes continued to be elected, but had lost their independence and most of their practical power. The office became merely a step in the political careers of plebeians who aspired toward a seat in the senate.

== Military tribunes ==
The tribuni militum, known in English as military tribunes or literally, tribunes of the soldiers, were elected each year along with the annual magistrates. Their number varied throughout Roman history, but eventually reached twenty-four. These were usually young men in their late twenties who aspired to a senatorial career. Each tribune would be assigned to command a portion of the Roman army, subordinate to the magistrates and promagistrates appointed by the senate, and their legates.

Within each of the legions, various middle-ranking officers were also styled tribune. These officers included:

- Tribunus laticlavius, a senatorial officer, second in command of a legion; identified by a broad stripe, or laticlavus.
- Tribunus angusticlavius, an officer chosen from among the equites, five to each legion; identified by a narrow stripe, or angusticlavus.
- Tribunus rufulus, an officer chosen by the commander.
- Tribunus vacans, an unassigned officer in the Late Roman army; a member of the general's staff.
- Tribunus cohortis, an officer commanding a cohort, part of a legion usually consisting of six centuries.
- Tribunus cohortis urbanae, commander of one of the urban cohorts, a sort of military police unit akin to a gendarmerie stationed at Rome.
- Tribunus sexmestris, a tribune serving a tour of duty of only six months; there is no evidence to identify this officer as a cavalry commander, as sometimes stated in modern literature.

In the late Roman army, a tribunus was a senior officer, sometimes called a comes, who commanded a cavalry vexillatio. As tribounos, the title survived in the East Roman army until the early 7th century.

From the use of tribunus to describe various military officers is derived the word tribunal, originally referring to a raised platform used to address the soldiers or administer justice.

Military tribunes are featured in notable works of historical fiction, including Ben-Hur: A Tale of the Christ, by Lew Wallace (1880), and The Robe by Lloyd C. Douglas (1942). Both novels involve characters affected by the life and death of Jesus, and were turned into epic films during the 1950s. Messala, the primary antagonist in Ben-Hur, was played by Stephen Boyd, while Marcellus Gallio, the protagonist of The Robe, was played by a young Richard Burton.

== Consular tribunes ==
In 445 BC, the tribunes of the plebs succeeded in passing the lex Canuleia, repealing the law forbidding the intermarriage of patricians and plebeians, and providing that one of the consuls might be a plebeian. Rather than permit the consular dignity to pass into the hands of a plebeian, the senate proposed a compromise whereby three military tribunes, who might be either patrician or plebeian, should be elected in place of the consuls. The first tribuni militum consulare potestate, or military tribunes with consular power, were elected for the year 444. Although plebeians were eligible for this office, each of the first "consular tribunes" was a patrician.

Military tribunes were elected in place of the consuls in half the years from 444 to 401 BC, and in each instance, all of the tribunes were patricians; nor did any plebeian succeed in obtaining the consulship. The number of tribunes increased to four beginning in 426, and six beginning in 405. At last, the plebeians elected four of their number military tribunes for the year 400; others were elected in 399, 396, 383, and 379. But apart from these years, no plebeian obtained the highest offices of the Roman State.

The patricians' monopoly on power was finally broken by Gaius Licinius Calvus Stolo and Lucius Sextius Lateranus, tribunes of the people, who in 376 BC brought forward legislation demanding not merely that one of the consuls might be a plebeian, but that henceforth one must be chosen from their order. When the senate refused their demand, the tribunes prevented the election of annual magistrates for five years, before relenting and permitting the election of consular tribunes from 370 to 367. In the end, and with the encouragement of the dictator Marcus Furius Camillus, the senate conceded the battle, and passed the Licinian Rogations. Sextius was elected the first plebeian consul, followed by Licinius two years later; and with this settlement, the consular tribunes were abolished.

== Tribunes of the treasury ==
The exact nature of the Tribuni Aerarii, or Tribunes of the Treasury is shrouded in mystery. Originally they seem to have been tax collectors, but this power was slowly lost to other officials. By the end of the Republic, this style belonged to a class of persons slightly below the equites in wealth. When the makeup of Roman juries was reformed in 70 BC, it was stipulated that one-third of the members of each jury should belong to this class.

== Later uses of the title ==
=== Post-Roman Britain ===
In his Vita Germani, a hagiography of St. Germanus of Auxerre, Constantius of Lyon writes that during his visit to Britain in AD 429, Germanus miraculously healed the blind daughter of "a man with tribunician power" (vir tribunicae potestatis). Being that the Roman Empire had withdrawn from Britain in AD 410, the use of this term may imply a continuation of some form of local Roman political system. There exists the possibility that this tribune had commanded a unit of the Roman army which had disbanded after the break with Rome, and was now occupying a more locally-granted appointment to help manage his city's defences.

=== Republic of Venice ===
In the early history of the Republic of Venice, during the tenure of the sixth Doge Domenico Monegario, Venice instituted a dual Tribunal modeled on the above Roman institution - two new Tribunes being elected each year, with the intention to oversee the Doge and prevent abuse of power (though this aim was not always successfully achieved).

=== French revolutionary tribunat ===
The "Tribunat", the French word for tribunate, derived from the Latin term tribunatus, meaning the office or term of a Roman tribunus (see above), was a collective organ of the young revolutionary French Republic composed of members styled tribun (the French for tribune), which, despite the apparent reference to one of ancient Rome's prestigious magistratures, never held any real political power as an assembly, its individual members no role at all.

It was instituted by Napoleon I Bonaparte's Constitution of the Year VIII "in order to moderate the other powers" by discussing every legislative project, sending its orateurs ("orators", i.e. spokesmen) to defend or attack them in the Corps législatif, and asking the Senate to overturn "the lists of eligibles, the acts of the Legislative Body and those of the government" on account of unconstitutionality. Its 100 members were designated by the Senate from the list of citizens from 25 years up, and annually one fifth was renewed for a five-year term.

When it opposed the first parts of Bonaparte's proposed penal code, he made the Senate nominate 20 new members at once to replace the 20 first opponents to his politic; they accepted the historically important reform of penal law. As the Tribunate opposed new despotic projects, he got the Senate in year X to allow itself to dissolve the Tribunate. In XIII it was further downsized to 50 members. On August 16, 1807, it was abolished and never revived.

== See also ==
- Constitution of the Roman Republic
- List of Roman tribunes
