= Patiens of Lyon =

French Catholic bishop and saint

Patiens of Lyon was bishop of Lyon in the 5th century and recognized as a saint by the Roman Catholic Church. He succeeded Bishop Eucherius (November 16 † 449), and died on September 11 before 494, the year in which his second successor Rusticius began his episcopate.

It was Bishop Patiens who commissioned Constantius of Lyon to write the Vita Germani (Life of Germanus), a hagiography of Germanus of Auxerre. He also built a new cathedral, dedicated to Saint Stephen. Later, in the seventh century, a baptistery dedicated to Saint John was constructed as an accessory building to the church. This later became the site of the Cathédrale Saint-Jean-Baptiste de Lyon.

His contemporary, Sidonius Apollinaris, admired Patiens and said that, despite the austerity of his life, he made himself "all things to all men." He played his part zealously in repressing the heresies of his time; but is especially remembered for his great dedication to the poor, not only of his own Diocese, but of other parts of Gaul. He devoted all his resources to their relief. During a famine, he arrived in Lyon with wheat, by the Rhone and the Saone rivers to feed the population.

His feast day is celebrated on September 11.

Catholic Church titles
Preceded by Eucherius	Bishop of Lyon; 449–491	Succeeded by Lupicinus
