= St. Alban's Church, Odense =

St. Alban's Church
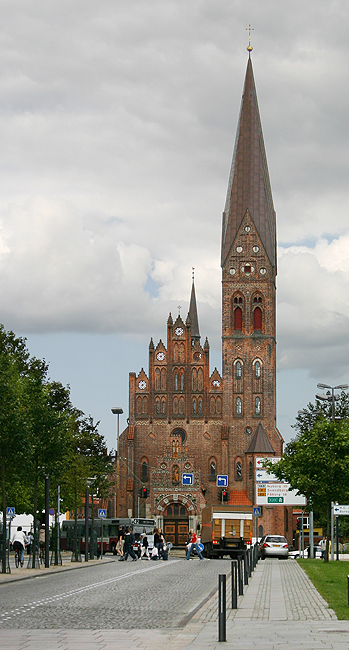
- St. Alban's Church
- 55°23′47″N 10°23′28″E
- Location: Odense
- Country: Denmark
- Denomination: Roman Catholic
- Website: www.sct-albani.dk

History
- Status: Parish church
- Founded: 27 October 1867
- Dedication: Our Lady, Saint Alban, Saint Canute
- Consecrated: 25 October 1908

Architecture
- Functional status: Active

Administration
- Diocese: Copenhagen

St. Alban's Church (Danish: Sankt Albani Kirke) is the Roman Catholic parish church of Odense, Denmark. It should not be confused with the medieval church of St. Alban's Priory where King Canute IV was murdered in 1086, and which was later replaced with St. Canute's Cathedral. The medieval St. Alban's Priory was located at Albani Torv (St. Alban's Square) roughly halfway between St. Canute's Cathedral and St. Alban's Church. A modern stone plaque located at the site of the former church's altar is the only visible sign of this structure.

== History ==
Odense's first Catholic congregation since the Protestant reformation was established in 1867, and consisted of 12 adults and 7 children. In the first few years services were held in rented space, but in 1869 the congregation purchased part of Odense Priory and established St. Mary's church, an all-girls school, and residence for the Sisters of St. Joseph. An additional building was constructed, which housed an all-boys school and homes for the priests.

In 1899 the first Redemptorists arrived from Austria and started collecting funds for the building of a permanent church, receiving considerable contributions from Austria and Germany. The foundation for the new church was placed on October 21, 1906, and on October 25, 1908, the unfinished building was consecrated and dedicated to Our Lady, Saint Alban, and Saint Canute.

The church was - and remains - a focal point for immigrants, namely Germans and Poles, and in recent years also an increasing number of Vietnamese Catholics.

== Architecture ==
The church is a neogothic. The structure was designed by German architect Ludwig Schneider from Breslau. The glass paintings was created by Georg Schneider of Regensburg in Bavaria. The organ was created by the company Gebrüder Rieger, from Jägerndorf in Austrian Silesia, and the altar piece was created in 1908 by Konrad Martiner from Sankt Ulrich in Tyrol.
