= Vita Germani =

Hagiographic text written by Constantius in 5th century AD

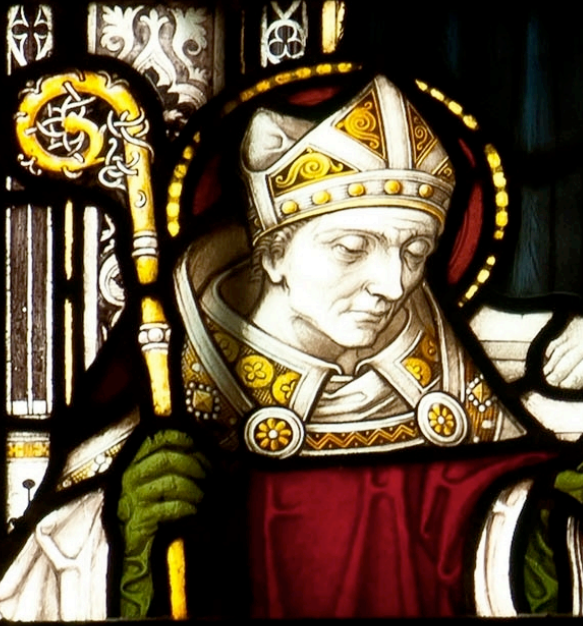
St Germanus of Auxerre

The Vita Germani is a hagiographic text written by Constantius of Lyon in the 5th century AD. It is one of the first hagiographic texts written in Western Europe, and is an important resource for historians studying the origins of saintly veneration and the "cult of saints." It recounts the life and acts of bishop Germanus of Auxerre, who travelled to Britain c. 429 AD, and is the principal source of details about his life. It is one of the few surviving texts from the 5th century with information about Britain and the Pelagian controversy, and is also one of the first texts to identify and promote the cult of Saint Alban.

== Date of Composition ==
Historians disagree on the date of composition of the Vita Germani. Some historians argue that the most probable date of composition is 480 AD, while others place it earlier than c.470. The only evidence available to indicate an exact date of authorship is the surviving letter of dedication, showing that the Vita was dedicated to Patiens, bishop of Lyon. The Vita was most probably dedicated to him while he was still living and serving as bishop, most probably between his ascendancy to the bishopric in 450, and his death in 494.

== Content of The Vita ==
The Vita opens with Germanus' early life: He was born and raised in Auxerre, and received a liberal education. He went on to study law in Rome, and became a notable lawyer, eventually being promoted to the office of dux, and rulership of more than one province. After his ascension to the bishopric of Auxerre (Vita Germani 2), he built a large monastery on the river Yonne near Auxerre (Vita Germani 6). Following this he and a fellow bishop, Lupus of Troyes, were elected by the synod to travel to Britain and preach against the Pelagian heresy. During the first trip (Vita Germani 12-18) – in 429, according to Prosper of Aquitaine – Germanus' ship was beset by a demonic storm while crossing the English Channel. Once in Britain, he debated the Pelagian leaders, and performed the miracle of healing the blind 10-year-old daughter of a man with the traditional Roman rank of Tribune. Having soundly beaten the Pelagians in debate Germanus visited the tomb of Saint Alban (see below) to give thanks. Subsequently, he injured his foot and then miraculously survived an accidental fire. Following on this comes perhaps the most notable episode of the whole trip when Germanus led an outnumbered troop of British soldiers against an attacking army of Saxons and Picts on Easter day. Germanus ordered his troops to give the battle cry of "Alleluia", and the cries were so terrifying to the Saxons that they fled or were drowned in the river, and the British won the battle without striking a blow.

Germanus then returns to Gaul and we are told that there he made a trip to Arles in order to successfully negotiate a reduction in taxes (Vita Germani 19-24). Subsequent to this Germanus made a second voyage to Britain to combat the Pelagian heresy, this time healing the son of Elafius, one of the leading men of the country. After Germanus healed the boy, the whole country was converted to the Catholic faith and gave up the Pelagian heresy completely (Vita Germani 25-27). Having returned to Gaul the next important episode in the Vita concerns Germanus's attempt to mediate on behalf of the Armoricans who had revolted against Roman rule (Vita Germani 28-42). Flavius Aetius, the Roman commander, had enlisted Goar the king of the barbarian Alans to put down the rebellion and Germanus personally confronts this formidable warlord. It is finally while visiting Ravenna to plead on behalf of the Armoricans that Germanus dies.

== Germanus and Saint Alban in the Vita ==
What the Vita says about the cult of Saint Alban is the following. After Germanus has confounded the Pelagians we are told:

    “When this damnable heresy had thus been stamped out, its authors refuted, and the minds of all re-established in the true faith, the bishops visited the shrine of the blessed martyr Alban, to give thanks to God through him.” (Vita Germani 12) 

The martyr Alban is also mentioned, one more time, in the context of Germanus's return journey, by sea:

  “Their own merits and the intercession of Alban the Martyr secured for them a calm voyage; and a good ship brought them back in peace to their expectant people.”  (Vita Germani 13)[5]

Some more information about Germanus's visit to the tomb of the martyr Alban actually comes from some lines added to the official story of the saint's martyrdom, the Passio Albani. Here we are told that he collected some of the martyr's blood from the ground where he had been killed. One version also says that Alban came to Germanus in a dream and revealed the story of his martyrdom to him. Germanus then had this written down in tituli, either in Britain, or as some have argued, back in Auxerre (the Gaulish town of which Germanus was the bishop). Some scholars have argued that Albanus's name was unknown before it was revealed to Germanus, but this is disputed by others.

== Historical Value ==
With regard to the historical reliability of the Vita Germani Nora K. Chadwick quoted Constantius himself : “So many years have passed it is difficult to recover the facts from the silence in which they are buried”. Edward Arthur Thompson emphasised how poorly informed Constantius seems to have been about Germanus's British visit compared to his activities in Gaul and Italy. There are apparent discrepancies between Constantius's account of Germanus's British expeditions and the more reliable near contemporary one of Prosper of Aquitaine. The former relates that Germanus was sent by a council of Gaulish bishops, while Prosper states that he was sent by Pope Celestinus on the advice of the deacon, Palladius. It is possible to reconcile the two on the basis that, say, Palladius was acting at the urging of the Gaulish bishops but some uncertainty remains. Meanwhile, Professor Ian N. Wood has interpreted Constantius' account of Germanus's two British expeditions as in large part 'allegorical' rather than factual.

It is possible, for instance, to suggest that Germanus's 'Allelieua' victory was simply a story made up in Gaul, based on a biblical parallel and no more than a generalised knowledge of the barbarian incursions that Britain was facing at the time. This might well be an excessively skeptical view but we are not in a position to be certain. Likewise the account of Germanus's confrontation with the Pelagians looks arguably too stereotypical to represent any accurate memory of what actually happened. What we can regard as more or less certain is that he visited Britain with the purpose of extinguishing the Pelagian "heresy" there, that the situation there was at least stable enough to make the visit feasible and that bringing the cult of Saint Alban within the fold of orthodoxy was an important part of the strategy by which he hoped to achieve his goal. A further deduction – based on Gildas's description of Saint Alban as Verolamiensem and the presence of that saint's cult centre there by the eighth century at least, according to Bede – might be that he very likely visited Verulamium, the modern Saint Albans.

== Controversy over Germanus's second visit to Britain ==
A particular controversy attaches to Germanus's second visit as described by Constantius, which has been suspected as representing merely a ‘doublet’, of the first: a version that was so badly remembered that it appeared to Constantius or his source as representing an entirely different, 'second', visit. As Norah Chadwick noted, in both visits the object is the same, Germanus is accompanied by another bishop and the incident of the cured boy of the second visit is matched by an incident in which Germanus cures a blind girl in the first. Then there is the fact that on both visits, as Germanus sets out, there are ‘demons’, active against him (in the first they provoke bad weather: in the second we are told they are unable to do this, but instead spread news of his approach). Professor Ian Wood argued for the authenticity of the second visit: he quoted the Vita Genovefa (Life of St Genevieve) but this (perhaps 6th c. work) is one of many sources written after Constantius's Vita Germani which are likely to have been influenced by it. The allocation to Germanus of a different, named, companion - Severus instead of Lupus - remains hard to explain but it might be that it was details like this (originating perhaps with the oral transmission of one version of the tale) that persuaded Constantius that Germanus must actually have made two separate visits.

A recent study by Professor Anthony Barrett has concluded that the complex problems surrounding the dating of the life of Saint Germanus can be most credibly solved on the basis that he made only one visit. Particularly important to his argument are the near-contemporary mentions made by Prosper of Aquitaine. He mentions Germanus's first visit (under the year 429) but not any second one (in later versions of his chronicle up to 455). In another work (his In Collatorem) he describes the exile of the Pelagians which Constantius attributes to the second visit. In fact Ian Wood noted that the harsher treatment of the Pelagians on the second visit as something that differentiated it from the first but it could be that it represents, in fact, a desire to corroborate the success of the first visit while allowing a valid purpose for the second. In any case the point is that Prosper's mention in his In Collatorem was almost certainly written before any second visit could take place. He refers to a lapse of over 20 years since the start of the Pelagian controversy dated to 413 in his chronicle - which would date his In Collatorem to circa 433. Even more decisively he involves Pope Celestine I in this event and since Pope Celestine died in 432 it must have occurred before that time – which Professor Barret argues would not allow time for a second visit. - especially since, according to Constantius, that second visit happened after Germanus's visit to Arles to secure tax relief, something that probably occurred in the mid-430s. That the event described by Prosper was indeed the same one as that attributed by Constantius to the second visit is best judged by comparing the two relevant texts.

   Prosper's In Collatorem (21.1): “With as much vigour he [Pope Celestine] delivered the British isles of the same disease, in that he drove from that retreat of the Ocean certain individuals, enemies of Grace, who had taken possession of the land of their beginnings, and by ordaining a bishop for the Irish, while striving to keep the Roman island Catholic he also made the uncivilized island Christian.”

 Constantius's Vita Germani 26-7: “They sought out the perpetrators and when they had found them they condemned them ... and by common agreement the agents of the depravity were driven from the island and handed over to the priests to be taken off to the Mediterranean area, so that the region could benefit from its deliverance and they could benefit from repentance. This was done with such healthy results that even now in those regions the faith persists unharmed.”

If the second visit of Germanus to Britain is, indeed, a 'doublet' of the first it casts something of a shadow over the reliability of, at least the British episodes of Constantius's Vita – and certainly everything that occurs in the second visit. This must represent a version of the story of Germanus's visit that had changed so much in the telling that it had become unrecognisable as the same as a better recorded version and consequently was assumed by Constantius or his source, to represent another, 'second', visit.

It particularly throws into doubt the somewhat mysterious figure of Elafius, who is somewhat anomalous as representing the only named Briton in the whole of Germanus's account (besides saint Alban). Conceivably he might represent, like the expulsion of the Pelagians, a detail originally connected with the (first and only) visit of 429. However he is connected with an episode (the curing of his son by Germanus) that looks more like allegory than historical fact and which duplicates a similarly allegorical episode (the curing of the blind girl by Germanus) in the "first" visit.

== Interpretation ==
In the Late Antique Era when Constantius was writing the Vita Germani, hagiography, or biographical texts celebrating saints and their lives, were not common. The "cult of saints," or devotion to and veneration of a particular saint, was only in its infancy, making the Vita Germani one of the first of its kind. This had led to considerable debate among historians as to what Constantius' purpose was in writing the Vita. Various historians have suggested that the purpose of the Vita was the edification of its audience, while others have argued that it was meant as a guide for Gallic bishops charged with shepherding congregations in the middle of the collapse of Roman infrastructure, and the incursion of barbarians. Still others have suggested that the Vita was in part an anti-Pelagian text, intended to promote grace over works.

== Editions ==
Original Latin: ed. Levison, Wilhelm, “XI: Vita Germani episcopi Autissiodorensis auctore Constantio”, in: Krusch, B., and W. Levison (eds.), Passiones vitaeque sanctorum aevi Merovingici (IV), MGH Scriptores rerum Merovingicarum 7, Hanover and Leipzig, 1920. 225–283.

English Translation: Hoare, F. R. (1965) "The Western Fathers". New York: Harper Torchbooks

French Translation: ed. & trans. Borius, René, "Constance de Lyon: Vie de Saint Germain d'Auxerre", Sources Chrétiennes 112, Paris: Les Editions du Cerf, 1965.

English translation of sections describing the British visits: Constantius of Lyons, trans. Robert Vermaat. "Vita Sancti Germani". www.vortigernstudies.org.uk. Retrieved 17 November 2014.
