= Passio Albani =

Early medieval hagiography

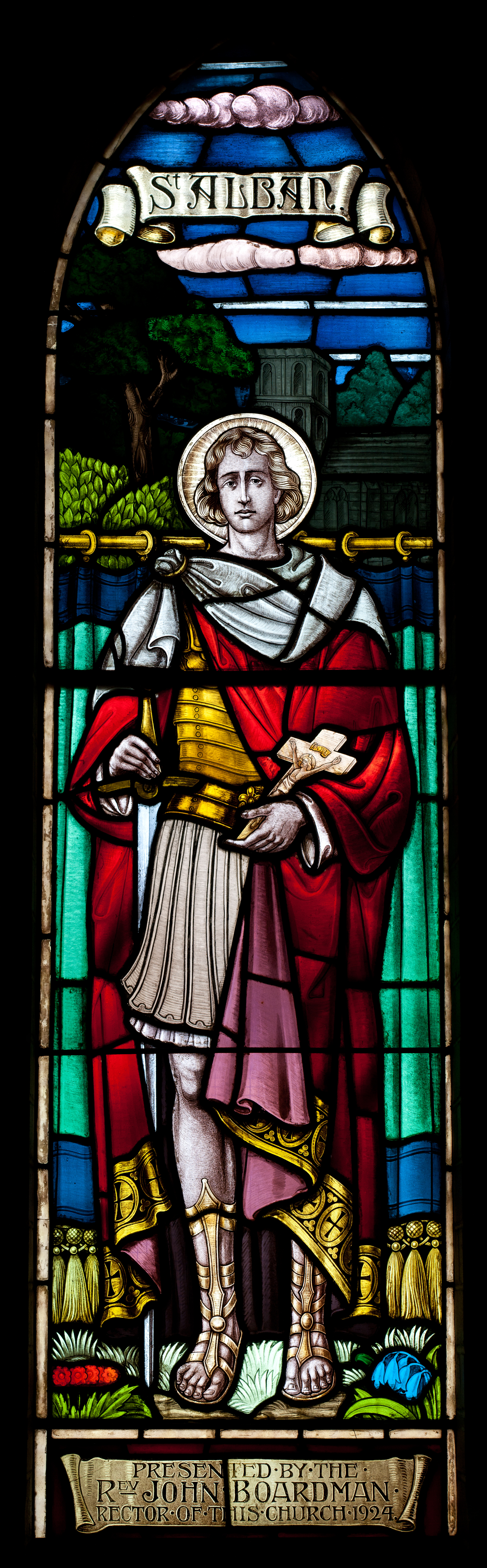
Stained Glass Window Representing Saint Alban

The Passio Albani, or Passion of Saint Alban, is medieval hagiographic text about the martyrdom of Saint Alban, the protomartyr of Roman Britain. The author is anonymous, but the work is thought to have been written in the sixth or fifth century. In the latter case, it may actually have been authored or commissioned by Germanus of Auxerre. It currently survives in three different recensions and six separate manuscripts located throughout Europe, and forms the basis for all subsequent retellings of the Saint Alban martyrdom, from Gildas to Bede.

== Manuscripts and recensions ==
The Passio has survived in six separate manuscripts located throughout Europe. In 1904, The German scholar W. Meyer identified three different recensions of the manuscript, which he named T, P, and E. The T manuscript is located in Turin, the P manuscript in Paris, and the E manuscripts, of which there are four copies, are located at the British Library, Gray's Inn London, Autun France, and Einsiedeln Switzerland.

Meyer identified the T or Turin manuscript as the oldest version of the Passio, and the basis for all other recensions. He believed it was produced at the end of the eighth century at Corbie. Meyer did not believe that the original version of the Passio, the one set down by Germanus on tituli, had survived, and he assumed that the T version was therefore the oldest and most accurate version of the lost original. He postulated that the Turin manuscript was later abridged to form text E, which was then redacted to form the Paris text. This led him to assume that the E version was merely an abridgment of the Turin manuscript, and he edited it only in an abridged form as part of his 1904 survey.

Meyer's view was the standard interpretation for nearly 100 years, which had major implications in how later historians interpreted the historicity of Saint Alban and dated his martyrdom. It wasn't until 2001 that Richard Sharpe examined the E manuscripts and argued that the Turin manuscript is probably not the oldest version after all, and was instead probably composed in the ninth or tenth century at Saint Maur-des-Fossés. Not taking into account Meyer's main argument, Sharpe tried to demonstrate that the E recension is in fact older, and the parent text of all both the T and P texts.

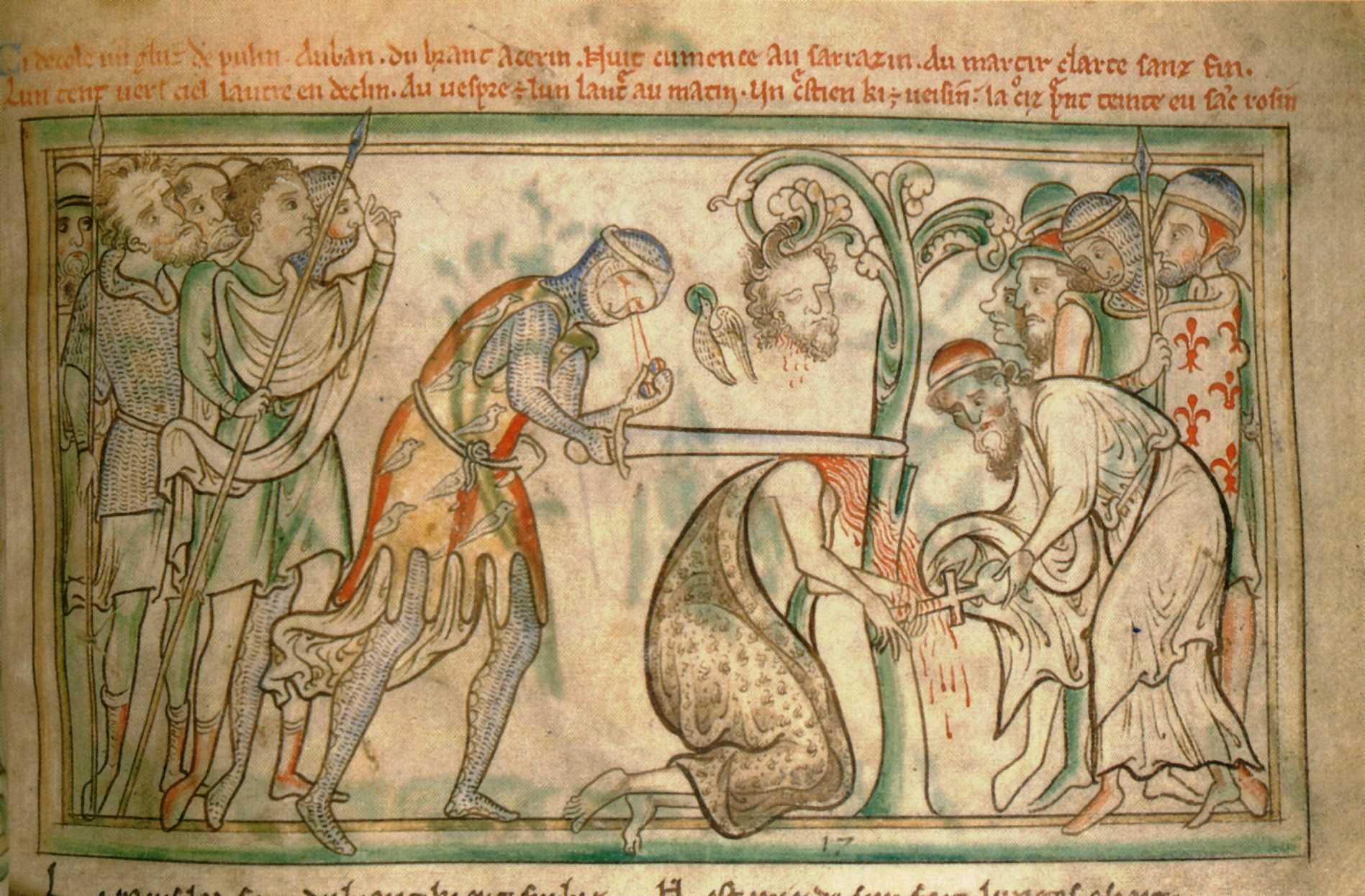
Illustration of Alban's Martyrdom from the 13th-century manuscript "The Life of St. Alban" By Matthew Paris

== Author and date ==
The original author or commissioner of the Passio is thought by historians to be Germanus of Auxerre, though this cannot be proven with certainty, and his name is not recorded as the author of any of the recensions. We know from the Vita Germani and Prosper of Aquitaine that Germanus visited the tomb of Saint Alban in 429. All versions of the Passio, meanwhile, include some details about this visit, after the account of Alban's martyrdom. According to the 'T 'version, Alban came to Germanus in a dream, revealing the details of his martyrdom. When Germanus awoke, he had the tale set down on tituli, possibly engraved onto painted illustrations of the martyrdom. This account set down by Germanus has been thought to be the first copy of the Passio Albani: the E version (minus the few concluding lines about the visit of Germanus to the martyr's tomb), convincingly argued by Professor Sharpe to be not only the shortest and simplest of the recensions but also the oldest This cannot be proved but it is almost certain that this Passio, very likely the source of all our information about Saint Alban, originated within the circle of Germanus at Auxerre. Some historians have argued that this short 'E version/ account of Alban's martyrdom could have been written beneath illustrations of the martyr's passion on the walls of a basilica, actually at Auxerre This was a practice known to happen in 5th- and 6th-century churches, most notably in the collection from Tours known as the Martinellus.

== Interpretation ==
Throughout the 20th century most scholarship related to Saint Alban tended to focus on determining the date and location of Alban's martyrdom, and implicitly assumed that Alban was an authentic historical figure whose cult developed shortly after his martyrdom and continued on from the Roman period into the Anglo-Saxon period and beyond. While the E text of the Passio says only that Alban was martyred tempore persecutionis ," in the time of the persecution," the T text says that Alban was martyred during the reign of Severus, and that Alban was tried by a Caesar. This led some historians to suggest that the martyrdom occurred at the time of the Emperor Severus although other scholars pointed out that the reference to that Emperor looked like an interpolation and that the original version probably only referred to a iudex. This was confirmed by Sharpe's 2001 article which argued for the E version as the most original.

More recently scholars have been more skeptical about the historicity of Saint Alban. In 2009 Professor Ian Wood (followed subsequently by Michael Garcia) suggested that the cult was actually an 'invention' of Saint Germanus of Auxerre, although this has been disputed by, for instance, Professor Nick Higham. Crucial to the debate is the passage from the T text which describes the appearance of saint Alban to Germanus in a dream. This can be interpreted as implying that the identity of the martyr was unknown before it was revealed to Germanus but it can also be interpreted as simply a way of explaining where the acta (or story of the martyrdom) of an already well known figure, came from. In any case what seems clear is that Germanus wanted to identify the cult firmly with continental orthodoxy as a part of his campaign against the Pelagian heresy in Britain.
