= Germanus of Auxerre =

5th-century bishop of Auxerre and saint

Saint Germanus of Auxerre
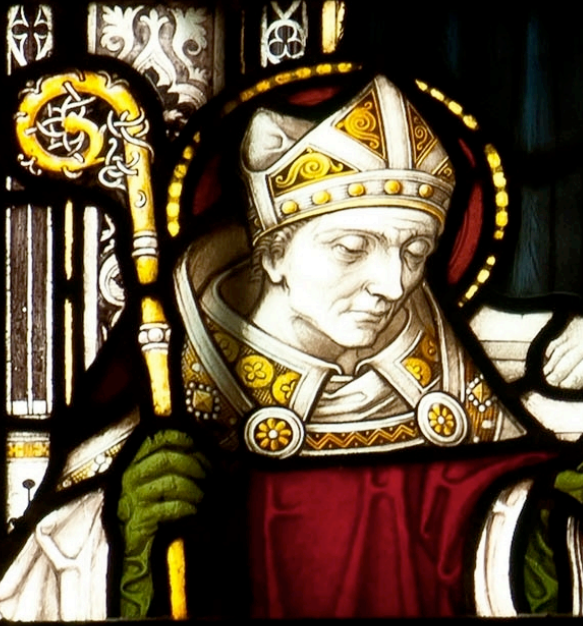

Bishop
- Born: c. 378; Auxerre, Western Roman Empire
- Died: c. 442–448; Ravenna, Western Roman Empire
- Venerated in: Catholic Church, Eastern Orthodox Church, Anglicanism
- Feast: 31 July (universal); 3 August (Wales)

Germanus of Auxerre (Latin: Germanus Autissiodorensis; Welsh: Garmon Sant; French: Saint Germain l'Auxerrois; c. 378 – c. 442–448 AD) was a western Roman clergyman who was bishop of Autissiodorum in Late Antique Gaul. He abandoned a career as a high-ranking government official to devote his formidable energy towards the promotion of the church and the protection of his flock in dangerous times, personally confronting, for instance, the barbarian king Goar. In Britain he is best remembered for his journey to combat Pelagianism in or around 429 AD, and the records of this visit provide valuable information on the state of post-Roman British society. He also played an important part in the establishment and promotion of the Cult of Saint Alban. Alban was said to have revealed the story of his martyrdom to Germanus in a dream or holy vision, and Germanus ordered this to be written down for public display. Germanus is venerated as a saint in both the Catholic Church and Eastern Orthodox Church, which commemorate him on 31 July.

The principal source for the events of his life is the Vita Germani, a hagiography written by Constantius of Lyon around 480, and a brief passage added to the end of the Passio Albani, which may have been written or commissioned by Germanus. Constantius was a friend of Bishop Lupus of Troyes, who accompanied Germanus to Britain.

== Early life ==
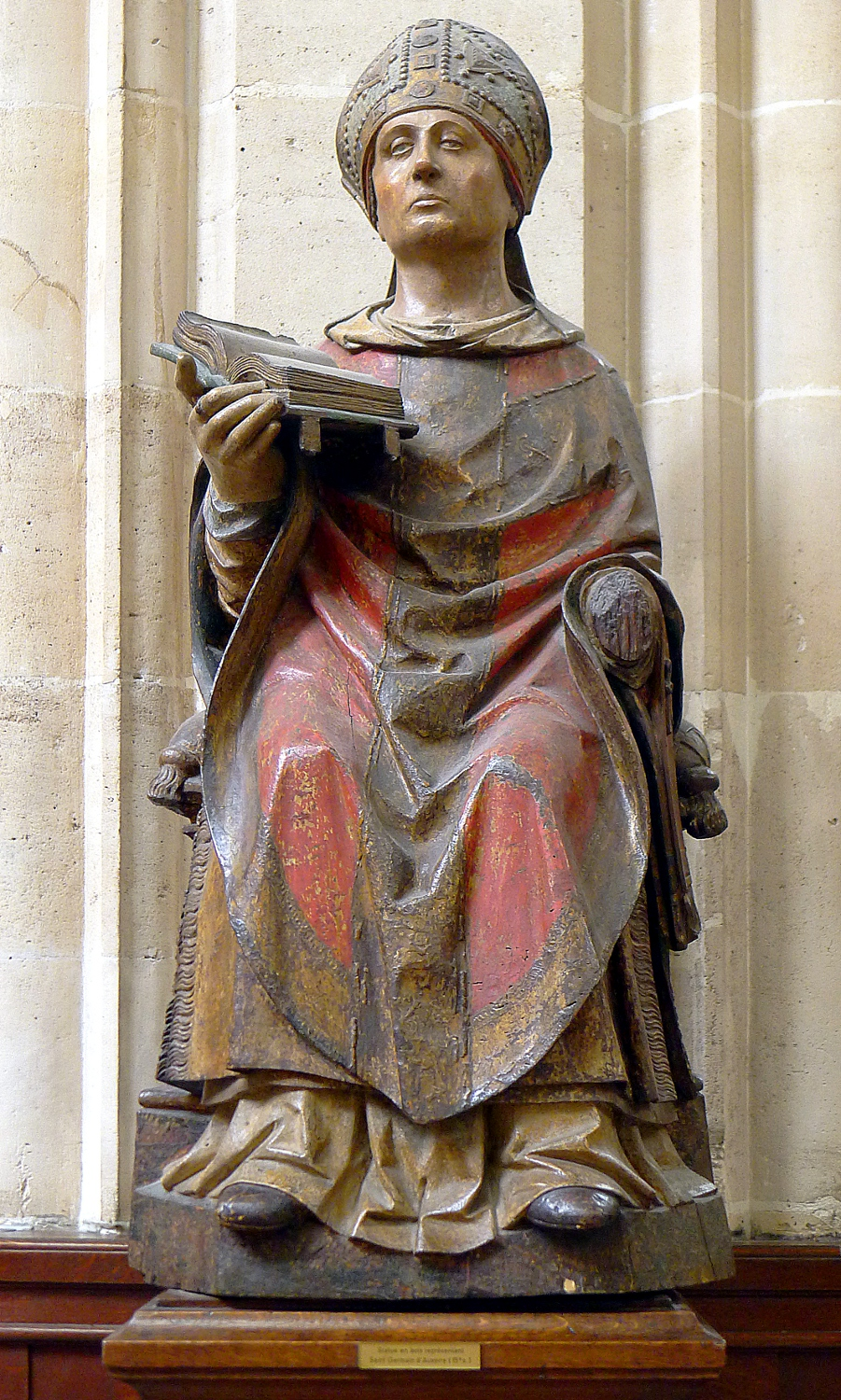
Statue of Saint Germanus of Auxerre.

Germanus was the son of Rusticus and Germanilla, and his family was one of the noblest in Gaul in the latter portion of the fourth century. He received the very best education provided by the distinguished schools of Arles and Lyon, and then went to Rome, where he studied eloquence and civil law. He practiced there before the tribunal of the prefect for some years with great success. His high birth and brilliant talents brought him into contact with the court, and he married Eustachia, a lady highly esteemed in imperial circles. The emperor sent him back to Gaul, appointing him one of the six dukes, entrusted with the government of the Gallic provinces. He resided at Auxerre.

At length he incurred the displeasure of the bishop, Saint Amator, by hanging hunting trophies on a certain tree, which in earlier times had been the scene of pagan worship. Amator remonstrated with him in vain. One day when the duke was absent, the bishop had the tree cut down and the trophies burnt. Fearing the anger of the duke, who wished to kill him, he fled and appealed to the prefect Julius for permission to confer the tonsure on Germain. This being granted, Amator, who felt that his own life was drawing to a close, returned. When the duke came to the church, Amator caused the doors to be barred and gave him the tonsure against his will, telling him to live as one destined to be his successor, and forthwith made him a deacon.

When Amator died after a short time, Germain was unanimously chosen to fill the vacant see, being consecrated 7 July, 418. His education now served him in good stead in the government of the diocese, which he administered with great sagacity. He distributed his goods among the poor, practised great austerities, and built a large monastery dedicated to Saints Cosmas and Damian on the banks of the Yonne, whither he was wont to retire in his spare moments.

== Visit to Britain ==
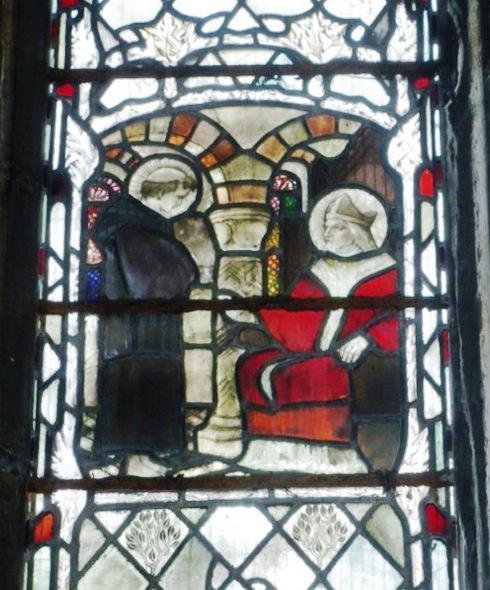
Stained glass window at Gloucester Cathedral depicting St Patrick being taught by Saint Germanus

Around 429, about twenty years after the Roman administration had been ejected from Britain, a Gaulish assembly of bishops chose Germanus and Lupus, Bishop of Troyes, to visit the island. It was alleged that Pelagianism was rife among the British clergy, led by a British bishop's son named Agricola. Germanus went to combat the threat and satisfy the Pope that the British church would not break away from the Augustinian teachings of divine grace. On the way to Britain they passed through Nanterre, where Germanus noticed in the crowd which met them a young girl, whom he bade live as one espoused to Christ, and who later became St. Geneviève of Paris. Germanus and Lupus confronted the British clergy at a public meeting before a huge crowd in Britain. The Pelagians were described as being 'conspicuous for riches, brilliant in dress and surrounded by a fawning multitude'. The bishops debated and, despite having no popular support, Germanus was able to defeat the Pelagians using his superior rhetorical skills.

Constantius also recounts the miraculous healing of the blind daughter of 'a man with tribunician power'. This use of the word tribune may imply the existence of some form of post-Roman government system. However, in Constantius' lifetime tribune had acquired a looser definition, and often was used to indicate any military officer, whether part of the Imperial army or part of a town militia.

Legend has it that Germanus led the native Britons to a victory against Pictish and Saxon raiders, at a mountainous site near a river, of which Mold in North Wales is the traditional location. The enemy approaching, the former general put himself at the head of the Christians. He led them to a wide grassy ledge above the valley where they lay down and could not be seen from the valley. When the Saxon pirates were below them, Germanus cried out thrice "Alleluia", which was immediately echoed by the multitude who stood up and rushed forward. The sound and the sudden appearance of the crowd caused the pirates to panic and flee. They were immediately pursued and slaughtered, leaving behind their baggage and booty.

== Germanus and the Cult of Saint Alban ==
Immediately after the debate with the Pelagians, Germanus gave thanks for his victory at the grave of Saint Alban, which was likely in some sort of tomb or basilica. Some translators use the word "shrine"; this word, which is not the original Latin, would have suggested that the cult of Saint Alban had been established before Germanus' visit to Britain. That night, Germanus claimed that Saint Alban came to him in a dream, revealing the details of his martyrdom. Some scholars have even interpreted the relevant passage in a postscript to the Passio Albani as implying the saint's name was unknown before it was revealed to Germanus but other scholars have disputed this. When Germanus awoke, he had the account written down in tituli, possibly to be engraved on the walls or illustrated placards at a church site, either in Britain, or in Auxerre. It has been suggested that this account formed the basis of the Passio Albani, the foundational text of all information about Saint Alban: while this is fundamentally unprovable the evidence is strong that the Passio originated within the circle of Germanus at Auxerre. Germanus then deposited some of the bones of continental saints in the basilica, and took a sample of the earth at the site of Alban's martyrdom, which still bore the marks of the martyr's blood. Some have advanced arguments for the antiquity of the cult of Saint Alban (for example Martin Biddle), while others suggest it was a rather artificial creation from the final years of Roman Britain, or soon after. Some have, in fact, concluded that Germanus, himself, was responsible for the creation as well as the promotion of the cult although this has been disputed by others.

== Later life ==
Germanus may have made a second visit to Britain in the mid 430s or mid 440s, though this is contested by some scholars who suggest it may be a 'doublet' or variant version of the visit that has been mistaken as describing a different visit and erroneously included as such by Constantius, according to whom Germanus was joined by Severus, Bishop of Trier and met Elafius, "one of the leading men of the country". Germanus is said to have cured Elafius' enfeebled son by a miracle that served to persuade the population that Catholicism rather than Pelagianism was the true faith.

According to a legend recorded in the Historia Brittonum of circa 829 it is during this second visit, around 447, that Germanus is said to have condemned Guorthigern, identified with the 'Vortigern' of Welsh tradition, for incest and other crimes. Vortigern ordered his daughter to bring her child to Germanus and name the bishop as its father. The scheme having failed, Vortigern was cursed by Germanus and the council of Britons, and fled into Wales followed by Germanus and the clergy. They pursued him to a castle on the river Teifi, where they fasted and prayed for three days and three nights. Finally, fire fell from heaven consuming the castle, the guilty king, and his company. While the story appears to have no historical basis, it does indicate in what reverence Germanus was held in the Church in that part of the land.

He died in Ravenna while petitioning the Roman government for leniency for the citizens of Armorica, against Aëtius had dispatched the Alans on a punitive expedition. Germanus had famously confronted Goar, the king of the Alans, so Constantius's Life relates.

Based on the scanty evidence, some scholars have argued that his death should be dated to 442 or 448, and others that it should be dated to c. 437.

== Cult ==
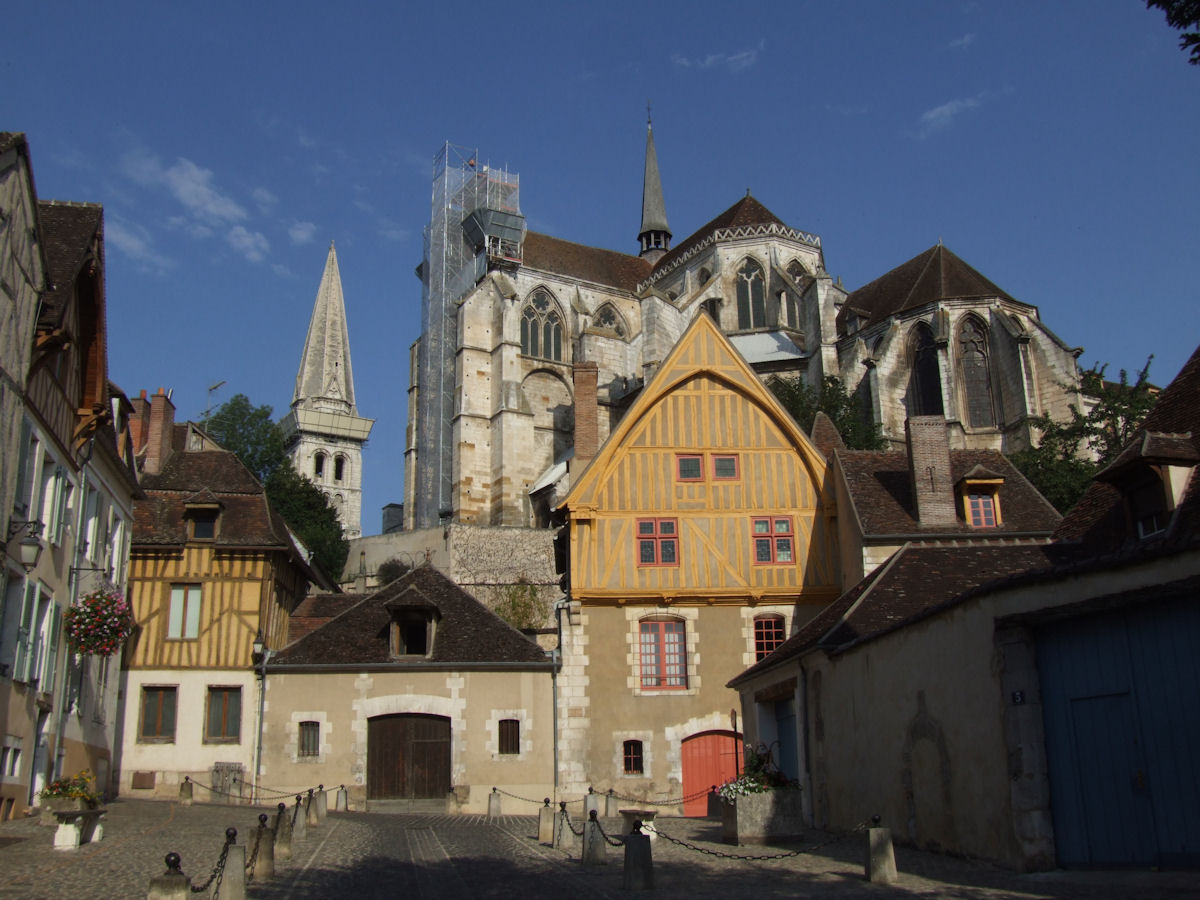
A view of Auxerre's old town with the Abbey of Saint Germanus in the background

Saint Germanus' tomb continues to be venerated in the church of the Abbey of Saint-Germain d'Auxerre, which although now part of municipal museum remains open for worship at stated times. There is a tradition of a panegyric on the Sunday nearest to or preceding his festival in July.

The cult of Saint Germanus of Auxerre spread in northern France, hence the church Saint-Germain l'Auxerrois facing the Louvre in Paris. His cult is clearly distinguished from that of the homonymous Saint Germanus of Paris. He is associated with the church at Charonne in the east of Paris and the cult of Saint Genevieve (Genoveva) in Nanterre to the west of the city, both situated on the late Roman road network. His journey to Britain is commemorated in his dedications at Siouville and at Saint-Germain-les-Vaux in the Cotentin (Manche).

In the 2004 edition of the Roman Martyrology, Germanus is listed under July 31. He is described as "passing at Ravenna, a bishop who defended Britain against the Pelagian heresy and travelled to make peace for Armorica".

=== In Great Britain ===
The former priory church at St Germans in Cornwall bears his name and was in late Saxon times the seat of a bishop. A few other churches in England are dedicated to the saint, including St Germain's Church, Edgbaston, in Birmingham, St Germanus' Church, Faulkbourne, in Essex and St Germanus' Church, Rame, in Cornwall, as well as the church at Germansweek in Devon. The name of the civil parish of Wiggenhall St Germans in Norfolk reflects a church dedication.

St Germain is the patron Saint of Selby Abbey, North Yorkshire, and of the parish church of St Germain in Winestead.

In Wales, Germanus is remembered as an early influence on the Celtic Church. In the current Roman Catholic liturgical calendar for Wales, he is commemorated on August 3, July 31 being designated for Ignatius of Loyola. In Adamsdown, Cardiff, St German's Church is a Church in Wales (Anglican) parish church by Bodley, opened in 1884.

Germanus is traditionally credited with the establishment of the Diocese of Sodor and Man on the Isle of Man, though this may have been a different man of a similar name. In the medieval tradition Germanus was frequently conflated with the Welsh Saint Garmon, who is commemorated in several North Wales placenames and church dedications, including Capel Garmon, Llanarmon, Llanarmon Dyffryn Ceiriog, Llanarmon Mynydd Mawr, Llanarmon-yn-Iâl, Llanfechain and Castle Caereinion. However, Sabine Baring-Gould and Fisher argued that Saint Garmon is a different Saint Germanus, who was born in Armorica (northern France) c. 410, visited Saint Patrick in Ireland in about 440, visited Britain in about 462, then returned to Ireland and was appointed Bishop of Man in 466, and died on the Isle of Man c. 474.

== Fictional portrayals of Germanus ==
- Hilaire Belloc refers to Germanus in his humorous poem, "The Pelagian Drinking Song" in The four men / a farrago (1912):

And then with his stout Episcopal staff
So thoroughly whacked and banged
The heretics all, both short and tall,
They rather had been hanged.

- Germanus's visit to Britain is the subject of the Welsh language radio play Buchedd Garmon (1936) by Saunders Lewis.
- Germanus appears many times in Jack Whyte series of novels 'A Dream of Eagles' (1992–2005) and the series "The Golden Eagle" (2005) .
- Germanus appears in the TV movie St. Patrick: The Irish Legend (2000) where he helps Patrick achieve his mission to convert the Irish.
- In Valerio Massimo Manfredi's 2002 novel The Last Legion and in the 2007 film based on the novel, Germanus dies in Britain after his arrival on the island to lead the Romans and Britons against the barbarian Picts. In the film, before he dies the Bishop recites his last words as a prophecy and founds the last legion of Britain, entrusting them with their standard: a silver dragon with a purple tail.
- Germanus appears in the 2004 film King Arthur, although his second and final mission to Britain took place twenty years before the year in which the movie is set. He is portrayed by Italian actor Ivano Marescotti.
- St Germain is one of the patron saints of Selby Abbey in North Yorkshire. Monk Benedict in Auxerre had a vision of the Saint. He stole St Germain's finger from the monastery, travelled to England and founded Selby Abbey in 1069. The finger disappeared at the Reformation but the Abbey church survives as a thriving parish church.
