= Lupus of Troyes =

Christian bishop in Gaul (c. 383–c. 478)

Saint Lupus of Troyes
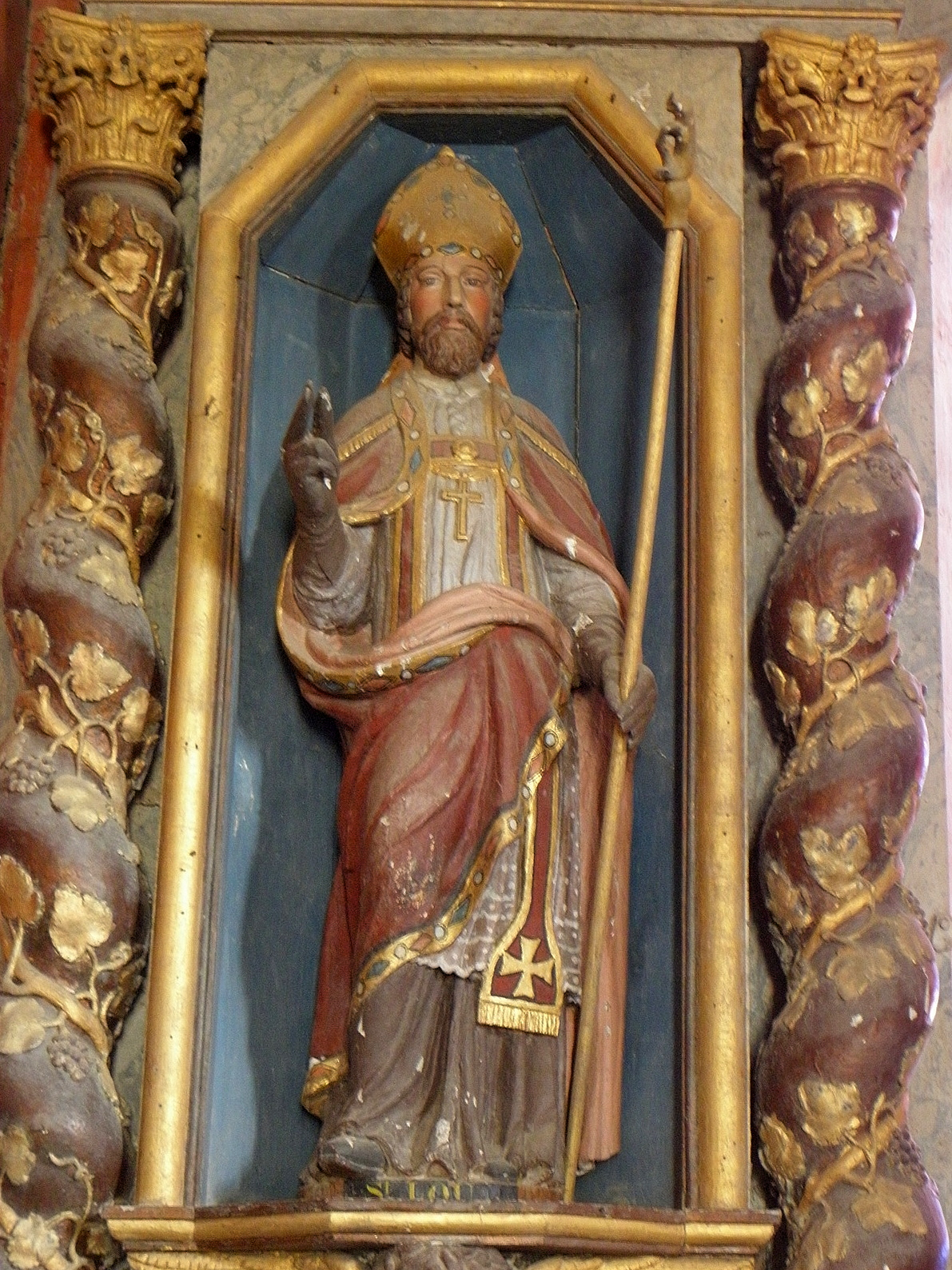
- Le Lou-du-Lac Église
- Born: c. 383; Toul, Western Roman Empire
- Died: c. 479; Troyes
- Venerated in: Eastern Orthodox Church; Roman Catholic Church
- Feast: July 29
- Attributes: depicted with a diamond falling from heaven as he celebrates Mass; shown holding a chalice with a diamond in it or at the altar, giving a diamond to a king

Lupus (French: Loup, Leu; Welsh: Bleiddian; c. 383 – c. 478 AD) was an early bishop of Troyes. Around 426, the bishops in Britain requested assistance from the bishops of Gaul in dealing with Pelagianism. Germanus of Auxerre and Lupus were sent.

== Life ==
Born at Toul, he was the son of a wealthy nobleman, Epirocus of Toul. He has been called the brother of Vincent of Lérins. Having lost his parents when he was an infant, Lupus was brought up by his uncle Alistocus. He was brother-in-law to Hilary of Arles, as he had married one of Hilary's sisters, Pimeniola. He held a number of estates in Maxima Sequanorum, and worked as a lawyer. After six years of marriage, he and his wife parted by mutual agreement.

Lupus sold his estate and gave the money to the poor. He entered Lérins Abbey, a community led by Honoratus, where he stayed about a year. In 427 Honoratus was named Bishop of Arles, and Hilary accompanied him to his new see. Lupus retired to Macon where he came to the attention of Germanus of Auxerre, who appointed him bishop of Troyes. He was reluctant to assume this office and at first declined, but eventually relented.

In the autumn of 429, the Council of Arles, at the request of the bishops in Britain, sent Lupus and Germanus of Auxerre to combat Pelagianism. As such, Lupus is remembered in Wales as Bleiddian and appears in early Welsh Literature such as the Bonedd y Saint. He is venerated at Llanblethian in the Vale of Glamorgan. They returned to Gaul just after Easter in the spring of 430. Lupus was bishop for fifty-two years and died at Troyes in 479.

Sidonius Apollinaris called him "The father of fathers and bishop of bishops, the chief of the Gallican prelates, the rule of manners, the pillar of truth, the friend of God, and the intercessor to him for men." He was a friend of Bishop Euphronius of Autun.

== Lupus and Attila ==
Lupus was credited with saving Troyes from the Huns under Attila, in 451. According to the accounts, after praying for many days, Lupus, dressed in full episcopal regalia, went to meet Attila at the head of a procession of the clergy. Attila was allegedly so impressed with Lupus that he spared the city. Attila went on to lose the Battle of Châlons. Lupus ran into trouble when Attila asked the bishop to accompany him and his army after Châlons; Attila believed that Lupus's presence would spare his army from extermination. However, Lupus was accused by the Romans of helping the Huns escape. Lupus was forced to leave Troyes, and he became a hermit in the mountains. But "many scholars doubt the veracity of the account of the Attila incident." A similar story is told of Genevieve. Donald Attwater writes that the tale of Lupus and Attila is hagiographical rather than historical. However, the historical kernel it might contain is that Troyes was spared being sacked by Attila's army and that its inhabitants considered this a miraculous deliverance.
