= Constantius of Lyon =

French Catholic cleric

Constantius of Lyon (fl. c. AD 480) was a cleric from what is now the Auvergne in modern-day France, who wrote the Vita Germani, or Life of Germanus, a hagiography of Germanus of Auxerre. The hagiography was written some time during the second half of the fifth century, and was commissioned by Patiens, bishop of Lyon.

Constantius was a friend of Bishop Lupus of Troyes and Sidonius Apollinaris, with whom he corresponded, and several letters from them are included in his published letter-collection.
