= Astronomy =

Scientific study of celestial objects

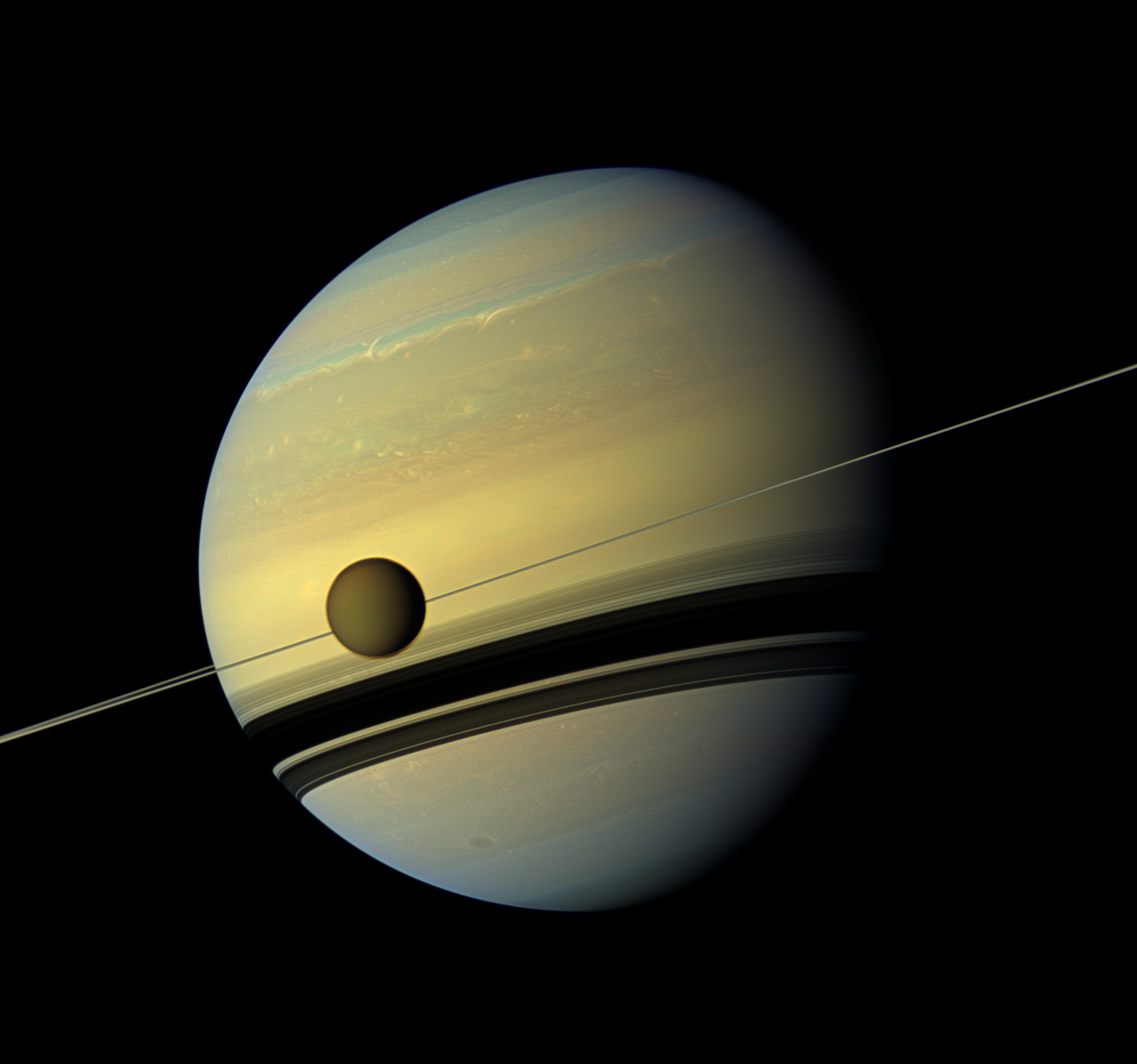
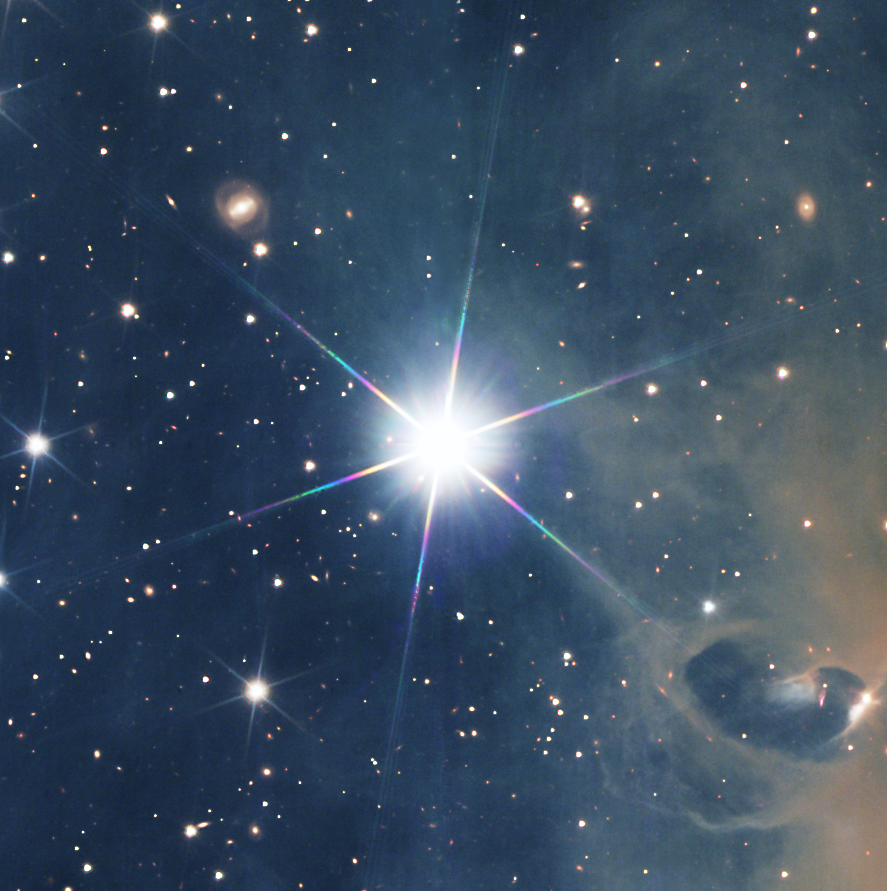
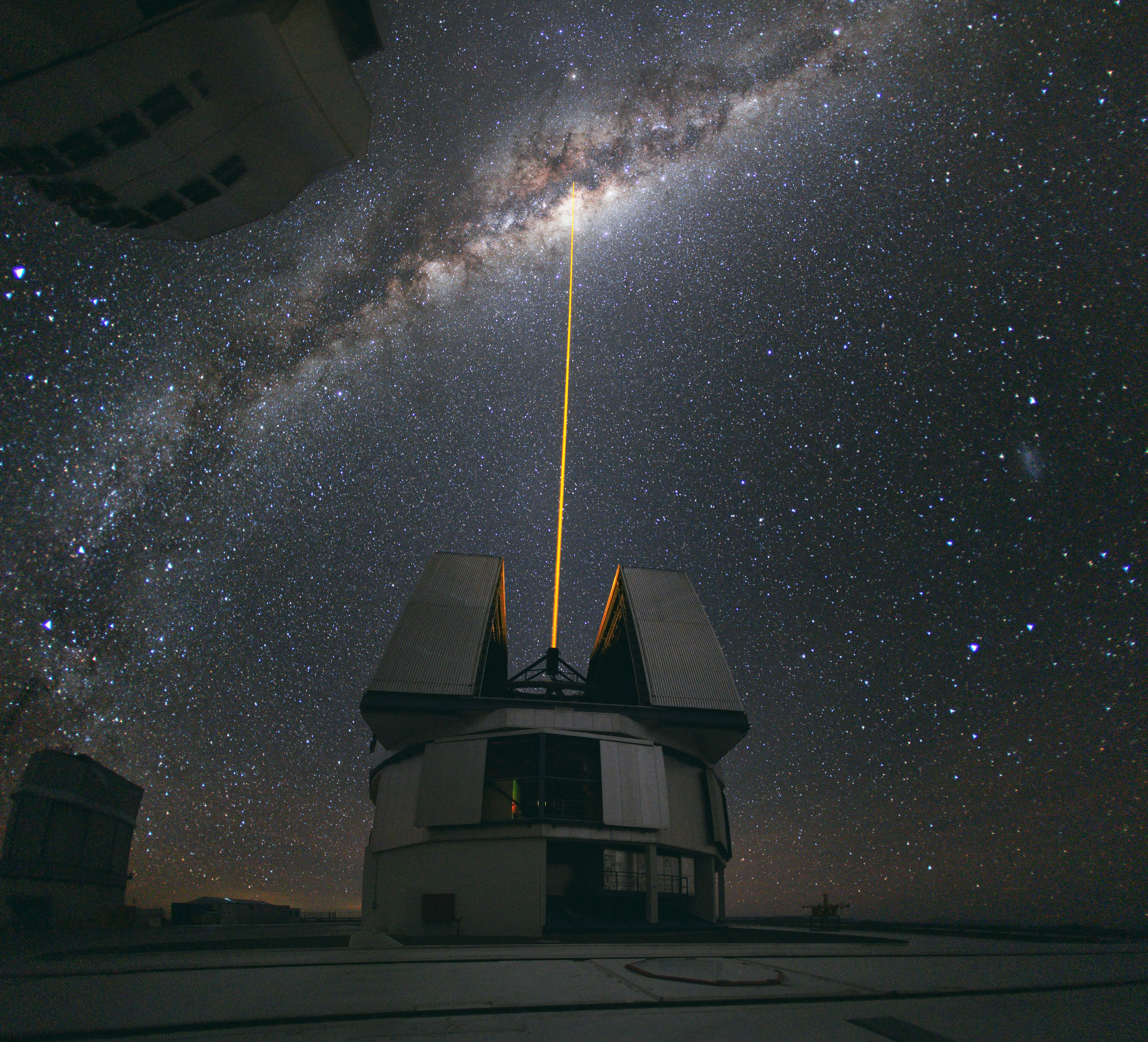
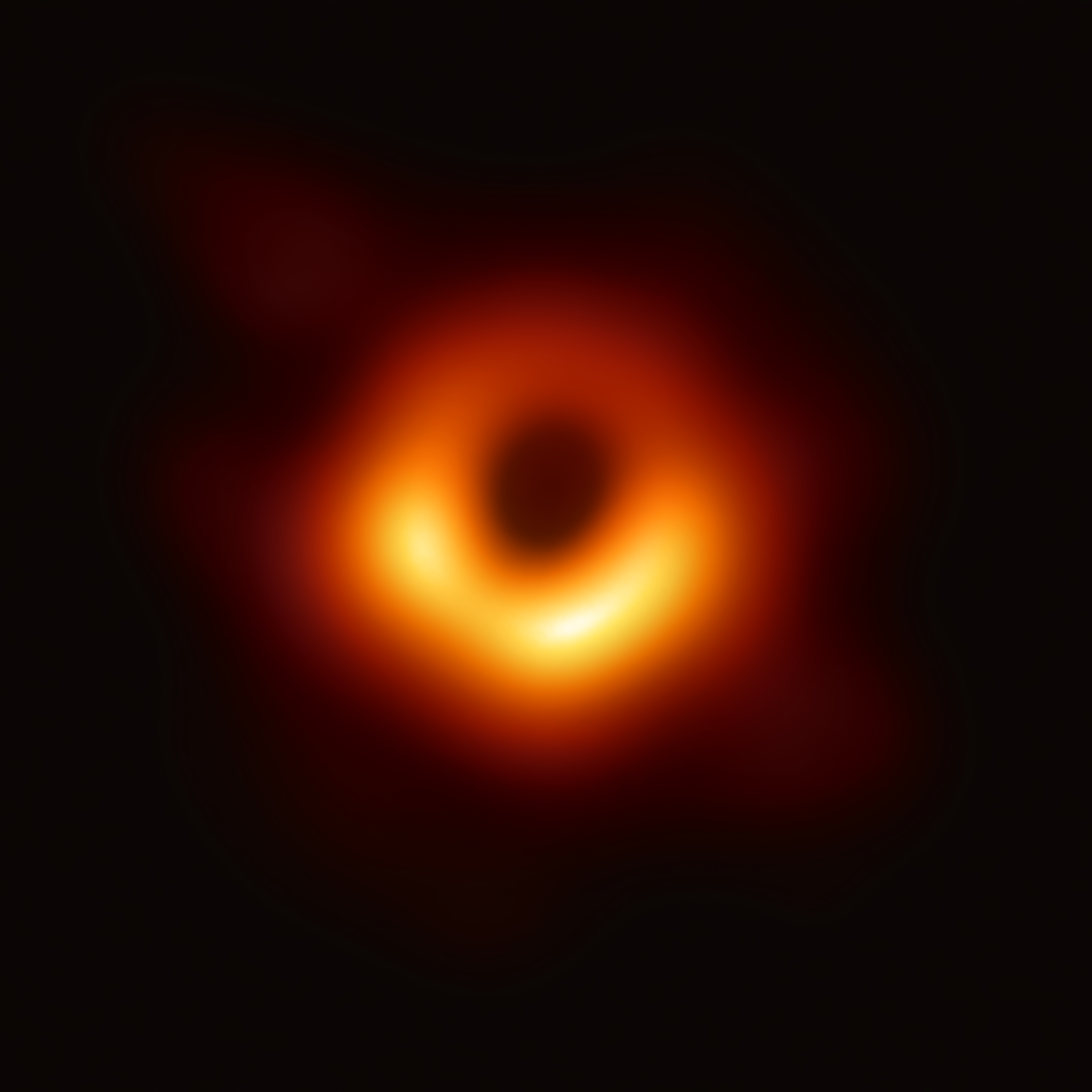
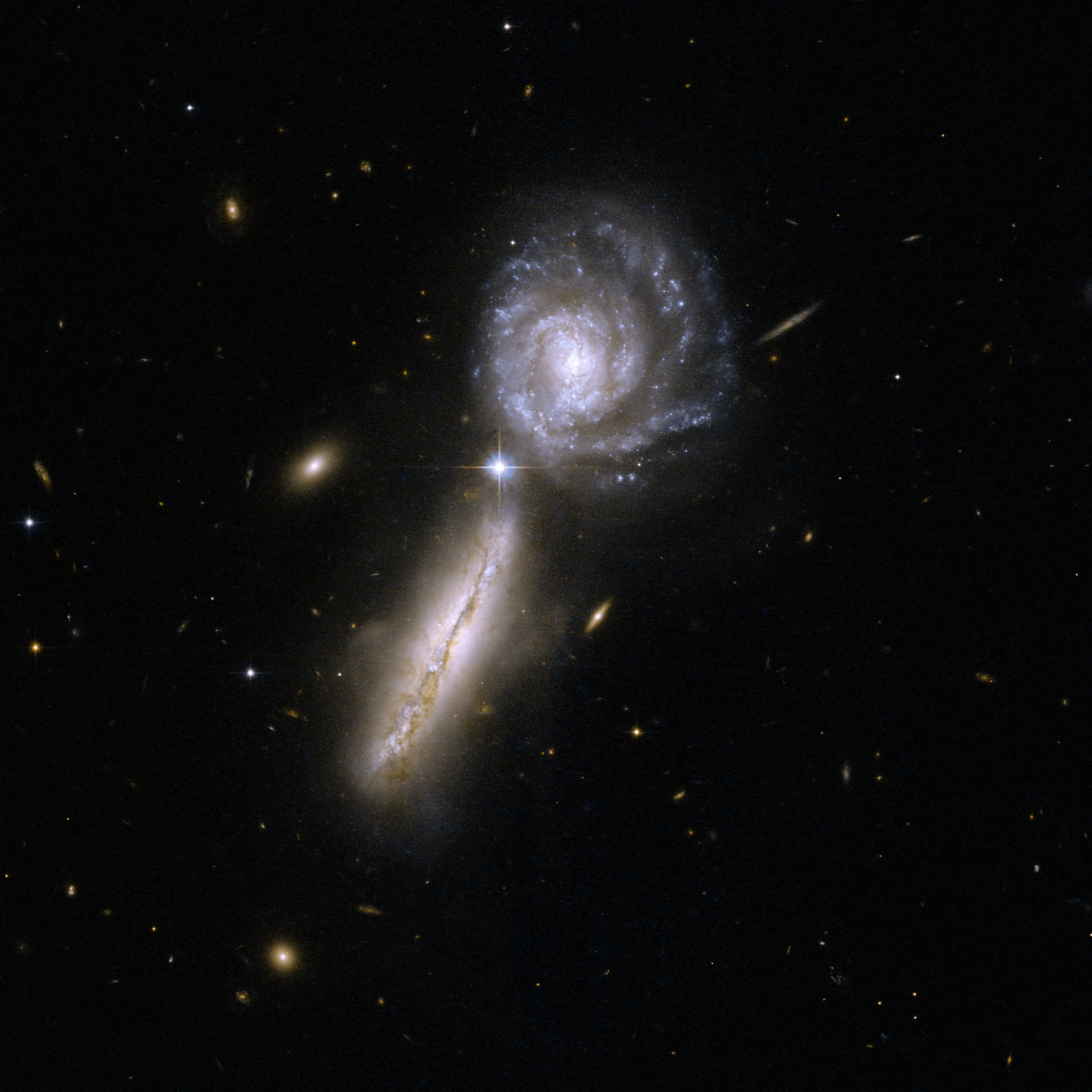
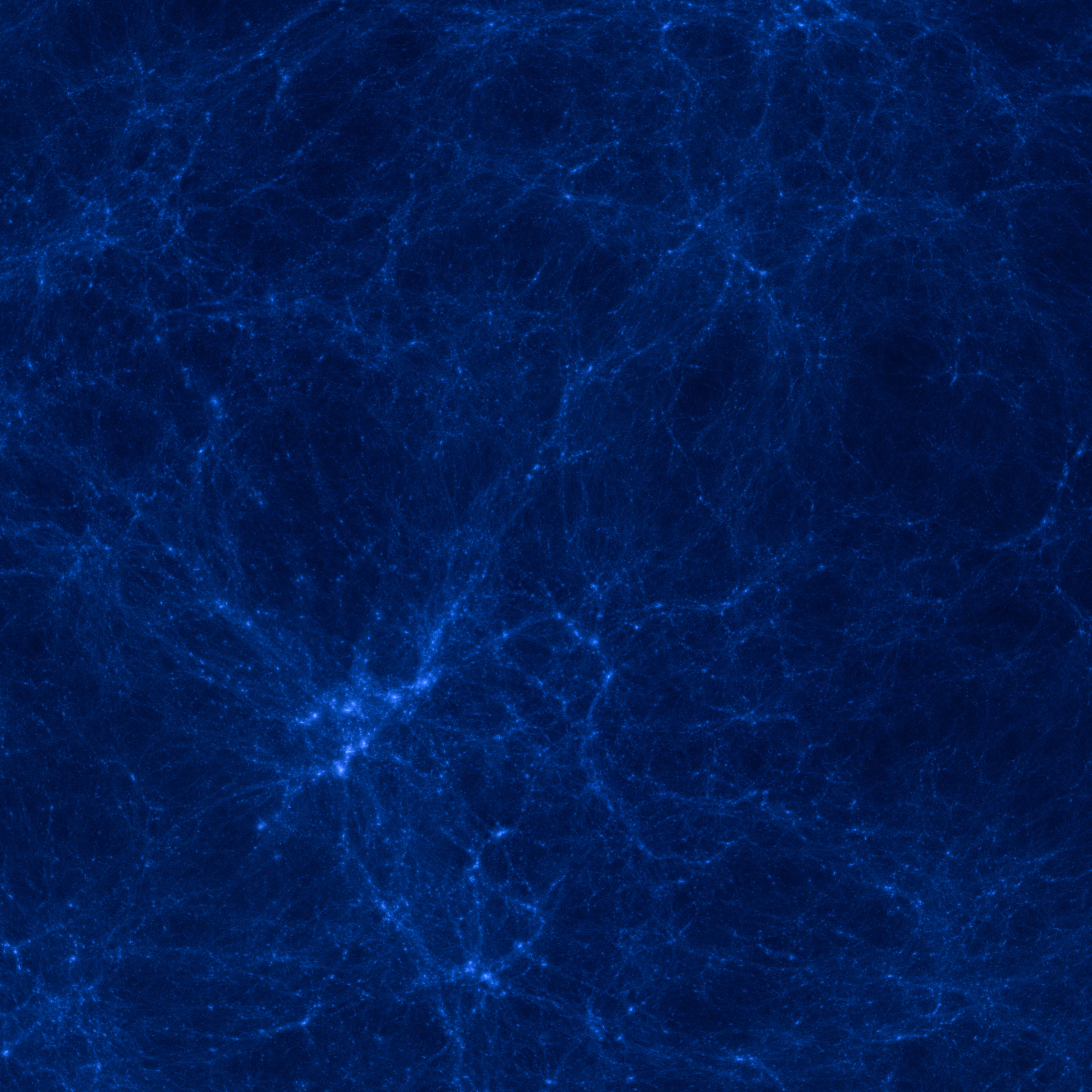
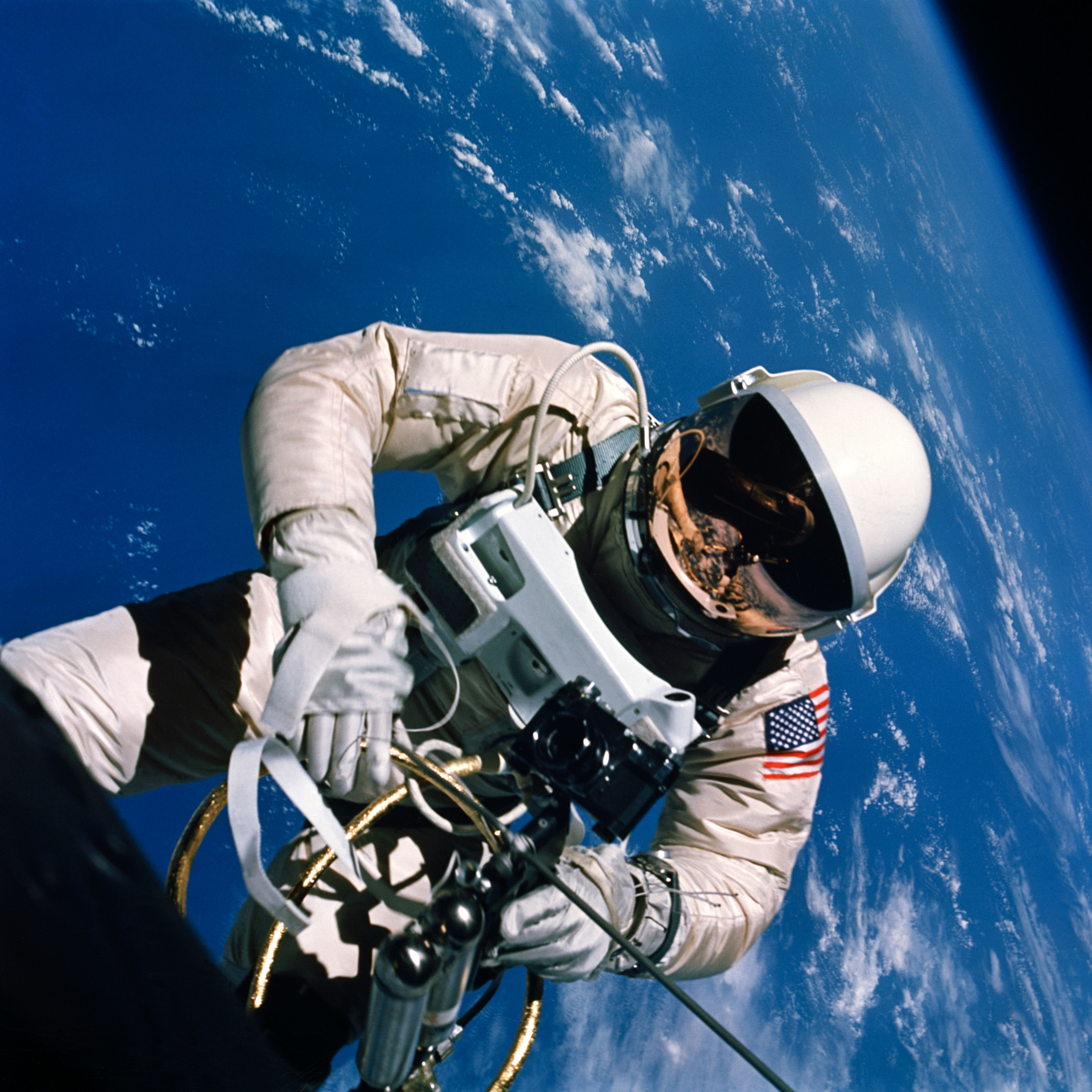
Nine images relating to different branches of astronomy. (Note: Below is the list of the images present in the collage and their respective astronomy discipline(s), rightwards across the rows: Planetary science Titan passing in front of Saturn in a natural‑colour mosaic from the Cassini spacecraft, showing atmospheric seasonal changes and the shadow of Saturn’s rings. Stellar astronomy the star BD−08 1203 imaged by the Euclid Space Telescope, part of a deep stellar field used for photometric and astrometric studies. Solar physics a photograph of the 1999 total solar eclipse in France, revealing the solar corona during totality. Observational astronomy & Galactic astronomy the VLT at Paranal Observatory projecting a laser guide star into the mesosphere to enable adaptive optics observations of the Galactic Center. Astrophysics the first direct image of the supermassive black hole M87* from the Event Horizon Telescope, showing the photon ring surrounding its shadow. Extragalactic astronomy interacting spiral galaxies UGC 9618 (also known as VV 340 / Arp 302), imaged by the Hubble Space Telescope, illustrating early‑stage galactic merging. Cosmology & Computational astronomy a frame from the CLUES project, depicting the large‑scale cosmic web of filaments, clusters and voids in the Universe. Astrochemistry the Rho Ophiuchi cloud complex imaged by the JWST (NIRCam), showing jets from young stars, molecular hydrogen emission, and polycyclic aromatic hydrocarbons. Astrobiology an EVA by astronaut Edward H. White II during Gemini 4, illustrating human presence in the outermost region of Earth’s biosphere and the study of life in space environments. These are just some of the many branches of astronomy. Others include (but are not limited to): high‑energy astrophysics, astroparticle physics, planetary geology, helioseismology, neutrino astronomy, astrostatistics and more. Also, there is often much overlap between the fields of astronomy, making the examples listed mostly conceptual and meant for conveying the focus of each mentioned.)

Astronomy is a natural science that studies celestial objects and the phenomena that occur in the cosmos. It uses mathematics, physics, and chemistry to explain their origin and their overall evolution. Objects of interest include planets, moons, stars, nebulae, galaxies, meteoroids, asteroids, and comets. Relevant phenomena include supernova explosions, gamma ray bursts, quasars, blazars, pulsars, and cosmic microwave background radiation. More generally, astronomy studies everything that originates beyond Earth's atmosphere. Cosmology is the branch of astronomy that studies the universe as a whole.

Astronomy is one of the oldest natural sciences. The early civilizations in recorded history made methodical observations of the night sky. These include the Egyptians, Babylonians, Greeks, Indians, Chinese, Maya, and many ancient indigenous peoples of the Americas. In the past, astronomy included disciplines as diverse as astrometry, celestial navigation, observational astronomy, and the making of calendars.

Astronomy is one of the few sciences in which amateurs play an active role. This is especially true for the discovery and observation of transient events. Amateur astronomers have helped with many important discoveries, such as finding new comets.

== Etymology ==
Astronomy (from the Greek ἀστρονομία from ἄστρον astron, "star" and -νομία -nomia from νόμος nomos, "law" or "rule") means study of celestial objects. Astronomy should not be confused with astrology, the belief system which claims that human affairs are correlated with the positions of celestial objects. The two fields share a common origin but became distinct, astronomy being supported by physics while astrology is not.

=== Use of terms "astronomy" and "astrophysics" ===
"Astronomy" and "astrophysics" are broadly synonymous in modern usage. In dictionary definitions, "astronomy" is "the study of objects and matter outside the Earth's atmosphere and of their physical and chemical properties", while "astrophysics" is the branch of astronomy dealing with "the behavior, physical properties, and dynamic processes of celestial objects and phenomena". Sometimes, as in the introduction of the introductory textbook The Physical Universe by Frank Shu, "astronomy" means the qualitative study of the subject, whereas "astrophysics" is the physics-oriented version of the subject. Some fields, such as astrometry, are in this sense purely astronomy rather than also astrophysics. Research departments may use "astronomy" and "astrophysics" according to whether the department is historically affiliated with a physics department, and many professional astronomers have physics rather than astronomy degrees. Thus, in modern use, the two terms are often used interchangeably.

== History ==
=== Pre-historic ===
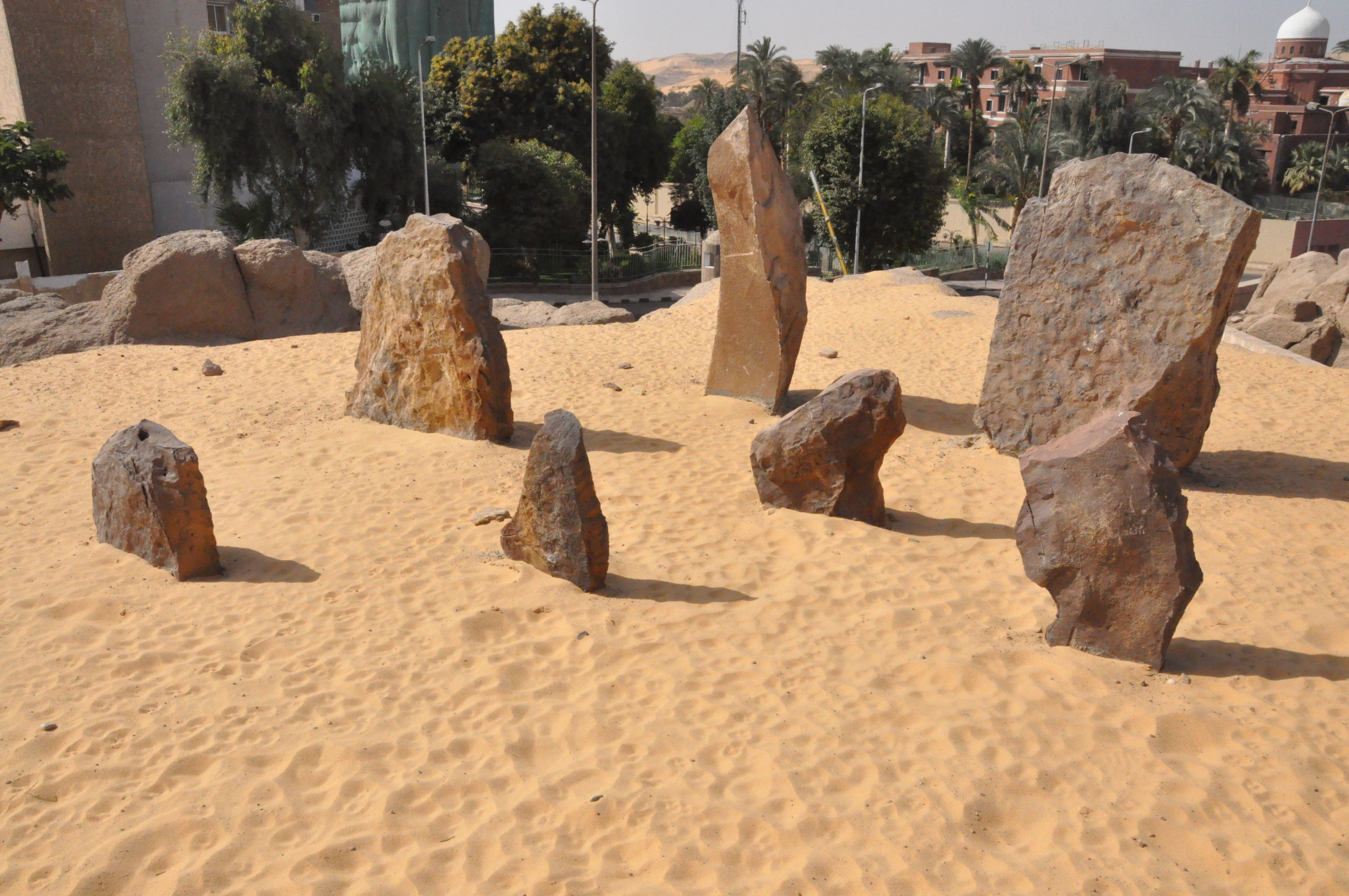
Megaliths from Nabta Playa, constructed by Neolithic populations, located in Aswan, Upper Egypt.

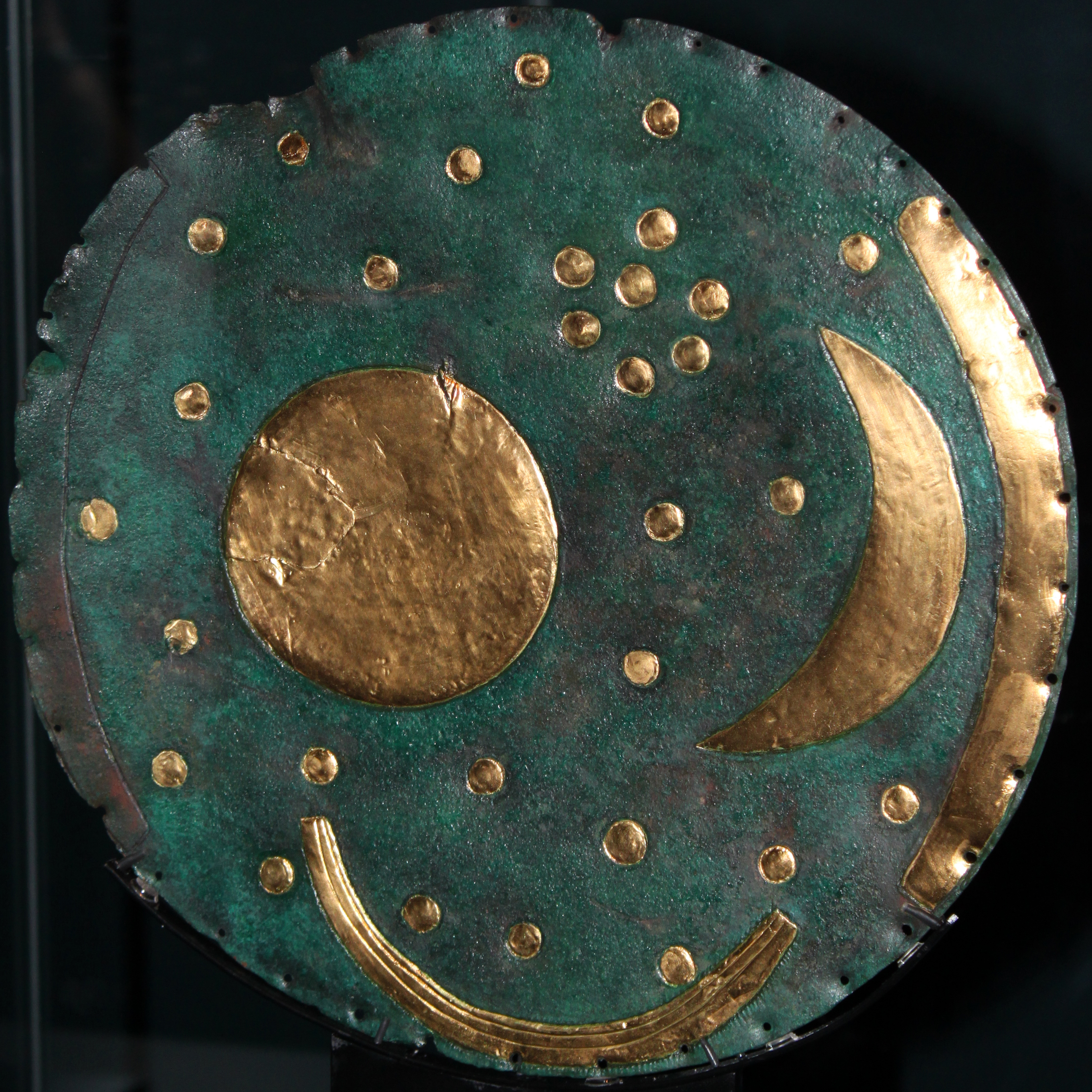
The Nebra sky disc found on Mittenberg hill in Germany and dated to c. 1800–1600 BCE.

The initial development of astronomy was driven by practical needs like agricultural calendars. Before recorded history archeological sites such as Stonehenge provide evidence of ancient interest in astronomical observations. Evidence also comes from artefacts such as the Nebra sky disc inlaid with symbols interpreted as a sun, moon, and stars including a cluster of seven stars. Megalithic structures located in Nabta Playa, Upper Egypt featured astronomical calendar arrangements in alignment with the heliacal rising of Sirius and supported calibration the yearly calendar for the annual Nile flood.

=== Classical ===
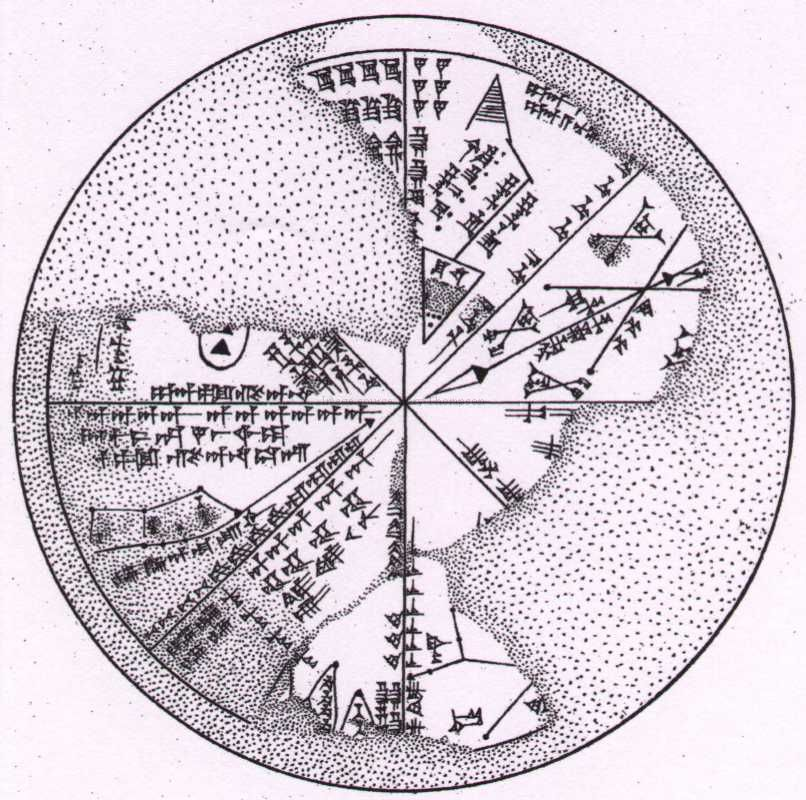
A Babylonian planisphere (7th century BCE) was an early astronomical instrument. Its use of sexagesimals (e.g. 12, 24, 60, 360) is still being used today through having been broadly adopted for timekeeping and astrometry.

Civilizations such as Egypt, Mesopotamia, Greece, India, China independently but with cross-cultural influences created astronomical observatories and developed ideas on the nature of the Universe, along with calendars and astronomical instruments. A key early development was the beginning of mathematical and scientific astronomy among the Babylonians, laying the foundations for astronomical traditions in other civilizations. The Babylonians discovered that lunar eclipses recurred in the saros cycle of 223 synodic months.

Following the Babylonians, significant advances were made in ancient Greece and the Hellenistic world. Greek astronomy sought a rational, physical explanation for celestial phenomena. In the 4th century BC, Heracleides Ponticus was the first to proposed that the Earth rotates on its own axis. In the 3rd century BC, Aristarchus of Samos estimated the size and distance of the Moon and Sun, and he proposed a model of the Solar System where the Earth and planets rotated around the Sun, now called the heliocentric model. In the 2nd century BC, Hipparchus calculated the size and distance of the Moon and invented the earliest known astronomical devices such as the astrolabe. He also observed the small drift in the positions of the equinoxes and solstices with respect to the fixed stars that we now know is caused by precession. Hipparchus also created a catalog of 1020 stars, and most of the constellations of the northern hemisphere derive from Greek astronomy. The Antikythera mechanism (c. 150–80 BC) was an early analog computer designed to calculate the location of the Sun, Moon, and planets for a given date. Technological artifacts of similar complexity did not reappear until the 14th century, when mechanical astronomical clocks appeared in Europe.

=== Post-classical ===
After the classical Greek era, astronomy was dominated by the geocentric model of the Universe, or the Ptolemaic system, named after Claudius Ptolemy. His 13-volume astronomy work, named the Almagest in its Arabic translation, became the primary reference for over a thousand years. In this system, the Earth was believed to be the center of the Universe with the Sun, the Moon and the stars rotating around it. While the system would eventually be discredited, it gave the most accurate predictions for the positions of astronomical bodies available at that time.

With the arrival of Hellenistic astronomy in India through trade and cultural contacts, Indian astronomy entered a new phase during the early centuries CE. Earlier indigenous traditions, such as those recorded in the Vedāṅga Jyotiṣa, provided calendrical foundations, while Greek astronomical models were later integrated by scholars including Āryabhaṭa, Varāhamihira, and Brahmagupta. Āryabhaṭa notably improved methods for calculating planetary motions and eclipses. In the later medieval period, the Kerala school contributed to astronomy through refined observational practices and more accurate planetary and eclipse calculations.

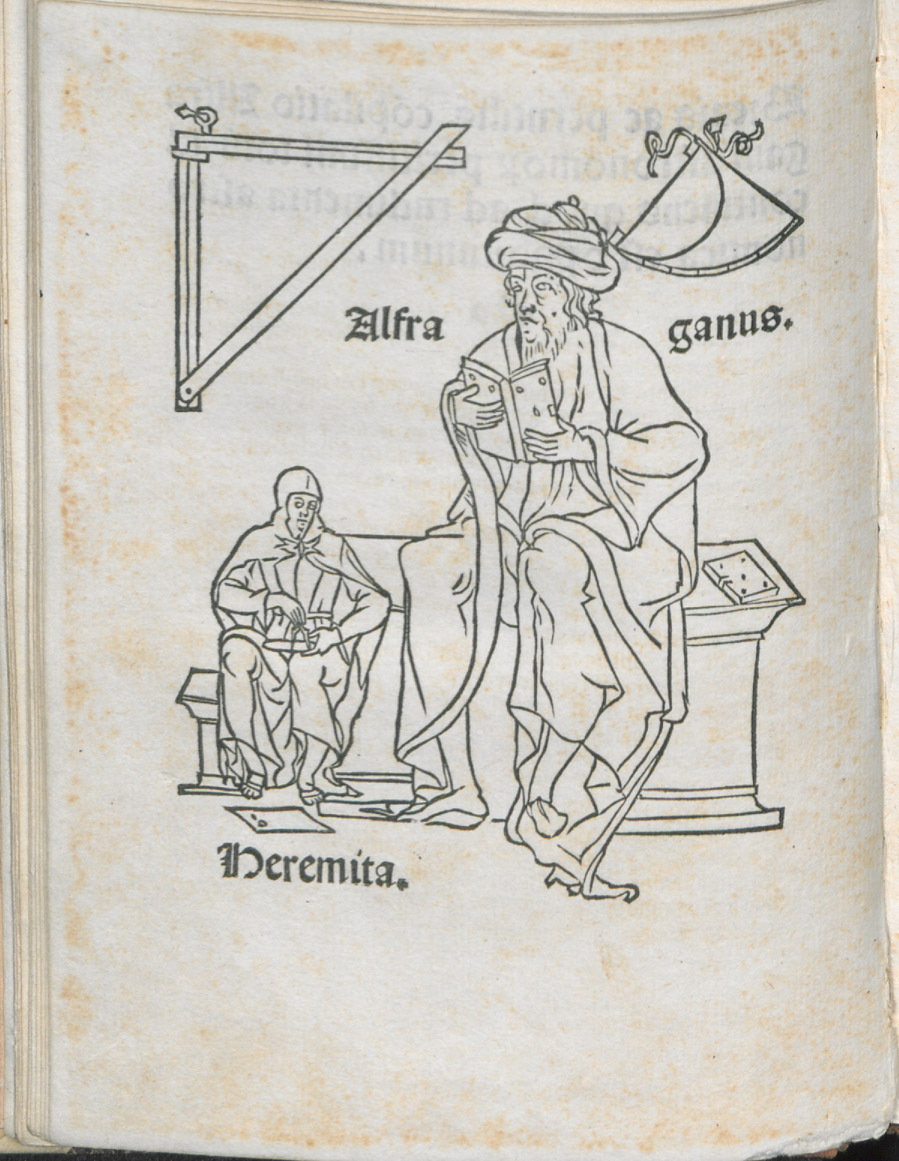
Portrait of Alfraganus in the Compilatio astronomica, 1493. Islamic astronomers collected and translated Indian, Persian and Greek texts, adding their own work.

Astronomy flourished in the medieval Islamic world. Astronomical observatories were established there by the early 9th century. In 964, the Andromeda Galaxy, the largest galaxy in the Local Group, was described by the Persian Muslim astronomer Abd al-Rahman al-Sufi in his Book of Fixed Stars. The SN 1006 supernova, the brightest apparent magnitude stellar event in the last 1000 years, was observed by the Egyptian Arabic astronomer Ali ibn Ridwan and Chinese astronomers in 1006. Iranian scholar Al-Biruni observed that, contrary to Ptolemy, the Sun's apogee (highest point in the heavens) was mobile, not fixed. Arabic astronomers introduced many Arabic names now used for individual stars.

The ruins at Great Zimbabwe and Timbuktu may have housed astronomical observatories. In Post-classical West Africa, astronomers studied the movement of stars and relation to seasons, crafting charts of the heavens and diagrams of orbits of the other planets based on complex mathematical calculations. Songhai historian Mahmud Kati documented a meteor shower in 1583.

In medieval Europe, Richard of Wallingford (1292–1336) invented the first astronomical clock, the Rectangulus which allowed for the measurement of angles between planets and other astronomical bodies, as well as an equatorium called the Albion which could be used for astronomical calculations such as lunar, solar and planetary longitudes. Nicole Oresme (1320–1382) discussed evidence for the rotation of the Earth. Jean Buridan (1300–1361) developed the theory of impetus, describing motions including of the celestial bodies. For over six centuries (from the recovery of ancient learning during the late Middle Ages into the Enlightenment), the Roman Catholic Church gave more financial and social support to the study of astronomy than probably all other institutions. Among the Church's motives was finding the date for Easter.

=== Copernicus ===
During the Renaissance, Nicolaus Copernicus proposed a heliocentric model of the solar system. While his model maintained circular orbits, it was sufficient to calculate the size of planetary orbits and their period. The appealing simplicity of Copernican astronomy led to its adoption among astronomers even before it was confirmed by Galileo's telescopic observations in the 1600s.

=== Early telescopic ===
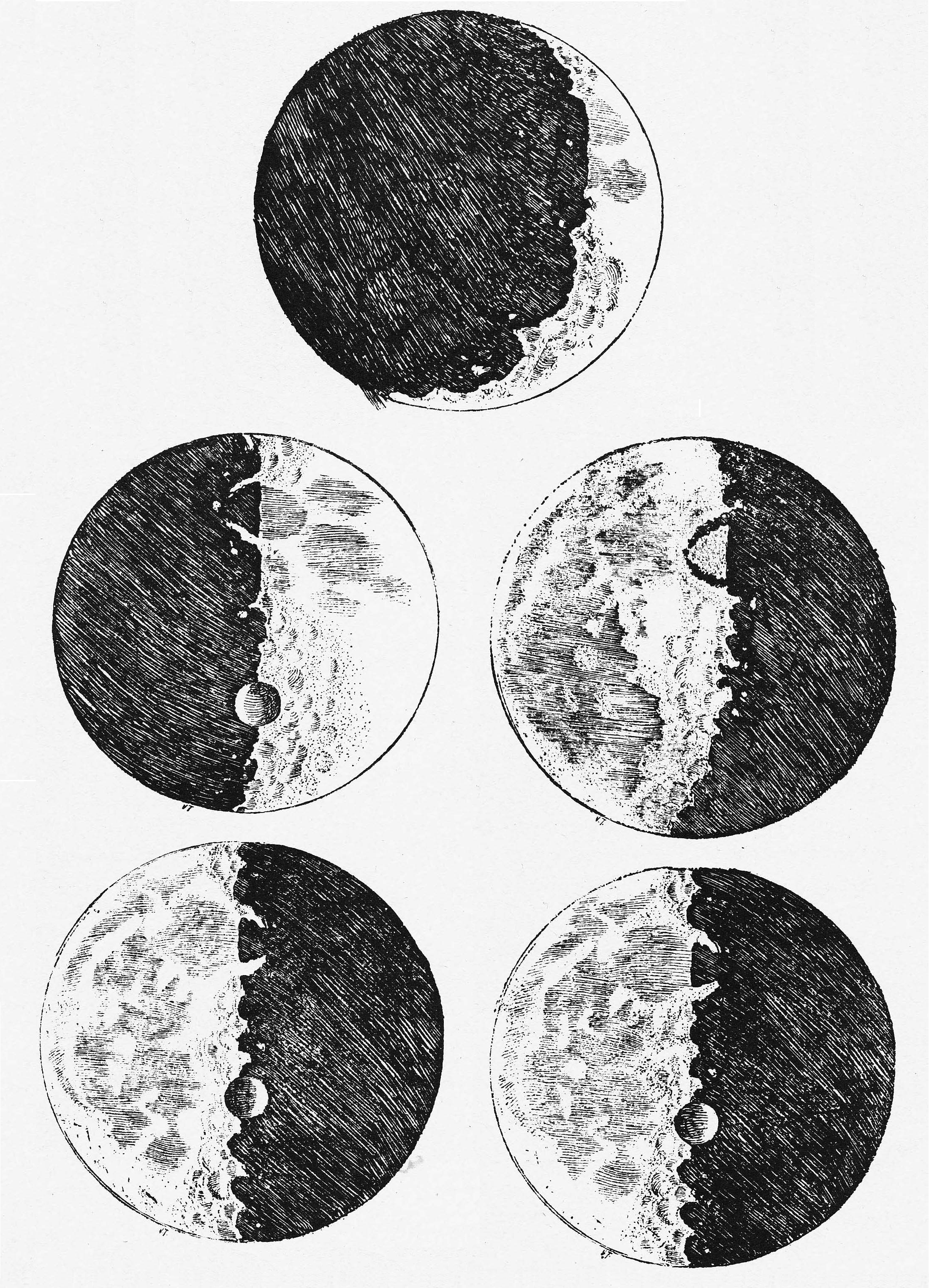
The first sketches of the Moon's topography, from Galileo's ground-breaking Sidereus Nuncius (1610)

Sometime around 1608 the telescope was invented and by 1610, Galileo Galilei observed phases on the planet Venus similar to those of the Moon, supporting the heliocentric model. Around the same time the heliocentric model was organized quantitatively by Johannes Kepler. Analyzing two decades of careful observations by Tycho Brahe, Kepler devised a system that described the details of the motion of the planets around the Sun. While Kepler discarded the uniform circular motion of Copernicus in favor of elliptical motion, he did not succeed in formulating a theory behind the laws he wrote down. It was Isaac Newton, with his invention of celestial dynamics and his law of gravitation, who finally explained the motions of the planets. Newton also developed the reflecting telescope. Newton, in collaboration with Richard Bentley proposed that stars are like the Sun only much further away.

The new telescopes also altered ideas about stars. By 1610 Galileo discovered that the band of light crossing the sky at night that we call the Milky Way was composed of numerous stars. In 1668 James Gregory compared the luminosity of Jupiter to Sirius to estimate its distance at over 83,000 AU. The English astronomer John Flamsteed, Britain's first Astronomer Royal, catalogued over 3000 stars but the data were published against his wishes in 1712. The astronomer William Herschel made a detailed catalog of nebulosity and clusters, and in 1781 discovered the planet Uranus, the first new planet found. Friedrich Bessel developed the technique of stellar parallax in 1838 but it was so difficult to apply that only about 100 stars were measured by 1900.

During the 18–19th centuries, the study of the three-body problem by Leonhard Euler, Alexis Claude Clairaut, and Jean le Rond d'Alembert led to more accurate predictions about the motions of the Moon and planets. This work was further refined by Joseph-Louis Lagrange and Pierre Simon Laplace, allowing the masses of the planets and moons to be estimated from their perturbations.

Significant advances in astronomy came about with the introduction of new technology, including the spectroscope and astrophotography. In 1814–15, Joseph von Fraunhofer discovered some 574 dark lines in the spectrum of the sun and of other stars. In 1859, Gustav Kirchhoff ascribed these lines to the presence of different elements.

=== Galaxies ===
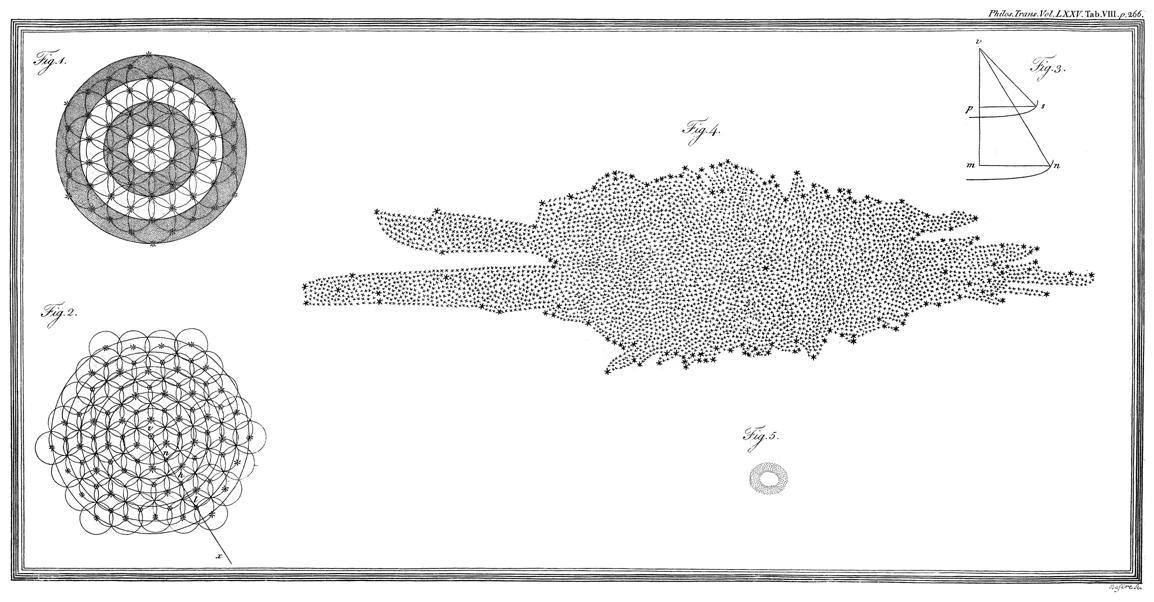
Diagram of the stars, from William Herschel's On the construction of the heavens.

In the late 1700s William Herschel mapped the distribution of stars in different directions from Earth, concluding that the universe consisted of the Sun near the center of disk of stars, the Milky Way. After John Michell demonstrated that stars differ in intrinsic luminosity and after Herschel's own observations with more powerful telescopes that additional stars appeared in all directions, astronomers began to consider that some of the fuzzy spiral nebulae were distant island Universes.

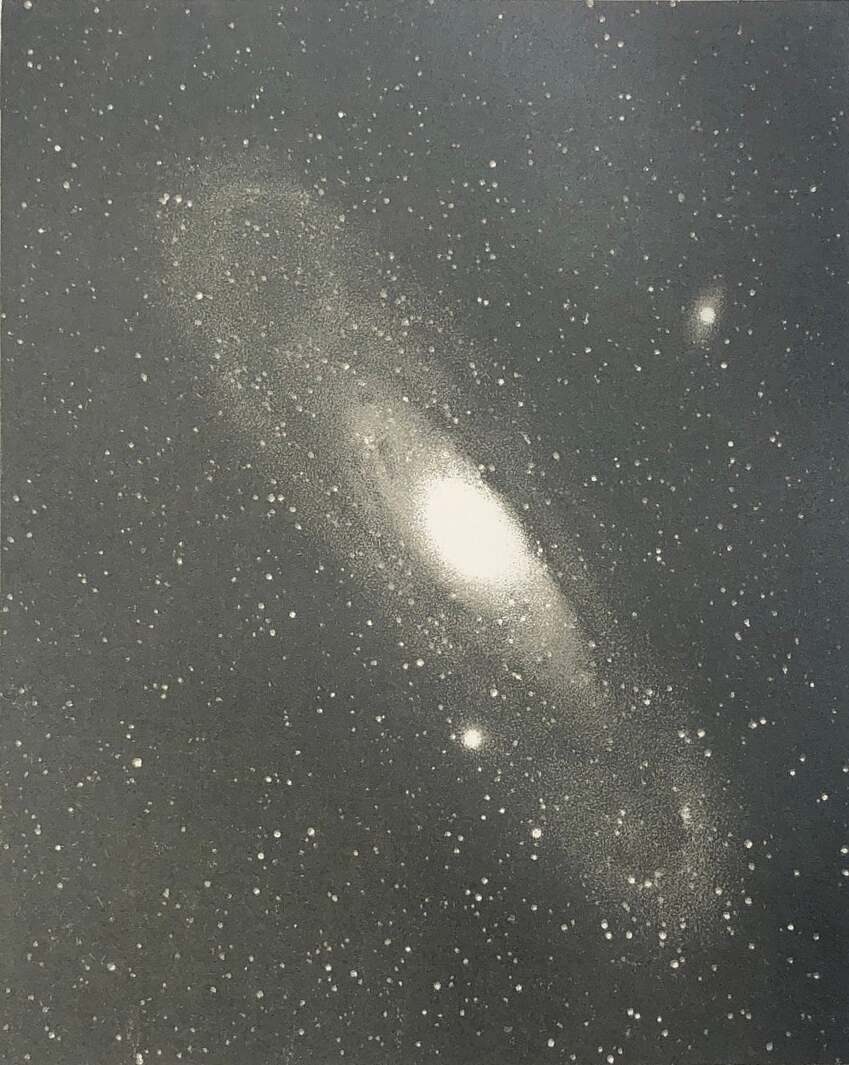
Photograph of the Great Andromeda "Nebula" by Isaac Roberts in 1888.

The existence of galaxies, including the Earth's galaxy, the Milky Way, as a group of stars was only demonstrated in the 20th century. In 1912, Henrietta Leavitt discovered Cepheid variable stars with well-defined, periodic luminosity changes which can be used to fix the star's true luminosity which then becomes an accurate tool for distance estimates. Using Cepheid variable stars, Harlow Shapley constructed the first accurate map of the Milky Way. Using the Hooker Telescope, Edwin Hubble identified Cepheid variables in several spiral nebulae and in 1922–1923 proved conclusively that Andromeda Nebula and Triangulum among others, were entire galaxies outside our own, thus proving that the universe consists of a multitude of galaxies.

=== Cosmology ===
Albert Einstein's 1917 publication of general relativity began the modern era of theoretical models of the universe as a whole. In 1922, Alexander Friedman published simplified models for the universe showing static, expanding and contracting solutions. In 1929 Hubble published observations that the galaxies are all moving away from Earth with a velocity proportional to distance, a relation now known as Hubble's law. This relation is expected if the universe is expanding. The consequence that the universe was once very dense and hot, a Big Bang concept expounded by Georges Lemaître in 1927, was discussed but no experimental evidence was available to support it. From the 1940s on, nuclear reaction rates under high density conditions were studied leading to the development of a successful model of big bang nucleosynthesis in the late 1940s and early 1950s. Then in 1965 cosmic microwave background radiation was discovered, cementing the evidence for the Big Bang.

Astrophysics predicted the existence of objects such as black holes and neutron stars. These have been used to explain phenomena such as quasars and pulsars.

Space telescopes have enabled measurements in parts of the electromagnetic spectrum normally blocked or blurred by the atmosphere. The LIGO project detected evidence of gravitational waves in 2015.

Overview of types of observational astronomy, relating wavelengths and their observability

== Observational astronomy ==
Observational astronomy relies on many different wavelengths of electromagnetic radiation and the forms of astronomy are categorized according to the corresponding region of the electromagnetic spectrum on which the observations are made. Specific information on these subfields is given below.

=== Radio ===
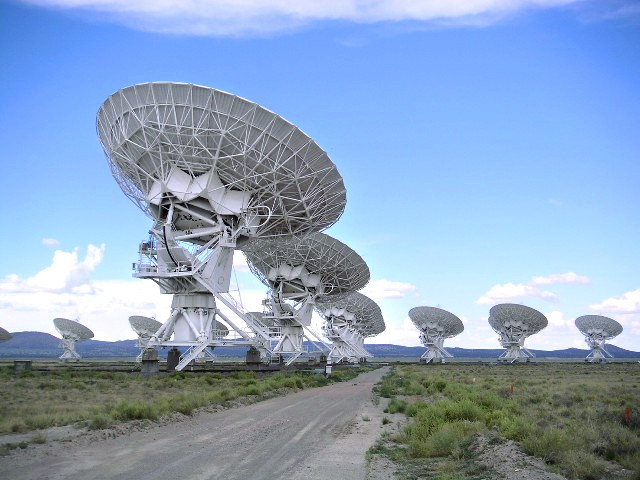
The Very Large Array in New Mexico, a radio telescope

Radio astronomy uses radiation with long wavelengths, mainly between 1 millimeter and 15 meters (frequencies from 20 MHz to 300 GHz), far outside the visible range. Hydrogen, otherwise an invisible gas, produces a spectral line at 21 cm (1420 MHz) which is observable at radio wavelengths. Objects observable at radio wavelengths include interstellar gas, pulsars, fast radio bursts, supernovae, and active galactic nuclei.

=== Infrared ===
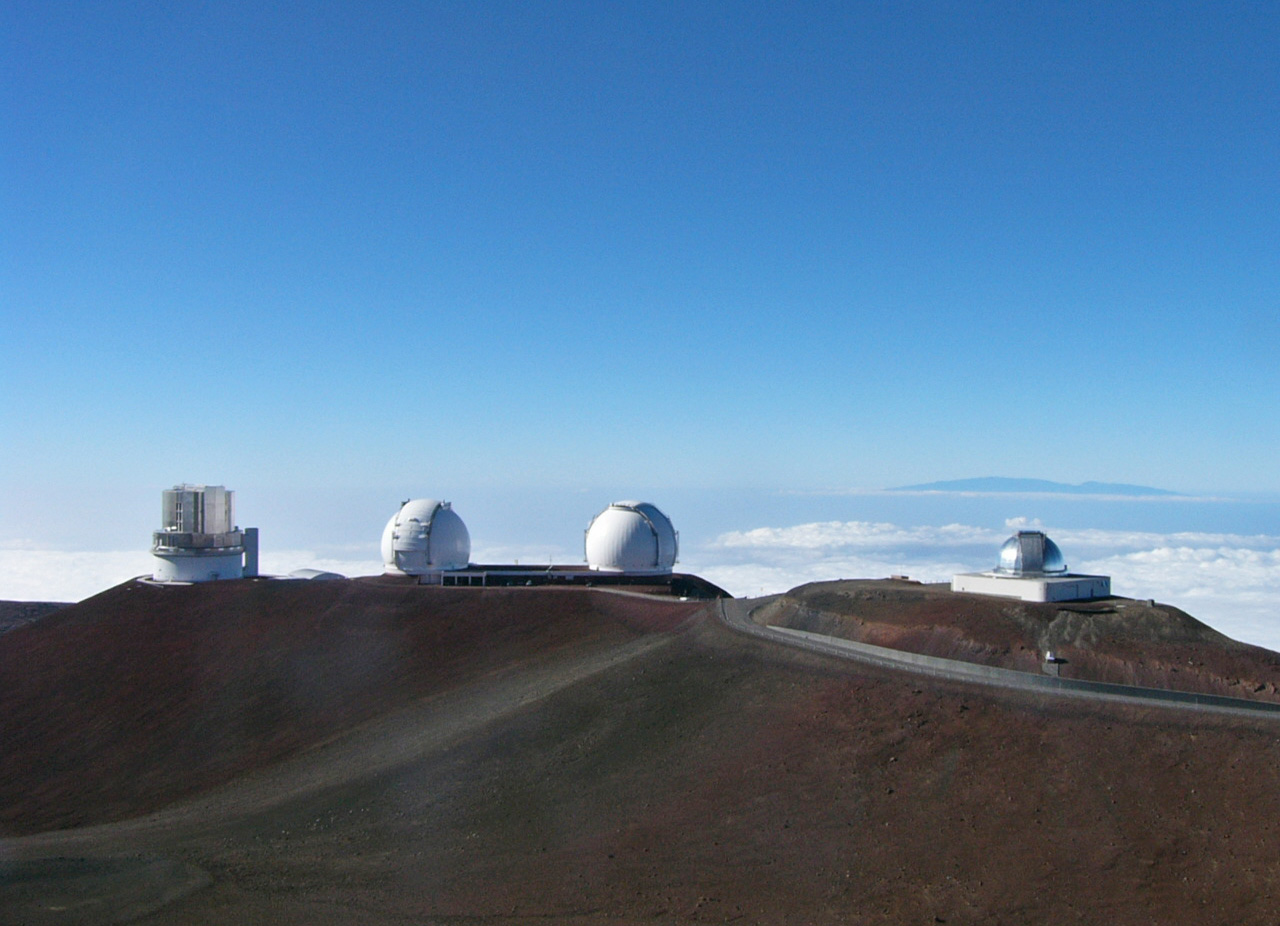
The Subaru Telescope (left) and Keck Observatory (center) on Mauna Kea, both observatories that operate at near-infrared and visible wavelengths. The NASA Infrared Telescope Facility (right) is an example of a telescope that operates only at near-infrared wavelengths.

Infrared astronomy detects infrared radiation with wavelengths longer than red visible light, outside the range of our vision. The infrared spectrum is useful for studying objects that are too cold to radiate visible light, such as planets, circumstellar disks or nebulae whose light is blocked by dust. The longer wavelengths of infrared can penetrate clouds of dust that block visible light, allowing the observation of young stars embedded in molecular clouds and the cores of galaxies. Observations from the Wide-field Infrared Survey Explorer (WISE) have been particularly effective at unveiling numerous galactic protostars and their host star clusters.

With the exception of infrared wavelengths close to visible light, such radiation is heavily absorbed by the atmosphere, or masked, as the atmosphere itself produces significant infrared emission. Consequently, infrared observatories have to be located in high, dry places on Earth or in space. Some molecules radiate strongly in the infrared. This allows the study of the chemistry of space.

The James Webb Space Telescope senses infrared radiation to detect very distant galaxies. Visible light from these galaxies was emitted billions of years ago and the expansion of the universe shifted the light in to the infrared range. By studying these distant galaxies astronomers hope to learn about the formation of the first galaxies.

=== Optical ===
Historically, optical astronomy, which has been also called visible light astronomy, is the oldest form of astronomy. Images of observations were originally drawn by hand. In the late 19th century and most of the 20th century, images were made using photographic equipment. Modern images are made using digital detectors, particularly using charge-coupled devices (CCDs) and recorded on modern medium. Although visible light itself extends from approximately 380 to 700 nm that same equipment can be used to observe some near-ultraviolet and near-infrared radiation.

=== Ultraviolet ===
Ultraviolet astronomy employs ultraviolet wavelengths which are absorbed by the Earth's atmosphere, requiring observations from the upper atmosphere or from space. Ultraviolet astronomy is best suited to the study of thermal radiation and spectral emission lines from hot blue OB stars that are very bright at these wavelengths.

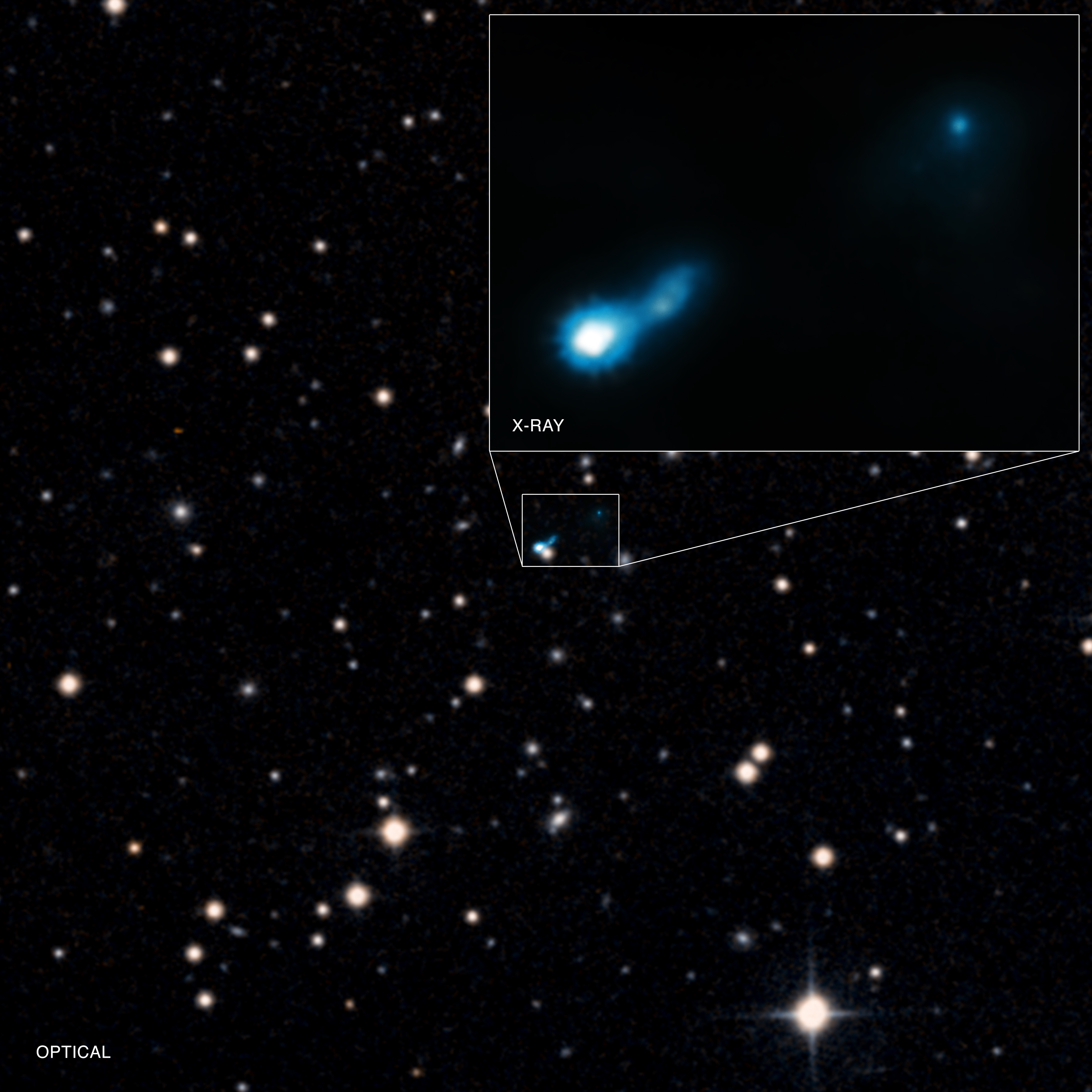
X-ray jet made from a supermassive black hole found by NASA's Chandra X-ray Observatory, made visible by light from the early Universe

=== X-ray ===
X-ray astronomy uses X-radiation, produced by extremely hot and high-energy processes. Since X-rays are absorbed by the Earth's atmosphere, observations must be performed at high altitude, such as from balloons, rockets, or specialized satellites. X-ray sources include X-ray binaries, supernova remnants, clusters of galaxies, and active galactic nuclei. Since the Sun's surface is relatively cool, X-ray images of the Sun and other stars give valuable information on the hot solar corona.

=== Gamma-ray ===
Gamma ray astronomy observes astronomical objects at the shortest wavelengths (highest energy) of the electromagnetic spectrum. Gamma rays may be observed directly by satellites such as the Compton Gamma Ray Observatory, or by specialized telescopes called atmospheric Cherenkov telescopes. Cherenkov telescopes do not detect the gamma rays directly but instead detect the flashes of visible light produced when gamma rays are absorbed by the Earth's atmosphere. Gamma-ray astronomy provides information on the origin of cosmic rays, possible annihilation events for dark matter, relativistic particles outflows from active galactic nuclei (AGN), and, using AGN as distant sources, properties of intergalactic space. Gamma-ray bursts, which radiate transiently, are extremely energetic events, and are the brightest (most luminous) phenomena in the universe.

=== Non-electromagnetic observation ===
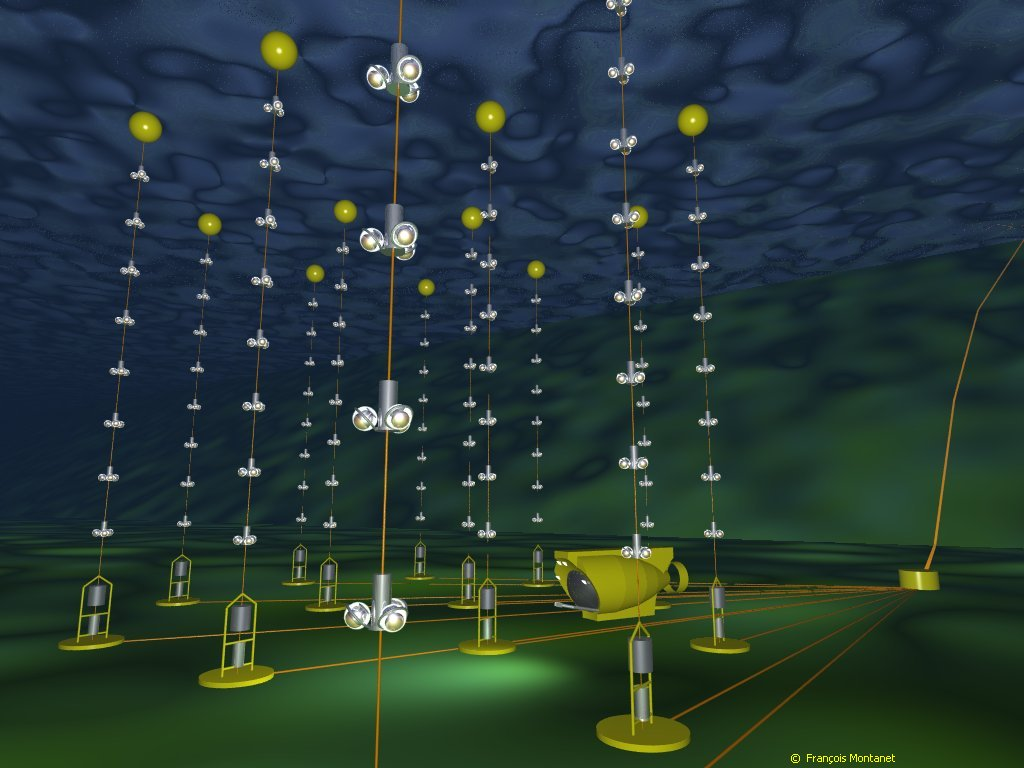
The underground ANTARES neutrino telescope

Some events originating from great distances may be observed from the Earth using systems that do not rely on electromagnetic radiation.

In neutrino astronomy, astronomers use heavily shielded underground facilities such as SAGE, GALLEX, and Kamioka II/III for the detection of neutrinos. The vast majority of the neutrinos streaming through the Earth originate from the Sun, but 24 neutrinos were also detected from supernova 1987A. Cosmic rays, which consist of very high energy particles (atomic nuclei) that can decay or be absorbed when they enter the Earth's atmosphere, result in a cascade of secondary particles which can be detected by current observatories.

Gravitational-wave astronomy employs gravitational-wave detectors to collect observational data about distant massive objects. A few observatories have been constructed, such as the Laser Interferometer Gravitational Observatory LIGO. LIGO made its first detection on 14 September 2015, observing gravitational waves from a binary black hole. A second gravitational wave was detected on 26 December 2015 and additional observations should continue but gravitational waves require extremely sensitive instruments.

The combination of observations made using electromagnetic radiation, neutrinos or gravitational waves and other complementary information, is known as multi-messenger astronomy.

=== Astrometry and celestial mechanics ===
Use of optical interferometry to determine precise positions of stars

One of the oldest fields in astronomy, and in all of science, is the measurement of the positions of celestial objects known as astrometry. Historically, accurate knowledge of the positions of the Sun, Moon, planets and stars has been essential in celestial navigation (the use of celestial objects to guide navigation) and in the making of calendars. Careful measurement of the positions of the planets has led to a solid understanding of gravitational perturbations, and an ability to determine past and future positions of the planets with great accuracy, a field known as celestial mechanics. The measurement of stellar parallax of nearby stars provides a fundamental baseline in the cosmic distance ladder that is used to measure the scale of the Universe. Parallax measurements of nearby stars provide an absolute baseline for the properties of more distant stars, as their properties can be compared. Measurements of the radial velocity and proper motion of stars allow astronomers to plot the movement of these systems through the Milky Way galaxy.

== Subfields by scale ==
=== Physical cosmology ===
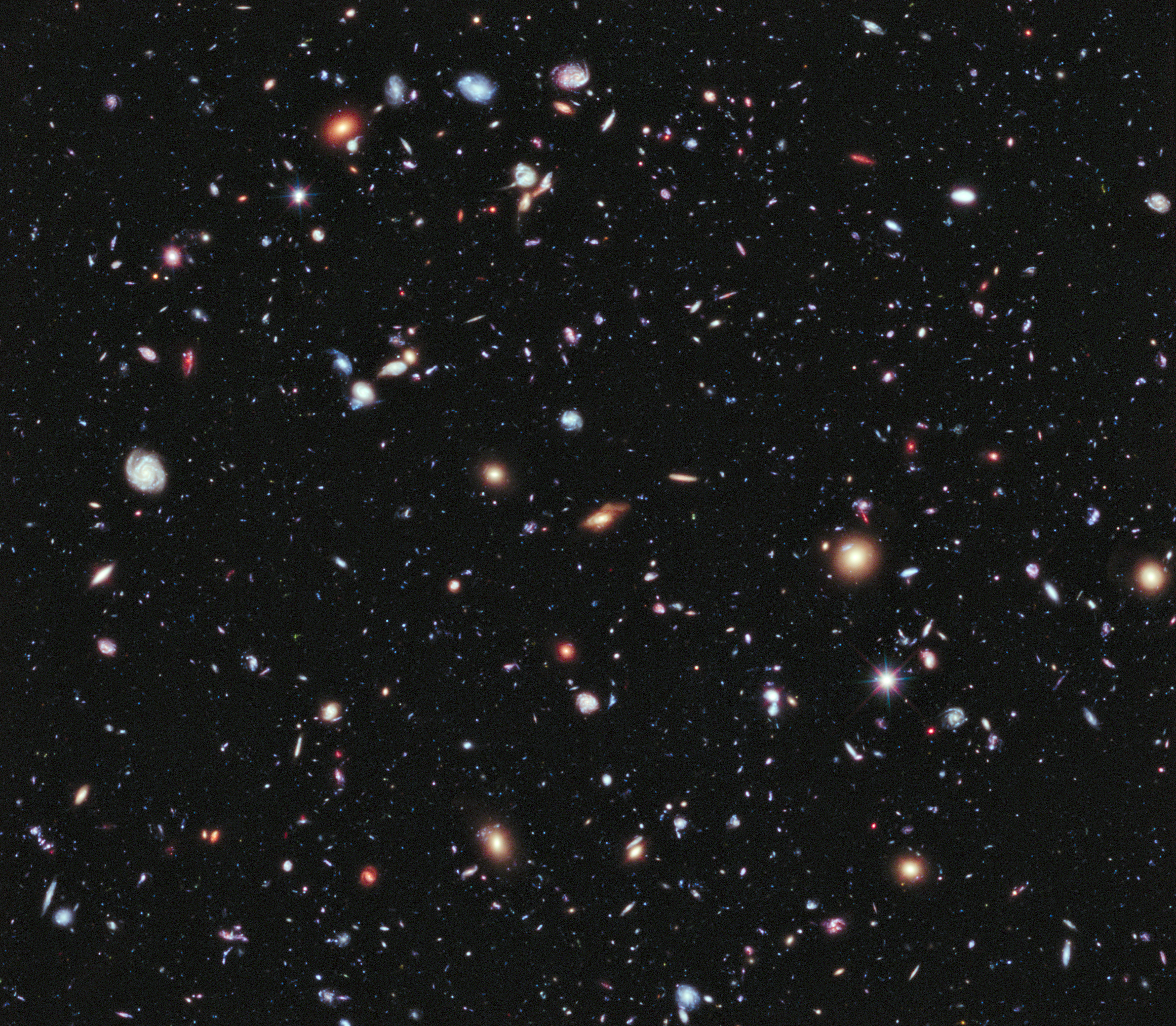
Hubble Extreme Deep Field

Physical cosmology, the study of large-scale structure of the Universe, seeks to understand the formation and evolution of the cosmos. Fundamental to modern cosmology is the well-accepted theory of the Big Bang, the concept that the universe begin extremely dense and hot, then expanded over the course of 13.8 billion years to its present condition. The concept of the Big Bang became widely accepted after the discovery of the microwave background radiation in 1965. Dark matter and dark energy are now thought form 96% of the mass of the Universe. For this reason, much effort is expended in trying to understand the physics of these components.

=== Extragalactic ===
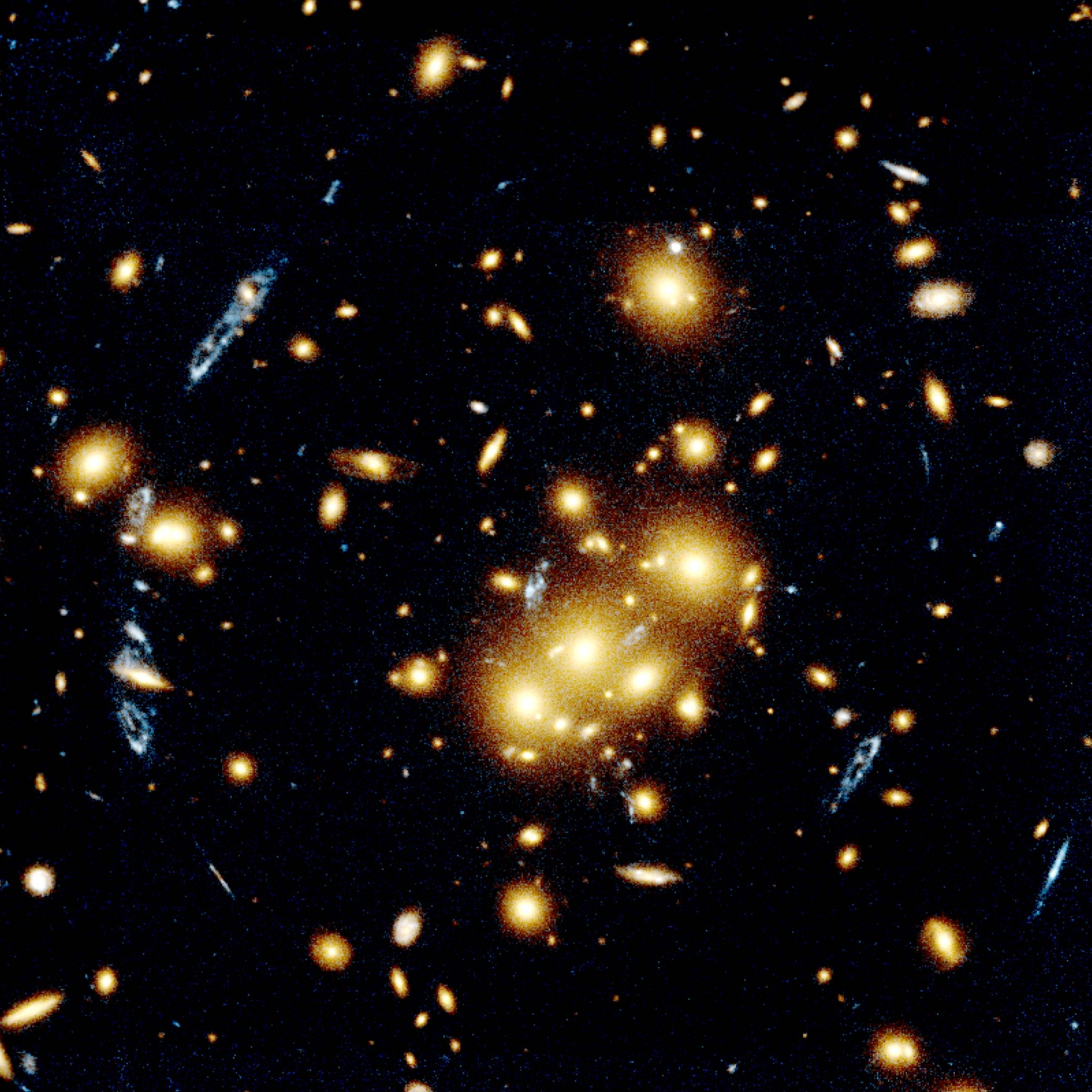
The blue, loop-shaped objects are multiple images of the same galaxy, duplicated by gravitational lensing. The cluster's gravitational field bends light, magnifying and distorting the image of a more distant object.

The study of objects outside our galaxy is concerned with the formation and evolution of galaxies, their morphology (description) and classification, the observation of active galaxies, and at a larger scale, the groups and clusters of galaxies. These assist the understanding of the large-scale structure of the cosmos.

=== Galactic ===
Galactic astronomy studies galaxies including the Milky Way, a barred spiral galaxy that is a prominent member of the Local Group of galaxies and contains the Solar System. It is a rotating mass of gas, dust, stars and other objects, held together by mutual gravitational attraction. As the Earth is within the dusty outer arms, large portions of the Milky Way are obscured from view.

Kinematic studies of matter in the Milky Way and other galaxies show there is more mass than can be accounted for by visible matter. A dark matter halo appears to dominate the mass, although the nature of this dark matter remains undetermined.

=== Stellar ===
The study of stars and stellar evolution is fundamental to our understanding of the Universe. The astrophysics of stars has been determined through observation and theoretical understanding; and from computer simulations of the interior. Aspects studied include star formation in giant molecular clouds; the formation of protostars; and the transition to nuclear fusion and main-sequence stars, carrying out nucleosynthesis. Further processes studied include stellar evolution, ending either with supernovae or white dwarfs. The ejection of the outer layers forms a planetary nebula. The remnant of a supernova is a dense neutron star, or, if the stellar mass was at least three times that of the Sun, a black hole.

=== Solar ===
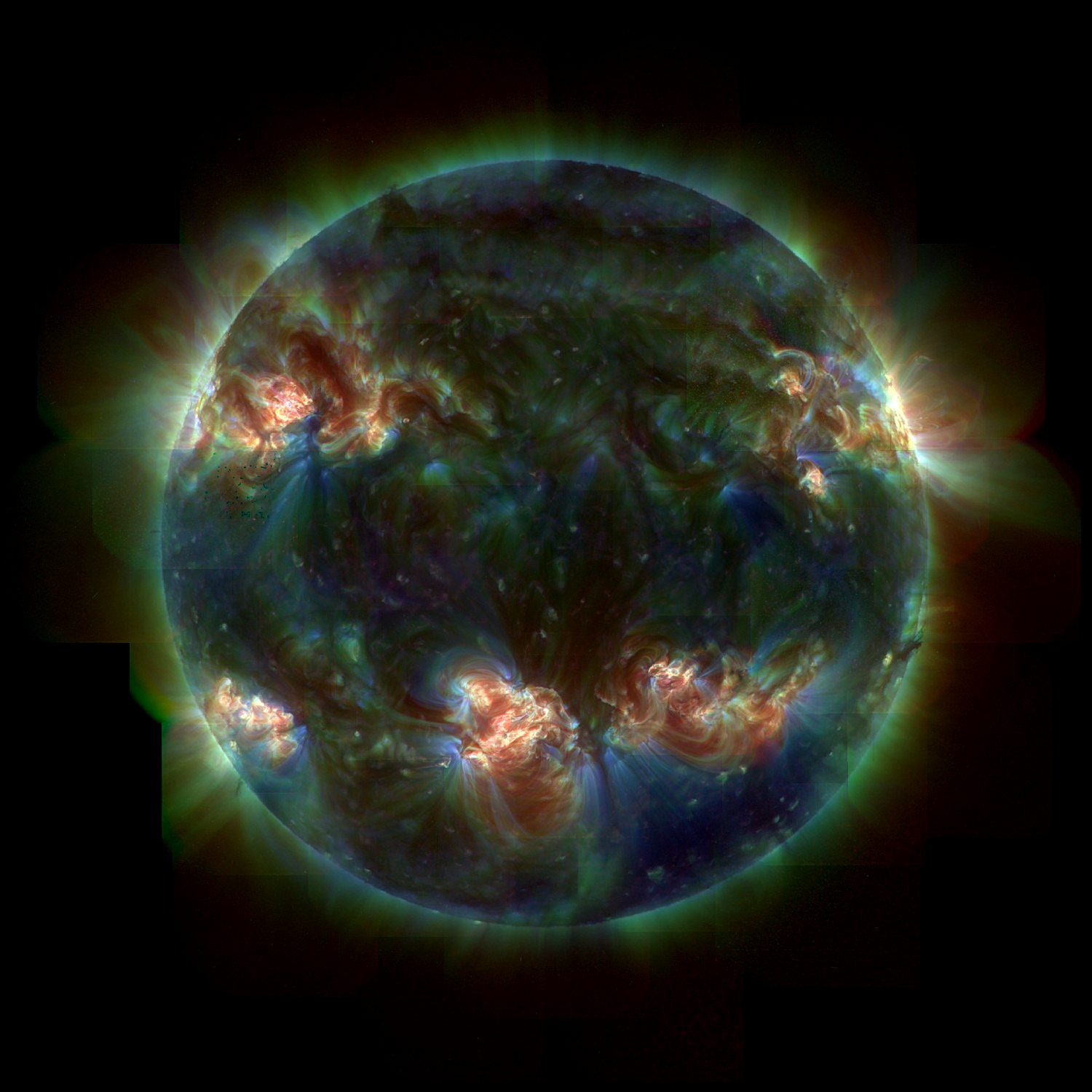
An ultraviolet image of the Sun's active photosphere as viewed by the NASA's TRACE space telescope.

Solar astronomy is the study of the Sun, a typical main-sequence dwarf star of stellar class G2 V, and about 4.6 billion years (Gyr) old. Processes studied by the science include the sunspot cycle, the sun's changes in luminosity, both steady and periodic, and the behavior of the sun's various layers, namely its core with its nuclear fusion, the radiation zone, the convection zone, the photosphere, the chromosphere, and the corona.

=== Planetary science ===
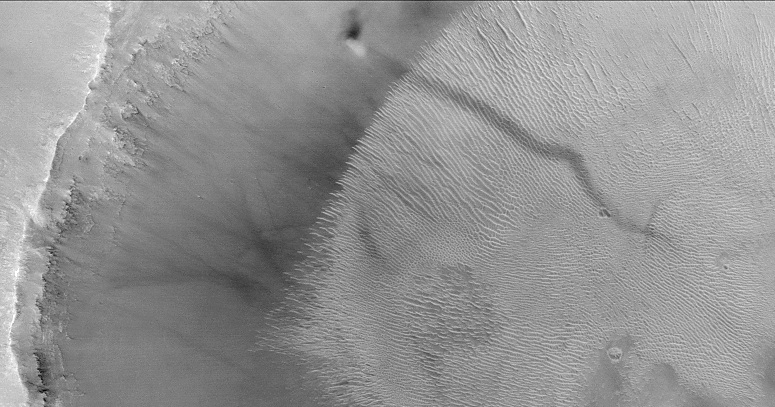
The black spot at the top is a dust devil climbing a crater wall on Mars. This moving, swirling column of Martian atmosphere (comparable to a terrestrial tornado) created the long, dark streak.

Planetary science is the study of the assemblage of planets, moons, dwarf planets, comets, asteroids, and other bodies orbiting the Sun, as well as exoplanets orbiting distant stars. The Solar System has been relatively well-studied, initially through telescopes and then later by spacecraft.

Processes studied include planetary differentiation; the generation of, and effects created by, a planetary magnetic field; and the creation of heat within a planet, such as by collisions, radioactive decay, and tidal heating. In turn, that heat can drive geologic processes such as volcanism, tectonics, and surface erosion, studied by branches of geology.

== Interdisciplinary subfields ==
=== Astrochemistry ===
Astrochemistry is an overlap of astronomy and chemistry. It studies the abundance and reactions of molecules in the Universe, and their interaction with radiation. The word "astrochemistry" may be applied to both the Solar System and the interstellar medium. Studies in this field contribute for example to the understanding of the formation of the Solar System.

=== Astrobiology ===
Astrobiology (or exobiology) studies the origin of life and its development other than on earth. It considers whether extraterrestrial life exists, and how humans can detect it if it does. It makes use of astronomy, biochemistry, geology, microbiology, physics, and planetary science to investigate the possibility of life on other worlds and help recognize biospheres that might be different from that on Earth. The origin and early evolution of life is an inseparable part of the discipline of astrobiology. That encompasses research on the origin of planetary systems, origins of organic compounds in space, rock-water-carbon interactions, abiogenesis on Earth, planetary habitability, research on biosignatures for life detection, and studies on the potential for life to adapt to challenges on Earth and in outer space.

=== Other ===
Astronomy and astrophysics have developed interdisciplinary links with other major scientific fields. Archaeoastronomy is the study of ancient or traditional astronomies in their cultural context, using archaeological and anthropological evidence. Astrostatistics is the application of statistics to the analysis of large quantities of observational astrophysical data. As "forensic astronomy", finally, methods from astronomy have been used to solve problems of art history and occasionally of law.

== Amateur ==
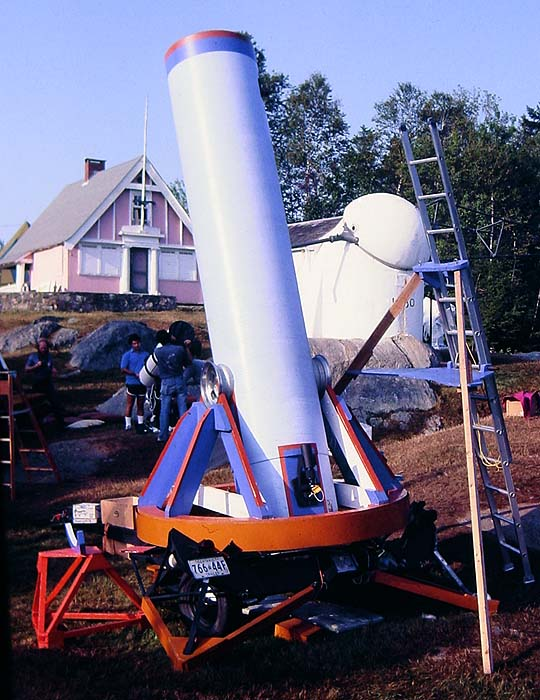
Amateur astronomers can build their own equipment, and hold star parties and gatherings, such as Stellafane.

Astronomy is one of the sciences to which amateurs can contribute the most. Collectively, amateur astronomers observe celestial objects and phenomena, sometimes with consumer-level equipment or equipment that they build themselves. Common targets include the Sun, the Moon, planets, stars, comets, meteor showers, and deep-sky objects such as star clusters, galaxies, and nebulae. Astronomy clubs throughout the world have programs to help their members set up and run observational programs such as to observe all the objects in the Messier (110 objects) or Herschel 400 catalogues. Most amateurs work at visible wavelengths, but some have experimented with wavelengths outside the visible spectrum. The pioneer of amateur radio astronomy, Karl Jansky, discovered a radio source at the centre of the Milky Way. Some amateur astronomers use homemade telescopes or radio telescopes originally built for astronomy research (e.g. the One-Mile Telescope).

Amateurs can make occultation measurements to refine the orbits of minor planets. They can discover comets, and perform regular observations of variable stars. Improvements in digital technology have allowed amateurs to make advances in astrophotography.

== Unsolved problems ==
In the 21st century, there remain important unanswered questions in astronomy. Some are cosmic in scope: for example, what are the dark matter and dark energy that dominate the evolution and fate of the cosmos? What will be the ultimate fate of the universe? Why is the abundance of lithium in the cosmos four times lower than predicted by the standard Big Bang model? Others pertain to more specific classes of phenomena. For example, is the Solar System normal or atypical? What is the origin of the stellar mass spectrum, i.e. why do astronomers observe the same distribution of stellar masses—the initial mass function—regardless of initial conditions? Likewise, questions remain about the formation of the first galaxies, the origin of supermassive black holes, the source of ultra-high-energy cosmic rays, and whether there is other life in the Universe, especially other intelligent life.

== See also ==
- Cosmogony – Theory or model concerning the origin of the universe
- Outline of astronomy – Overview of the scientific field of astronomy
- Outline of space science – Overview of and topical guide to space science
- Space exploration – Investigation of outer space
- Local (astronomy)

=== Lists ===
- Glossary of astronomy
- List of astronomers
- List of astronomical instruments
- List of astronomical observatories
- List of astronomy acronyms
- List of astronomical societies
- List of software for astronomy research and education

== Sources ==
- Forbes, George (1909). History of Astronomy. London, England: Plain Label Books. ISBN 978-1-60303-159-2. Archived from the original on 28 August 2018.
- Harpaz, Amos (1994). Stellar Evolution. A K Peters. ISBN 978-1-56881-012-6.
- Unsöld, A.; Baschek, B. (2001). The New Cosmos: An Introduction to Astronomy and Astrophysics. Springer. ISBN 978-3-540-67877-9.
