= Torquetum =

Medieval astronomical instrument

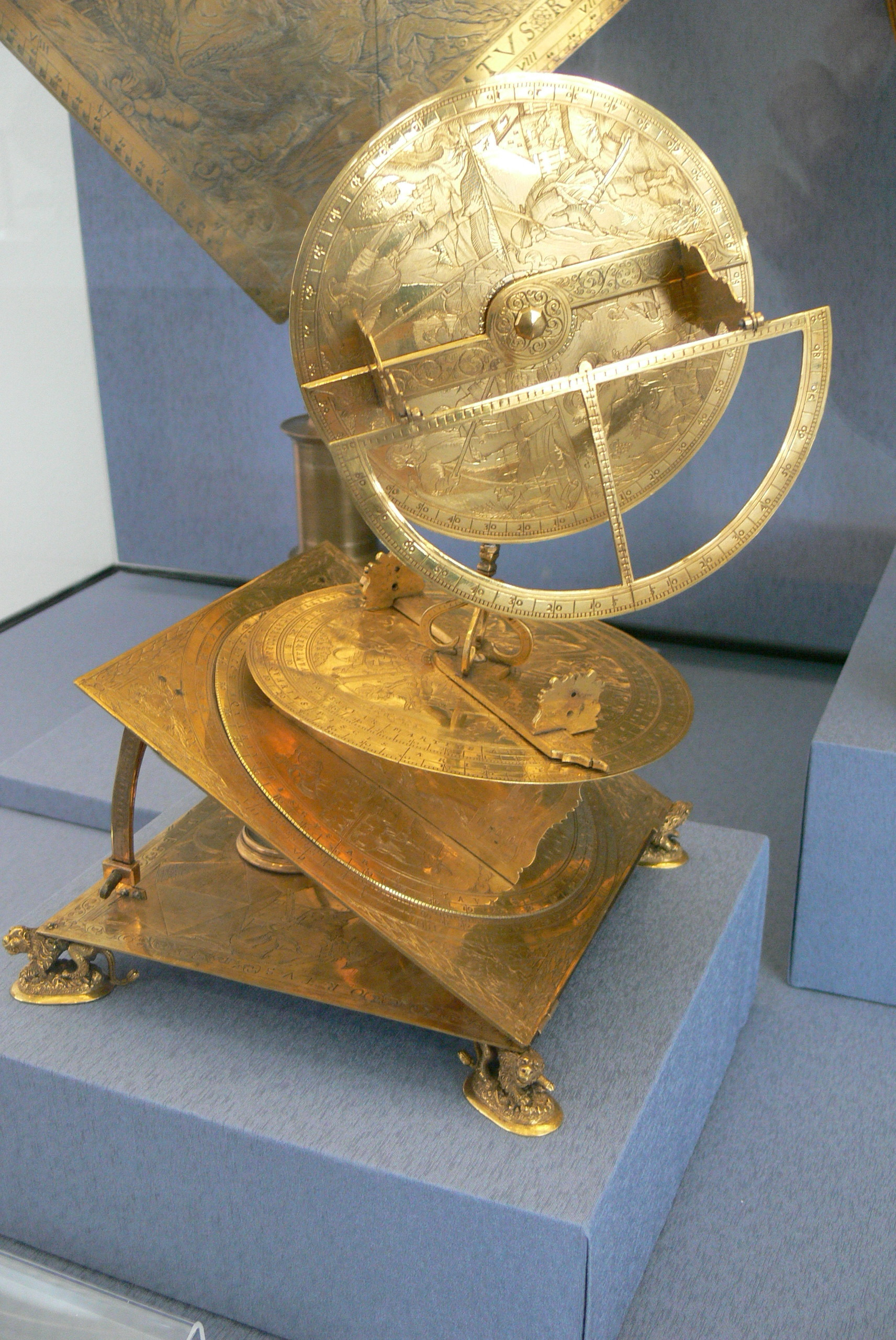
Torquetum (1568), made by Johannes Praetorius in Nuremberg

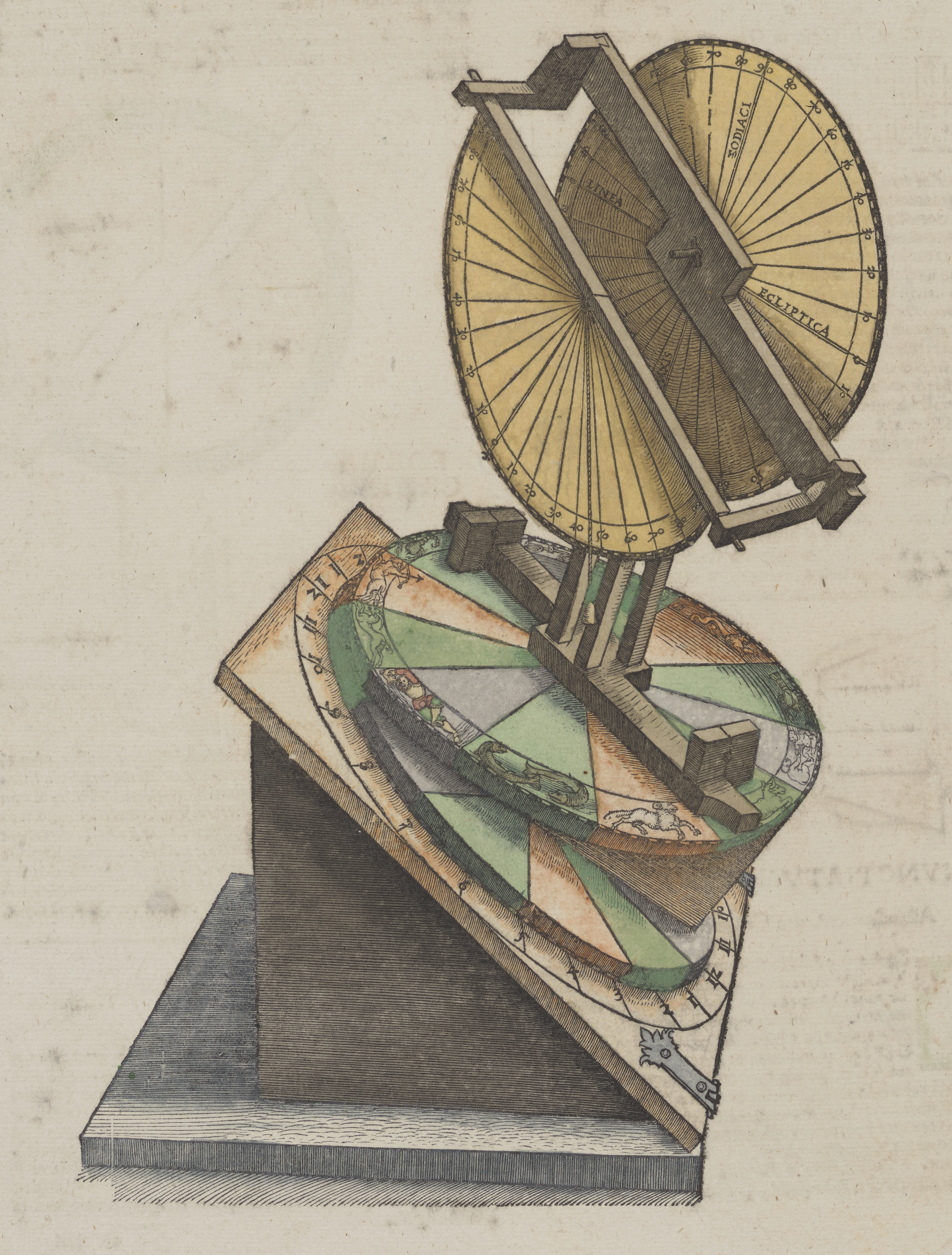
Engraving of a Torquetum

The torquetum or turquet is a medieval astronomical instrument for taking and converting measurements made in three sets of coordinates: horizon, equatorial, and ecliptic. It is characterised by R. P. Lorch as a combination of Ptolemy's astrolabon (Greek: αστρολάβον) and the plane astrolabe. In a sense, the torquetum is an analog computer.

== Invention ==
The origins of the torquetum are unclear. Its invention has been credited to multiple figures, including Jabir ibn Aflah, Bernard of Verdun and Franco of Poland.

In 1469, Regiomontanus credited an 11th-century Arab astronomer from Seville, Jabir ibn Aflah. Later, in 1598, Tycho Brahe speculated that it was a 12th-century creation of "Arabians or Chaldeans." Eventually, early 20th-century German historians shifted the attribution to the "Turks." Jabir ibn Aflah of Al-Andalus in the early 12th century has been assumed by several historians to be the inventor of the torquetum, based on a similar instrument he described in his Islah Almajisti. However, while his device is similar in function, it has not been identified as a torquetum, but evidence suggests it inspired the torquetum.

According to Joseph Needham, a simplified version of the torquetum was among the instruments documented at the imperial Chinese observatory of the Yuan dynasty from 1276 to 1279. He credited Jamal al-Din Muhammad al-Najjari as the possible transmitter of this Arabic invention to China in 1267.

In Europe, the first known references to the instrument are found in Latin texts dating to the 1280s. These foundational documents introduce the term turketum to describe the device, but they omit both the identity of its creator and the origin of its name. Accounts of the torquetum appear in the 13th century writings of Bernard of Verdun and Franco of Poland. Franco of Poland's work was published in 1284; however, Bernard of Verdun's work does not contain a date. Therefore, it is impossible to know which work was written first. Franco's work was more widely known and is credited with the distribution of knowledge about the torquetum.

The only surviving examples of the torquetum are dated from the 16th century. In the middle of the 16th century, the torquetum had numerous structural changes to the original design. The most important change was by instrument-maker, Erasmus Habermel. His alteration allowed for astronomers to make observations to all three of the scales.

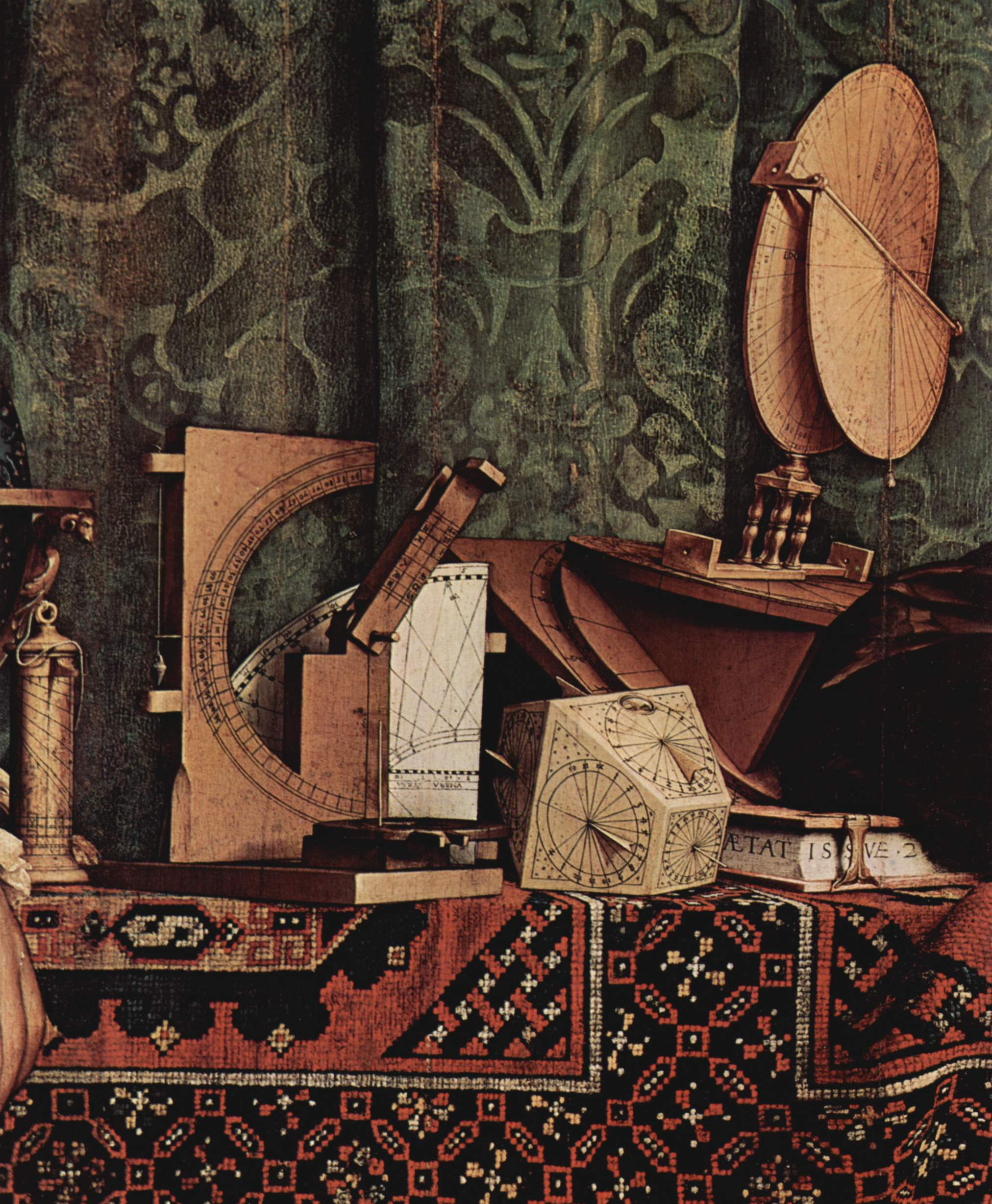
Detail from The Ambassadors, a 1533 painting by Hans Holbein the Younger

A torquetum can be seen in the famous portrait The Ambassadors (1533) by Hans Holbein the Younger. It is placed on the right side of the table, next to and above the elbow of the ambassador clad in a long brown coat or robe. The painting shows much of the details of the inscriptions on the disk and half disk, which make up the top of this particular kind of torquetum.

A 14th century instrument, the rectangulus, was invented by Richard of Wallingford. This carried out the same task as the torquetum, but was calibrated with linear scales, read by plumb lines. This simplified the spherical trigonometry by resolving the polar measurements directly into their Cartesian components.

== Notable historic uses ==
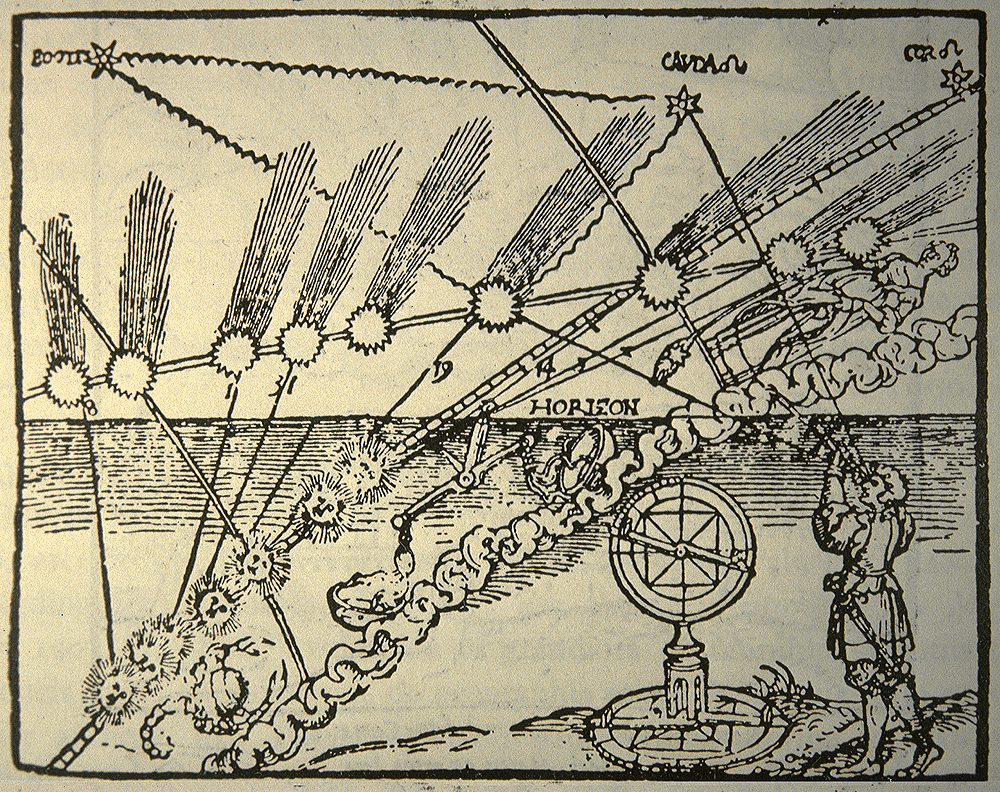
This is the first image that appears on Peter Apian's book Astronomicium Caesareum of 1540. Apian uses the torquetum to view the comet of 1532.

Following the conception of the torquetum, the device had been put through many of the following uses. The astronomer, Peter of Limoges, used this device for his observation of what is known today as Halley's Comet at the turn of the 14th century. In the early 1300s, John of Murs mentions the torquetum as his defence "of the reliability of observational astronomy", thus further solidifying its practicality and viability in ancient astronomy. Additionally, Johannes Schoner built a torquetum model for his own personal use in the observation of Halley's Comet in the 1500s.

The best-documented account of the torquetum was done by Peter Apian in 1532. Peter Apian was a German humanist, specializing in astronomy, mathematics, and cartography. In his book Astronomicum Caesareum (1540), Apian gives a description of the torquetum near the end of the second part. He also details how the device is used. Apian explains that the torquetum was used for astronomical observations and how the description of the instrument was used as a basis for common astronomical instruments. He also notes the manufacturing process of the instrument and the use of the torquetum for astronomical measurements.

== Components ==
The torquetum is a complex medieval analog computer that measures three sets of astronomical coordinates: the horizon, equatorial, and ecliptic. One of the defining attributes of the torquetum is its ability to interconvert between these three sets of coordinate dimensions without the use of calculations, as well as to demonstrate the relationship between the same coordinate sets. However, it is a device that requires a thorough understanding of the components and how they work together to make relative positional measurements of certain celestial objects.

The anatomy of the torquetum involves many different components, which can be grouped into subdivisions of the torquetum structure, those being: the base, the midframe, and the upperframe. The base starts with the tabula orizontis, which is the bottommost rectangular piece in contact with the ground, and this component represents the horizon of the Earth, relative to the point of measurement. Hinged to the tabula orizontis is a similarly shaped component, the tabula equinoctialis, which represents the latitude of the Earth. This piece can rotate up to 90 degrees, coinciding with the latitudinal lines of the Earth from the equator to the poles. This angle of rotation is created by the stylus, which is an arm mechanism that pins to the slotted holes, which are part of the tabula orizontis.

The midframe of the torquetum consists of a free-spinning disk (unnamed) that can be locked into place, and the tabula orbis signorum, directly hinged to it above. The angle between these two pieces is defined by the basilica, a solid stand piece, which is used to either set the draft angle at 0 degrees (Where the basilica is removed) or 23.5 degrees, representing the off-set of the axis of rotation of the Earth. Whether or not the basilica is included depends on the point of measurement either below or above the tropical latitudinal lines. Inscribed on the tabula equinoctialis along, although separate from, the outer perimeter of the bottom disk is a 24-hour circle, which is used to measure the angle between the longitudinal line facing the poles, and the line to the object being measured.

Lastly, the upper frame is made up of the crista, the semis and the perpendiculum. The base of the crista is joined to another free-spinning disk directly above the tabula orbis signorum.

Similarly, on the outer edge of the tabula orbis signorum is a zodiacal calendar and degree scale, with each of the 12 signs divided amongst it. This scale measures the zodiacal sector of the sky the object being measured is in. The crista itself is a circular piece that corresponds with the meridian of the celestial sphere, which has four quadrants inscribed along the edges, each starting at 0 degrees along the horizontal, and 90 degrees along the vertical. Adjacent, and locked with the crista at 23.5 degrees angle is the semis, which is a half-circle composed of two quadrants starting at 0 degrees along the vertical (relative to 23.5-degree placement) and 90 degrees at the horizontal. Finally, the last major component is the perpendicular, a free-hanging pendulum which measures the angle between the radial line of the Earth and the measured object using the semis.

== Parts and configurations ==
The base of the instrument represents the horizon and is built on a hinge and a part known as the stylus holds the instrument up to the viewer's complementary latitude. This represents the celestial equator and the angle varies depending on where the view is located on Earth. The several plates and circles that make up the upper portion of the instrument represent the celestial sphere. These parts are built on top of the base and above the basilica, which rotates on a pin to represent the axis of the Earth. The zodiac calendar is inscribed on the tabula orbis signorum this is part of the mechanical aspects of the instrument that take away the tedious calculations required in previous instruments.

The versatility of the "torquetum" can be seen in its three possible configurations for the measuring. The first method used lays the instruments flat on a table with no angles within the instrument set. This configuration gives the coordinates of celestial bodies as related to the horizon. The basilica is set so that 0 degree mark faces north. The user can now measure altitude of the target celestial body as well as use the base as a compass for viewing the possible paths they travel. The second configuration uses the stylus to elevate the base set at co-latitude of 90 degrees. The position of the celestial bodies can now be measured in hours, minutes, and seconds using the inscribed clock on the almuri. This helps give the proper ascension and decline coordinates of the celestial bodies as they travel through space. The zero point for ascension and decline coordinates of the celestial bodies as they travel through space. The zero point for ascension is set to the vernal equinox while the end measurement (decline) is the equator, this would put the North Pole at the 90 degree point. The third and most commonly seen configuration of the "torquetum" uses all its assets to make measurements. The upper portion is now set at an angle equal to the obliquity of the ecliptic, which allows the instrument to give ecliptic coordinates. This measures the celestial bodies now on celestial latitude and longitude scales which allow for greater precision and accuracy in making measurements. These three differing configurations allowed for added convenience in taking readings and made once tedious and complicated measuring more streamlined and simple.

== Notes and references ==
- Ralf Kern: Wissenschaftliche Instrumente in ihrer Zeit. Vom 15. – 19. Jahrhundert. Verlag der Buchhandlung Walther König 2010, ISBN 978-3-86560-772-0
