= Richard of Wallingford =

English mathematician and astrologer

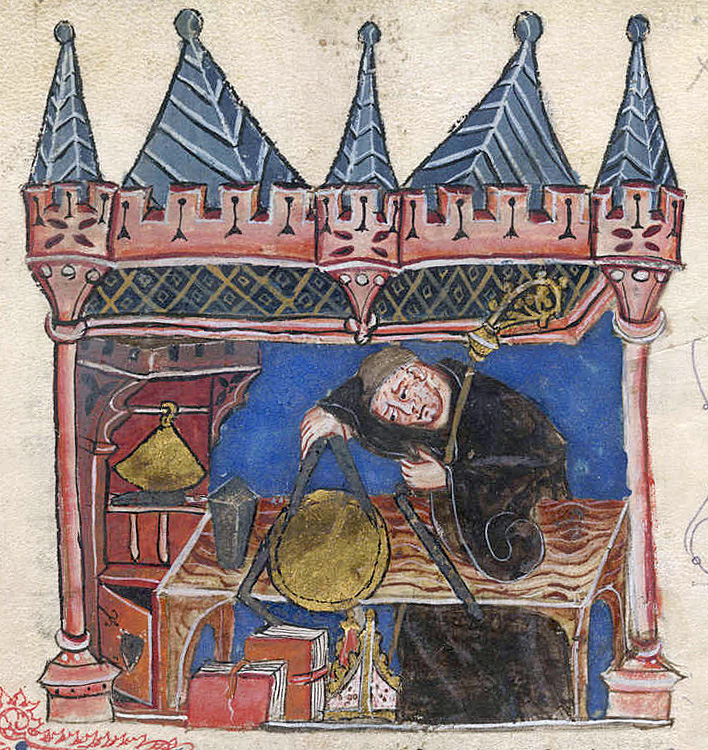
- Richard of Wallingford measuring with a pair of compasses in this 14th-century miniature.
- Born: 1292; Wallingford, England
- Died: 1336 (aged 43–44); St Albans
- Occupations: Astronomer, horologist, cleric, mathematician, astrologer

Richard of Wallingford (1292–1336) was an English mathematician, astronomer, horologist, and cleric who made major contributions to astronomy and horology while serving as abbot of St Albans Abbey in Hertfordshire.

== Biography ==
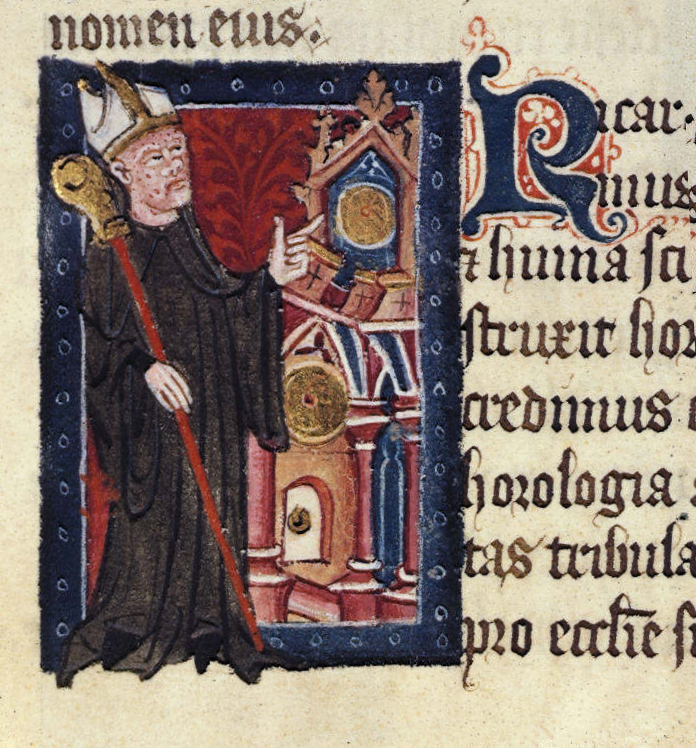
Richard of Wallingford pointing to a clock, in reference to his gift to the abbey. His face is disfigured, possibly by leprosy.

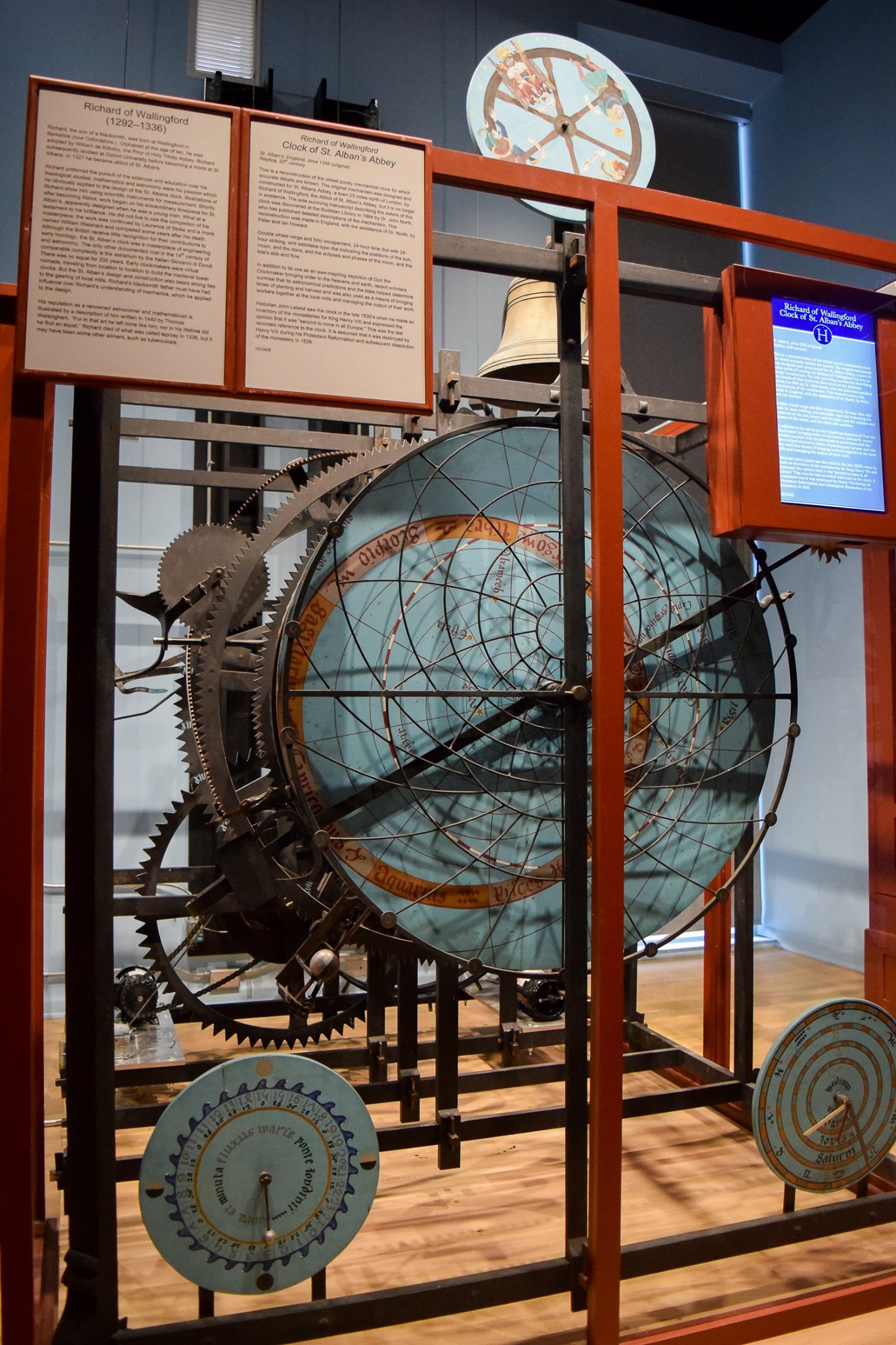
Reconstructed clock of St. Alban's Abbey, originally built circa 1356.

Richard was born, the son of a blacksmith, at Wallingford in Berkshire (now Oxfordshire) in England, in 1292. When he was orphaned he was taken to William de Kirkeby the Prior of Wallingford Priory and dedicated to the Holy Trinity. Wallingford was a dependent priory to St Albans Abbey. Richard subsequently spent six years studying at Oxford University before becoming a monk at St Albans. He later studied for nine more years at Oxford. In 1327 he became abbot of St Albans.

Richard is best known for the astronomical clock he designed, while he was abbot, which is described in the Tractatus Horologii Astronomici (1327). The clock was completed about 20 years after Richard's death by William of Walsham, but was apparently destroyed during Henry VIII's reformation and the dissolution of St Albans Abbey in 1539. His clock almost certainly was the most complex clock mechanism in existence at the time in the British Isles, and one of the most sophisticated ones anywhere. The only other clocklike mechanism of comparable complexity that is documented in the 14th century is the astrarium by Giovanni de Dondi. Richard’s clock gave the mean time in equal and unequal hours, as well as the true solar time. It also displayed the phases of the moon and showed the positions of the lunar nodes and the height of the tide at London Bridge.

Based on the 14th-century literary evidence still surviving in the 20th century, scholars of horological history have tried to build recreations of Richard of Wallingford's clock. The best known of these was built by Haward Horological and for many years was displayed at the Time Museum (now defunct) in Rockford, Illinois; it is currently on display at the Halim Time and Glass Museum in Evanston, Illinois. One was built by Eric Watson and is now in the Wallingford Museum; one built in 1988 is located at St Albans Cathedral; and one was built by Don Unwin for the Whipple Museum of the History of Science in Cambridge.

Richard suffered from what was then thought to be leprosy (though it might have been scrofula or tuberculosis) which he apparently contracted when he went to have his position, as abbot of St Albans Abbey, confirmed by the Pope at Avignon. He died at St Albans in 1336.

== Studies in astronomy and mathematics ==
Richard also designed and constructed calculation devices: a torquetum, the Rectangulus, and an equatorium, which he called Albion. The Albion could be used for astronomical calculations such as lunar, solar and planetary longitudes and could predict eclipses, and was capable of doing this without relying on a set of tables that had to be copied out. This is described in the Tractatus Albionis. He published other works on trigonometry, celestial coordinates, astrology, and various religious works.

== See also ==
- Giovanni Dondi dall'Orologio
- Su Song
- Yi Xing
