= Arp 302 =

Galaxy in the constellation Boötes

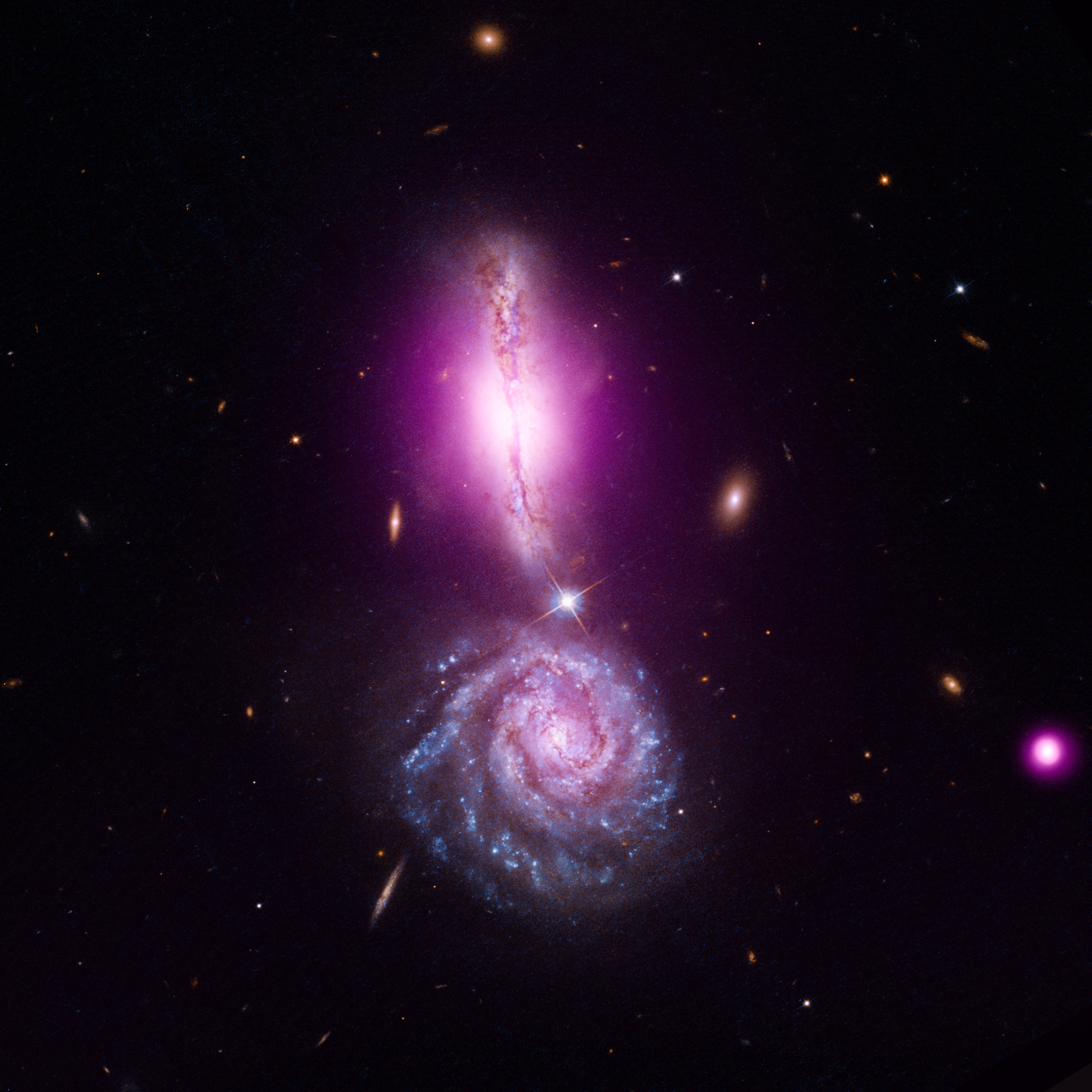
- Arp 302 consists of a pair of very gas-rich spiral galaxies in their early stages of interaction: VV 340A is seen edge-on at top, and VV 340B face-on below. Composite image of X-ray data from Chandra (purple) and optical data from Hubble (red, green, blue).

Observation data (J2000 epoch)
- Constellation: Boötes
- Right ascension: 14^{h} 56^{m} 54^{s}
- Declination: +24° 36.0′ 00″
- Redshift: 0.034505 (10166 km/s)
- Distance: 450 Mly (150 Mpc)
- Apparent magnitude (V): 11.3 (15.3 + 15.7)

Characteristics
- Type: S+S
- Apparent size (V): 1.6′ (0.6′ × 0.6′ / 0.9′ × 0.3′)

Other designations
- VV 340, IRAS 14547+2448, CGCG 1454.7+2448, APG 302, KPG 446, CGCG 134-58, IRAS F14547+2449, Arp 302, LEDA 53433 / 53432, 2MASX J14570030+2436246 / J14570066+2437026, MCG+04-35-018 / +04-35-019, UGC 9618

Arp 302 (also known as the Exclamation Point Galaxy or Exclamation Mark Galaxy) is a galaxy in the constellation Boötes. Arp 302, also known as VV 340 or UGC 9618 consists of a pair of very gas-rich spiral galaxies in their early stages of interaction. An enormous amount of infrared light is radiated by the gas from massive stars that are forming at a rate similar to the most vigorous giant star-forming regions in our own Milky Way. Arp 302 is 450 million light-years away from Earth, and is the 302nd galaxy in Arp's Atlas of Peculiar Galaxies.

== Supernova ==
One supernova has been observed in Arp 302: SN 2026ree (Type IIb, mag. 19.47) was discovered by GOTO on 1 July 2026.

== Gallery ==
Video about Arp 302/UGC 9618.
