= Rectangulus =

14th-century astronomical instrument

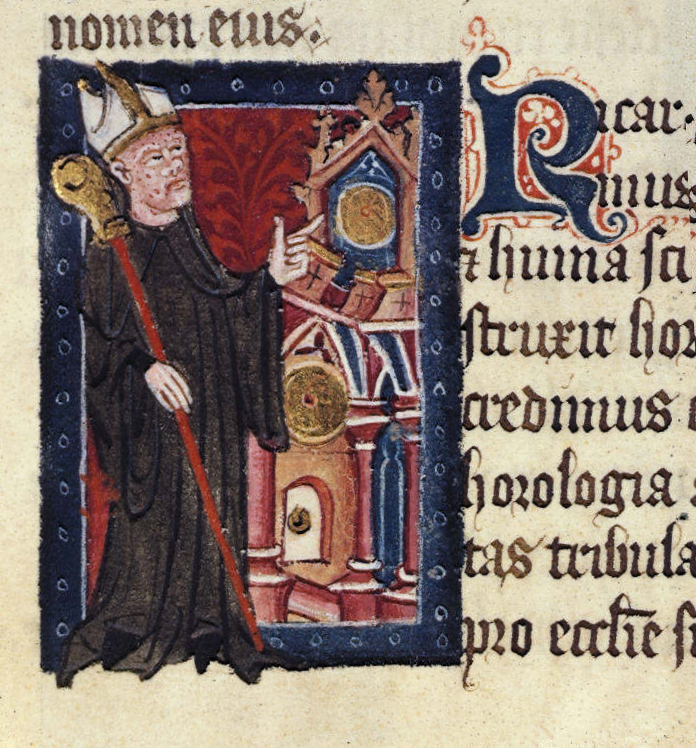
Richard of Wallingford, inventor of the rectangulus

The rectangulus is an astronomical instrument, invented by Richard of Wallingford around 1326. Dissatisfied with the limitations of existing astrolabes, Richard developed the rectangulus as an instrument for spherical trigonometry and to measure the angles between planets and other astronomical bodies. This was one of a number of instruments he created, including the Albion, a form of equatorium, and a famously complicated and expensive horologium (astronomical clock).

His Tractus Rectanguli, describing the rectangulus, was an influential text in medieval astronomy and at least thirty copies were known to survive. His Quadripartitum was the first text on spherical trigonometry to be published in Western Europe.

The rectangulus was a form of skeleton torquetum. This was a series of nested angular scales, so that measurements in azimuth and elevation could be made directly in polar coordinates, relative to the ecliptic. Conversion from these coordinates though was difficult, involving what was the leading mathematics of the day. The rectangulus was an analogue computing device to simplify this: instead of measuring in angular measurements it could resolve the angles to Cartesian components directly. This then simplified the further calculations.

The rectangulus was constructed as a brass pillar with a number of linear scales hinged above it. Pinhole sights on the upper arm allowed it to be pointed accurately at the astronomical target. Plumb bob lines descended from the scales above and intersected with linear scales marked on the horizontal scales below. These allowed measures to be read, not as angles, but as trigonometric ratios.

To celebrate the 600th anniversary of the Rectangulus in 1926 a replica was constructed. This is now in the History of Science Museum, Oxford.
