= John of Wallingford =

John of Wallingford may refer to:

- John of Wallingford (d. 1214), English monk and abbot of St. Albans Abbey
- John of Wallingford (d. 1258), English monk and chronicler
