= Wallingford =

Wallingford may refer to:

== People ==
=== Surname ===
- Darcy Wallingford (fl. 1980s), Canadian swimmer
- Jesse Wallingford (1872–1944), British sport shooter and New Zealand army officer
- Sidney Wallingford (1898–1978), British-born aviator and New Zealand air force officer
- Wayne Wallingford (born 1946), American politician in Missouri

=== Given name ===
- Wallingford Riegger (1885–1961), American modernist composer and pianist
- Wally Mendelson (1872–1902), New Zealand athlete and lawyer

=== Middle name ===
- Frederick W. Whitridge (1852–1916), American industrialist and railway president

=== Anglo-Norman figures ===
- Brian of Wallingford (12th century), also known as Brian Fitz Count, Anglo-Norman noble
- Ealdgyth of Wallingford (11th century), wife of Robert D'Oyly
- John of Wallingford (d. 1214), English monk and abbot of St. Albans abbey
- John of Wallingford (d. 1258), English monk and chronicler
- Miles of Wallingford, also known as Miles Crispin (died 1107), wealthy Norman landowner
- Richard of Wallingford (1292–1336), English mathematician and astronomer
- Richard of Wallingford (constable) (14th century), constable of Wallingford Castle and landowner in St Albans
- William of Wallingford (died 1492), Benedictine monk

=== Fictional characters ===
- Get-Rich-Quick Wallingford, nickname of J. Rufus Wallingford, a fictional con man created by George Randolph Chester c. 1907
- Langley Wallingford, a fictional character from the American soap opera All My Children
- Miles Wallingford, title character of an 1844 nautical novel written by James Fenimore Cooper

== Places ==
=== United Kingdom ===
- Wallingford, Oxfordshire, England, a town
  - Wallingford Castle, a ruined castle in the town
  - Wallingford railway station (England), located here

==== Administrative units ====
- Municipal Borough of Wallingford, 1836–1919
- Wallingford (UK Parliament constituency), 1295–1885
- Wallingford Rural District, 1894–1974

=== United States ===
- Wallingford, Connecticut, a town
  - Wallingford station (Connecticut), a railway station located here
- Wallingford, Iowa, a city
- Wallingford, Kentucky, an unincorporated community
- Wallingford, Pennsylvania, an unincorporated community
  - Wallingford station (SEPTA), a SEPTA Regional Rail station located here
- Wallingford, Seattle, a neighborhood of the city of Seattle, Washington
- Wallingford, Vermont, a town
  - Wallingford (CDP), Vermont, a census-designated place in the town
