= Wallingford station =

Wallingford station may refer to:

- Wallingford station (Connecticut), an Amtrak station in Wallingford, Connecticut, USA
- Wallingford station (SEPTA), a SEPTA Regional Rail station in Wallingford, Pennsylvania, USA
- Wallingford railway station (England), Wallingford, Oxfordshire, England

== See also ==
- Wallingford (disambiguation)
