= John of Wallingford (d. 1258) =

Benedictine monk

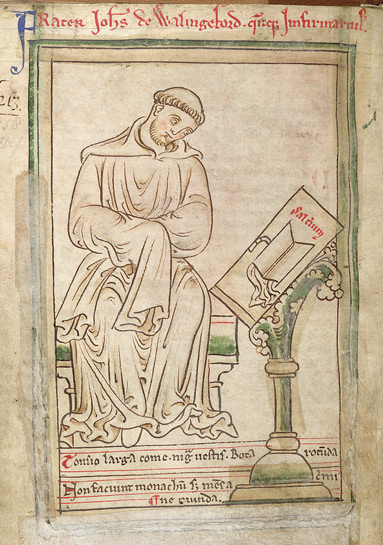
Drawing of John of Wallingford by Matthew Paris, ca. 1255. (British Library Cotton MS Julius D VII, f.42v)

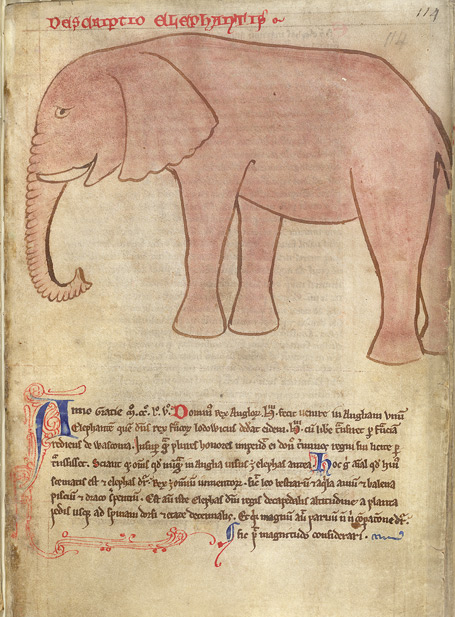
John of Wallingford's "Description of the Elephant", apparently copied from Matthew Paris's drawing of the elephant given to Henry III. (British Library Cotton MS Julius D VII, f.114r)

John of Wallingford (died 1258) was a Benedictine monk at the Abbey of St Albans, who served as the abbey's infirmarer at some time between c.1246-7 and his death in 1258. He is now mostly known through a manuscript containing a miscellaneous collection of material, mostly written up by Wallingford from various works by his contemporary at the abbey Matthew Paris, which survives as British Library Cotton MS Julius D VII. This manuscript includes the so-called Chronica Joannis Wallingford or Chronicle of John of Wallingford.

Towards the end of the manuscript, accompanying three pages of obituaries of St. Albans monks taken from Paris, are statements indicating that he became a monk on 9 October 1231 (presumably at Wallingford Priory which was a cell of St Albans), and moved to St Albans itself between June 1246 and February 1247. It is also known that he was infirmarer, in charge of the infirmary at the abbey, until at least 1253, and that in about 1257 he moved again to Wymondham Abbey in Norfolk, another cell of St Albans. A final note, in another hand, records that he died there on 14 August 1258.

Amongst a miscellany of items, including an outline chronicle for a history of Britain, and a tide table for predicting "flod at London brigge" (i.e. the time of high tide at London Bridge), that is credited with being the earliest extant such tide table in Europe, other items in the manuscript include a drawing of Wallingford by Paris, a draft for a map of Britain by Paris to which Wallingford has added some further place-names, and a copy by Wallingford of Matthew Paris's picture of King Henry III's elephant.

== The so-called Chronica Joannis Wallingford ==
Folios 10r to 33v of the manuscript are written in a different hand, and contain a chronicle of English history from the legendary Brutus to Cnut (d. 1035) – though more of it is in fact devoted to hagiographies of English saints than to history. The work shares many sources with Roger of Wendover's Flores Historiarum, presumably compiled from the same library at the same time; but its paraphrasing is different, and sometimes it is much more extensive in its extracts. In the past this anonymous chronicle has sometimes been attributed to the above John of Wallingford who was a contemporary of Matthew Paris, including in its first printed edition, and sometimes to his namesake, the John of Wallingford who was abbot of St Albans from 1195 to 1214. However it is now believed to have been written by an unknown monk at some point after Abbot John's time, but before John the infirmarer obtained the manuscript.

Richard Vaughan produced a critical edition of the work.

A heavily abridged extract from the chronicle had previously been printed by Thomas Gale in 1691 in his Historiæ Britannicæ Saxonicæ Anglo-Danicæ Scriptores XV. An English translation by Joseph Stevenson was published in 1854.

Stevenson found that:

There are few histories more perplexing than the production of this unknown chronicler which we have here translated. The tone of confidence with which he questions the statements of others (upon points of chronology as well as history), and advances his own conclusions, is calculated at first to secure deference to his authority. A more accurate investigation, however, shows us that the greater number of his assertions must be received with caution unless supported by collateral evidence. Several of them have been pointed out in the foot-notes, but their number might yet further be extended.

William Hunt, writing for the Dictionary of National Biography in 1899, considered that

The author evidently used several excellent authorities, such as Bede, the Saxon priest's Life of Dunstan, Florence of Worcester, and the like; but, though he makes some attempts at comparison and criticism, has inserted so many exaggerations and misconceptions apparently current in his own time, and has further so strangely confused the results of his reading, that his production is historically worthless.

The chronicle writer is nonetheless still occasionally quoted, for example his remark preceding his account of the St. Brice's Day massacre of the Danes in 1002 during the reign of Ethelred the Unready is a common historical misconception. He asserted that

the Danes, thanks to their habit of combing their hair every day, of bathing every Saturday and regularly changing their clothes, were able to undermine the virtue of married women and even seduce the daughters of nobles to be their mistresses.
