= Judensau relief at the city church, Wittenberg =

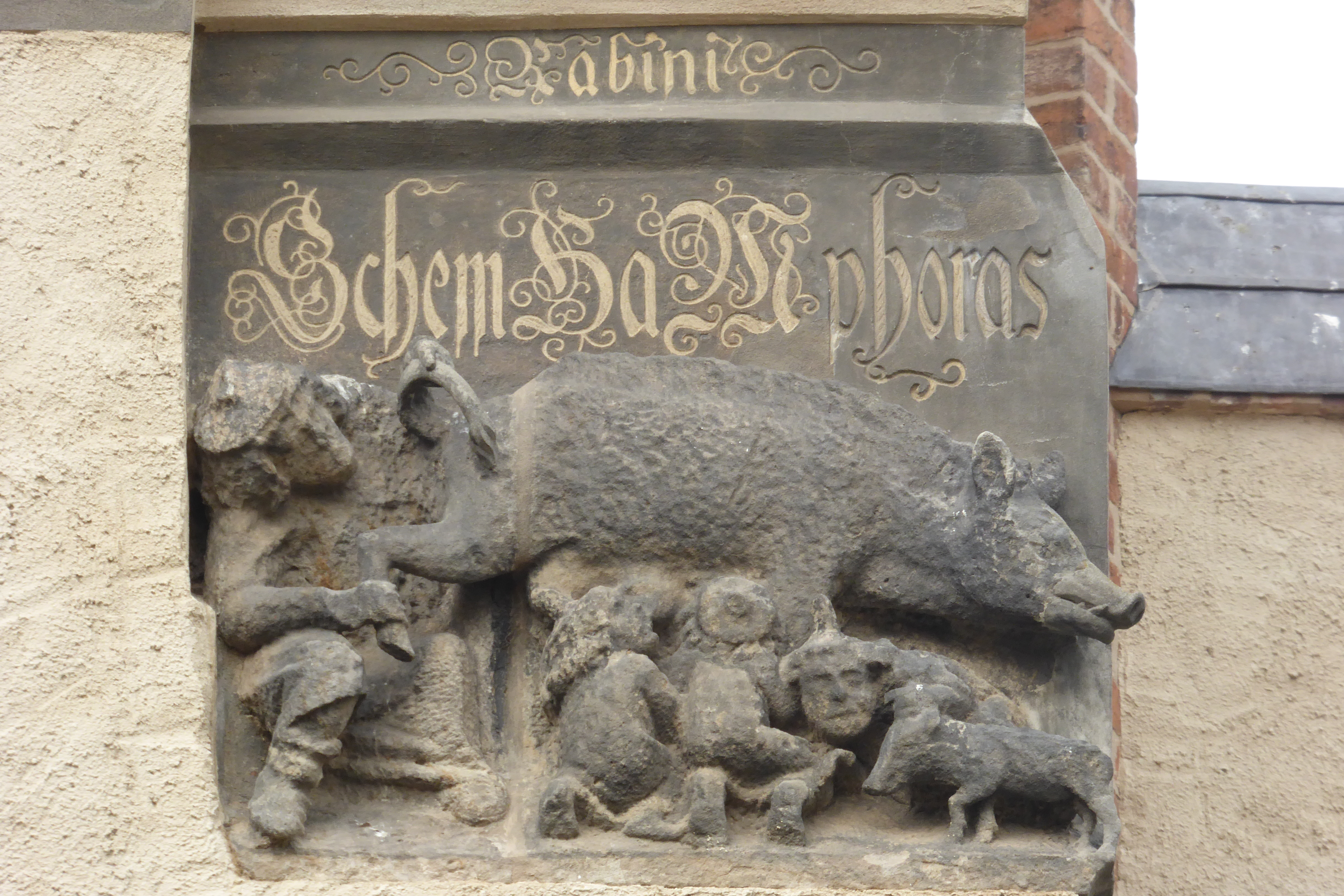
The Judensau relief on the southeast corner of the Stadtkirche, Wittenberg

Judensau relief at the city church, Wittenberg is a medieval anti‑Jewish stone carving created around 1290. It depicts figures marked as Jews in obscene contact with a female pig, intended to warn Christians against alleged Jewish behavior and to slander Judaism. It is one of 47 surviving examples of a Judensau ("Jew‑sow") sculpture that appeared in churches across the German-speaking lands from the 13th century and illustrates medieval anti‑Jewish sentiment in Christianity.

In 1543, Martin Luther publicized this relief in his antisemitic tract Von Schem Hamphoras, mocking the Hebrew term Shem HaMephorash (the ineffable name of God). Around 1570, the sculpture was inscribed with the caption Rabini Schem HaMphoras (“Rabbi’s Shem HaMephorash”), earning it the nickname "Luther's pig" or Luthersau.

Since 1988, a memorial plaque has been placed beneath the relief, acknowledging Christian antisemitism as a precursor to the Holocaust. From 2016 onwards, several individuals and groups have demanded the relief be removed or relocated to a museum, but legal attempts have repeatedly failed. In 2022, Germany’s Federal Court of Justice ruled that the sculpture may remain on the church, as long as the church provides sufficient historical context.

== Description ==
The relief portrays a realistically rendered sow facing right, accompanied by four figures identified as Jews based on their pointed hats and robes. Two kneel and suckle from the sow’s teats, a third holds a piglet’s ear, and the fourth, a large figure, lifts the pig’s tail and peers into its anus.

The Jewish hats resemble those mandated by the Fourth Lateran Council in 1215 to distinguish Jews from Christians in medieval towns. Similar hats appear in sculptures at Naumburg Cathedral and in fountains at Bad Wimpfen.

The relief measures approximately 150 cm wide, 80 cm high, and 25 cm deep. The pig’s fur and bodily form are rendered with attention to detail, indicating close observation of real animals.

== Historical context ==
The Stadtkirche was constructed around 1280–1295. The relief was not part of the original plans and was likely added around 1290. The sandstone was imported, likely from the Elbe valley near Meissen.

The relief may originally have been located on the north façade, near the former Jewish quarter (Judengasse), where it would have been visible only to Christians.

Although some claims cite Jewish expulsion from Wittenberg in 1304 or 1440, records confirm Jewish presence in the town until 1536, when Jews were formally expelled.

== Reformation and Luther ==
During the Reformation, Martin Luther gave new meaning to the sculpture in his 1543 tract Von Schem Hamphoras. There he derides Jews and refers to the relief as physical evidence of their alleged impurity.

The caption “Rabini Schem HaMphoras” was added below the relief around 1570, tying the image explicitly to Luther’s text.

== Modern Controversy ==
A memorial plaque was installed in 1988, reading:

"In the name of Jesus Christ, the Church distances itself from hatred of the Jews and acknowledges its guilt. We mourn the victims of the Holocaust."

From 2016, petitions and public calls for removal increased. Jewish leader Richard Harvey and others campaigned online.

Michael Düllmann, a Jewish resident of Wittenberg, filed a legal complaint seeking removal. His suit was dismissed in 2020 by local and appellate courts. In 2022, the Federal Court of Justice upheld the decision, ruling that historical framing by the church was sufficient.

A complaint was submitted to the European Court of Human Rights in 2024, arguing that the relief violates human dignity and the European Convention on Human Rights.

== Current Status ==
As of 2024, the Evangelical Church plans to create a “learning site” around the relief, including educational displays, but no removal or relocation is currently planned.

== Cultural Significance ==
The Wittenberg relief, among the oldest surviving Judensau sculptures, remains a highly visible symbol of Christian antisemitism. It exemplifies how religious imagery can serve as propaganda and raises ongoing debates about how to deal with shameful historical relics in public spaces.
