= Flores Historiarum =

Medieval English chronicles

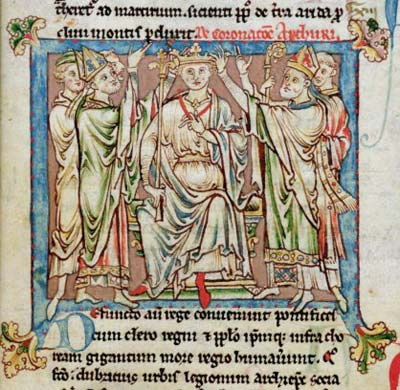
King Arthur – miniature from the Chetham MS 6712 Flores Historiarum, by or after Matthew Paris

The Flores Historiarum (Flowers of History) is the name of two different (though related) Latin chronicles by medieval English historians that were created in the 13th century, associated originally with the Abbey of St Albans.

== Wendover's Flores Historiarum ==
The first Flores Historiarum was created by St Albans writer, Roger of Wendover, who carried his chronology from the Creation up to 1235, the year before his death. Roger claims in his preface to have selected "from the books of catholic writers worthy of credit, just as flowers of various colours are gathered from various fields." Hence he also called his work Flores Historiarum. However, like most chronicles, it is now valued not so much for what was culled from previous writers, as for its full and lively narrative of contemporary events from 1215 to 1235, including the signing of Magna Carta by King John at Runnymede.

The book has survived in one thirteenth-century manuscript in the Bodleian Library in Oxford (MS Douce 207), a mutilated 14th-century copy in the British Library in London (Cotton MS Otho B V), and in the version adapted by Matthew Paris which forms the first part of his Chronica Majora (ed. Henry Richards Luard, Rolls Series, seven volumes).

The sources brought together in the Flores include Bede, Geoffrey of Monmouth, Sigebert of Gembloux, Florence of Worcester, Simeon of Durham, William of Malmesbury, Henry of Huntingdon, Robert de Monte, William of Tyre, Ralph de Diceto, Benedictus Abbas, Roger of Hoveden and Ralph of Coggeshall (to 1194). A detailed list is given by Luard, who in his running text also marks up the apparent source of each section. From 1201 and through the reign of King John it draws on a source common between it and the Annales Sancti Edmundi later also used by John de Taxster, and also some annals added to the St. Albans copy of Diceto.

The date of creation of the earliest nucleus of the compilation has been disputed. The manuscript in the Bodleian Library, written out ca. 1300, contains a marginal note against the annal for 1188 that reads "up to here in Abbot John's chronicle book". Luard took this to mean that there had existed a core of the Flores going up to 1188, the creation of which had been supervised by John of Wallingford at some point during his tenure as abbot of St Albans between 1195 and 1214. On the other hand, 1188 is also when the first manuscript of Matthew Paris's Chronica Majora concludes, with the end of the reign of Henry II, so an alternative view is that this may have been the chronicle book referred to, which may have been in the possession of a later Abbot John at the turn of the 14th century when the manuscript was written out.

Considering the text itself, some of the earlier parts of the work draw heavily on the Historia scholastica (ca. 1173) of Petrus Comestor, a copy of which was not introduced into the monastery until John of Wallingford's abbacy. (Though Luard elsewhere notes some differences between the treatment of Comestor and that of some other writers). The work of Diceto, which is used throughout the Flores but especially after 1066, was also not copied for the Abbey until 1204. In its final form the annal for 1179 contains a reference to the Lateran Council of 1215, and Vaughan finds that all of the extant manuscripts ultimately descend from a common ancestral exemplar that can be no earlier than 1228. However, Vaughan does not rule out the possibility that there might have been some earlier compilation used by Wendover, and finds some evidence for such a compilation, extending perhaps to 1066.

== Paris's Flores Historiarum, and its continuation ==
The second and more widely distributed Flores Historiarum runs from the creation to 1326 (although some of the earlier manuscripts end at 1306). It was compiled by various persons and quickly acquired contemporary popularity, for it was continued by many hands in many manuscript traditions. Among twenty surviving manuscripts are those compiled at St Benet Holme, Norfolk, continued at Tintern Abbey (Royal Mss 14.c.6); at Norwich (Cottonian Claudius E 8); Rochester (Cottonian Nero D 2); St Paul's, London (Lambeth Mss 1106); St Mary's, Southwark (Bodleian Library, Rawlinson Mss B 177); and at St Augustine's, Canterbury (Harley MS 641).

It was written originally at St Albans Abbey and later at Westminster Abbey. The earliest manuscript, the basis for all the various continuations, is conserved in Chetham's Library, Manchester. This manuscript was carried down to 1265, with brief notes and emendations in the hand of Matthew Paris. A continuation carried the chronicle down to 1306; the continuation from 1306 to 1325/26 was compiled at Westminster by Robert of Reading (d. 1325) and another Westminster monk.

The second Flores Historiarum was for many years attributed to a "Matthew of Westminster," who Henry Richards Luard demonstrated was actually Matthew Paris.

The Flores Historiarum is markedly opposed to Robert the Bruce. According to the chronicle, after Bruce had had himself crowned king of Scots in the spring of 1306, Lady Elisabeth Bruce tells her husband: "I reckon that you are a summer king; perhaps you won't be a winter one".

== Editions ==
Wendover's Flores Historiarum

- (in Latin) Henry Coxe (1841–44): vol 1, vol 2, vol 3, vol 4, Appendix
- John Allen Giles (1849): vol 1, vol 2
- (in Latin) Henry Gay Hewlett, for the Rolls series, (1886–89): vol 1, vol 2, vol 3

13th–14th century Flores Historiarum

- (in Latin) Matthew Parker, Archbishop of Canterbury, from a single manuscript (1567).
- (in Latin) Thomas Marsh, (1570): vol
- C. D. Yonge (2 vols, London, 1853): vol 1 vol 2
- (in Latin) Henry Richards Luard, for the Rolls series, (3 vols, London, 1890): vol 1, vol 2, vol 3
