= Fourth Council of the Lateran =

1215 encumenical council

Fourth Council of the Lateran (Lateran IV)
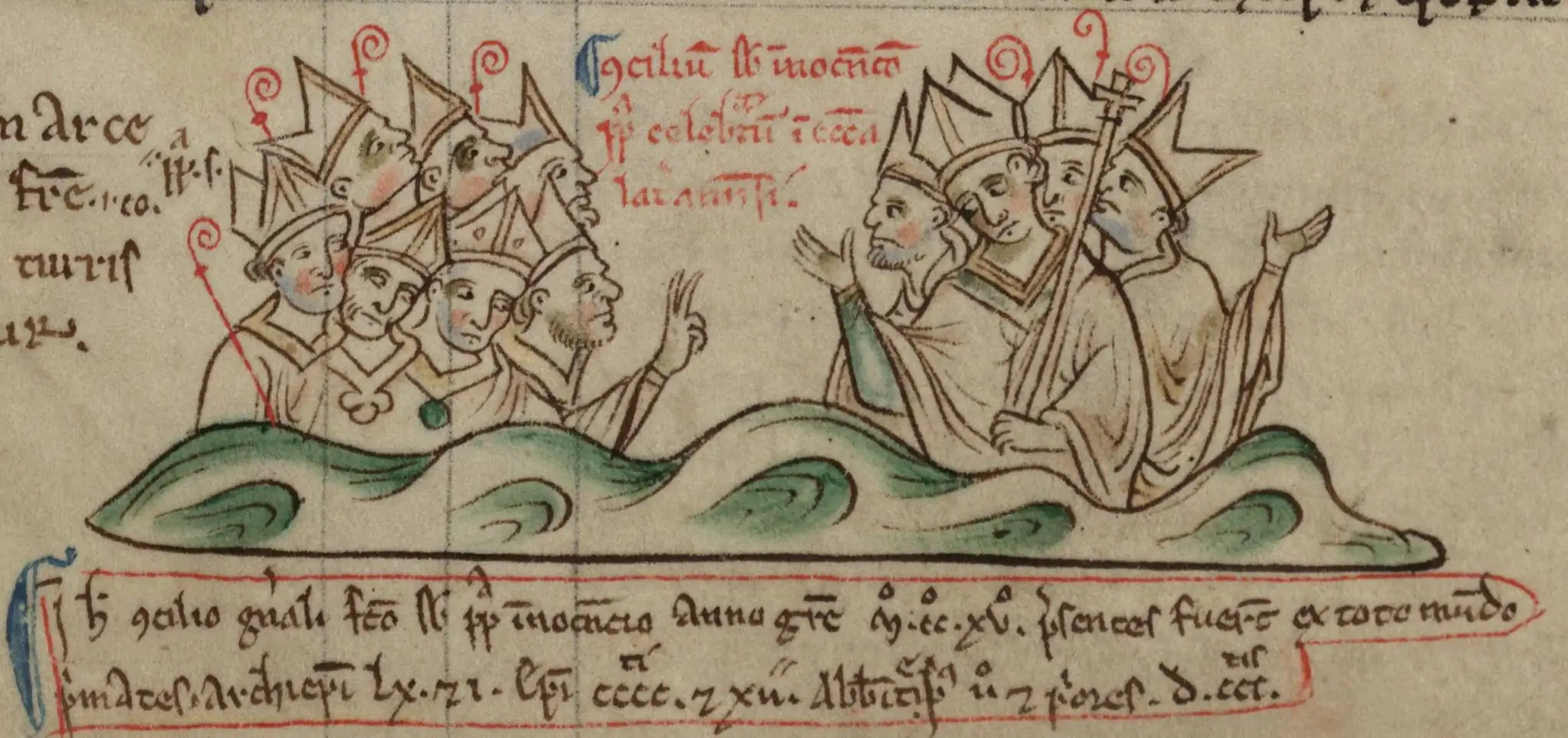
- Matthew Paris' illustration in the Chronica Maiora of the Fourth Lateran Council
- Date: 1215
- Accepted by: Catholic Church
- Previous council: Third Council of the Lateran
- Next council: First Council of Lyon
- Convoked by: Pope Innocent III
- President: Pope Innocent III
- Topics: Crusading, ecclesiastical reform, heresy, Islam, Judaism, laity
- Documents and statements: 71 papal decrees

The Fourth Council of the Lateran or Lateran IV was convoked by Pope Innocent III in April 1213 and opened at the Lateran Palace in Rome on 11 November 1215. Due to the great length of time between the council's convocation and its meeting, many bishops had the opportunity to attend this council, which is considered by the Catholic Church to be the twelfth ecumenical council.

The council addressed a number of issues, including the sacraments, the role of the laity, the treatment of Jews and heretics, and the organization of the church. The decree mandating annual confession has been called "perhaps the most important legislative act in the history of the church."

In the case of Jews and Muslims, this included compelling them to wear distinctive badges to prevent social contact "through error".

== Background ==
Innocent III first mooted organizing an ecumenical council in November 1199. In his letter titled Vineam Domini, dated 19 April 1213, the Pope writes of the urgent need to recover the Holy Land and reform the Church. The letter, which also served as a summons to an ecumenical council, was included alongside the Pope's papal bull Quia maior. In preparing for the council, the Pope spearheaded the extensive refurbishment of the old St. Peter's Basilica, which he designated as the "centrepiece for display and decoration" during the council. The lunette of the main door leading to the tomb of St. Peter had engravings of Old Testament prophets and 24 bishops, alongside the messages, "Feed your Sheep" and "This is the Door of the Sheep".

The measures against the Jews were the culmination of hostility during Innocent's reign as Pope, itself informed by a background of greater hostility to the Jews generated in part by the Crusades. Innocent for example waged a novel campaign against the Talmud as part of the campaign against heresy, claiming that the Talmud was an invention of the Rabbis, and the Jews should be restricted to using Biblical texts for their faith. This was the first time that the Catholic church had tried to directly regulate the practice of Judaism.

== Proceedings ==
Pope Innocent III deliberately chose for the Fourth Council to meet in November, during which there were numerous feast days. A preliminary legal session took place on 4 November, while the opening ceremony of the council was held on St. Martin's Day and began with a private morning Mass. Afterwards, at the start of the first plenary session in the Lateran Palace, the Pope led the singing of "Veni Creator Spiritus" and preached about Jesus' words to his disciples at the Last Supper, quoting from Luke 22. In his next two sermons, one on the need to recover the Holy Land and the other on dealing with heretics, the Pope was joined on stage by Raoul of Mérencourt and Thedisius of Agde respectively.

On 14 November, there were violent scenes between the partisans of Simon de Montfort among the French bishops and those of the Count of Toulouse. Raymond VI of Toulouse, his son (afterwards Raymond VII), and Raymond-Roger of Foix attended the council to dispute the threatened confiscation of their territories; Bishop Foulques and Guy de Montfort (brother of Simon de Montfort) argued in favour of the confiscation. All of Raymond VI's lands were confiscated, save Provence, which was kept in trust to be restored to Raymond VII. Pierre-Bermond of Sauve's claim to Toulouse was rejected and Toulouse was awarded to de Montfort, while the lordship of Melgueil was separated from Toulouse and entrusted to the bishops of Maguelonne.

The next day, in a ceremony attended by many council participants, the Pope consecrated the Basilica of Santa Maria in Trastevere, which had been rebuilt by Callixtus II. Four days later, the anniversary celebration at St. Peter's Basilica brought together such a large gathering that the Pope himself had trouble entering the premises.

The second plenary session was held on 20 November; the Pope was scheduled to preach about church reform, but proceedings were disrupted by bishops who opposed the designation of Frederick II as Holy Roman Emperor. The council concluded on 30 November, Saint Andrew's Day, during which the Pope preached on the Nicene Creed and concluded his remarks by raising up a relic of the True Cross. The archbishop of Mainz Siegfried II of Eppstein attempted to interrupt the speech, although he complied with the Pope's raising of his hand—a command to stay silent.

== Outcomes ==
Lateran IV had three objectives: crusading, Church reform, and combating heresy. The seventy-one Lateran canons, which were not debated, were only formally adopted on the last day of the council; according to Anne J. Duggan, the "scholarly consensus" is that they were drafted by Innocent III himself. They cover a range of themes including Church reform and elections, taxation, matrimony, tithing, simony, and Judaism. After being recorded in the papal registers, the canons were quickly circulated in law schools. Effective application of the decrees varied according to local conditions and customs.

=== Joachimism ===
The Council condemned the teaching of the Joachimites, which was a mystical tendency of Franciscans who believed the church was entering a new "era of the Holy Spirit" where the established church would be replaced by (or process into) an egalitarian and utopian monastic rule.

As part of this, the Council stated that "between creator and creature there can be noted no similarity so great that a greater dissimilarity cannot be seen between them," which became the basis of much Catholic theology, notable of the analogia entis.

=== Minorities ===
While the precise application and levels of conformity to Lateran IV were variable, some historians claim that it created a wide range of legal measures with long term repercussions, which were used to persecute minorities and helped usher in a specifically intolerant kind of European society, or as historian R. I. Moore defines it, a "persecuting society". These measures applied with vigour first to heretics, and then increasingly to other minorities, such as Jews and lepers. In the case of Jews, antisemitism had been rising since the Crusades in different parts of Europe, and the measures of Lateran IV gave the legal means to implement active systemic persecution, such as physical separation of Jews and Christians, enforced through Jews being obliged to wear distinctive badges or clothing.

The Council mandated that Jews separate and distinguish themselves, in order to "protect" Christians from their influence.

In some provinces a difference in dress distinguishes the Jews or Saracens from the Christians, but in certain others such a confusion has grown up that they cannot be distinguished by any difference. Thus it happens at times that through error Christians have relations with the women of Jews or Saracens, and Jews and Saracens with Christian women. Therefore, that they may not, under pretext of error of this sort, excuse themselves in the future for the excesses of such prohibited intercourse, we decree that such Jews and Saracens of both sexes in every Christian province and at all times shall be marked off in the eyes of the public from other peoples through the character of their dress. Particularly, since it may be read in the writings of Moses [Numbers 15:37–41], that this very law has been enjoined upon them.

=== Records and implementation ===
While the proceedings were not officially recorded, unlike in previous councils, evidence of the events have been found in various manuscripts by observers of the council. The Chronica Majora by Matthew Paris contains a line drawing of one of the sessions at the council which his abbot William of St Albans had personally attended. An extensive eyewitness account by an anonymous German cleric was copied into a manuscript that was published in 1964, in commemoration of the Second Vatican Council, and is now housed at the University of Giessen.

Dissemination of the Canons themselves was often patchy and incomplete, as it relied on handwritten records kept by local bishops, while it is unclear if the Papacy ever provided official copies. Local adaptations of the Canons could reflect disagreements or differences of priorities, and the incompleteness of the transmission of the canons was recognised as a significant problem by the Papacy. Implementation of the council's reforms was included within the Canons, with instructions that local councils should be held in order to create plans for their adoption. Provinces held councils to instruct Bishops to hold local synods, however the evidence suggests that this mechanism did not result in Bishops holding meetings and organising reforms in the manner intended.

== Legacy ==
Henry of Segusio likened the council to the "four great councils of antiquity". Lateran IV is sometimes referred to as the "Great Council of the Lateran" due to the presence of 404 or 412 bishops (including 71 cardinals and archbishops) and over 800 abbots and priors representing some eighty ecclesiastical provinces, together with 23 Latin-speaking prelates from the Eastern Orthodox Church and representatives of several monarchs, including Frederick II of Sicily, Holy Roman Emperor Otto IV, the Latin Emperor of Constantinople, John, King of England, Andrew II of Hungary, Philip II of France, and the kings of Aragon, Cyprus, and Jerusalem. This made it the largest ecumenical council between the Council of Chalcedon and the Second Vatican Council; Anne J. Duggan writes that "it was the largest, most representative, and most influential council assembled under papal leadership before the end of the fourteenth century." According to F. Donald Logan, "the Fourth Lateran Council was the most important general council of the church in the Middle Ages", whose effects "were felt for centuries."

== Canons ==
Canons of Lateran IV
Canon number	Title	English	Description
Canon 1	De fide catholica	On the catholic faith	Infallibly defined the teaching of the Catholic Church on transubstantiation, the doctrine which describes in precise scholastic language the transformation by which the bread and wine offered in the sacrament of the Eucharist becomes the actual blood and body of Christ.
Canon 2	De errore abbatis Ioachim	On the error of abbot Joachim	Condemnation of the doctrines of Joachim of Fiore and Amalric of Bena.
Canon 3	De haereticis	On heretics	Procedure and penalties against heretics and their protectors. If those suspected of heresy should neglect to prove themselves innocent, they are excommunicated. If they continue in the excommunication for twelve months they are to be condemned as heretics. Princes are to swear that they will banish all whom the church points out as heretics.
Canon 4	De superbia Graecorum contra Latinos	On the pride of Greeks towards Latins	Exhortation to the Greeks to reunite with the Roman Church.
Canon 5	De dignitate patriarcharum	On the dignity of patriarchs	Proclamation of the papal primacy recognized by all antiquity. After the pope, primacy is attributed to the patriarchs in the following order: Constantinople, Alexandria, Antioch, and Jerusalem.
Canon 6	De conciliis provincialibus	On provincial councils	Provincial councils must be held annually for the reform of morals, especially those of the clergy. This was to ensure that the canons adopted would be implemented.
Canon 7	De correctione excessuum	On the conviction of offences	Sets down the responsibility of the bishops for the reform of their subjects.
Canon 8	De inquisitionibus	On inquests	Procedure in regard to accusations against ecclesiastics.
Canon 9	De diversis ritibus in eadem fide	On different rites within the same faith	Celebration of public worship in places where the inhabitants belong to nations following different rites.
Canon 10	De praedicatoribus instituendis	On appointing preachers	Ordered the appointment of preachers and penitentiaries to assist in the discharge of the episcopal functions of preaching and penance.
Canon 11	De magistris scholasticis	On schoolmasters	The decree of 1179, about a school in each cathedral having been entirely ignored, was re-enacted, and a lectureship in theology ordered to be founded in every cathedral.
Canon 12	De communibus capitulis monachorum	On general chapters of monks	Abbots and priors are to hold their general chapter every three years.
Canon 13	De novis religionibus prohibitis	On the prohibition against new religious orders	Forbade the establishment of new religious orders.
Canon 14	De incontinentia clericorum punienda	On punishing clerical incontinences	Set out guidelines for punishing incontinence.
Canon 15	De arcenda ebrietate clericorum	On preventing drunkenness among the clergy	Prohibited both drunkenness and the hunting of birds and dogs.
Canon 16	De indumentis clericorum	On the dress of clerics	Prescribed dressing for clergy members—including a ban on embroidered or pointed shoes—and prohibited gambling and spectating theatrical performances.
Canon 17	De comessationibus praelatorum et negligentia eorum super diviniis officiis	On prelates' feasts and their negligence at divine services	Admonished clerics who excessively engaged in non-religious activities while infrequently attending mass.
Canon 18	De indicio sanguinis et duelli clericis interdicto	On sentences involving either the shedding of blood or a duel being forbidden to clerics	Clerics may neither pronounce nor execute a sentence of death. Nor may they act as judges in extreme criminal cases, or take part in matters connected with judicial tests and trials by ordeal.
Canon 19	Ne ecclesiae mundanis suppellectilibus exponantur	That profane objects may not be introduced into churches	Household goods must not be stored in churches unless there be an urgent necessity. Churches, church vessels, and the like must be kept clean.
Canon 20	De chrismate et eucharistia sub sera conservanda	On keeping the chrism and the eucharist under lock and key	Ordering that the chrism and the Eucharist to be kept under lock and key, with a three-month suspension for leaving it out carelessly, and worse if "anything unspeakable" were to happen to it.
Canon 21	De confessione facienda et non revelanda a sacerdote et saltem in pascha communicando	On confession being made, and not revealed by the priest, and on communicating at least at Easter	Introduced the mandate "Omnis utriusque sexus", which commands every Christian who has reached the years of discretion to confess all his, or her, sins at least once a year to their own priest. This canon did no more than confirm earlier legislation and custom (of the previous century), although it is sometimes incorrectly quoted as commanding the use of sacramental confession for the first time.
Canon 22	Quod infirmi prius provideant animae quam corpori	That the sick should provide for the soul before the body	Before prescribing medicine for the sick, physicians shall be bound under pain of exclusion from the church, to exhort their patients to call in a priest, and thus provide for their spiritual welfare.
Canon 23	Quod ecclesia cathedralis vel regularis ultra tres menses non vacet	That a cathedral church or a church of the regular clergy is not to remain vacant for more than three months	Mandated that a church is not to be without a prelate for more than three months.
Canon 24	De electione facienda per scrutinium vel compromissum	On making an election by ballot or by agreement	Mandated that pastors are to be either elected or chosen by a committee acting on behalf of the congregation.
Canon 25	Quod electio facta per saecularem potestatem non valeat	That the choice made by secular power is not valid	Specified that spiritual leaders may not be selected by non-Christians.
Canon 26	De poema indigue confirmantis electionem	On the penalty for improperly confirming an election	Laid out the punishments for not adhering to electoral guidelines.
Canon 27	De instructione ordinandorum	On the instruction of ordinands	Stressed the need for bishops to properly guide their disciples and not ordain the "ignorant and unformed".
Canon 28	Quod compellantur cedere qui postulaverunt licentiam cedendi	That those who have asked for permission to resign are to be compelled to do so	Allowed members of the clergy to resign, with the caveat that their resignations would be irreversible.
Canon 29	Quod nullus babeat duo beneficia cum cura annexa	That nobody may hold two benefices with the cure of souls attached	Forbade the holding of several ecclesiastical offices at any given time.
Canon 30	De idoneitate instituendorum in ecclesiis	On the suitability of those instituted to churches	Forbade "unworthy persons" from working in churches.
Canon 31	De filiis canonicorum non instituendis cum patribus	On not instituting the sons of canons with their fathers	Prohibited clergymen from having their sons succeed them.
Canon 32	Ut patroni compententem portionem dimittant clericis	That patrons shall leave a suitable portion to clerics	Ruled that priests are entitled to a "fitting portion from the revenues of the church".
Canon 33	De procurationibus non accipiendis sine visitatione	On not receiving procurations without a visitation being made	Dictated that bishops may only expect to be reasonably remunerated when visiting churches.
Canon 34	De subditis non gravandis sub praetextu servitii alicuius	On not burdening subjects under the pretext of some service	Forbade prelates from charging for superfluous services.
Canon 35	De causa appellationis exprimenda	On stating the grounds for an appeal	Defendants must not appeal without good cause before sentence is given; if they do, they are to be charged expenses.
Canon 36	Quod iudex possit interlocutoriam et comminatoriam sententiam revocare	That a judge can revoke an interlocutory and a comminatory sentence	Judges may revoke comminatory and interlocutory sentences and proceed with the case.
Canon 37	De litteris non impetrandis ultra duas diaetas et sine specialis mandato	On not procuring letters which entail more than two days' journey and are without a special mandate	Declared that plaintiffs may not impede trials by calling on faraway witnesses, unless the defendant agrees to it.
Canon 38	De scribendis actis, ut probari possint	On writing acts so that they can be proved	Stipulated that trial proceedings must be recorded in writing.
Canon 39	De restitutione danda contra possessorem, quae non rapuit ipse	On granting restitution against a person in possession who was not the robber	Ruled that stolen goods have to be returned to their original owner.
Canon 40	De vera possessione	On true possession	Ruled that plaintiffs still have rightful ownership of goods withheld from them for more than a year.
Canon 41	De continuatione bonae fidei in omni praescriptione	On continuing good faith in every prescription	Declared that all prescriptions have to be made in good faith.
Canon 42	De saeculari iustitia	On secular justice	Stressed that religious law should not interfere with secular law, and vice versa.
Canon 43	Ne sine causa clericus fidelitatem laico faciat	On a cleric not doing fealty to a layman without good reason	Clerics should not take oaths of fealty to laymen without lawful cause.
Canon 44	Quod constitutiones principum non praeiudicent ecclesiis	That the ordinances of princes should not be prejudicial to churches	Lay princes should not usurp the rights of churches.
Canon 45	Patronus qui clericum ecclesiae occiderit vel mutilaverit, ius patronatus omittit	A patron who kills or mutilates a cleric of a church loses his right of patronage	Forbade patrons of churches from killing clergymen.
Canon 46	De talliis a clericis non exigendis	On not exacting taxes from clerics	Laid out exceptions to a Lateran III canon exempting clergymen from taxation.
Canon 47	De forma excommunicandi	On the form of an excommunication	Decreed that excommunication may be imposed only after warning in the presence of suitable witnesses and for manifest and reasonable cause.
Canon 48	De more recusandi iudicem	On how to challenge a judge	Laid out the guidelines to challenging a judge.
Canon 49	De poena excommunicantis iniuste	On the punishment for excommunicating someone unjustly	Stipulated that excommunication is to be neither imposed nor lifted for payment.
Canons 50–52			There had been kings of France and Castile who had repudiated their wives and "remarried" with serious public consequences. Marriage, impediments of relationship, publication of banns were addressed in Canon 50.
Canon 53	De bis qui praedia sua in fraudem decimarum dant aliis excolenda	On those who give their fields to others to be cultivated so as to avoid paying tithes	The council condemned those who had their property cultivated by others (non-Christians) in order to avoid tithes.
Canon 54	Ut decimae ante tributa solvantur	That tithes should be paid before taxes	Ruled that tithe payments have priority over all other taxes and dues.
Canon 57	De interpretandis privilegiorum verbis	On interpreting the words of privileges	Gave precise instructions on the interpretation of the privilege of celebrating religious services during interdict, enjoyed by some orders.
Canon 63	De simonia	On simony	Prohibited simony, in that no fees are to be exacted for the consecration of bishops, the blessing of abbots or the ordination of clerics.
Canon 64	De eadem circa monachos et sanctimoniales	On the same with regard to monks and nuns	Ruled that monks and nuns may not require payment for their entry into the religious life.
Canon 67	De usuris Iudaeorum	On the usury of Jews	Prevented Jews from charging "extortionate and excessive interest".
Canon 68	Ut Iudaei discernantur a christianis in habitu	That Jews should be distinguished from Christians in their dress	Mandated a special dress code for Jews and Saracens to distinguish them from Christians so that no Christian shall come to marry them ignorant of who they are.
Canon 69	Ne Iudaei publicis officiis praeficiantur	That Jews are not to hold public offices	Disqualified Jews from holding public offices, incorporating into ecclesiastical law a decree of the Holy Christian Empire.
Canon 70	Ne conversi ad fidem de Iudaeis veterem ritum Iudaeorum retineant	That converts to the faith among the Jews may not retain their old rite of the Jews	Prescribed measures to prevent converted Jews from returning to their former belief.
Canon 71	Expeditio pro recuperanda Terra sancta	Expedition for the recovery of the holy Land	Designated 1 June 1217 as the start of the Fifth Crusade. This canon was disregarded by canonists like Johannes Teutonicus Zemeke, who omitted it from his collection of Lateran IV canons, Compilatio quarta, and Damasus Hungarus, who wrote, "This constitution is temporary, and I do not care to gloss it."
