= William Binham =

English theologian (fl. c. 1374–1396)

The Very Reverend William Binham O.S.B.
- Prior of Wallingford

Personal details
- Died: after 1396
- Denomination: Catholic

William Binham (Note: His surname is variously spelt Binham, Bynham, Vynham, Vymham, and Rynnan.) (fl. c. 1374–1396) was an English theologian and Benedictine prior of Wallingford in Berkshire. He took the degree of D.D. at Oxford, where he was for a time intimate with Wycliffe, against whom he afterwards wrote Contra Positiones Wiclevi.

== Life ==
William Binham was a native of Binham in Norfolk, where there was a Benedictine priory dependent on the abbey of St. Albans. Probably through this connection he entered the monastic profession at the abbey, and became ultimately prior of Wallingford in Berkshire, which was also a cell belonging to St. Albans. The last notice of Binham's life occurs in 1396, when he, as prior of Wallingford, was detained by illness from attending the election of an abbot of St. Albans on 9 October.

== Works ==
John Bale states that Binham wrote a book (his only recorded work) against the teachings of Wycliffe, Contra Positiones Wiclevi, or Contra Vuiclevi propositiones. It is not known to be extant, but Wyclife's reply, Contra Willelmum Vynham monachum S. Albani Determinatio, or Contra Bynhamum monachum, is preserved in a Paris manuscript. If Binham was the opponent mentioned by Wyclife, he must have been a student at Oxford, of which university he is described as doctor of divinity, and had there come into close intimacy with Wycliffe. Binham, however, remained true to the traditions of the Church and the rights of the clergy, and after a while separated himself from his friend, with whom at length he engaged in controversy, and proved, according to the Catholic Leland, no match for his antagonist.

== Sources ==
- Hudson, Anne (2004). "Binham [Bynham, Vynham, Rynnan], William (fl. c. 1374–1396), prior of Wallingford and theologian". Oxford Dictionary of National Biography (online ed.). Oxford University Press. doi:10.1093/ref:odnb/2419. (Subscription, Wikipedia Library access or UK public library membership required.)
- Leland, John (1709). Commentarii de Scriptoribus Britannicis. Vol. 2. Oxford: Theatro Sheldoniano. Cap. cdxxviii. p. 381.
- Riley, Henry Thomas, ed. (1869). Gesta Abbatum Monasterii Sancti Albani, a Thoma Walsingham. Vol. 3. London: Longmans, Green, and Co. p. 426.
- Shirley, Walter Waddington (1865). A Catalogue of the Original Works of Wyclif. Oxford: Clarendon Press. p. 20.

Attribution:

- This article incorporates text from a publication now in the public domain: Lane-Poole, Reginald (1886). "Binham, William". In Stephen, Leslie (ed.). Dictionary of National Biography. Vol. 5. London: Smith, Elder & Co. p. 56.
