= William of Wallingford =

William of Wallingford (died 20 June 1492) was the 47th abbot of St Albans Abbey. He was a Benedictine monk at Holy Trinity Priory, Wallingford, Berkshire (now Oxfordshire), England and like John of Wallingford and Richard of Wallingford, moved from this cell of St Albans Abbey to the abbey itself. He was a favourite of John Stoke, 44th abbot of St Albans, also from Wallingford. On his deathbed in 1451, Stoke was supposed to have given William and Thomas Wallingford, his senior chaplain, charge over 1000 marks but after his death they could only account for 250 marks. The abbot John Wheathampstead who succeeded Stoke suspected the two over the money. Nevertheless, William of Wallingford was later appointed abbot in 1476, after the death of William Albone, apparently for his financial acumen, at a time when the abbey was in debt. William of Wallingford managed to get rid of the debt whilst also spending on the abbey. He built the high altar known as the Wallingford Screen at a cost of £733 and completed the chapter house. The statues on it were destroyed during the Dissolution but were replaced in Victorian times.

According to historian James Anthony Froude, William made the abbey "a nest of sodomy and fornication – the very aisles of the church itself being defiled with the abominable orgies of incestuous monks and nuns". This is based on an account by Cardinal John Morton who investigated on behalf of Pope Innocent VIII after obtaining a papal bull, though it is not clear if a formal visitation took place. The charge was seen as incredible by another historian, F. A. Gasquet, who noted that an obituary said "Nobody showed more care in the worship of God than our reverend father, abbot William Wallingford, or more kindness in works of piety. Nobody showed more devotion to the fervour of faith, hope and charity. None of the ancients before him had shown so much generosity in putting up buildings to the praise and glory of this monastery."

== Overview ==
William of Wallingford became Abbot of St Albans after being a monk at St Albans Abbey since his youth. He only left the house to study at the university, probably at Oxford. He was an administrator rather than a recluse, and at the time of the death of Abbot John Stoke, on 14 Dec. 1451, was already archdeacon, cellarer, bursar, forester, and sub-cellarer of the Abbey of St Albans.

== Election of John Whethamstede ==
He was a candidate for the succession when John Whethamstede was unanimously elected on 16 Jan. 1452. Throughout the abbacy of Whethamstede, Wallingford held office as 'official general,’ archdeacon, and also as chamberlain. Faction raged high among the monks, and grave charges were then, or later, brought against Wallingford, which are detailed at great length in Whethamstede's 'Register'. They are, however, evidently an interpolation, probably by a monk jealous of Wallingford, and Whethamstede not only took no notice of these accusations, but continued Wallingford in all his offices. In 1464 he was, as archdeacon, appointed by the abbot one of a commission for the examination of heretics. Ramridge, Wallingford's successor as abbot, says that he first became distinguished as archdeacon for his care of education, training ten young monks at his own expense, and for the lavish attention he bestowed upon the abbey buildings and treasures. He built 'many fair new buildings' for the abbey, ranging from the library to a stone bakehouse, while those buildings which were falling into a ruinous state he repaired. He also presented the abbey with many rich treasures, such as a gold chalice and precious gold-embroidered vestments. Their value was 980 marks.

== Election of William Albon ==
When, upon the death of Whethamstede on 20 Jan. 1465, William Albon, the Prior, was on 25 Feb. elected his successor, Wallingford took a leading part in the election. On 18 March the new Abbot, with the common consent of the monks, created Wallingford Prior of the monastery. His previous office of archdeacon he continued to exercise. In 1473 he was granted, with others, a commission for the visitation of the curates and vicars of St. Peter's, St. Andrew's, St. Stephen's, and St. Michael's of the town of St Albans. As Prior, he kept up his interest in the maintenance of the monastic buildings, spending 360 pounds on the kitchen, and within eight years laying out a thousand marks on the repairs of farms and houses. He built a Prior's hall, and added all that was necessary for it.

== Election of William Wallingford ==
After Abbot Albon's death on 1 July 1476, Wallingford was on 5 Aug. unanimously elected to succeed him. Wallingford's register covers the years from 1476 to August 1488, though certain leaves are torn out from the end of it. Wallingford took little part in outside affairs. He resisted successfully certain claims of Archbishop Bourchier over the abbey, which were decided in the abbot's favour upon appeal to Rome. In 1480 Wallingford was appointed, by the general chapter of Benedictines at Northampton, Visitor of all Benedictine monasteries in the Diocese of Lincoln, but he commissioned William Hardwyk and John Maynard to conduct the visitation in his place.

== Wallingford's government of the abbey ==
=== Discipline ===
His government of the abbey was marked by regard for strict discipline tempered with generosity. Thus, while he deposed John Langton, Prior of Tynemouth, for disobedience to his 'Visitors', he gave letters testimonial for the absolution of a priest who, by misadventure, had committed homicide. He manumitted certain villeins and their children. Wallingford sent in 1487 John Rothebury, his archdeacon, to Rome in order to try to win certain concessions for the abbey, but the mission proved a failure.

=== Weak points ===
Wallingford's abbacy shows some of the weak points characteristic of 15th century monasticism. There is a desire to make the best of both worlds. The lay offices of the abbey were turned to advantage. For example, in 1479 Wallingford conferred the office of seneschal or steward of the liberty of St. Albans, with all its emoluments, on William, Lord Hastings, notwithstanding the fact that Abbot Albon had already in 1474 conferred the same on John Forster for life. Three years afterwards Wallingford gave the office jointly to the same Lord Hastings and John Forster. However, Lord Hastings was put to death by Richard III soon after, and Forster, after being imprisoned in the Tower for nearly nine months, 'in hope of a mitigation of his punishment, did remit and release all his title and supreme interest that he had in his office of seneschal of St. Albans.' This is one instance of several, which show that the lay offices of the abbey were used for selfish ends.

=== Attitude to the bishops ===
The attitude of Wallingford to the bishops was conciliatory as a rule, sometimes even obsequious. Thus, when he feared the loss of the priory at Pembroke, given by Duke Humphrey, through Edward's resumption of grants made by his three Lancastrian predecessors, he applied humbly to the chancellor, George Neville, Bishop of Exeter, for his good offices, and through him secured a re-grant. The bishop later, in return, was granted the next presentation of the rectory of Stanmore Magna in Middlesex. Mr. Riley, in his introduction to the second volume of Whethamstede's 'Chronicle,’ is, however, unduly severe in his interpretation of many of Wallingford's acts.

== Wallingford's qualities ==
From the golden opinions of his immediate successor in the abbacy, Thomas Ramridge, no less than from the simple entries in Wallingford's own register, it is clear that he was efficient and thoroughgoing, an excellent administrator, and a diligent defender of his abbey. He voluntarily paid 1,830 pounds of debts left by his predecessor. He built a noble altar-screen, long considered the finest piece of architecture in the abbey. Upon this he spent eleven hundred marks, and another thousand marks in finishing the chapter house. He built also, at the cost of 100 pounds, a small chantry near the altar on the south side, in which he built his tomb, with his effigy in marble. His tomb bears the inscription:

"Gulielmus quartus, opus hoc laudabile cuius Extitit, hic pausat: Christus sibi præmia reddat".

Two fine windows, a precious mitre, and two rich pastoral staves were other gifts the abbey owed to his munificence. When he died in or about 1488 he left the abbey entirely freed from debt.

== St Albans Press ==
The main interest of Wallingford's abbacy lies in the fact that the art of printing, brought into England a few years before by William Caxton, was then introduced into the town of St Albans. The whole subject of the relation of the St. Albans press to other presses is obscure, and even the name of the St. Albans printer and his connection with the abbot unknown. All that is certain is that between 1480 and 1486 this unknown printer issued eight works, the first six in Latin, the last two in English. The most important and last of these was the famous 'Boke of St. Albans' [see Berners, Juliana]. All that is clearly known of the St. Albans printer is that in Wynkyn de Worde's reprint of 'St. Albans Chronicle' the colophon states: 'Here endith this present chronicle, compiled in a book and also emprinted by one sometime schoolmaster of St. Alban.' There is no clear proof of any closer relation between Wallingford and the 'schoolmaster of St. Alban' than between John Esteney, Abbot of Westminster, and William Caxton, who worked under the shadow of Westminster Abbey. Yet the probabilities of close connection in a little place like St. Albans between the abbot, who was keenly interested in education, and the 'schoolmaster,’ who was furthering education by the printing of books, are in themselves great, and are confirmed by the fact that two of the eight books printed between 1480 and 1486 bear the arms of the town of St. Albans. See, for the discussion of the subject, Blades and Duff. Mr. Blades is of the opinion that no connection between the schoolmaster and the abbey can be established.

== Death ==
It is widely accepted that William died in 1492, as that is when the succeeding abbot took charge, but some accounts have suggested that he died in 1484 or 1488.
