= Matthew of Westminster =

Nonexistent person

Matthew of Westminster was long regarded as the author of the Flores Historiarum (in fact written by Matthew Paris), and is now thought never to have existed.

The error was first discovered in 1826 by Francis Palgrave, who said that Matthew was "a phantom who never existed," and later the truth of this statement was completely proved by Henry Luard. The name appears to have been taken from that of Matthew Paris, who likely authored the Flores to serve as an abridgement of his larger Chronica majora, and from Westminster Abbey, where the work was continued and copied after Paris's death.

He is sometimes surnamed Florilegus (lit. 'flower-gatherer'), in reference to the title of his supposed work.
