= William de Kirkeby =

English prior (died 1302)

William de Kirkeby (died 1302) was an English prior. He was prior at Wallingford Priory in the late 13th century.

== Life events ==
The Bodleian Library holds a mutilated deed (c. 1280) showing some disputes between Kirkeby and Henry de Horsyndon, rector, and the parishioners of the parish of St. Mary the Greater in Wallingford.

The Great Munden manor was received by Kirkeby when his brother John de Kirkeby, Bishop of Ely, died in 1290. Oldbury, a Stoke Mandeville manor, was owned by Kirkeby's wife (Christiana) during the reign of king Edward I.

Richard of Wallingford's father died when he just turned 10 years old (c. 1301-1302) and was soon thereafter adopted by Kirkeby and taken care. Kirkeby sent Richard as a young man to Oxford University to get educated.

Kirkeby died in 1302.

== Sources ==
- Bodleian Library (1878). Calendar of Charters and Rolls Preserved in the Bodleian Library. Clarendon Press. p. 17.
- Dugdale, William (1846). Monasticon Anglicanum...a History of the Abbies and Other Monasteries...and Cathedral and Collegiate Churches...in England and Wales. Bohn. p. 278.
- Hockey, Thomas; Bracher, Katherine; Bolt, Marvin; Trimble, Virginia; Jarrell, Richard; Palmeri, JoAnn; Marché, Jordan D.; Williams, Thomas; Ragep, F. Jamil (2007). Biographical Encyclopedia of Astronomers. Springer. ISBN 978-0-387-30400-7.
- Lee, Sidney (1896). DICTIONARY OF NATIONAL BIOGRAPHY.
- North, John (2007). God's Clockmaker: Richard of Wallingford and the Invention of Time. Continuum. ISBN 978-0-8264-4474-5.
