= Wallingford Priory =

Priory in Oxfordshire, England

Coordinates: 51.60127°N 1.12670°W

Wallingford Priory was a Benedictine priory dedicated to the Holy Trinity in Wallingford in the English county of Berkshire (now Oxfordshire). Nothing remains of Holy Trinity Priory, which is believed to have stood on the site of the Bullcroft recreation ground off the High Street.

== History ==
Sometime between 1077 and 1091, Robert D'Oyly, lord of Wallingford, gave the collegiate Church of Holy Trinity to St Albans Abbey. Paul, 14th Abbot of St Albans, sent some of his monks to establish a cell there. Holy Trinity served as both the priory and parochial church. The monks of Wallingford are known to have ministered to the sick. The priory remained a dependency of St. Albans.

=== Notable priors ===
The learned John of Wallingford, was named prior in 1191, before being elected abbot of St. Albans four years later. Towards the end of the 13th century, Prior William de Kirkeby took in the ten year old orphan Richard of Wallingford, and later sent him to Oxford to be educated. Richard became a monk at Wallingford, and as later abbot of St. Albans made significant contributions to astronomy and horology. He is best known for the astronomical clock he designed. William of Wallingford, was a monk of Wallingford who moved to St. Albans and later became abbot. He had the Wallingford Screen, a high altar screen made for the Abbey. William Binham, a prior and theologian in the late 14th century, challenged the views of John Wycliff, his former friend and colleague at Oxford.

The priory was dissolved in 1525 by Cardinal Wolsey, partly in order to fund the building of Cardinal College, Oxford.

In 1983, work at 56 High Street exposed burials in chalk cists which are believed to be part of the cemetery.
