= William of St Albans =

Benedictine monk and hagiographer (fl. 1178)

William of St Albans (fl. 1178) was a Benedictine monk and hagiographer who wrote a history of the martyrdom of Saint Alban, the first such work to name Amphibalus after Geoffrey of Monmouth.

Simon, abbot of St Albans (1167–1188) asked William to write The Passion of St Alban (Passio sancti Albani), according to the book's preface. The book mentions that the body of Amphibalus had yet to be found: this occurred in 1178, suggesting that the work was written before this date. William drew on the stories of Alban as told by Bede and Geoffrey of Monmouth, the latter of whom he acknowledges in the preface. He frames the work as a translation of an Old English book, similar to Geoffrey's claim that his De gestis Britonum was a translation of an ancient work.

Ralph of Dunstable later made a versification of William's Passion; the Vie de seint Auban by Matthew Paris is another adaptation of the work.
