= Roger of Wendover =

English monk and chronicler (died 1236)

- Born: Unknown; Wendover(?), England
- Died: 6 May 1236; St Albans Abbey, St Albans, England
- Occupation: Chronicler

Roger of Wendover (died 6 May 1236), probably a native of Wendover in Buckinghamshire, was an English chronicler of the 13th century.

At an uncertain date he became a monk at St Albans Abbey; afterwards he was appointed prior of the cell of Belvoir, but he forfeited this dignity in the early years of Henry III, having been found guilty of wasting the endowments. His latter years were passed at St Albans, where he died on 6 May 1236.

== Works ==
Roger is the first in the series of important chroniclers who worked at St Albans. His best-known chronicle, called the Flores Historiarum (Flowers of History), is based in large part on material which already existed at St Albans. The actual nucleus of the early part of Roger's Flowers of History is supposed to have been the compilation of John de Cella (also known as John of Wallingford), who was abbot of St Albans from 1195 to 1214, although that is inconclusive.

John's work started from the year 1188, and was revised and continued by Roger up to 1235, the year before his death. Roger claims in his preface to have selected "from the books of catholic writers worthy of credit, just as flowers of various colours are gathered from various fields." Hence he called his work Flores Historiarum—a title appropriated in the 14th century to a long compilation by various hands. Begun at St Albans based upon the Chronicle of Matthew Paris, it was finally completed at Westminster continuing to the year 1326. The work was long ascribed to one "Matthew of Westminster", but it is now known that no actual chronicler of that name ever existed.

Roger's work, like that of most chroniclers, is valued not so much for what he culled from previous writers as for its full and lively narrative of contemporary events, from 1216 to 1235. An example being his description of King John's troops action in the north during the bitter war at the end of his reign:

The whole land was covered with these limbs of the devil like locusts, who assembled to blot out every thing from the face of the earth: for, running about with drawn swords and knives, they ransacked towns, houses, cemeteries, and churches, robbing everyone, sparing neither women nor children.

The historian W. L. Warren argued that Roger intended to tell stories which encouraged virtue rather than to record facts:

To be fair to Wendover, he was not setting up to be a careful historian, and it is unfortunate that his stories have been seized upon because they seem to supply a great want in more reputable chronicles...he was more interested in the effectiveness of his sermons than the authenticity of the stories with which he illustrated them. He was making an edifying pot-pourri, and he modestly called his book Flowers of History. It is a pity that his showiest blooms tourn out to be artificial.

The Revelation of St Nicholas to a monk of Evesham was composed in 1196 but the author is unknown. In an abridged form, it is found in Roger of Wendover's Flores Historiarum under the year 1196. It is a curious religious allegory, treating the pilgrimage of a soul from death through purgatory and paradise to heaven. The monk, conducted by St Nicholas, is taken from place to place in purgatory, where he meets and converses with persons of various ranks, who relate their stories and their suffering. From purgatory he advances slowly to paradise, and finally reaches the gates of heaven; after which he awakes.

== Publication history ==
Roger's work is known to us through one thirteenth-century manuscript in the Bodleian Library (Douce manuscript 207), a mutilated 14th-century copy in the British Library (Cotton manuscript Otho B. v.), and the edition prepared by Matthew Paris which forms the first part of that writer's Chronica Majora. The best edition of Roger's works is that of H. O. Coxe (four volumes, London, 1841–44); there is another (covering the material from 1154) in the Rolls Series by H. G. Hewlett (three volumes, 1886–89). Roger wrote on the Order of Assassins claiming they were situated in Tyre "in Phoenicia, around the bishopric of Antardus". It is presumed he got this information from travellers visiting St Albans or people returning from pilgrimage to Jerusalem.
