= John of Wallingford (d. 1214) =

Abbot of St. Albans abbey

John of Wallingford (died 1214), also known as John de Cella, was Abbot of St Albans Abbey in the English county of Hertfordshire from 1195 to his death in 1214. He was previously prior of Holy Trinity Priory at Wallingford in Berkshire (now Oxfordshire), a cell of St Albans.

He should not be confused with another John of Wallingford (died 1258), who was a friend of the famous chronicler Matthew Paris; nor with the unknown author of the so-called "Chronicle of John of Wallingford" (ca. 1225–1250), that is included in a manuscript of the papers of the later John of Wallingford.

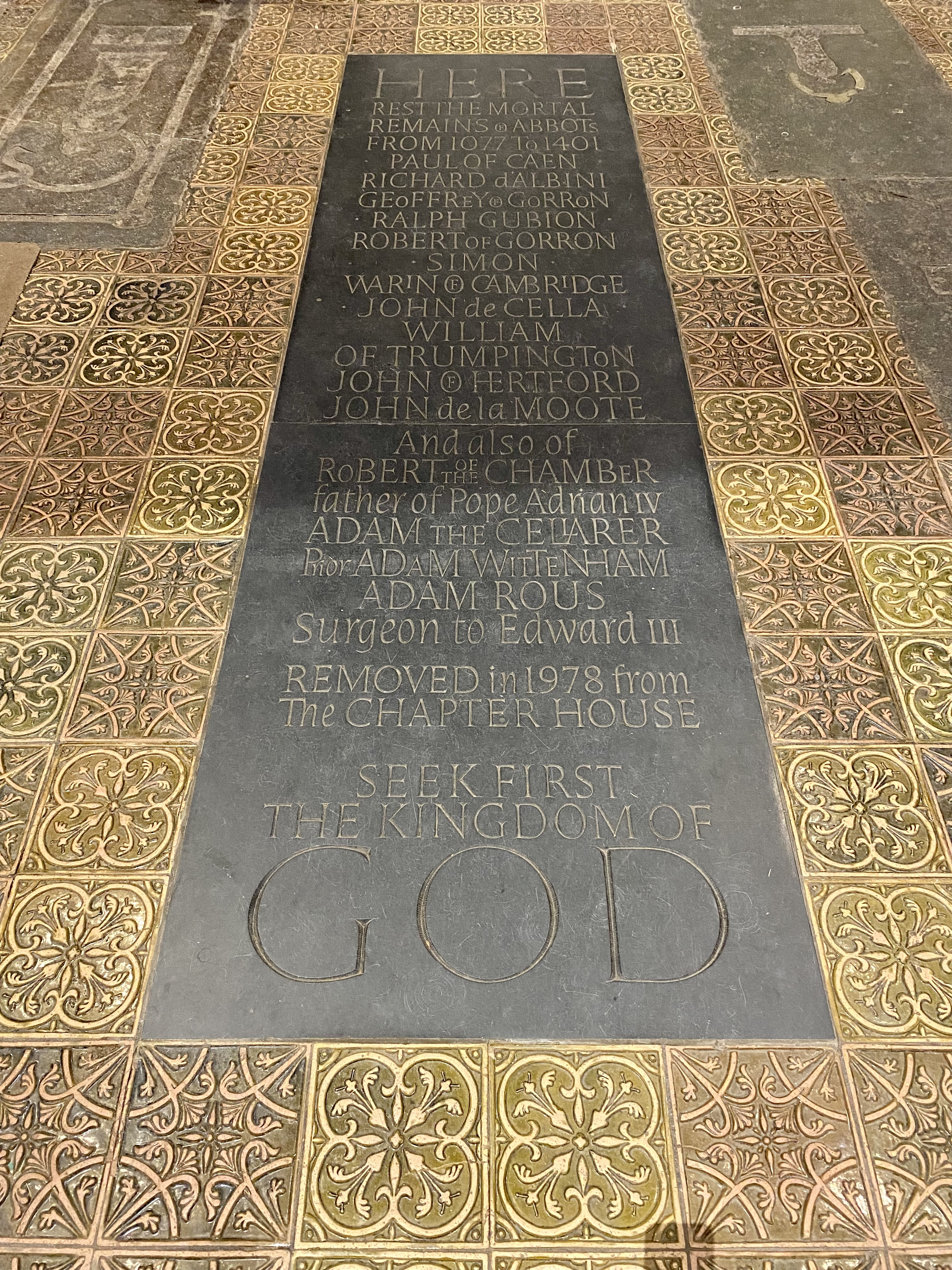
Stone marking the 1978 reburial of the remains of Wallingford and other Abbots of St Albans at St Albans Cathedral

== Life ==
According to Matthew Paris's Gesta Abbatum ("Actions of the Abbots"), John came from a moderate family not far from a place called Stodham, presumably today's Stadhampton about five miles north of Wallingford. A tradition that he was from the family of John de la Hyde de Southcote, ancestor of the Hyde family of Denchworth, is apparently mentioned by some editions of Burke's Landed Gentry but it is not clear what the basis for this may be.

The Gesta records that John studied in Paris. He gained an excellent reputation and "in grammar he was considered a very Priscian, in poetry a perfect Ovid, and in physic esteemed equal to Galen". After taking Benedictine vows, he was sent to Wallingford Priory, where he became prior in 1191. From this he gained his St Albans by-names "de Wallingford" and "de Cella", having been superior of this important cell of the abbey. Four years later, on 20 July 1195, he was elected Abbot of St. Albans, where he presided with "sanctity and success". He rebuilt the refectory and the dormitory, and extended the west front of the abbey church, though not without difficulty: the work "swallowed up the revenues as the sea the rivers, and made no progress", until a simplifed design was eventually completed.

He was regarded by the 19th-century scholar Henry Richards Luard as the originator of the core of Roger of Wendover's Flores Historiarum, which became the first part of Matthew Paris's Chronica Majora, but this has since been questioned. No source of the time makes any mention of him as a historian.
