= Hereward the Wake =

11th-century English rebel against the Norman Conquest

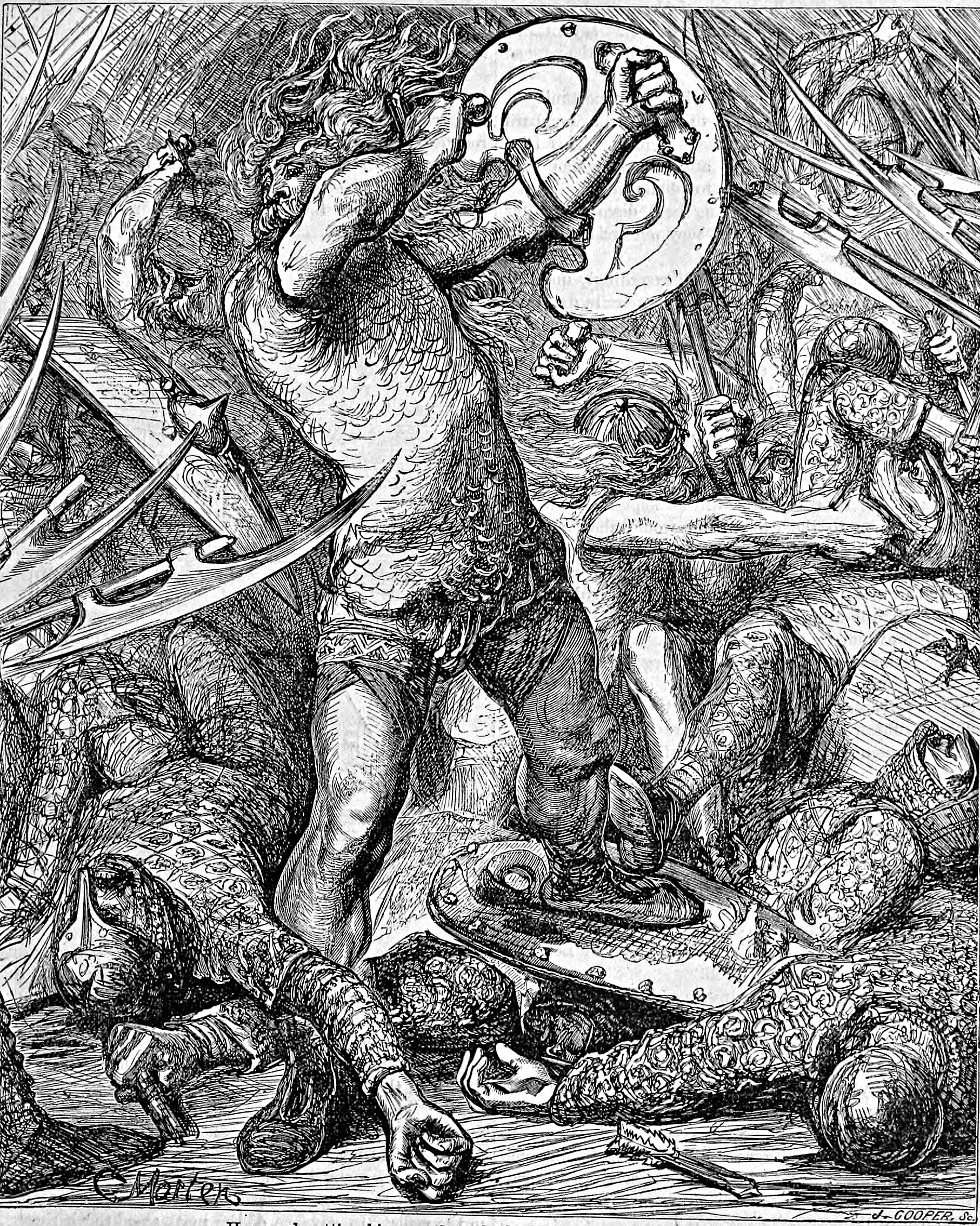
- Hereward fighting Normans from Cassell's Illustrated History of England (1865)
- Born: c. 1035; Lincolnshire, England
- Died: c. 1072 (aged 36–37)
- Other names: Hereward the Outlaw and Hereward the Exile
- Movement: English resistance to Norman Conquest

Hereward the Wake (Old English: [ˈhɛ.rɛ.ward]; modern English pronunciation /ˈhɛ.rɪ.wərd/ HEH-rih-wərd; c. 1035 – c. 1072), also known as Hereward the Outlaw or Hereward the Exile, was an Anglo-Saxon nobleman and a leader of local resistance to the Norman Conquest of England. His base when he led the rebellion against the Norman rulers was the Isle of Ely, in eastern England. According to legend, he roamed the Fens, which covers parts of the modern counties of Cambridgeshire, Lincolnshire and Norfolk, and led popular opposition to William the Conqueror.

== Primary sources ==
Several primary sources exist for Hereward's life, but the accuracy of their information is difficult to evaluate. They are the version of the Anglo-Saxon Chronicle written at Peterborough Abbey (the "E manuscript" or Peterborough Chronicle), the Domesday Book of 1086, the Liber Eliensis (Latin 'Book of Ely') and, by far the most detailed, the Gesta Herewardi.

The texts are sometimes contradictory. For example, Gesta Chapter XXVIII places Hereward's attack on Peterborough Abbey after the Siege of Ely whereas the Peterborough Chronicle (1070) has it immediately before. This probably indicates, as the preface to the Gesta suggests, that conflicting oral traditions about Hereward were already current in the Fens in the late 11th and early 12th centuries. In addition, there may be some partisan bias in the early writers: the notice of Hereward in the Peterborough Chronicle, for instance, was written in a monastery, which he was said to have sacked, some fifty years after the date of the raid. On the other hand, the original version of the Gesta was written in explicit praise of Hereward; much of its information was provided by men who knew him personally, and principally, if the preface is to be believed, a former colleague-in-arms and member of his father's former household named Leofric the Deacon.

=== Gesta Herewardi ===
The Gesta Herewardi (or Herwardi) is a Middle Latin text, probably written around 1109–31. The 12th-century Latin text purports to be a translation of an earlier (and now lost) work in Old English, with gaps in the damaged original filled out from oral history. The earliest surviving copy of the Gesta Herewardi is in a manuscript produced around the middle of the 13th century at Peterborough Abbey, along with other materials relating to the abbey. This 13th-century manuscript is known as the "Register of Robert of Swaffham".

What is known of the earlier history of the Gesta Herewardi comes from its prologue, according to which the original text was written in Old English by Leofric, a priest of Hereward's household, who became one of his companions in arms during Hereward's resistance to William the Conqueror. Leofric's work may have been precipitated by Hereward's death. The prologue also reports that the earlier, Old English version was badly damaged but not destroyed: the author of the Gesta Herewardi had been instructed by his superior to seek out the remains of Leofric's work and to translate it into Latin. This he did, but, owing to its damaged condition, he filled in the resulting lacunae from oral history, at his superior's insistence. It has been argued that the author of Gesta Herewardi was Richard of Ely, and that his superior was Bishop Hervey of Ely, who held that office from 1109 to 1131.

The version of the Gesta Herewardi that exists today is a transcription of this work, which was incorporated into a book containing charters and other material relating to the abbey at Peterborough known as the "Register of Robert of Swaffham", but variant descriptions such as "Robert of Swaffham's Book" are also found. According to the historian Janet D. Martin, the book was created in "about 1250", and originally ended with the Gesta Herewardi, but further material, unrelated to the Hereward story, was added in the 14th century.

A serial edition of the Gesta Herewardi translated by W. D. Sweeting was published from 1895 as a supplement to Fenland Notes and Queries: this was a quarterly magazine, published at Peterborough, of which Sweeting was editor at the time. He used a transcription of the Gesta Herewardi by S. H. Miller to produce an edition in which the transcription and translation appear in parallel columns.

== Life and legend ==
=== Family ===
Due to the fragmented evidence of his life, the legend of Hereward the Wake has become a magnet for speculators and amateur scholars. The earliest references to his parentage, in the Gesta, make him the son of Edith, a descendant of Oslac of York, and Leofric of Bourne, nephew of Ralph the Staller. Alternatively, it has also been argued that Leofric, Earl of Mercia and his wife Lady Godiva were Hereward's real parents. There is no evidence for this, and Abbot Brand of Peterborough, stated to have been Hereward's uncle, does not appear to have been related to either Leofric or Godiva. It is improbable that − if Hereward were a member of this prominent family – his parentage would not be a matter of record. Some modern research suggests him to have been Anglo-Danish with a Danish father, Asketil; since Brand is also a Danish name, it makes sense that the Abbot may have been Asketil's brother. Hereward's apparent ability to call on Danish support may also support this theory.

Hereward's birth is conventionally dated as 1035/36 because the Gesta Herewardi states that he was first exiled in 1054 in his 18th year. However, since the account in the Gesta of the early part of his exile (in Scotland, Cornwall and Ireland) contains fantastic elements, it is hard to know if it is trustworthy. Peter Rex, in his 2005 biography of Hereward, points out that the campaigns in which he is reported to have fought in the region of Flanders seem to have begun around 1063 and suggests that, if he was 18 at the time of his exile, he was born in 1044/45. But this would be based on the assumption that the early part of the story is largely fictitious.

His birthplace is supposed to be in or near Bourne in Lincolnshire. The Domesday Book shows that a man named Hereward held lands in the parishes of Witham on the Hill and Barholm with Stow in the southwestern corner of Lincolnshire as a tenant of Peterborough Abbey; prior to his exile, Hereward had also held lands as a tenant of Croyland Abbey at Crowland, 8 miles (13 km) east of Market Deeping in the neighbouring fenland. In those times it was a boggy and marshy area. Since the holdings of abbeys could be widely dispersed across parishes, the precise location of his personal holdings is uncertain but was certainly somewhere in south Lincolnshire.

=== Exile ===
According to the Gesta Herewardi, Hereward was exiled at the age of eighteen for disobedience to his father and disruptive behaviour, which caused problems among the local community. He was declared an outlaw by Edward the Confessor. The Gesta tells various stories of his supposed adventures as a young man while in exile in Cornwall, Ireland and Flanders. These include a fight with an enormous bear, and the rescue of a Cornish princess from an unwanted marriage. Many historians consider these tales to be largely fictions. Having been shipwrecked in the territory of Count Manasses I of Guînes, he joined the count of Flanders in an expedition against "Scaldemariland" (probably islands in Scheldt estuary). Historian Elizabeth van Houts considers this aspect of the story to be consistent with evidence concerning expeditions led by Robert the Frisian on behalf of his father Baldwin V, Count of Flanders in the early 1060s. Peter Rex also accepts that these events probably occurred.

At the time of the Norman conquest of England, he was still in exile in Europe, working as a successful mercenary for Baldwin V. According to the Gesta he took part in tournaments in Cambrai. At some point in his exile Hereward is said to have married Turfida, a Gallo-Germanic woman from a wealthy family in Saint-Omer. She is said in the Gesta to have fallen in love with him before she met him, having heard of his heroic exploits.

=== Return to England ===
Map showing the Isle of Ely (centre right) surrounded by water, from Joseph Ellis's English Atlas, circa 1765.

The Gesta Herewardi says Hereward returned to England a few days after the death of Count Baldwin V of Flanders, who died on 1 September 1067. The Gesta says that he discovered that his family's lands had been taken over by the Normans and his brother killed with his head then placed on a spike at the gate to his house. Hereward took revenge on the Normans who killed his brother while they were ridiculing the English at a drunken feast. He allegedly killed fifteen of them with the assistance of one helper. He then gathered followers and went to Peterborough Abbey to be knighted by his uncle Abbot Brand. He returned briefly to Flanders to allow the situation to cool down before returning to England.

The Gesta claims that William de Warenne's brother-in-law Frederick swore to kill Hereward, but Hereward outwitted him and killed him. Since Hereward's killing of Frederick is also attested in the independent Hyde Chronicle, this event is regarded as "almost certainly" true. William himself later pursued Hereward, but Hereward supposedly unhorsed him with an arrow shot.

In 1070 Hereward certainly participated in the anti-Norman insurrection centred on the Isle of Ely. In 1069 or 1070 the Danish king Sweyn Estrithson sent a small army to try to establish a camp on the Isle of Ely. Hereward appears to have joined them. Hereward stormed and sacked Peterborough Abbey in company with local men and Sweyn's Danes. While the Gesta says this was after the main battle at Ely, the Peterborough Chronicle says it was before. The historical consensus is that the Chronicle's account is most accurate. His justification is said to have been that he wished to save the Abbey's treasures and relics from the rapacious Normans led by the new Norman abbot who had ousted his uncle Brand. According to the Gesta he returned the treasures looted from the abbey after having a vision of Saint Peter. However, the Peterborough Chronicle says that the treasure was carried off to Denmark.

Hereward was then joined by a small army led by Morcar, the Saxon former Earl of Northumbria who had been ousted by William. William sent an army to deal with the rebels. In 1071, Hereward and Morcar were forced to retreat to their stronghold and made a desperate stand on the Isle of Ely against the Conqueror's rule. Both the Gesta Herewardi and the Liber Eliensis claim that the Normans made a frontal assault, aided by a huge, mile-long timber causeway, but that this sank under the weight of armour and horses. The Normans then tried to intimidate the English with a witch, who cursed them from a wooden tower, but Hereward managed to set a fire that toppled the tower with the witch in it. The Gesta includes other fantastical tales about Hereward's prowess, including disguising himself as a potter to spy on the king and escaping from captivity.

It is said that the Normans, probably led by one of William's knights named Belasius (Belsar), then bribed the monks of the island to reveal a safe route across the marshes, resulting in Ely's capture. An earlier hillfort now known as Belsar's Hill is still extant and sits astride the much older route known as Aldreth's Causeway, which would have been a direct route from the Isle of Ely to Cambridge.

Morcar was taken and imprisoned, but Hereward is said to have escaped with some of his followers into the wild fenland and to have continued his resistance. This escape is noted in all the earliest surviving sources.

An ancient earthwork about 1.2 miles (2 km) east of Willingham, Cambridgeshire is still visible at the junction of the old fen causeway and Iram Drove. This circular feature, known as Belsar's Hill, is a potential site for a fort, built by William, from which to attack Ely and Hereward. There were perhaps as few as four causeways onto the isle itself, with this being the southerly route from London and the likely route of William's army.

=== Later life ===
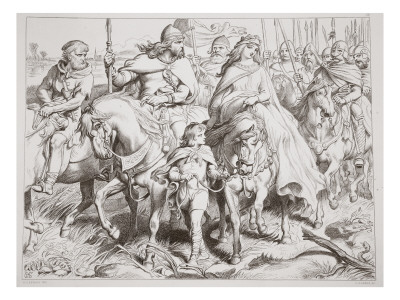
Hereward escorts Alftruda, illustration by Henry Courtney Selous

There are conflicting accounts about Hereward's life after the fall of Ely. The Gesta Herewardi says Hereward attempted to negotiate with William but was provoked into a fight with a man named Ogger. The fight led to his capture and imprisonment. His followers, however, liberated him when he was being transferred from one castle to another. Hereward's former gaoler persuaded the king to negotiate once more, and he was eventually pardoned by William and lived the rest of his life in relative peace. It also says that he married a second wife after Turfida entered a convent. She is said have been called Alftruda and was the widow of Earl Dolfin.

Geoffrey Gaimar, in his Estoire des Engleis, says instead that Hereward lived for some time as an outlaw in the Fens, but that as he was on the verge of making peace with William, he was set upon and killed by a group of Norman knights. It is also possible that Hereward received no pardon and went into exile, never to be heard from again; this was in fact the fate of many prominent Englishmen after the Conquest. Ogger ("Oger the Breton"), either the person Hereward is supposed to have fought or an heir, appears to have taken over his lands. Joseph Harrop in his 1764 A New History of England, suggests that after his escape from Ely, Hereward went to Scotland.

== Name ==
Hereward is an Old English name, composed of the elements here (Old English for 'army'), and ward (meaning 'guard'). It is cognate with the Old High German name Heriwart. Within the 12th-century Gesta, Hereward is given the epithet 'outlaw'.

The epithet 'the Wake' is first attested in the late 14th-century Peterborough Chronicle, as the Old English wæcnan. The 18th-century first editor of the chronicle, Joseph Sparke, ascribed the epithet to a 'John of Peterborough', who is otherwise unknown to history. Two potential etymologies have been suggested:

The most common interpretation is that wæcnan means 'the watchful', by comparison with Dutch waken which means 'to guard' or 'to watch over'. This interpretation was adopted by the later mythology. In Charles Kingsley's 1865 novel Hereward the Wake: Last of the English, Hereward acquires it when, with the help of his servant Martin Lightfoot, he foils an assassination attempt during a hunting party by a group of knights jealous of his popularity.

The alternative theory is that the name originated from the Wake family, the Norman landowners who gained Hereward's land in Bourne, Lincolnshire, after his death. The Wakes may have applied their name to Hereward to imply a family connection and therefore legitimise their claim to the land. The family claimed descent from Hereward's daughter by his second wife, Alftruda.

== Historicity ==
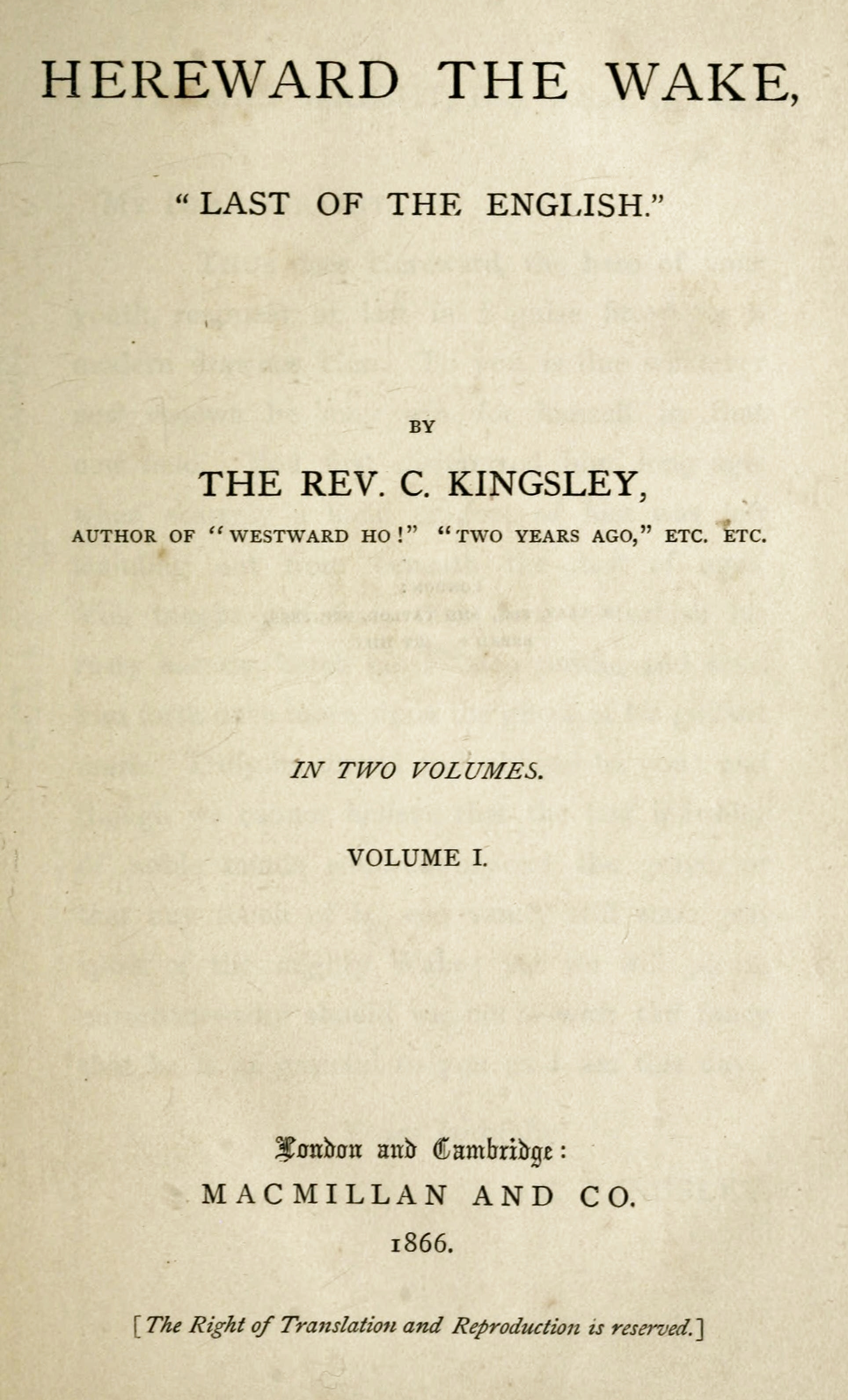
Title page of Charles Kingsley's novel Hereward the Wake.

The existence of Hereward is not generally disputed, but the story of his life, especially as recounted in the Gesta, almost certainly contains exaggerations of his deeds and some outright fictions. Hugh M. Thomas argues that the Gesta is intended to be an entertaining story about an Anglo-Saxon hero creating a fantasy of successful resistance to the Normans. Hereward is always motivated by honest emotions and displays chivalric values in his warfare, unlike his enemies. His supreme manly prowess is constantly emphasised. Potentially discreditable episodes such as the looting of Peterborough are excused and even wiped out by stories such as the vision of St. Peter leading him to return the loot.

The fact of Hereward's participation in the events at Ely is attested in early documents such as the annal for 1071 in the Anglo-Saxon Chronicle. Another text of the Chronicle also tells of his involvement in the looting. Early sources say nothing about him other than the fact that he was at Ely and that he led the last band of resisters. Estoire des Engleis (c.1140) says that he had a noble family, but is unspecific. His alleged genealogy is given in the Gesta and the later Historia Croylandensis but with some variations. By the 15th century, the Wake family were claiming descent from him and elevating his ancestry by asserting that he was the son of Leofric, Earl of Mercia and Lady Godiva.

It is possible that some of the stories about Hereward mutated into tales about Robin Hood or influenced them. Hereward nevertheless remained a minor figure until the Victorian period, when the idea of native Anglo-Saxon heroism became popular. Kingsley's novel elevated Hereward to the position of a national hero. It drew on the theory that traditional English liberties were destroyed by the "Norman yoke", an idea earlier popularised in Walter Scott's novel Ivanhoe. Both novels helped create the image of a romantic Anglo-Saxon England violated by Norman tyranny. After its publication Hereward appears in numerous popular historical works.

The Harwood family, a Lincolnshire gentry family who resided in Bourne, and Thurlby in the surrounding area claimed descent from Hereward the Wake

== Legacy ==
- HMS Hereward was an H-class destroyer of the Royal Navy commissioned on 9 December 1936.
- "Hereward" is the motto of No. 2 Squadron RAF. They are based at RAF Lossiemouth in Moray and their crest contains a Wake knot.
- BR standard class 7 (otherwise known as the "Britannia Class") locomotive No 70037 carried the name "Hereward the Wake".
- There is a long-distance footpath through the Cambridgeshire fenland from Peterborough to Ely called the Hereward Way.
- On 10 July 1980 an independent local radio station, Hereward Radio named after Hereward the Wake, was launched in Peterborough covering Cambridgeshire and South Lincolnshire. The station was rebranded Hereward FM in 1990 and eventually became part of the national Heart radio network.
- When East Cambridgeshire District Council transferred its housing stock, it created a housing association called "Hereward Housing" to receive the accommodation. This was later taken over by Sanctuary Housing to form Sanctuary Hereward.
- Hampstead in north London has a preparatory school for boys called Hereward House School.
- Loughton has a state primary school named after Hereward.
- Coventry has an integrated-disability college, Hereward College, named after Hereward.
- Hereward Hall is a boys' boarding house at King's Ely school.
- The clipper Hereward, a trading vessel built in Glasgow in 1877, was wrecked at Maroubra Beach on 5 May 1898.
- Hereward wheat, bred by the Plant Breeding Institute (now RAGT Seeds) was the most important and widely-grown Group 1 (bread-making) variety in the UK in the 1990s and 2000s.
- The Hereward Estate in Bourne is named after him.
- The Hereward Community Rail Partnership launched in 2012 to focus on the railway line between Peterborough and Ely
- Hereward appears in the JRPG Persona 5 Royal as Goro Akechi's third tier persona.

== See also ==
- Courteenhall, Northamptonshire home of the Wake family who claim descent from Hereward.
- Eadric the Wild, another rebel leader against the Norman conquest

== Bibliography ==
- Gesta Herewardi Saxoni, ed. T. D. Hardy and C. T. Martin, Lestoire des Engles solum la translaction maistre Geffrei Gaimar. (Rolls Series; 91.) 2 vols: vol 1. London, 1888. pp. 339–404 // tr. M. Swanton, "The Deeds of Hereward" In Medieval Outlaws. Twelve Tales in Modern English Translation, ed. T. H. Ohlgren. 2nd ed. West Lafayette, 2005. 28–99.
- Liber Eliensis, ed. E. O. Blake, Liber Eliensis. (Camden Society; ser. 3; vol. 92.) London, 1962 // tr. J. Fairweather. Liber Eliensis: a History of the Isle of Ely from the Seventh Century to the Twelfth. Woodbridge, 2005.
- Rex, Peter The English Resistance: the Underground War Against the Normans, Stroud: Tempus ISBN 0-7524-2827-6, chapters 8, 9 and 10 contain new data on his family.
- Hereward, together with De Gestis Herewardi Saxonis; researched and compiled in the 12th century by monastery historians, revised and rewritten in modern English by Trevor A. Bevis, (1982), Pub. Westrydale Press (reissue of 1979 ed), ISBN 0-901680-16-8.
- Bremmer, R. H. Jr. "The Gesta Herewardi: transforming an Anglo-Saxon into an Englishman", in: T. Summerfield & K. Busby (eds.), People and Texts; relationships in medieval literature: studies presented to Erik Kooper. Amsterdam/New York: Rodopi, 2007, pp. 29–42.
- Miller, S.H. (transcription) and Sweeting, W. D. (translation), De Gestis Herwardi Saxonis The exploits of Hereward the Saxon, Fenland Notes & Queries, (vol. 3, supplements), Peterborough, 1895.
- Gaimar, Geoffrey, Lestorie des Engles, Hardy, T.D. & Martin, C.T. (ed. and trans.), Rolls Series, 91 (2 vols.), 1888–89.
- Short, Ian (ed. & trans.), Geffrei Gaimar Estoire des Engleis History of the English, Oxford University Press, 2009.
- Thomas, Hugh M (1998). Harper-Bill, Christopher (ed.). "The Gesta Herwardi, the English, and their Conquerors". Anglo-Norman Studies: Proceedings of the Battle Conference. XXI. The Boydell Press: 213–232. Proceedings of the Battle Conference 1998
- De Gestis Herwardi — Le gesta di Ervardo, ed. and Italian tr. Alberto Meneghetti, (ETS) Pisa, 2013.
- Orchard, Andy. "Hereward and Grettir: Brothers from Another Mother?" In New Norse Studies: Essays on the Literature and Culture of Medieval Scandinavia, edited by Jeffrey Turco, 7–59. Islandica 58. Ithaca: Cornell University Library, 2015.
