= Ely Rebellion =

Rebellion in Ely against William the Conqueror

- Part of the Norman Conquest
Date	1069 – 1071
Location	England
Result	The Normans decisively defeat the rebellion of the Isle of Ely

Belligerents
Kingdom of England	Kingdom of Denmark; Anglo Saxon Rebels

Commanders and leaders
William the Conqueror; Belasius (Belsar)	Hereward the Wake; Sweyn Estrithson; Morcar Earl of Northumbria

The Ely Rebellion was a rebellion in 1069 or 1070 against the Norman occupation of England, named after the Isle of Ely. It is considered one of the earliest English civil wars.

== Rebellion ==
The Danish king Sweyn Estrithson sent a small army to try to establish a camp on the Isle of Ely. Hereward the Wake stormed and sacked Peterborough Abbey in company with local men and Sweyn's Danes. While the Gesta Herewardi says this was after the main battle at Ely, the Peterborough Chronicle says it was before. The historical consensus is that the Chronicle's account is most accurate. His justification is said to have been that he wished to save the Abbey's treasures and relics from the rapacious Normans led by the new Norman abbot who had ousted his uncle Brand. According to the Gesta he returned the treasures looted from the abbey after having a vision of Saint Peter. However, the Peterborough Chronicle says that the treasure was carried off to Denmark.

Hereward was then joined by a small army led by Morcar, the Saxon former Earl of Northumbria who had been ousted by William. William sent an army to deal with the rebels. In 1071, Hereward and Morcar were forced to retreat to their stronghold and made a desperate stand on the Isle of Ely against the Conqueror's rule. Both the Gesta Herewardi and the Liber Eliensis claim that the Normans made a frontal assault, aided by a huge, mile-long timber causeway, but that this sank under the weight of armour and horses. The Normans then tried to intimidate the English with a witch, who cursed them from a wooden tower, but Hereward managed to set a fire that toppled the tower with the witch in it. The Gesta includes other fantastical tales about Hereward's prowess, including disguising himself as a potter to spy on the king and escaping from captivity.

It is said that the Normans, probably led by one of William's knights named Belasius (Belsar), then bribed the monks of the island to reveal a safe route across the marshes, resulting in Ely's capture. An earlier hillfort now known as Belsar's Hill is still extant and sits astride the much older route known as Aldreth's Causeway, which would have been a direct route from the Isle of Ely to Cambridge.

== Aftermath ==
Morcar, it is said, surrendered himself on the assurance that the king would pardon him and receive him as a loyal friend. William, however, committed him to the custody of Roger de Beaumont, who kept him closely imprisoned in Normandy. Hereward is said to have escaped with some of his followers into the wild fenland and to have continued his resistance. This escape is noted in all the earliest surviving sources.

When the king was on his deathbed in 1087, he ordered that Morcar should be released, in common with others whom he had kept in prison in England and Normandy, on condition that they took an oath not to disturb the peace in either land. He was not long out of prison, for William Rufus took him to England, and on arriving at Winchester put him in prison there. Nothing further is known about him, and it is therefore probable that he died in prison.

== Location ==
An ancient earthwork about 1.2 miles (2 km) east of Willingham, Cambridgeshire is still visible at the junction of the old fen causeway and Iram Drove. This circular feature, known as Belsar's Hill, is a potential site for a fort, built by William, from which to attack Ely and Hereward. There were perhaps as few as four causeways onto the isle itself, with this being the southerly route from London and the likely route of William's army.
