= Excalibur =

Legendary sword of King Arthur

- Matter of Britain element
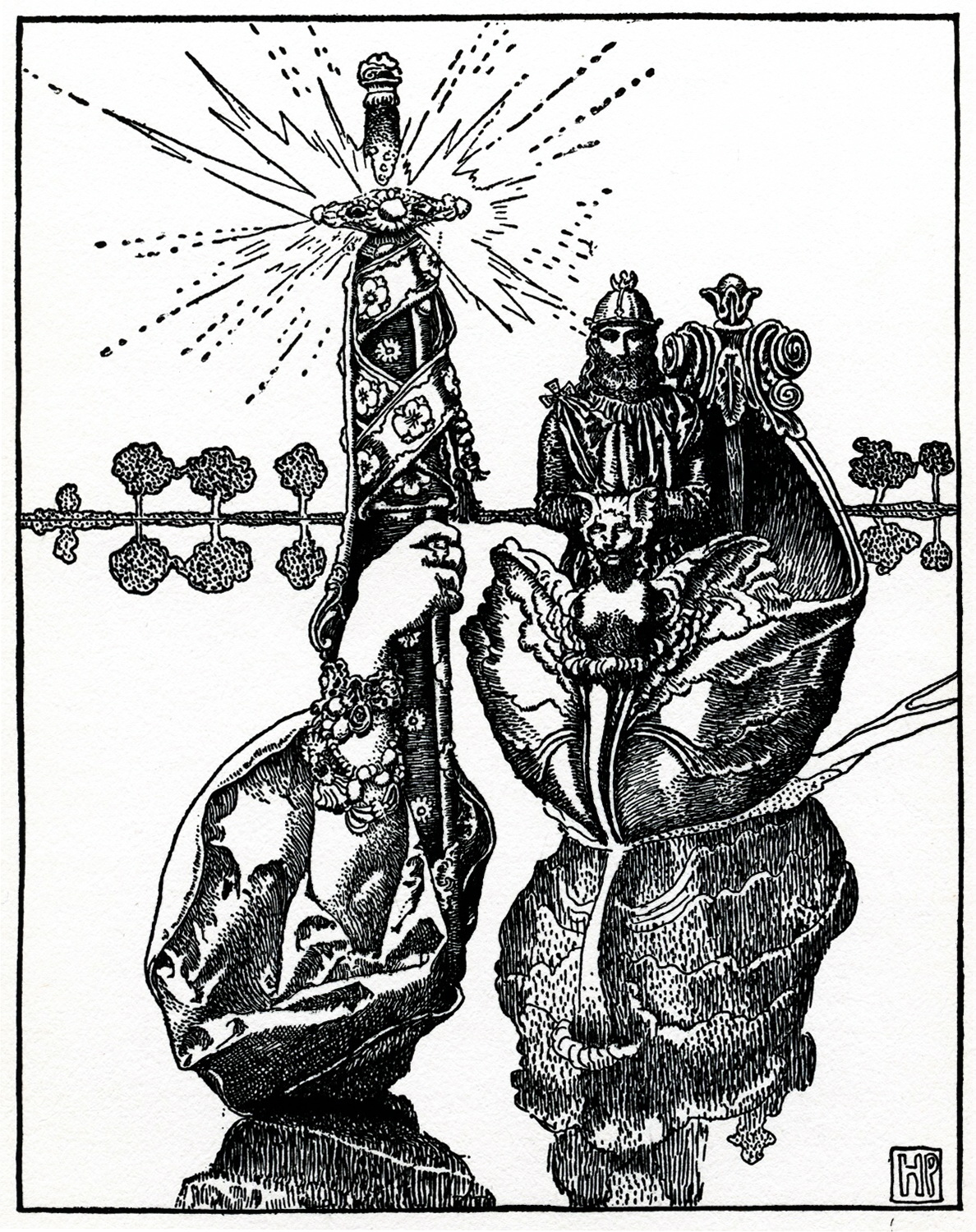
- Excalibur the Sword by Howard Pyle (1903)

In-universe information
- Type: Legendary sword
- Owners: King Arthur, Merlin, Lady of the Lake, Morgan, Bedivere, Griflet, Gawain
- Function: Proof of Arthur's divine right, magic weapon, ritual item
- Affiliation: Avalon

Excalibur is the mythical sword of King Arthur that was purported to possess magical powers and be associated with the rightful sovereignty of Britain. Its first reliably datable appearance is found in Geoffrey of Monmouth's Historia Regum Britanniae. Excalibur as the "sword in the stone" functioning as the proof of Arthur's lineage is an iconic motif featured throughout most works dealing with Arthur's youth since its introduction in Robert de Boron's Merlin. The sword given to the young Arthur by the Lady of the Lake in the tradition that began soon afterwards with the Post-Vulgate Cycle is not the same weapon, but in Thomas Malory’s Le Morte d'Arthur they share the name of Excalibur. Several similar swords and other weapons also appear within Arthurian texts, as well as in other legends.

== Forms and etymology ==
The name Excalibur possibly derives from the Welsh Caledfwlch (Breton Kaledvoulc'h, Middle Cornish Calesvol), which is a compound of caled, 'hard', and bwlch, 'breach, cleft'. Caledfwlch appears in several early Welsh works, including the prose tale Culhwch and Olwen (c. 11th–12th century). The name was later used in Welsh adaptations of foreign material such as the Bruts (chronicles), which were based on Geoffrey of Monmouth. It is often considered to be related to the phonetically similar Caladbolg, a sword borne by several figures from Irish mythology, although a borrowing of Caledfwlch from the Irish Caladbolg has been considered unlikely by Rachel Bromwich and D. Simon Evans. They suggest instead that both names "may have similarly arisen at a very early date as generic names for a sword". In the late 15th to early 16th-century Middle Cornish play Beunans Ke, Arthur's sword is called Calesvol, which is etymologically an exact Middle Cornish cognate of the Welsh Caledfwlch. It is unclear if the name was borrowed from the Welsh (if so, it must have been an early loan, for phonological reasons), or represents an early, pan-Brittonic traditional name for Arthur's sword.

Geoffrey of Monmouth, in his Latin chronicle Historia Regum Britanniae (The History of the Kings of Britain, c. 1136), Latinised the name of Arthur's sword as Caliburnus (possibly influenced by the Medieval Latin spelling calibs of Classical Latin chalybs, from the Greek chályps (χάλυψ), 'steel'). Most Celticists consider Geoffrey's Caliburnus to be derivative of a lost Old Welsh text in which bwlch (Old Welsh bulc[h]) had not yet been lenited to fwlch (Middle Welsh vwlch or uwlch). Geoffrey Gaimar, in his Old French chronicle Estoire des Engleis (1134–1140), mentions Arthur and his sword: "this Constantine was the nephew of Arthur, who had the sword Caliburc" ("Cil Costentin, li niès Artur, Ki out l'espée Caliburc"). In Wace's Roman de Brut (c. 1150–1155), composed in Old French, the sword is called Caliburn (Chaliburne, Caliburne, Calibuerne), (Note: Chaliburne v. 9279, Caliburne v. 10083 Caliburn 11547 Calibuerne 12891 12910 12926.) (Note: Ivor Arnold's edition uses 22 manuscripts including fragments, and as to base text, considers the continental N (BnF français 1454) best, and D (Durham, Cathedral Library, C. IV. 27) and P (Penrose) best among the insular (Anglo-Norman) copies.) Calabrum, Callibourc, Calabrun, Chalabrun, (Note: Zimmer omits "Chalabrun" counting it as inclusive in 3 occurrences of "Calabrun ".) and Escalibor (with additional variant spellings such as Chalabrum, Calibore, Callibor, Caliborne, Calliborc, Escallibore (Note: Misspelt "Escaliborc" (at v. 13330) by Zimmer.) found in various continental manuscripts). (Note: Le Roux de Lincy relied on continental manuscripts, but there were insular (Anglo-Norman) copies as well.) Various other spellings in the later medieval Arthurian literature have included Calibourch, Calibourn, Calibourne, Caliburc, Escaliber, Escalibur, Excalibor, and finally the familiar Excalibur.

== Legend ==
=== The Sword in the Stone and the Sword in the Lake ===
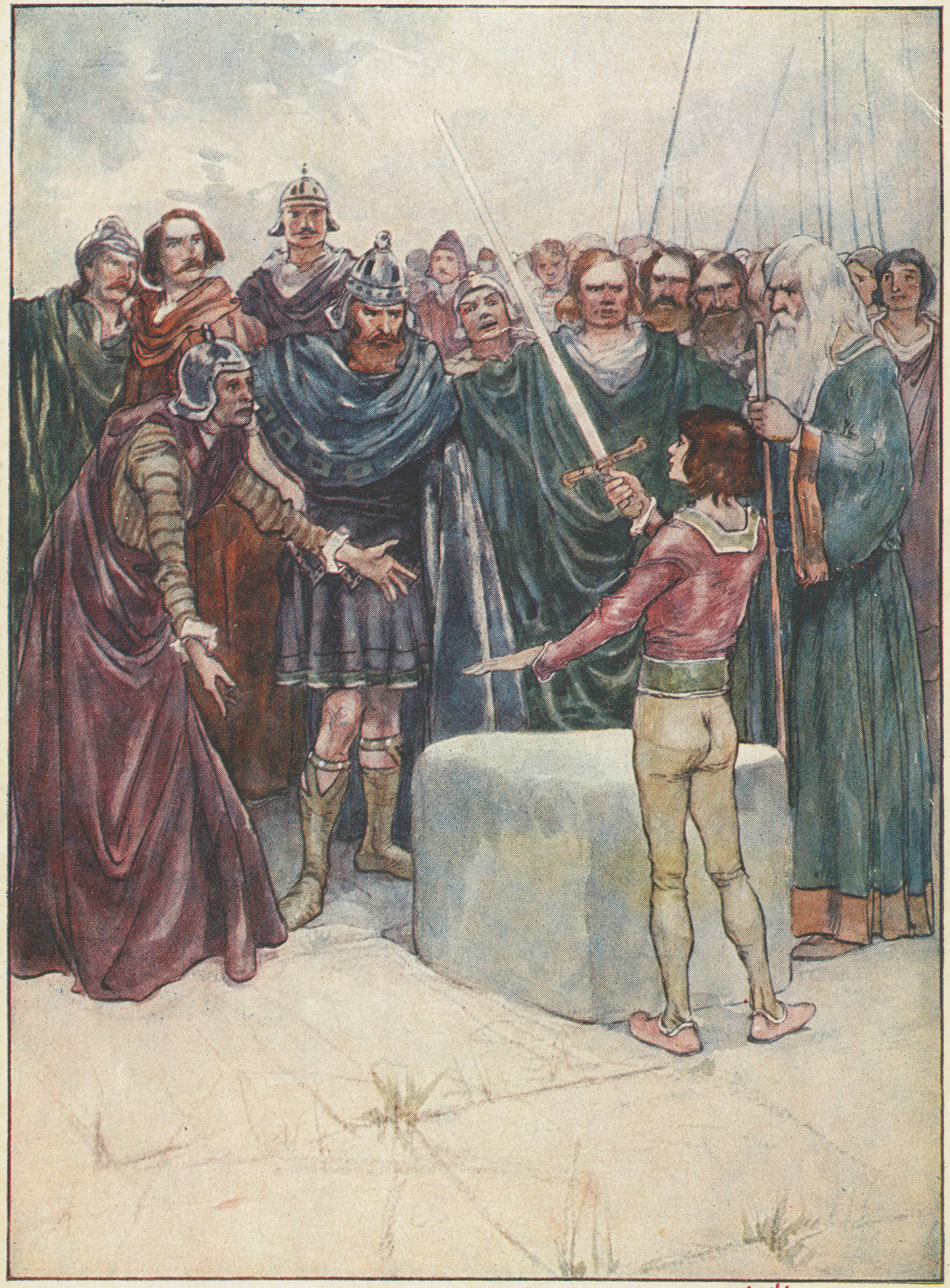
The young Arthur draws the sword from the stone in Henrietta Elizabeth Marshall's Our Island Story (1906). Here, as in many more modern depictions of this scene, there is no anvil and the sword is lodged directly within the stone itself.

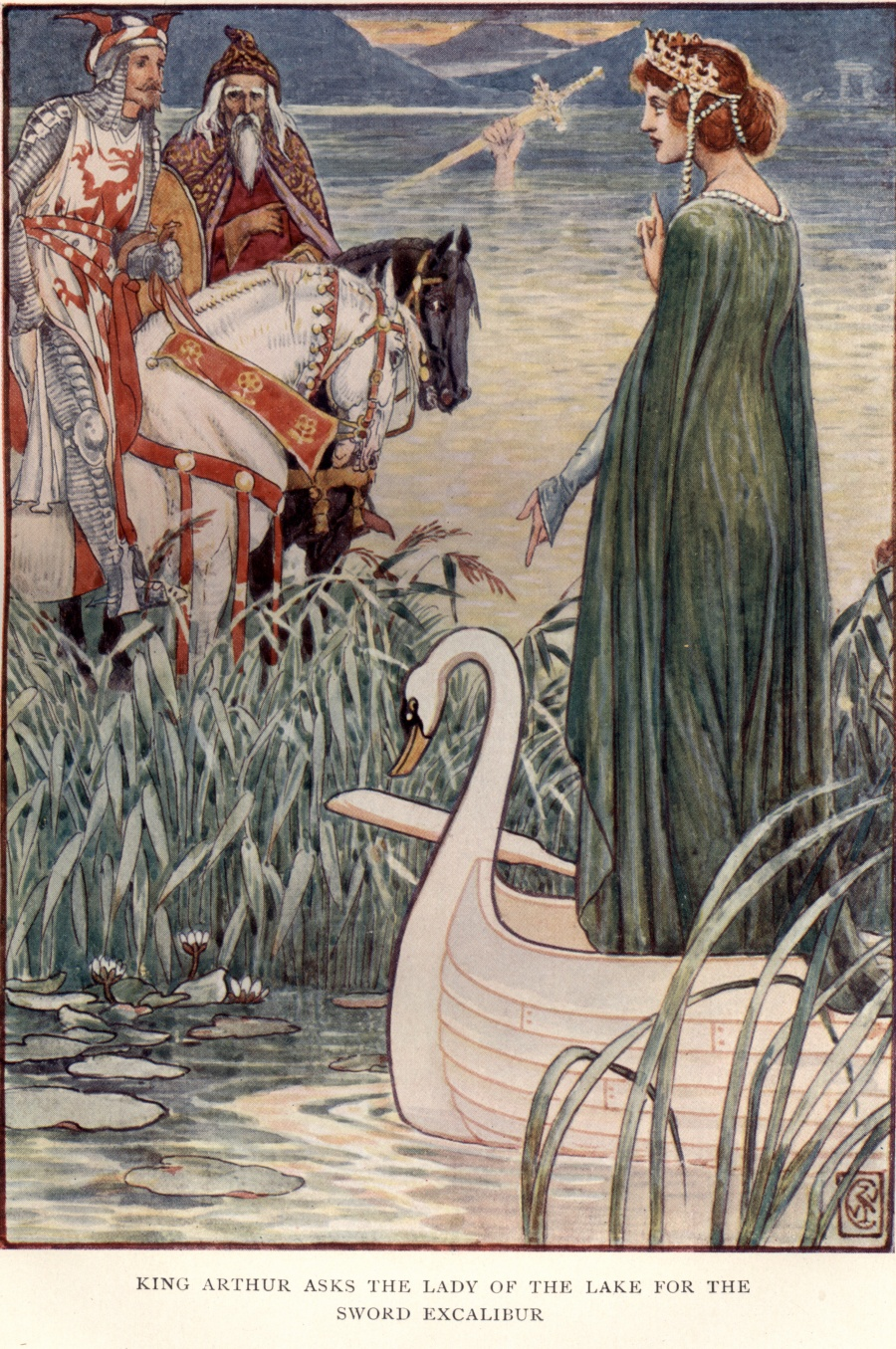
"King Arthur asks the Lady of the Lake for the sword Excalibur". Walter Crane's 1845 illustration in King Arthur's Knights: The Tales Retold for Boys and Girls, adapted from Malory by Henry Gilbert.

Romance tradition elaborates on how Arthur pulled out Excalibur. In Robert de Boron's c. 1200 French poem Merlin, the first known tale to mention the "sword in the stone" motif, Arthur obtained the British throne by pulling a sword from an anvil sitting atop a stone that appeared in a churchyard on Christmas Eve. In this account, as foretold by Merlin, the act could not be performed except by "the true king", meaning the divinely appointed king or true heir of Uther Pendragon. (As Thomas Malory related in his 15th-century Middle English Arthurian compilation, Le Morte d'Arthur, "whoso pulleth out this sword of this stone and anvil, is rightwise king born of all England.") (Note: This line from Malory is also quoted in the 1938 Arthurian novel The Sword in the Stone by British author T. H. White as well as its Disney adaptation.) The scene is set by different authors at either explicitly London (historical Londinium) or generally in the land of Logres (which can be a city and also associated with London), and might have been inspired by a miracle attributed to the 11th-century bishop Wulfstan of Worcester.

After many of the gathered nobles try and fail to complete Merlin's challenge, the teenage Arthur, who up to this point had believed himself to be the biological son of Ector and had gone there as a squire to his foster brother Kay, succeeds effortlessly. Arthur first achieves this feat by accident while unaware of the contest and unseen. He then returns the sword to its place in the anvil on a stone, and later repeats the act publicly as Merlin comes to announce his true parentage.

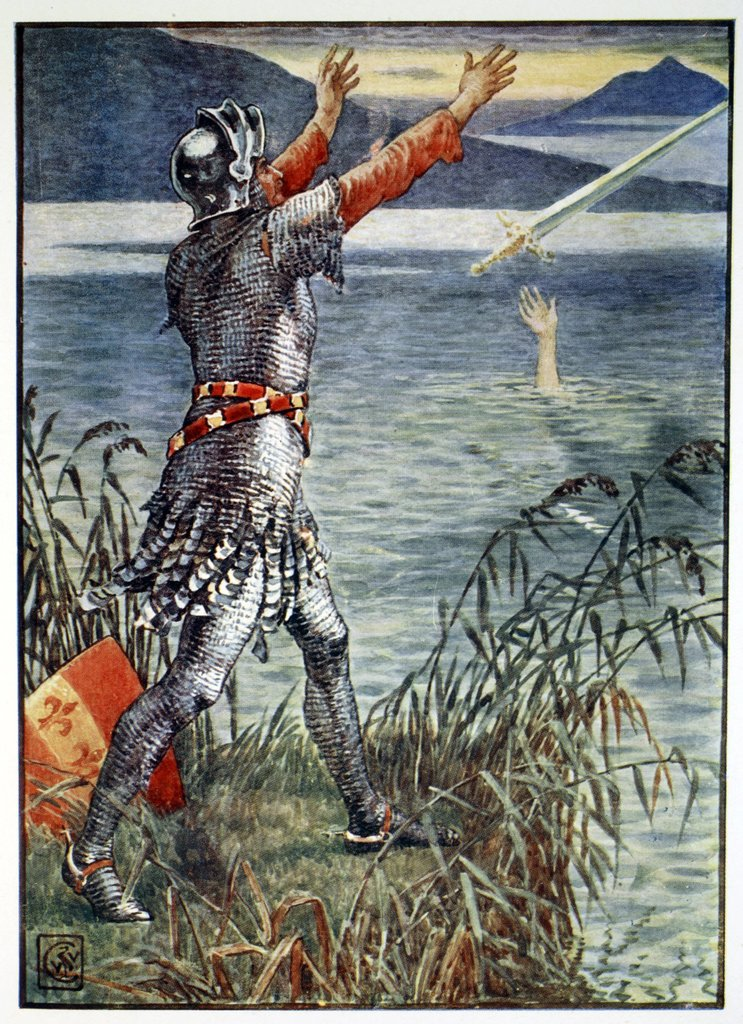
Sir Bedivere throwing Excalibur into the lake in an illustration by Walter Crane: "There came an arm and a hand above the water."

The identity of this sword as Excalibur is made explicit in the Prose Merlin, a part of the thirteenth-century Lancelot-Grail cycle of French romances also known as the Vulgate Cycle. Eventually, in the cycle's finale Vulgate Mort Artu, when Arthur is at the brink of death, he enigmatically orders his surviving knight Griflet to cast Excalibur into a nearby lake. After two failed attempts to deceive Arthur, since Griflet felt that such a great sword should not be thrown away, he finally does comply with the wounded king's request. A woman's hand emerges from the lake to catch Excalibur, after which Morgan appears in a boat to take Arthur to Avalon. This motif then became attached to Bedivere (or Yvain in the chronicle Scalacronica), instead of Griflet, in the English Arthurian tradition.

However, in the subsequent Post-Vulgate Cycle variants of the Merlin and the Merlin Continuation, written soon afterwards, Arthur's sword drawn from the stone is unnamed. Furthermore, the young Arthur promptly breaks it in his duel against King Pellinore very early in his reign. On Merlin's advice, Arthur then goes with him to be given the actual Excalibur by a Lady of the Lake in exchange for a later boon for her (some time later, she arrives at Arthur's court to demand the head of Balin). In the Post-Vulgate Mort Artu, it is this sword that is eventually hurled into the pool at Camlann (or actually Salisbury Plain where both cycles locate the battle, as do the English romances) by Griflet in the same circumstances as told in the story's Vulgate version. Malory included both of these stories in his now-iconic Le Morte d'Arthur while naming each of the swords as Excalibur: both the first one (from the stone), soon shattered in combat in a story taken from the Post-Vulgate Merlin Continuation, and its replacement (from the lake), returned by Bedivere in the end.

=== Other roles and attributes ===
In the Welsh tales, Arthur's sword is known as Caledfwlch. In Culhwch and Olwen, it is one of Arthur's most valuable possessions and is used by Arthur's warrior Llenlleawg the Irishman to kill the Irish king Diwrnach while stealing his magical cauldron. Though not named as Caledfwlch, Arthur's sword is described vividly in The Dream of Rhonabwy, one of the tales associated with the Mabinogion (as translated by Jeffrey Gantz): "Then they heard Cadwr Earl of Cornwall being summoned, and saw him rise with Arthur's sword in his hand, with a design of two chimeras on the golden hilt; when the sword was unsheathed what was seen from the mouths of the two chimeras was like two flames of fire, so dreadful that it was not easy for anyone to look." (Note: Nineteenth-century poet Alfred, Lord Tennyson, described the sword in full Romantic detail in his poem "Morte d'Arthur", later rewritten as "The Passing of Arthur", one of the Idylls of the King: "There drew he forth the brand Excalibur, / And o'er him, drawing it, the winter moon, / Brightening the skirts of a long cloud, ran forth / And sparkled keen with frost against the hilt / For all the haft twinkled with diamond sparks, / Myriads of topaz-lights, and jacinth-work / Of subtlest jewellery." In "The Coming of Arthur", Tennyson also described Excalibur's blade as engraved with two phrases on opposite sides, "Take me!" and "Cast me away!".)

Geoffrey's Historia is the first non-Welsh text to speak of the sword. Geoffrey says the sword was forged in Avalon and Latinises the name Caledfwlch as Caliburnus. When his influential pseudo-history made it to continental Europe, writers altered the name further until it finally took on the popular form Excalibur. Its role was expanded upon in the Vulgate Cycle as well as in the Post-Vulgate Cycle which emerged in its wake. Both of these prose cycles incorporated the Prose Merlin, but the Post-Vulgate authors left out the original Merlin continuation from the earlier cycle, choosing to add an original account of Arthur's early days that includes a new origin for Excalibur.

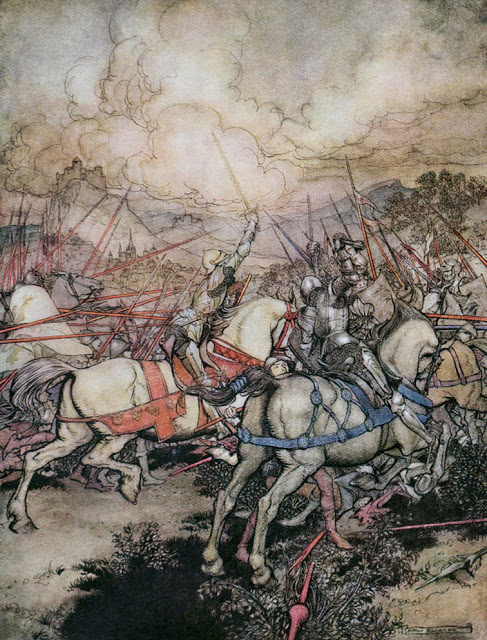
Arthur Rackham's illustration for Alfred W. Pollard's The Romance of King Arthur, abridged from Thomas Malory's 15th-century Le Morte d'Arthur

In Chrétien de Troyes' late 12th-century Old French Perceval, Arthur's nephew and best knight Gawain carries Excalibur, "for at his belt hung Escalibor, the finest sword that there was, which sliced through iron as through wood" ("Qu'il avoit cainte Escalibor, la meillor espee qui fust, qu'ele trenche fer come fust"). This statement was probably picked up by the author of the Estoire Merlin, or Vulgate Merlin, where the author asserts that Escalibor "is a Hebrew name which means in French 'cuts iron, steel, and wood'" ("c'est non Ebrieu qui dist en franchois trenche fer & achier et fust"; the word for 'steel', achier, also means 'blade' or 'sword' and is from the medieval Latin aciarium, a derivative of acies ['sharp']). It is from this fanciful etymological musing that Thomas Malory got the notion that Excalibur meant 'cut steel', writing: "'the name of it,' said the lady, 'is Excalibur, that is as moche to say, as cut stele'". In addition, it was said by Malory and his sources that when Arthur first drew Excalibur in combat (testing his sovereignty), its blade shone so bright that it blinded his enemies.

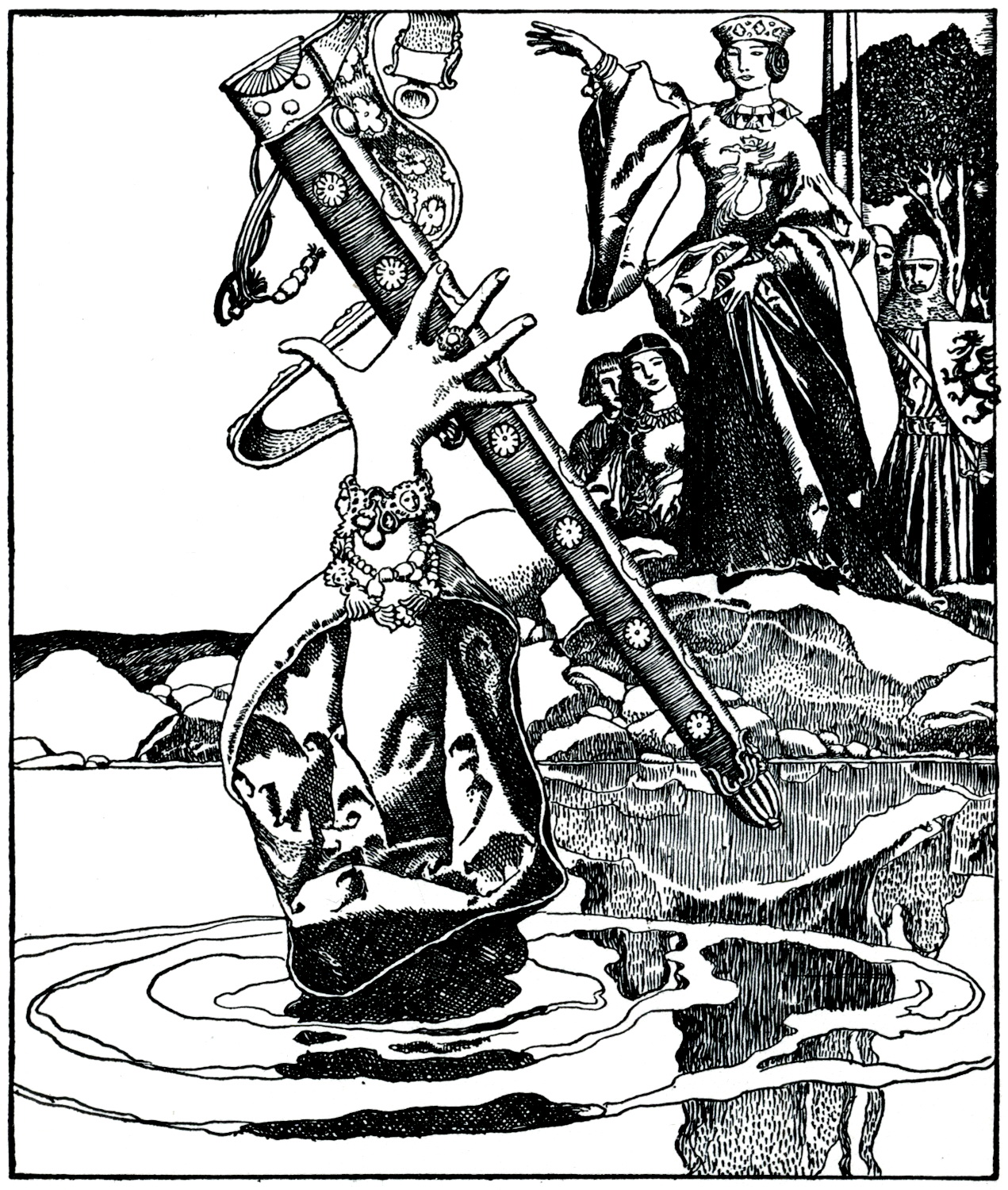
"Queen Morgana Loses Excalibur His Sheath." Howard Pyle's illustration for The Story of King Arthur and His Knights (1903)

In the Post-Vulgate version (used in Malory's Le Morte d'Arthur for the second Excalibur), the sword's scabbard is also said to have powers of its own, as any wounds received while wearing it would not bleed at all, thus preventing the wearer from ever bleeding to death in battle. For this reason, Merlin chides Arthur for preferring Excalibur over its sheath, saying that the latter is the greater treasure. The scabbard is, however, soon stolen from Arthur by his half-sister Morgan le Fay in revenge for the death of her beloved Accolon, he having been slain by Arthur with Excalibur in a duel involving a false Excalibur (Morgan also secretly makes at least one duplicate of Excalibur during the time when the sword is entrusted to her by Arthur earlier in the different French, Iberian and English variants of that story). During Morgan's flight from the pursuit by Arthur, the sheath is then thrown by her into a deep lake and lost. This act later enables the death of Arthur, deprived of its magical protection, many years later in his final battle. In Malory's telling, the scabbard is never found again. In the Post-Vulgate, however, it is recovered and claimed by another fay, Marsique, who then briefly gives it to Gawain to help him fight Naborn the Enchanter (a Mabon figure).

As mentioned above, Excalibur is wielded also by Gawain in some French romances, including the Vulgate Lancelot. The Prose Merlin also uniquely tells of Gawain killing the Roman leader Lucius with Excalibur. This is, however, in contrast to most versions, where Excalibur belongs solely to Arthur. A few texts, such as the English Alliterative Morte Arthure and one copy of the Welsh Ymddiddan Arthur a'r Eryr, tell of Arthur using Excalibur to kill his son Mordred (in the first of these, he also uses it to kill Lucius). In the Iberian post-Arthurian romance Florambel de Lucea, Morgan later gifts Excalibur (Esclariber) to the eponymous hero. Another late Iberian romance, Tirant lo Blanch, features Arthur who was brought back to life by Morgan and then wandered the world for a long time while mad and able to talk only when having Excalibur in his hands. Finally, Morgan finds her brother imprisoned in the contemporary (15th-century) Constantinople, where she restores him to his mind by making him gaze upon his reflection in Excalibur's blade. In Perceforest, the sword is described as having originally belonged to Priam and then taken by Cassandra after the fall of Troy. "The Sword in the Stone" story in Perceforest tells how it had ended up embedded in the 'Great Stone' centuries before the time of Arthur.

== Connections and analogues ==
=== Similar weapons ===
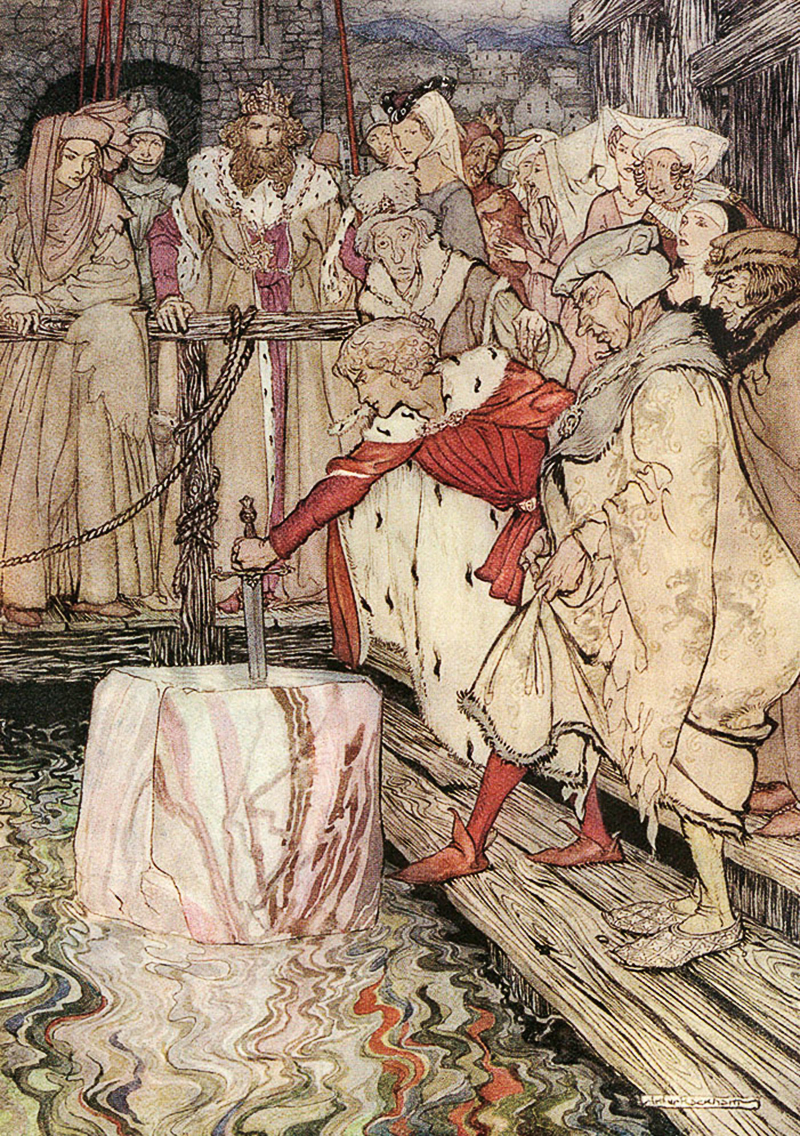
"How Galahad drew out the sword from the floating stone at Camelot." Rackham's illustration for Pollard's The Romance of King Arthur (1917)

The challenge of drawing a sword from a stone also appears in the later Arthurian story of Galahad, whose achievement of the task indicates that he is destined to find the Holy Grail, as also foretold in Merlin's prophecies. This powerful yet cursed weapon, known as the Adventurous Sword among other names, has also come from Avalon. In the Post-Vulgate (and Malory), it is first both drawn from its scabbard in a contest and promptly stolen by Balin, who then wields it until his death when he uses it to kill his own brother. In this version, it is later briefly taken up by Galahad, who pulls it from a stone floating on the river just outside Camelot, and eventually is used by Lancelot to give his former friend Gawain a mortal wound in their long final duel. In Perlesvaus, Lancelot pulls a spear from stone pedestal. In the Post-Vulgate Merlin (and Malory), Morgan creates the copies of Excalibur itself as well as of its scabbard.

In Welsh mythology, the Dyrnwyn ("White-Hilt"), one of the Thirteen Treasures of the Island of Britain, is said to be a powerful sword belonging to Rhydderch Hael, one of the Three Generous Men of Britain mentioned in the Welsh Triads. When drawn by a worthy or well-born man, the entire blade would blaze with fire. Rhydderch was never reluctant to hand the weapon to anyone, hence his nickname Hael "the Generous", but the recipients, as soon as they had learned of its peculiar properties, always rejected the sword. There are other similar weapons described in other mythologies as well. Irish mythology features Caladbolg, the sword of Fergus mac Róich, which was also known for its incredible power and was carried by some of Ireland's greatest heroes. The name, which can also mean "hard cleft" in Irish, appears in the plural, caladbuilc, as a generic term for "great swords" in Togail Troi ("The Destruction of Troy"), a 10th-century Irish translation of the classical tale. A sword named Claíomh Solais, which is an Irish term meaning "sword of light", or "shining sword", appears in a number of orally transmitted Irish folk-tales. The Sword in the Stone has an analogue in some versions of the story of Sigurd, whose father, Sigmund, draws the sword Gram out of the tree Barnstokkr where it is embedded by the Norse god Odin. Apart from legendary swords, the only real ancient Sword in the Stone which still exists nowadays is kept since the medieval ages in the Chapel of Saint Galgano at Montesiepi in Tuscany, Italy; it is associated with the 12th-century Italian legend of that saint in the tale of "Tuscany's Excalibur".

=== Arthur's other weapons ===
A number of different swords and other weapons have been also associated with Arthur. In the Alliterative Morte Arthure, Clarent is the royal sword of peace meant for knighting and ceremonies as opposed to battle. Guinevere steals it for Mordred, who then uses it to kill Arthur at Camlann. The Prose Lancelot of the Vulgate Cycle mentions a sword called Sequence (also Secace or Seure) as borrowed from Arthur by Lancelot. In the Vulgate Merlin, Arthur captures Marmiadoise (Marmydoyse), the marvellous sword of Hercules, from the latter's descendant King Rions. Marmiadoise's powers (such as causing wounds that would never heal) are so superior to those of Excalibur that Arthur gives Excalibur to Gawain.

Early-Arthurian Welsh tradition knew of a dagger named Carnwennan and a spear named Rhongomyniad that belonged to him. Carnwennan ("little white-hilt") first appears in Culhwch and Olwen, where Arthur uses it to slice the witch Orddu in half. Rhongomyniad ("spear" + "striker, slayer") is also mentioned in Culhwch, although only in passing; it appears as simply Ron ("spear") in Geoffrey's Historia. Geoffrey also names Arthur's shield as Pridwen; in Culhwch, however, Prydwen ("fair face") is the name of Arthur's ship while his shield is named Wynebgwrthucher ("face of evening").

== Excalibur as a relic ==
Historically, a sword identified as Excalibur (Caliburn) was supposedly discovered during the exhumation of Arthur's purported grave at Glastonbury Abbey in 1191. On 6 March 1191, after the Treaty of Messina, either this or another claimed Excalibur was given as a gift of goodwill by the English king Richard I of England (Richard the Lionheart) to his ally Tancred, King of Sicily. It was one of a series of symbolic Arthurian acts by the Anglo-Norman monarchs, such as their association of the crown of King Arthur with the crown they won from the slain Welsh prince Llywelyn ap Gruffudd.

== See also ==
- List of magical weapons
