= Joseph Sparke =

British antiquarian

Joseph Sparke or Sparkes (1683–1740) was an English antiquary, editor of some significant chronicles.

== Life ==
Joseph Sparke was the son of John Sparke or Sparkes of Peterborough. He received his early education in the city under a schoolmaster named Warren, and was admitted as a pensioner of St John's College, Cambridge on 11 July 1699, graduating B.A. in 1704. After returning to Peterborough, he was appointed registrar of Peterborough Cathedral. Sparke devoted considerable time to antiquarian and bibliographical pursuits. In 1719, he was mentioned in a letter from Maurice Johnson to William Stukeley as having recently reorganised the library of Lord Cardigan at Dean, Northamptonshire, according to a new arrangement. He also undertook the care of White Kennett’s extensive collection of early historical and theological documents, which had been transferred to the cathedral library, and was tasked with supplying and enlarging the collection on a daily basis. Kennett’s biographer, William Newton, described Sparke as “of very good literature and very able to assist in that good design.” Together with his associate Timothy Neve, Sparke founded the Gentleman's Society of Peterborough and secured permission from Bishop Robert Clavering for the society to meet in a room above the Saxon gatehouse. By October 1722, he had also become a member of the Spalding Gentlemen's Society, upon which the Peterborough society was modelled. Sparke died on 20 July 1740 and was buried in Peterborough Cathedral, where a monument to him stands in the retro-choir. His wife, Rebecca, died on 27 March 1747 at the age of 56.

== Works ==
In 1723 he edited two folio volumes entitled Historiæ Anglicanæ Scriptores varii, e codicibus manuscriptis, of which both large and small paper editions were published. They contained the Chronicon Angliae Petriburgense, which later was attributed erroneously to John, abbot of Peterborough (1250–1262), by Simon Patrick and Henry Wharton. This was printed by Sparke from a transcript furnished to him by John Bridges of Lincoln's Inn, and, not having been collated with the original (among the Cotton. MSS. in the British Museum), contains errors. It was re-edited in 1845 for the Caxton Society by John Allen Giles. The Historiæ Anglicanæ Scriptores included also William Fitzstephen's Life of St. Thomas Becket, the History of Peterborough Abbey by Hugh Candidus, Walter of Guisborough's Vita Eduardi, and the chronicles of Ralph of Coggeshall, Benedict of Peterborough, and others. Another volume contemplated by Sparke was to contain Whittleseye's Hereward of Peterborough.
