= Chronicon Angliae Petriburgense =

Fourteenth-century chronicle

The Chronicon Angliae Petriburgense is a 14th-century chronicle written in Medieval Latin at Peterborough Abbey, England. It covers events from 604 to 1368, although the original medieval portion concludes with an entry for 868; the later continuation was added in the 17th century. (Note: The Latin title translates as "Peterborough chronicle of England".) The text survives within a composite manuscript volume in the British Library, shelfmark Cotton Claudius A. v, where it occupies folios 2–45. An early printed edition appeared in 1723, prepared by Joseph Sparke as part of a collection of English historical works.

== Attribution and manuscript notes ==
In the preface to his 1845 edition for the Caxton Society, John Allen Giles reported that both Simon Patrick and Henry Wharton attributed the Chronicon to John of Caleto (or "Caux"), who served as Abbot of Peterborough from 1250 to 1262. (Note: Patrick’s attribution appears in his preface to Gunton 1968. Gunton illustrates the identification of "Caleto" with Caux: "He gave also a great bell to [Peterborough Abbey], whereon was written, 'Johannes de Caux Abbas Oswaldo consecrat hoc vas'".) Giles noted that the manuscript contains a marginal note attributing the work to Abbot John, together with an ownership inscription at the opening of the text stating that the book belonged to Peterborough Abbey. (Note: The attribution to Abbot John appears above an inscription reading: "Iste liber pertinet ad monasterium de burgo sancti petri Anno Domini DCliiii Amen" ("This book belongs to the monastery of Peterborough AD 654 Amen"). The inscription forms the first line of the chronicle.) Giles regarded these attributions as relatively late additions and considered the true authorship uncertain. Scholarly opinion has varied: Thomas Duffus Hardy described the Chronicon as "enveloped in a mystery" regarding its authorship, while Antonia Gransden accepted without reservation the ascription to "John of Peterborough". Writing in the Dictionary of National Biography, Edmund King cautioned that "John de Caux is not to be identified with the John of Peterborough said to have written or owned the Peterborough–Spalding annals in BL, Cotton MS Claudius A. v. fols. 2–45."

== Assessment ==
Although the authorship remains debated, Giles considered the Chronicon to be a valuable compilation for the extensive chronological span it covers and the substantial number of historical notices it preserves.

== Bibliography ==
- Giles, J.A., ed. (1845), Chronicon Angliae Petriburgense, Caxton Society, OCLC 457850797
- Gransden, A. (1996), Historical Writing in England c. 550–c. 1307, Routledge, ISBN 0-415-15124-4
- Gunton, S. (1968) [1686], The History of the Church of Peterburgh: Wherein the Most Remarkable Things Concerning That Place, From the First Foundation Thereof, With other Passages of History, Not Unworthy Publick View, Are Represented, Chiswell, OCLC 933181943, archived from the original on 21 November 2018
- Hardy, T.D., ed. (1871), Descriptive Catalogue of Materials Relating to the History of Great Britain and Ireland to the End of the Reign of Henry VII Volume 3: From A.D. 1200 to A.D. 1327, Longmans, ISBN 9781108042789, OCLC 271081116
- Sparke, J., ed. (1723), Historiae Anglicanae Scriptores Varii, E Codicibus Manuscriptis Nunc Primum Editi, Bowyer, OCLC 931323645
