= Benjamin Ray (antiquary) =

English antiquarian

- Born: 1704; Spalding, Lincolnshire
- Died: 26 August 1760 (aged 55–56)
- Occupation: Antiquarian

Benjamin Ray (1704 – 26 August 1760) was an English antiquarian.

== Biography ==
Ray was the son of Joseph Ray, merchant, and a kinsman of Maurice Johnson. He was born in 1704 at Spalding, Lincolnshire, where he was educated under Timothy Neve. He afterwards proceeded to St. John's College, Cambridge, where he was admitted a pensioner on 10 October 1721, being then ‘aged 17,’ and graduated B.A. in 1725 and M.A. in 1730. After leaving the university he took orders, and became perpetual curate of Cowbit and Surfleet, Lincolnshire. From 1723 to 1736, he was master of the grammar school at Sleaford, where he also held a curacy. Ray was a member of the well-known ‘Gentlemen's Society’ of Spalding, to which Newton, Pope, Bentley, and Gay sometime belonged [see Johnson, Maurice]. He was secretary in 1735, and afterwards vice-president, and exhibited at meetings of the society many antiquities of great value and interest (Stukeley, Diaries and Letters, Surtees Soc. iii. 125, 126, ii. 306). He communicated a paper by himself on ‘The Truth of the Christian Religion demonstrated from the Report propagated throughout the Gentile world about the birth of Christ, that a Messiah was expected, and from the authority of Heathen Writers, and from the Coins of the Roman Emperors.’ It was not printed. To the Royal Society Ray sent ‘Account of a Waterspout raised upon Land in Lincolnshire’ (Phil. Trans. Abr. 1751, x. 271), which Maurice Johnson described to Dr. Birch as ‘the most remarkable phenomenon communicated to us since Newton's time.’ Ray was also an authority upon coins (Gent. Mag. 1757, p. 499). He died unmarried at Spalding on 26 Aug. 1760. He is described as a ‘most ingenious and worthy man, possessed of good learning, but ignorant of the world, indolent and thoughtless, and often very absent.’ Some amusing instances of his absence of mind were communicated to Nichols by his friend, Samuel Pegge (Illustr. of Lit. viii. 548).
