= Rhongomyniad =

Spear of King Arthur

- Arthurian legend element
- First appearance: Welsh Triads
- Genre: Fantasy

In-universe information
- Type: Fictional spear
- Owners: King Arthur

Rhongomyniad, or Rhongomiant (variously translated as "Slaying Spear," "Cutting Spear" or "Striking Spear"), was the spear of King Arthur in the Welsh Arthurian legends. Unlike Arthur’s two other weapons, his sword Caledfwlch and his dagger Carnwennan, Rhongomyniad has no apparent magical powers.

In Culhwch and Olwen, Arthur names it as one of the few things in the world which he will not give to Culhwch. In the Welsh Triads, Rhongomyniad is listed alongside Arthur's sword Caledfwlch and Arthur's dagger Carnwennan as sacred weapons given to him by God: "the sacred weapons that God had given him: Rhongomiant his spear, Caledfwlch a sword, and Carnwennan his dagger".

In the Historia Regum Britanniae, Geoffrey of Monmouth calls Arthur's lance Ron, presumably an abbreviation of the original Welsh name. Layamon also calls it this in his Brut. Geoffrey states that Arthur carried this lance with him at the Battle of Mount Badon. Layamon states in a passage (without naming the weapon) that Arthur's spear was forged in Carmarthen by a smith called Griffin. He also adds that it formerly belonged to Uther Pendragon.
