= Carnwennan =

Dagger of King Arthur in Welsh Arthurian legends

- Arthurian legend element
- First appearance: Welsh Triads
- Genre: Fantasy

In-universe information
- Type: Fictional dagger
- Owners: King Arthur

Carnwennan ("Little White Hilt") was the dagger of King Arthur in the Welsh Arthurian legends.

In Culhwch and Olwen, Arthur names it as one of the few things in the world which he will not give to Culhwch. Later, he uses it to slay the witch Orddu, the daughter of the witch Orwen, by slicing her in half. In the Welsh Triads, Carnwennan is listed alongside Arthur's spear Rhongomyniad and Arthur's sword Caledfwlch as sacred weapons given to him by God: "the sacred weapons that God had given him: Rhongomiant his spear, Caledfwlch a sword, and Carnwennan his dagger" (Bromwich's translation).

Carnwennan is exclusive to the Welsh traditions of Arthur. Geoffrey of Monmouth's Historia Regum Britanniae excludes it, though it mentions the sword Caliburn (a Latinization of Caledfwlch) and the lance Ron (likely an abbreviation of Rhongomyniad). In Thomas Malory's Le Morte d'Arthur, Arthur has a dagger which he uses to kill a giant, but it is not named.

Its name is sometimes given as "Carnwenhau" which comes from mistaken transcriptions of the handwritten texts.
