= Thomas Wright (antiquarian) =

English writer, scholar, and antiquarian (1810–1877)

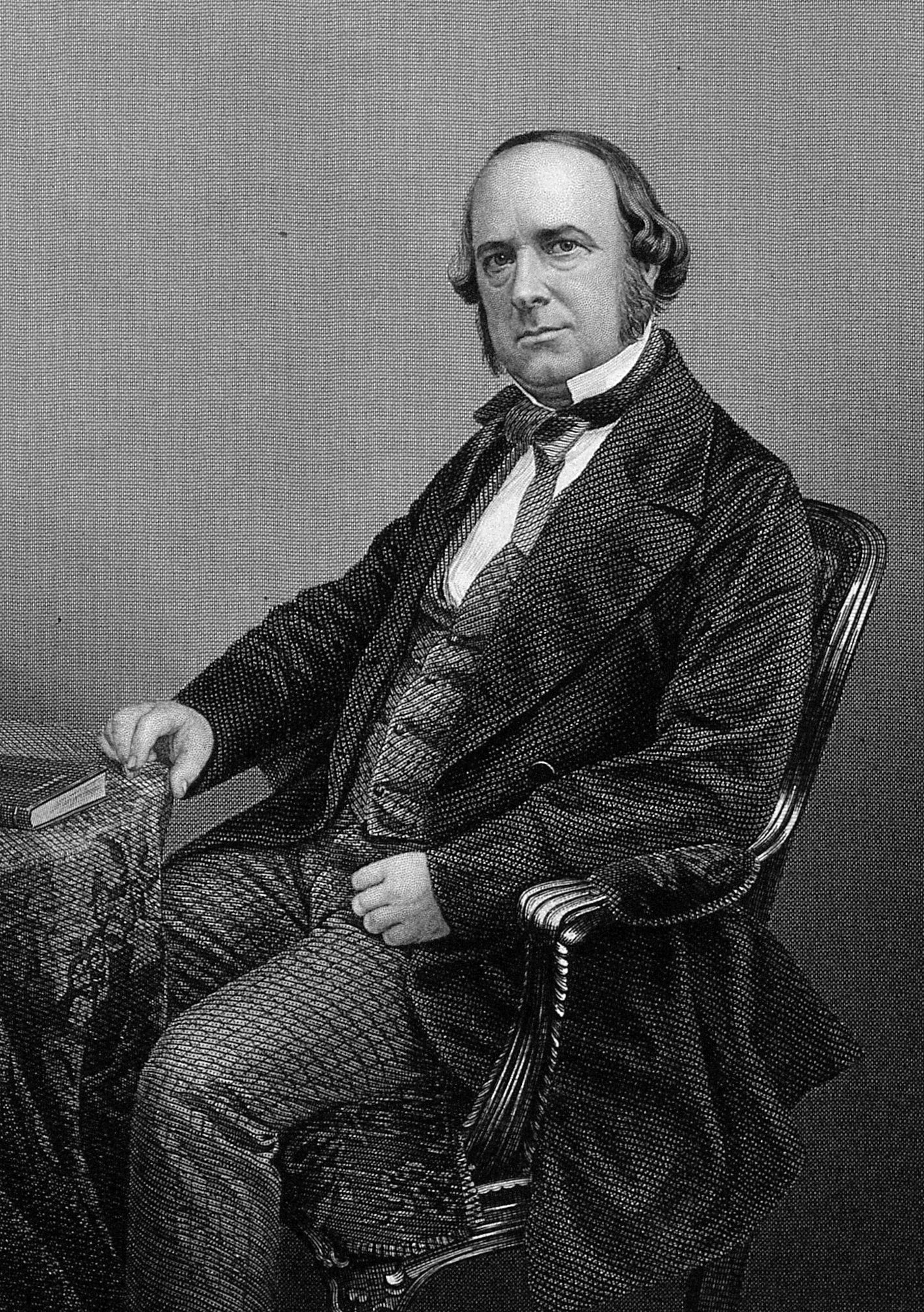
- Wright in 1859
- Born: 23 April 1810; Worcestershire, England
- Died: 23 December 1877 (aged 67); London, England
- Resting place: Brompton Cemetery
- Education: Trinity College, Cambridge
- Occupations: Writer; scholar

Thomas Wright (23 April 1810 – 23 December 1877) was an English writer, scholar, and antiquarian. He was a prolific writer and an editor of medieval texts. He was also one of the founding members of the British Archaeological Association, which remains active to this day.

== Life ==
Wright was born near Ludlow at Tenbury Wells, Worcestershire descended from a Quaker family formerly living at Bradford. He was educated at Ludlow Grammar School and at Trinity College, Cambridge, whence he graduated in 1834. While at Cambridge he contributed to the Gentleman's Magazine and other periodicals, and in 1835 he came to London to devote himself to a literary career.

His first separate work was Early English Poetry in Black Letter, with Prefaces and Notes (4 vols, 1836), which was followed over the next forty years by an extensive series of publications, many of lasting value. He helped to found the British Archaeological Association and the Percy, Camden and Shakespeare Societies. In 1842 he was elected corresponding member of the Académie des Inscriptions et Belles Lettres of Paris, and was a fellow of the Society of Antiquaries as well as member of many other learned British and foreign bodies.

In 1859, he superintended the excavations of the Roman town of Viroconium Cornoviorum (Wroxeter), near Shrewsbury, and issued a report. A portrait of him is in the Drawing Room Portrait Gallery for 1 October 1859.

English priest and historical writer, Thomas Edward Bridgett observed, "It is only when he has to speak of the Catholic Church that he is bitter and unfair."

He died aged 67 in Chelsea, London, and was buried in Brompton Cemetery.

== Selected works ==
- Queen Elizabeth and her Times, a Series of Original Letters (1838, 2 vols.)
- Reliquiae antiquae (1839–1843, again 1845, 2 vols.), edited with Mr JO Halliwell-Phillipps
- W. Mapes's Latin Poems (1841, 4to, Camden Society)
- Political Ballads and Carols, published by the Percy Society (1841)
- Popular Treatises on Science (1841)
- History of Ludlow (1841, etc.; again 1852)
- Collection of Latin Stories (1842, Percy Society)
- The Vision and Creed of Piers Ploughman (1842, 2 vols.; 2nd ed., 1855)
- Biographia literaria, vol. i. Anglo-Saxon Period (1842), vol. ii. Anglo-Norman Period (1846)
- The Chester Plays (1843–1847, 2 vols., Shakespeare Society)
- St Patrick's Purgatory (1844)
- Anecdota literaria (1844)
- Archaeological Album (1845,410)
- Essays connected with England in the Middle Ages (1846, 2 vols.)
- Chaucer's Canterbury Tales (1847–1851, Percy Society), a new text with notes, reprinted in 1 vol. (1853 and 1867)
- Early Travels in Palestine (1848, Bohn's Antiq. Lib.)
- England under the House of Hanover (1848, 2 vols., several editions, reproduced in 1868 as Caricature History of the Georges)
- Mapes, De nugis curialium (1850, 4to, Camden Society)
- Geoffrey Gaimar's Metrical Chronicle (1850, Caxton Society)
- Narratives of Sorcery and Magic (1851, 2 vols.)
- The Celt, the Roman and the Saxon (1852; 4th ed., 1885)
- Wanderings of an Antiquary; Chiefly upon the Traces of the Romans in Britain (1854)
- History of Fulke Fitz Warine (1855);
- de Garlandia, De triumphis ecclesiae (1856, 4to, Roxburghe Club)
- Dictionary of Obsolete and Provincial English (1857)
- A Volume of Vocabularies (1857; 2nd ed., by RP Wülcker, 1884, 2 vols.)
- Les Cent Nouvelles Nouvelles (Paris, 1858, 2 vols.)
- Malory's History of King Arthur (1858, 2 vols., revised 1865)
- Political Poems and Songs from Edward III to Richard III (1859–1861, 2 vols; "Rolls" series)
- Songs and Ballads of the Reign of Philip and Mary (1860, 4to, Roxburghe Club)
- Essays on Archaeological Subjects (1861, 2 vols.)
- The History of Domestic Manners and Sentiments in England in the Middle Ages (1862, 410, reproduced in 1871 as The Homes of other Days)
- The Roll of Arms of the Princes, Barons, and Knights who Attended King Edward I to the Siege of Caerlaverock, in 1300 (1864, 4to)
- Autobiography of Thomas Wright (1736–1797), his grandfather (1864)
- History of Caricature (1865, 4to)
- On the Worship of the Generative Powers during the Middle Ages of Western Europe (1865) (Attributed) Appended to the 1865 reprint of Sir Richard Payne Knight's An account of the remains of the worship of Priapus. Scanned facsimile available on Internet Archive
- Womankind in Western Europe (1869, 4to)
- Anglo-Latin Satirical Poets of the 12th Century (1872, 2 vols., Rolls Series).
- A History of Caricature and Grotesque in Literature and Art (1875, CHATTO AND WINDUS, Picadilly)
