= John Allen Giles =

English historian

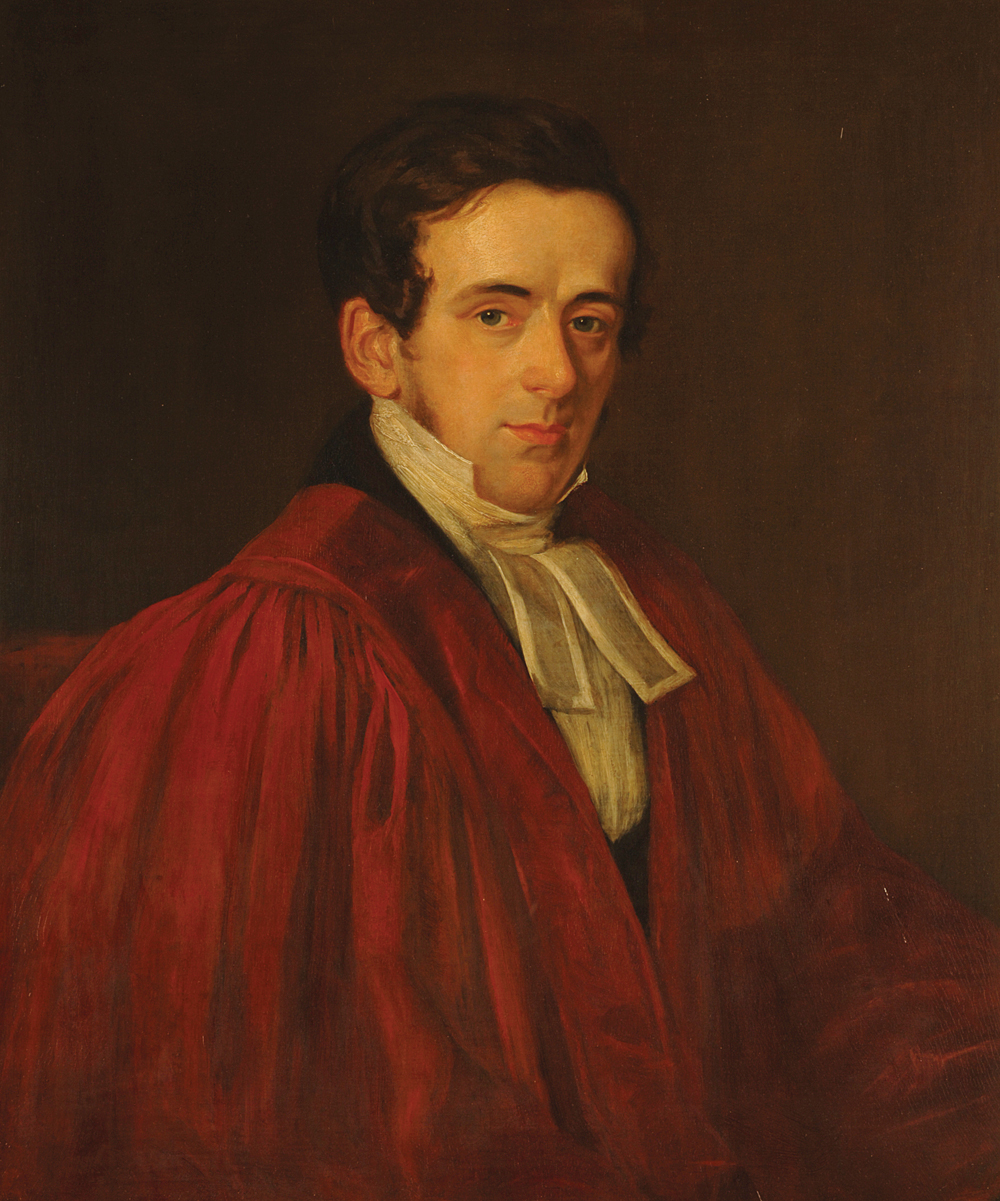
John Allen Giles by Charles J. Grant

John Allen Giles (1808–1884) was an English historian. He was primarily known as a scholar of Anglo-Saxon language and history. He revised Stevens' translation of the Anglo-Saxon Chronicle and Bede's Ecclesiastical History of the English People. He was a fellow at Corpus Christi College, Oxford.

== Biography ==
The son of William Giles and his wife Sophia, née Allen, he was born on 26 October 1808 at Southwick House, in the parish of Mark, Somerset. At the age of sixteen he entered Charterhouse School as a Somerset scholar. From Charterhouse he was elected to a Bath and Wells scholarship at Corpus Christi College, Oxford, on 26 November 1824. In Easter term 1828 he obtained a double first class honours degree, and shortly afterwards graduated B.A., proceeding M.A. in 1831, in which year he gained the Vinerian scholarship, and took his D.C.L. degree in 1838. His election to a fellowship at Corpus Christi College on 15 November 1832 followed his college scholarship as a matter of course.

Giles wished to become a barrister, but was persuaded by his mother to take orders, and was ordained to the curacy of Cossington, Somerset. The following year he vacated his fellowship, and was married. In 1834 he was appointed to the head-mastership of Camberwell Collegiate School, and on 24 November 1836 was elected head-master of the City of London School. The school did not do well under him, and he resigned on 23 January 1840; his resignation, however, has also been attributed to some misfortune connected with building speculations. He was succeeded by George Ferris Whidborne Mortimer. He retired to a house which he had built near Bagshot, and there took pupils, and wrote.

After a few years Giles became curate of Bampton, Oxfordshire, where he continued taking pupils, and edited and wrote a great number of books. Among them was one entitled Christian Records, published in 1854, which related to the age and authenticity of the books of the New Testament. Samuel Wilberforce as bishop of Oxford, required him, on pain of losing his curacy, to suppress this work, and break off with another literary undertaking. After some letters, which were published, he complied with the bishop's demand.

In September 1846 Giles secured an introduction to André-Marie Ampère from Sainte-Beuve, and subsequently contributed amongst other works six volumes of Bede to Jacques Paul Migne's Patrologia Latina.

On 6 March 1855 Giles was tried at the Oxford spring assizes before Lord Campbell, on the charges of having entered in the marriage register book of Bampton parish church a marriage under date 3 October 1854, which took place on the 5th, having himself performed the ceremony out of canonical hours, soon after 6 a.m.; of having falsely entered that it was performed by license; and of having forged the mark of a witness who was not present. He pleaded not guilty, but it was clear that he had committed the offence to cover the pregnancy of one of his servants, whom he married to her lover, Richard Pratt, a shoemaker's apprentice. Pratt's master, one of Giles's parishioners, instituted the proceedings.

Giles spoke on his own behalf, and declared that he had published 120 volumes. His bishop also spoke for him. He was found guilty, but strongly recommended to mercy. Lord Campbell sentenced him to a year's imprisonment in Oxford Castle. After three months' imprisonment he was released by royal warrant on 4 June 1855.

After two or three years Giles took the curacy, with sole charge, of Perivale in Middlesex, and after five years became curate of Harmondsworth, near Slough. At the end of a year he resigned this curacy, and went to live at Cranford, nearby, where he took pupils, and after a while moved to Ealing. He did not resume clerical work until he was presented in 1867 to the living of Sutton, Surrey, which he held for seventeen years, until his death on 24 September 1884.

== Works ==
Much of Giles's work was hasty, and done for booksellers. His Scriptores Græci minores was published in 1831, and his Latin Grammar reached a third edition in 1833. He published a Greek Lexicon in 1839.

Between 1837 and 1843 Giles published the Patres Ecclesiæ Anglicanæ, a series of thirty-four volumes, containing the works of Aldhelm, Bæda, Boniface, Lanfranc, Archbishop Thomas, John of Salisbury, Peter of Blois, Gilbert Foliot, and other authors. Giles published his translation of Geoffrey of Monmouth's Historia Regum Britanniae in 1842 and it includes the Prophecies of Merlin. Several volumes of the Caxton Society's publications were edited by him, chiefly between 1845 and 1854. Among these were Anecdota Bædæ et aliorum, Benedictus Abbas, de Vita S. Thomæ, Chronicon Angliae Petriburgense, La révolte du Conte de Warwick, and Vitæ quorundam Anglo-Saxonum. His Scriptores rerum gestarum Willelmi Conquestoris was published in 1845.

Giles contributed to Bohn's Antiquarian Library translations of Matthew Paris (1847), Bede's Ecclesiastical History, and the Anglo-Saxon Chronicle, (1849), and other works. In 1845 he published Life and Times of Thomas Becket, 2 vols., translated into French, 1858; in 1847, History of the Ancient Britons, 2 vols., and in 1848, Life and Times of Alfred the Great. In 1848, he produced Six Old English Chronicles which mostly reprinted previously published material.

In 1847–1848 appeared his History of Bampton, 2 vols., and in 1852 his History of Witney and some neighbouring Parishes. While at Bampton, in 1850 he published Hebrew Records on the age and authenticity of the books of the Old Testament, and in 1854 Christian Records on the Age, Authorship, and Authenticity of the Books of the New Testament, in which he contended, in a preface dated 26 October 1853, that the "Gospels and Acts were not in existence before the year 150", and remarks that "the objections of ancient philosophers, Celsus, Porphyry, and others, were drowned in the tide of orthodox resentment" (see Letters of the Bishop of Oxford and Dr. J. A. G., published in a separate volume). A review of Giles' 1854 Christian Records, states, "His [Giles] object is to establish ...that the historical books of the New Testament are without any evidence, external or internal, of origin from an apostolical period or source ; and abound in irreconcilable discrepancies."

The testimony of Justin Martyr who wrote his "Apology for the Christians" in A.D. 151 ...does not name a single writer of the eight, who are said to have written the books of the New Testament. The very names of the evangelists Matthew, Mark, Luke, and John, are never mentioned by him —do not occur once in all his works. It is therefore not true that he has quoted from our existing Gospels, and so proves their existence, as they now are, in his own time.

In 1853 he began to work on a series called Dr. Giles's Juvenile Library, which went on appearing from time to time until 1860, and comprised a large number of school-books, First Lessons on English, Scottish, Irish, French, and Indian history, on geography, astronomy, arithmetic, &c. He contributed Poetic Treasures to Moxon's Popular Poets in 1881. Ca. 1860, he also created versions of Greek and Latin classics presented in an interlinear style, apparently based on a pedagogical approach advocated by James Hamilton (1769–1829).

== Marriage and children ==
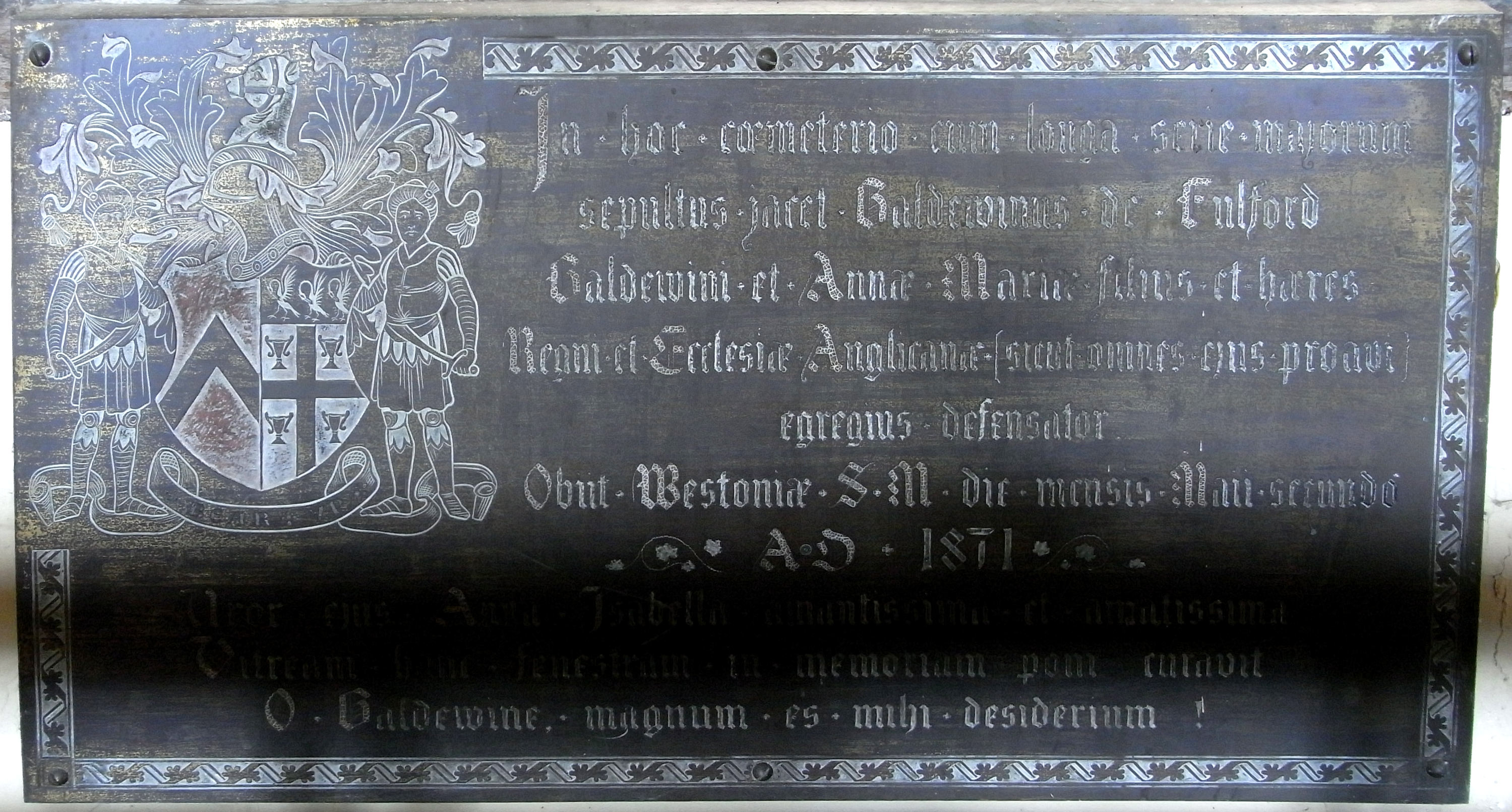
Monumental brass in Dunsford Church, Devon, erected by Anna Isabella Giles to her husband Col. Baldwin Fulford (1801–1871), displaying the arms of Giles: Azure, a cross between four cups uncovered or on a chief argent three pelicans vulning themselves proper

Giles married in 1833 Anna Sarah Dickinson (died 1896), which required him to give up his college fellowship. Their children included:

- Arthur Henry Giles, in the Bengal police
- Herbert Allen Giles, Professor of Chinese at the University of Cambridge.
- Anna Isabella Giles, eldest daughter, married firstly in 1868 to Col. Baldwin Fulford (1801–1871) of Great Fulford, Dunsford, Devon, a Justice of the Peace for Devon, Chairman of Quarter Sessions and Colonel of the 1st Royal Devon Yeomanry, secondly in 1878 to William James Dundas Cloeté of Churchill Court, Somerset and thirdly in 1895 to John Pugh Vaughan Pryse of South Wales,
- Ellen Harriet Giles, unmarried.
