= Hereward House School =

Independent school in London

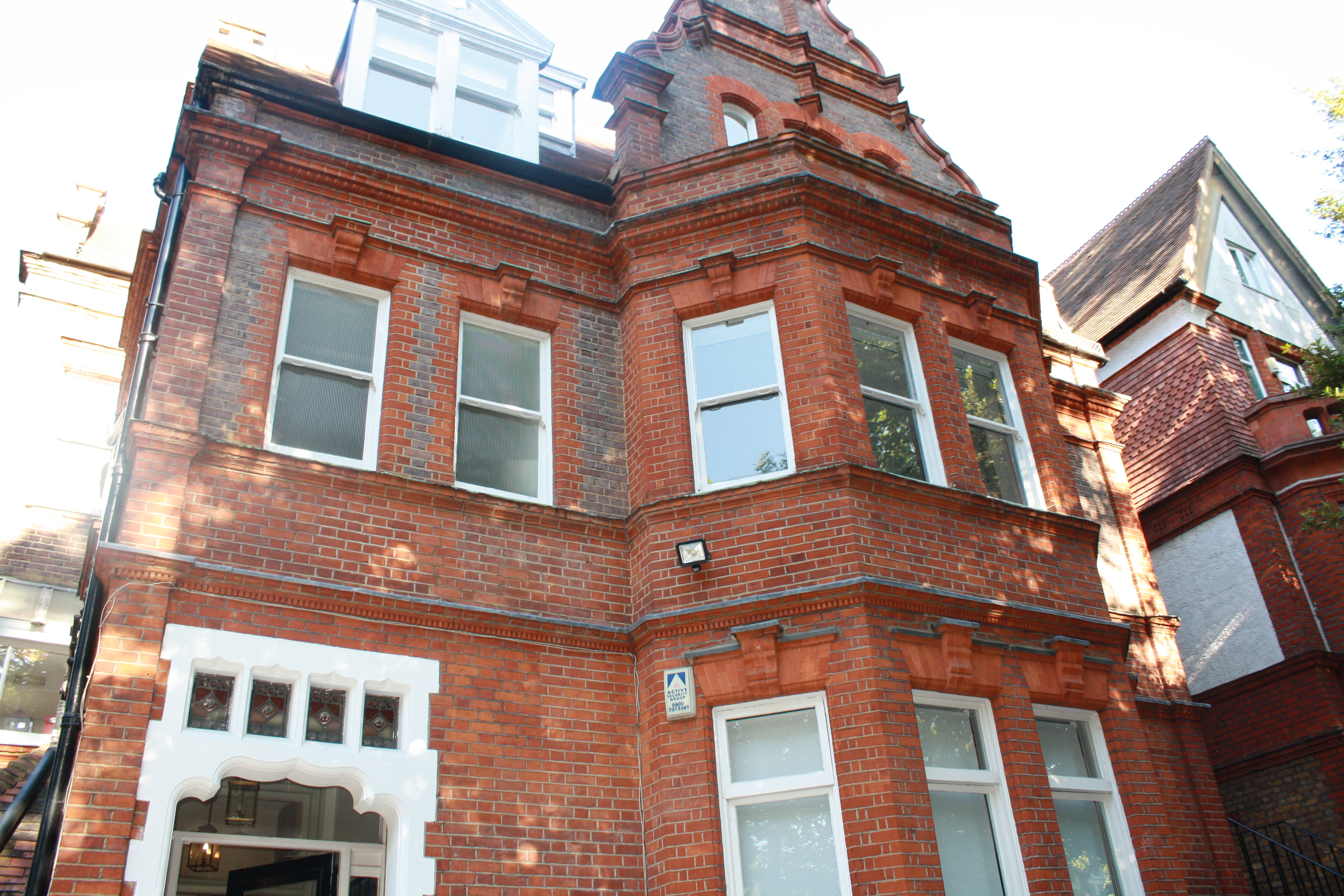
- The front of Hereward House School

Location
- 14 Strathray Gardens; London, NW3 4NY; United Kingdom; 51.545075°N 0.170019°W

Information
- School type: Boys' private day school
- Established: 1 September 1951; 74 years ago
- Founders: Richard and Mary Brewster
- Status: Open
- Local authority: London Borough of Camden
- Educational authority: Independent Schools Inspectorate
- Department for Education URN: 100069 Tables
- Chair: Leonie Sampson
- Headmaster: Pascal Evans
- Staff: 35
- Key people: Paul Cheetham; Deputy, Kirsten Hampshire; Head of Middle School, Yasmin Elharrak; Head of Junior School, Nicole Scaffidi; Head of EYFS,
- Gender: Boys
- Age: 4 to 13
- Enrollment: 171
- Average class size: 19 Pupils
- Student to teacher ratio: 1:4
- Classrooms: 12
- Houses: Angles, Danes, Normans, Saxons
- Colours: Blue and White
- Sports: Football, cricket, dodgeball, basketball and hockey
- Nickname: HHS
- Website: https://www.herewardhouse.co.uk

Hereward House School (/hɛrɪˈwəd hɑːʊs/), also known as HHS, is an Independent Association of Prep Schools (IAPS) private preparatory school for boys aged 4 to 13, located in Hampstead, London on 14 Strathray Gardens, near Swiss Cottage and Finchley Road. It prepares boys for London day schools as well as London boarding schools (including City of London, Westminster, Mill Hill and Highgate).

== History ==
The school was founded in 1951 by Lionel and Mary (Bella) Brewester. It originally had six pupils, and was based Belsize Avenue. This number slowly increased until they moved to their current site (14 Strathray Gardens) in the 1960s. Today, the school teaches 171 pupils every day and employs 35 staff, 27 of whom are teaching staff. Pupils usually join the school from Transition to Year 1, but sometimes join in higher years. The school is split up into three main sections, the Junior School consists of Transition, Year 1 and Year 2, the Middle School consists of Years 3, 4 and the Senior School, which consists of Year 6, CE2 (Year 7) and CE1 (Year 8).

== Operation ==
The school was named after the eleventh-century rebel leader, Hereward the Wake. All four school houses, one of which each boy is allocated to, are named after ethnic groups from his time period: the Angles, Danes, Normans and Saxons As is customary in most preparatory schools, competition exists between the houses, in sports and academic life.

All boys of all ages have to wear the school uniform, which is composed of mostly grey and black clothing, accompanied by the distinctive white and blue striped tie, and the fleur-de-lis embroidered blazer. This uniform differentiates the pupils from those of the other preparatory schools in the area.

=== Sports ===
Hereward House specializes especially in football, which is played in the winter months, and cricket, which is played in the summer. In football, Hereward House competes against other schools, including Highgate, UCS and City of London. Both cricket and football are played at Hampstead Heath Extension and Brondesbury Cricket Grounds, with football being played at Swiss Cottage Astro-Turf every week.

There are also inter-house competitions in the two sports, with the four houses competing against each other for inter-house glory. Cross country races are held at the Hampstead Heath Extension. The Hereward House Inter-School Cross-Country is an event in March at Hampstead Heath Extension. Schools are invited from across London to compete for titles in under-eleven and under-thirteen races.
