= Leofric (fl. 1070) =

11th-century English priest and writer

- Occupation(s): English cleric and writer
- Notable work: Wrote an Old English history of Hereward the Wake; Priest at Bourne while Hereward was active with his rebellion

Leofric (fl. 1070) was an English cleric and writer who wrote an Old English history of Hereward the Wake.

The author of the Gesta Herewardi claims that Leofric was Hereward's priest and wrote an account of Hereward's life in Old English. The Gesta's author then used the Old English work as a source for his Latin Gesta. According to the Gesta, Leofric was a priest at Bourne in Lincolnshire while Hereward was active with his rebellion. No version of Leofric's work survives.

The number of details in the first part of the Gesta, which is where the Gesta's author claimed to use Leofric's work, is an argument for the existence of such a work, whether or not it was actually authored by Leofric.
