= Geoffrey Gaimar =

Anglo-Norman chronicler and translator

Geoffrey Gaimar (fl. 1130s), also written Geffrei or Geoffroy, was an Anglo-Norman chronicler. His contribution to medieval literature and history was as a translator from Old English to Anglo-Norman. His L'Estoire des Engleis, or History of the English People, written about 1136–1140, was a chronicle in eight-syllable rhyming couplets, running to 6,526 lines.

== Overview of his work ==
The L'Estoire des Engleis opens with a brief mention of King Arthur, whose actions affect the plot of the interpolated tale of Havelok the Dane. That aside, most of the first 3,500 lines are translations out of a variant text of the Anglo-Saxon Chronicle and subsequent portions from other (Latin and French) sources that remain unidentified.

Gaimar claims to have also written a version of the Brut story, a translation of Geoffrey of Monmouth's chronicle Historia Regum Britanniae (c. 1136) into Anglo-Norman verse, which was commissioned by Constance, wife of Ralph FitzGilbert, a Lincolnshire landowner. Constance appears to have been implicated in the writing process. Gaimar's translation, if it existed, antedated Wace's Norman Roman de Brut (c. 1155), but no copy of Gaimar's Brut (also known as L'Estoire des Bretuns) has survived, being superseded by the latecomer. (Note: Ritson notes: "poet anterior to Wace, etc.") Ian Short argues that Gaimar's Estoire des Bretuns was no more than a short epitome of the pre-Arthurian section of Geoffrey of Monmouth's Historia Regum Britanniae, which might explain why Wace's later, full translation of the text became more popular and ultimately superseded Gaimer's.

Gaimar did not create two separate and distinct chronicles, and the two estoires were merely the former and latter sections of a long-running history starting from the Argonauts' quest for the Golden Fleece to the reign of William II "Rufus" (died 1100) that Gaimar set out to write. Gaimar's scheme was greatly expanded in scope from the translation work on Geoffrey of Monmouth, the former part, which the patron had requested. Ironically, it was solely the latter part covering the Anglo-Saxon period that was transmitted by later copyists, as a continuation to Wace. The scribe of one such copy, in a late 13th-century manuscript (B.L. Royal 13 A xx i), dubbed the portion with the title Estoire des Engles. The so-called "lost L'Estoire des Bretuns" (History of the Britons) was an expedient term coined by 19th-century commentators.

A version of Havelok the Dane occurs at the beginning of L'Estoire des Engles, which must have originally been interpolated in between the history of the Britons and the history of the English, serving as a bridge. Unlike the Middle English version of the legend, Gaimar's version connects Havelok to King Arthur (making him responsible for destroying the Danish kingdom that Havelok would inherit.) (Note: There is also an Anglo-Norman lai version, but that is thought to be later and derived from Gaimar.Fahnestock (1915). A study of the sources and composition of the old French Lai d'Haveloc. Jamaica, New York: The Marion Press. p. 121.) Additionally there is a mention of a sword, Calibur (Excalibur), pointing to Gaimar's knowledge of Galfridian legendary history that predated the advent of Wace's Brut.

== See also ==
- British literature
- Anglo-Norman literature

== Bibliography ==
Texts and translations

- Bell, Alexander, ed. (1960). L'Estoire des Engleis by Geffrei Gaimar. Anglo-Norman Texts. Vol. 14–16. Oxford: B. Blackwell.
- Bell, Alexander, ed. (1925). Le lai d'Haveloc and Gaimar's Haveloc episode. Manchester: University Press.
- "Le lai d'Haveloc and Gaimar's Haveloc episode". Rerum Britannicarum medii ævi scriptores or Chronicles and Memorials of Great Britain and Ireland during the Middle Ages. Vol. II. Translated by Hardy, Thomas Duffus; Martin, Charles Trice. London: H.M. Stationery Office. 1889.. Archived from the original Vol. I Text Vol. II Translation on 7 August 2007.
- Short, Ian, ed. (2009). Geffrei Gaimar Estoire Des Engleis History of the English. Oxford University Press.
- Wright, Thomas, ed. (1850). The Anglo-Norman metrical chronicle of Geoffrey Gaimar. London: Printed for the members of the Caxton Society.

Studies

- Bratu, Cristian, "Translatio, autorité et affirmation de soi chez Gaimar, Wace et Benoît de Sainte-Maure." The Medieval Chronicle 8 (2013), pp. 135–164.
- Harper-Bill, Christopher & van Houts, Elisabeth (eds.), A Companion to the Anglo-Norman World, Boydell, 2007. ISBN 978-1-84383-341-3.
- Legge, Mary D., Anglo-Norman Literature and its Background, Oxford University Press, 1963.
- Short, Ian R., "What was Gaimar's Estoire des Bretuns?", in: Cultura Neolatina 71, 2011, pp. 143–145.
