= Belsar's Hill =

Hillfort in Cambridgeshire, England

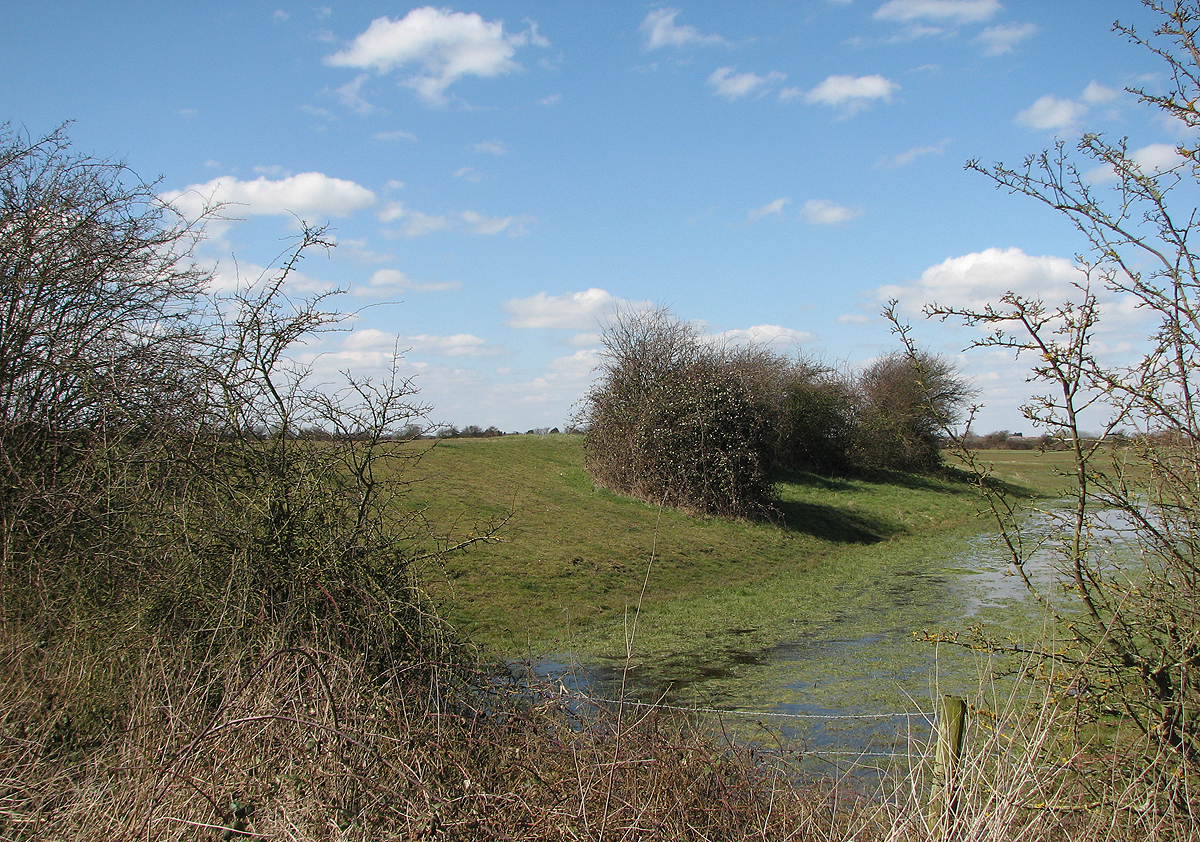
- Belsar's Hill: earthwork and ditch

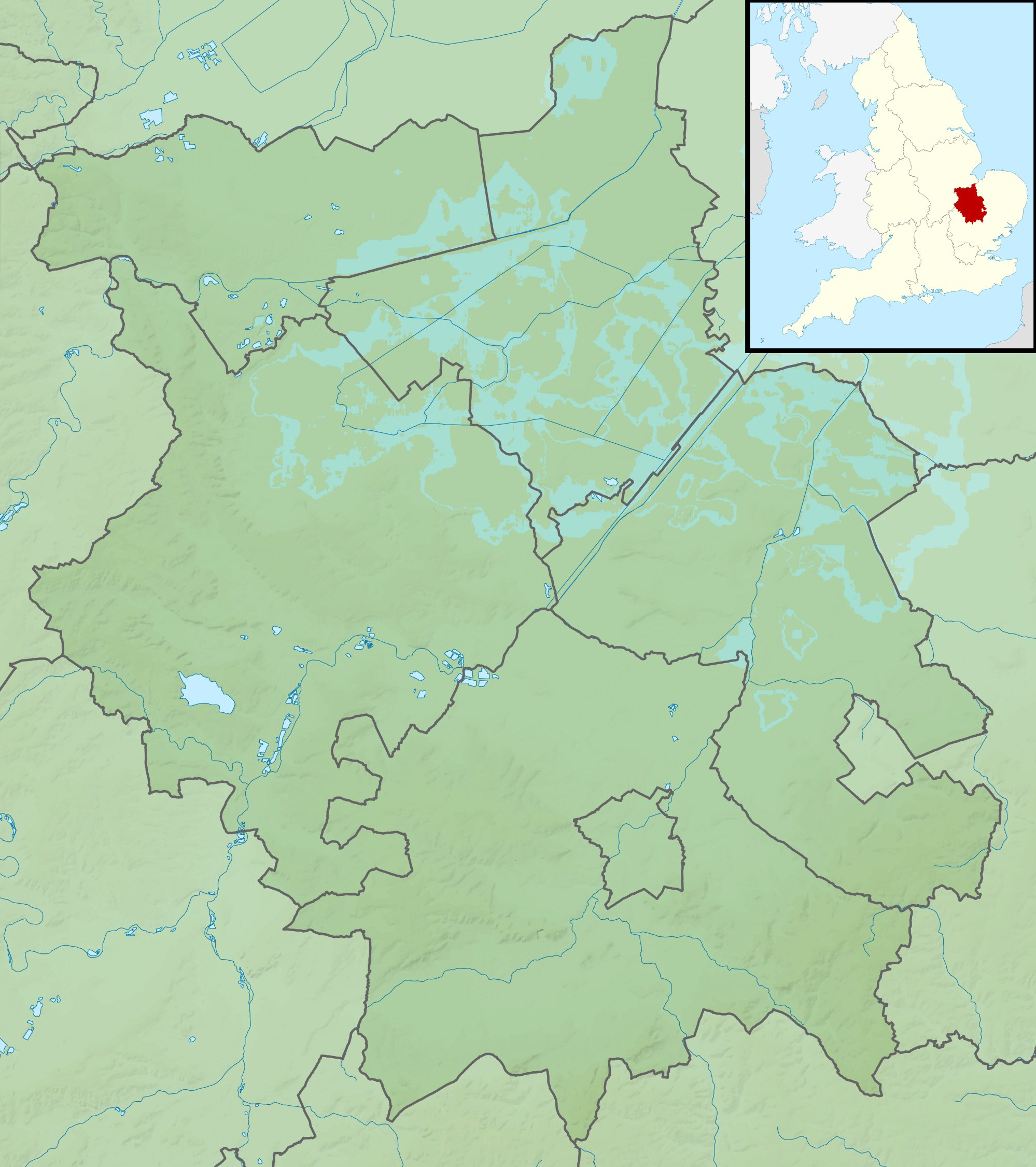
- Map of Cambridgeshire showing the location of Belsar's Hill
- 52°18′43.6″N 0°5′10.0″E
- Type: Hillfort
- Location: Cambridgeshire, England

History
- Built: Iron Age

Site notes
- Area: 6 acres (24,000 m^{2})

Belsar's Hill is a hillfort near Willingham, Cambridgeshire, England.

== Description ==
Belsar's Hill is an oval-shaped area, 265–220 metres (869–722 ft), enclosing 6 acres (24,000 m^{2}). At the time of its construction, it would have constituted an island of firm soil surrounded by waterlogged fens. The defences are believed to have consisted of a single 10–15 metres (33–49 ft) wide, 1.5 metres (4.9 ft) ditch, and a rampart on a 2–4 metres (6.6–13.1 ft) high bank. The hill was situated along the Aldreth Causeway, and is transected by a 19th-century track, believed to be a redirection of the original Causeway.

== History ==
The location of the fortification, on the boundary between the tribal lands of the Iceni and Catuvellauni, and a similarity to other Iron Age hillforts such as Arbury Banks or Wandlebury, suggests an Iron Age provenance.

It is believed that the structure was reoccupied during the Norman Conquest. During this time period the Norman forces were combating a local revolt under Hereward the Wake, and the hillfort would have been strategically located on the Aldreth Causeway, the main road to Ely. A postulated name of "Belassise", from the Old French "bel assis" (meaning well seated/placed), also suggests a Norman link. An alternative suggested etymology, stemming from the Norman general named "Belasius", also suggests Norman involvement. The importance of this location in the defence of Ely has led some to suggest that the ringfort may have been the Castle of Aldreth.

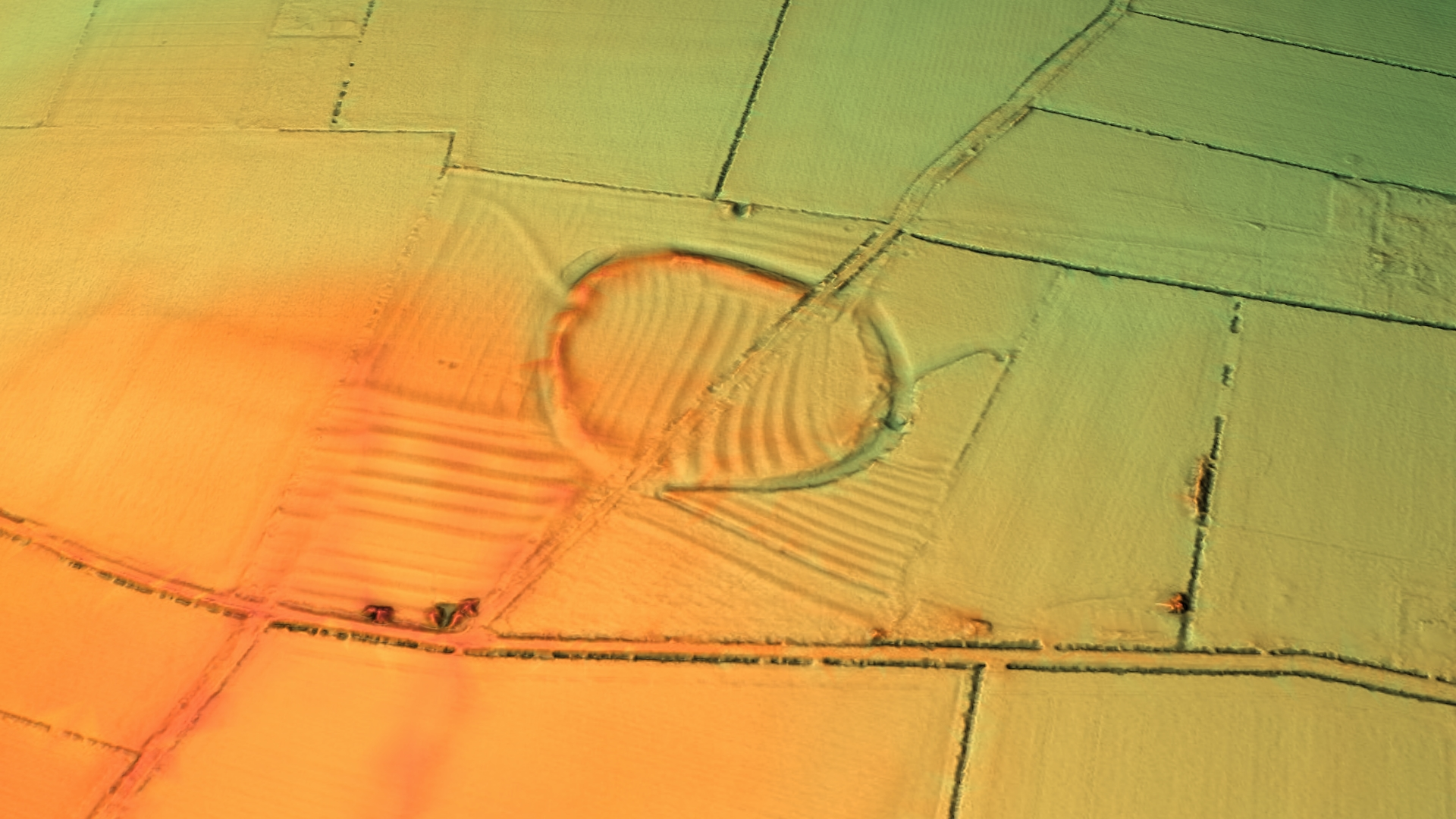
3D view of the digital terrain model

According to the recorded history of the revolt led by Hereward the Wake at the turn of the 11th century, Hereward's troops retreated to the Isle of Ely, surrounded by fenland which was impassable to the Norman cavalry. An attempt was made to build a mile-long causeway, but the weight of the Norman armour caused the causeway to sink. Eventually, the Norman troops bribed a local monk to show them a safe passage across the fen.

== See also ==
- Hereward the Wake
- List of hillforts in England
