= Timothy Neve (antiquary) =

English antiquarian

- Born: 1694; Stanton Lacy
- Died: 3 February 1757 (aged 62–63); Lincoln
- Occupation: Antiquarian

Timothy Neve (1694 – 3 February 1757) was an English divine and antiquarian.

== Biography ==
Neve was born at Wotton, in the parish of Stanton-Lacy, near Ludlow, Shropshire, in 1694. He was the son of Paul Neve, bailiff of the same place, and was educated at Ludlow school. He was admitted sizar of St. John's College, Cambridge, 10 November 1711, under Goodwyn, and graduated B.A. in 1714. In 1716, he became master of the free grammar school at Spalding, Lincolnshire. He performed service in some capacity in Spalding parish church, and was in 1718 admitted a member of the Gentleman's Society of Spalding, of which he acted as librarian. To this society he communicated several papers, including, in 1727, essays on the invention of printing and our first printers, and on Bishop Kennett's donation of books to Peterborough Cathedral. Leaving Spalding about 1729, when a successor at the school was appointed, he moved to Peterborough, where he was minor canon from 24 March 1728–9 till 1745. While there he was secretary and joint founder, along with Joseph Sparke, the registrar of Peterborough, of the Gentleman's Society, founded on the lines of the Spalding society.

He was chaplain to Dr. Thomas, bishop of Lincoln, and by him nominated prebendary of Lincoln, first of the North Kelsey stall (1744–8), then of Nassington stall (1747–57). On 28 March 1747, he was also collated archdeacon of Huntingdon. For twenty-eight years (1729–57) he was rector of Alwalton, Huntingdonshire, a living attached to his Lincoln prebend. He died there on 3 February 1757, and was buried in Alwalton Church, in the north transept of which is an epitaph to his memory.

By his first wife (married 1722, died 1728) he had four children, of whom two were surviving in 1741—a son, Timothy [q. v.], and a daughter, subsequently married to a Mr. Davies (Nichols, Lit. Anecd. vi. 136). His second wife, whom he married on 26 February 1750, was Christina, daughter of the Rev. Mr. Greene of Drinkstone, Bury St. Edmunds, and sister to Lady Danvers of Rushbrooke, Suffolk.

Watt attributes to him ‘Observations of 2 Parhelia, or Mock Suns, seen 30 December 1735, and of an Aurora Borealis seen 11 December 1735, (Phil. Trans. Abridg. vii. 134, 1751); also on an ‘Aurora Borealis seen in 1741’ (ib. p. 526).
