= Willingham, Cambridgeshire =

Village in Cambridgeshire, England

Coordinates: 52.32°N 0.07°E

Willingham
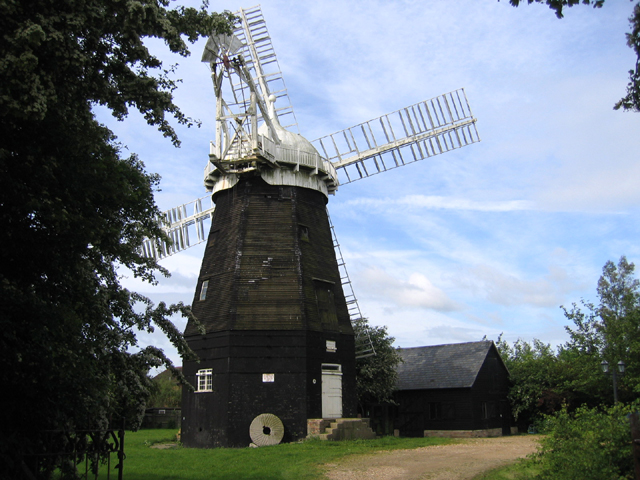
- Cattell's Mill

- Location within Cambridgeshire
- Population: 4,015 (2011)
- OS grid reference: TL408707
- District: South Cambridgeshire
- Shire county: Cambridgeshire
- Region: East
- Country: England
- Sovereign state: United Kingdom
- Post town: Cambridge
- Postcode district: CB24
- Dialling code: 01954

Willingham is a village in Cambridgeshire, England. It is located in the South Cambridgeshire district and sits just outside the border of the Fens, just south of the River Great Ouse.

Located approximately 12 miles (19 km) northwest of Cambridge, on the B1050 road, Willingham Parish occupies 4,641 acres (1,878 ha), and had a population in 2007 of 3,900 people, increasing to 4,015 at the Census 2011. The highest point in the village is only approximately 23 feet (7 m) above sea level and Willingham has become increasingly at risk from flooding.

== History ==
The name Willingham probably originated from being the homestead of the family or followers of a man called "Wifel" and was called Vuivlingeham c. 1050 and Wivelingham around 1086. The name Wivelingham was also used to refer to the village until the 18th century.

The area at the edge of the fens to the north of the present village was already occupied by the 2nd century, though these were at some point abandoned. The Aldreth causeway, which formed the main route between Cambridge and Ely in medieval times and perhaps dating from the Bronze Age, runs through the east of the parish past Belsar's Hill, and until the opening of the Cambridge-Ely turnpike in 1768, carriage traffic would have run through Willingham.

One of the oldest houses in the village dates from the 15th century. Willingham's history is closely associated to its position on the edge of the Fens and it was only with the major efforts to drain the Fens during the 17th century that the parish took its modern structure. During the Middle Ages, the majority of the low-lying land in the parish was inundated annually, and the village had two permanent meres, with the larger of the two growing to 380 acres (150 ha) at times of highest water level. It was only with the construction of the sluice at Earith in 1650 which diverted the flow of the Ouse from the Old West into the New Bedford River that the parish was able to remain largely unflooded. Additional areas were drained by windmills until replaced by steam pumps in the mid-19th century.

Willingham's registered population grew from 23 at the time of the Domesday Book in 1086 to 79 in 1251, and in 1377 the poll tax was paid by 287 adults. By 1801 the population was almost 800 inhabitants growing to more than 1,600 in 1851 despite a wave of emigration to America in the 1830s. Numbers then remained generally constant until the 1960s when it grew rapidly again, and passing 2,500 by 1981 and 3,436 in 2001.

A local man named Jabez Few, who died in the 1920s, was regarded by the townspeople of Willingham as a witch. They claimed that the white mice he kept were his familiar spirits, and that they could not be got rid of after his death until they were held over running water. In 1940, a German spy parachuted into Willingham, and was eventually captured and turned into a double agent.

Politically, the electorate of Willingham had voted consistently for Conservative Party candidates in local elections for both the County Council and the District Council between 1997 and 2016. However, since South Cambridgeshire delivered a 60.2% vote in favour of remaining in the European Union in the 2016 Brexit referendum, the Liberal Democrats have been victorious in every local ward election since 2017.

== Church ==
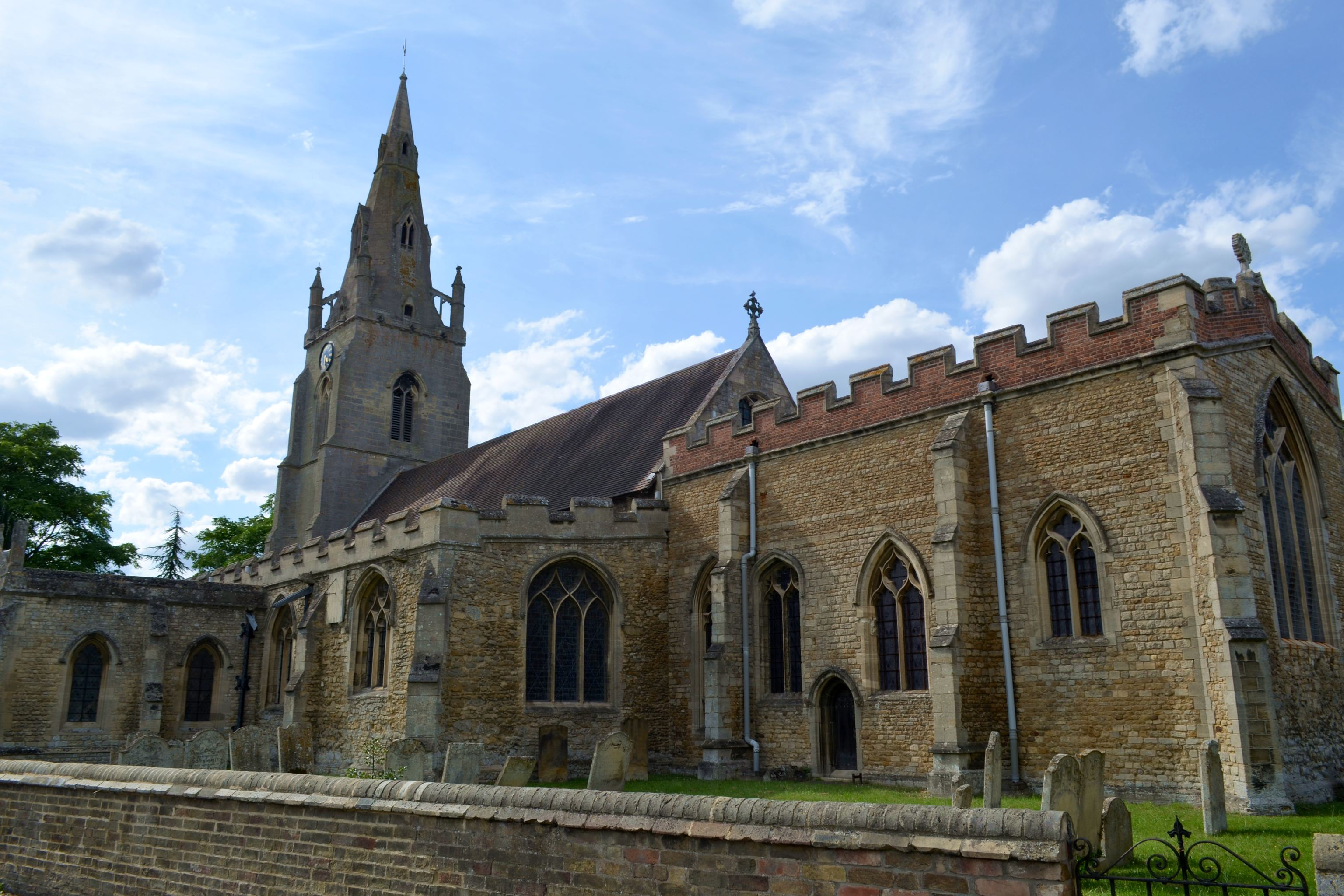
Willingham All Saints' Church in July 2014

Evidence of Christian Anglo-Saxon activity in Willingham has been found, and there has probably been a church in the village since at least the 12th century. The present church of St Mary and All Saints was built on the foundations of the 12th-century building. Mainly constructed in the 14th century, it consists of a chancel with north vestry, nave, a south porch and a west tower with an unusual spire. It has notable 14th- and 15th-century figure paintings, including a rare picture of a pregnant Virgin Mary. The nave has a fine angel roof of double hammer-beam construction. It is a Grade I listed building.

== Village life ==
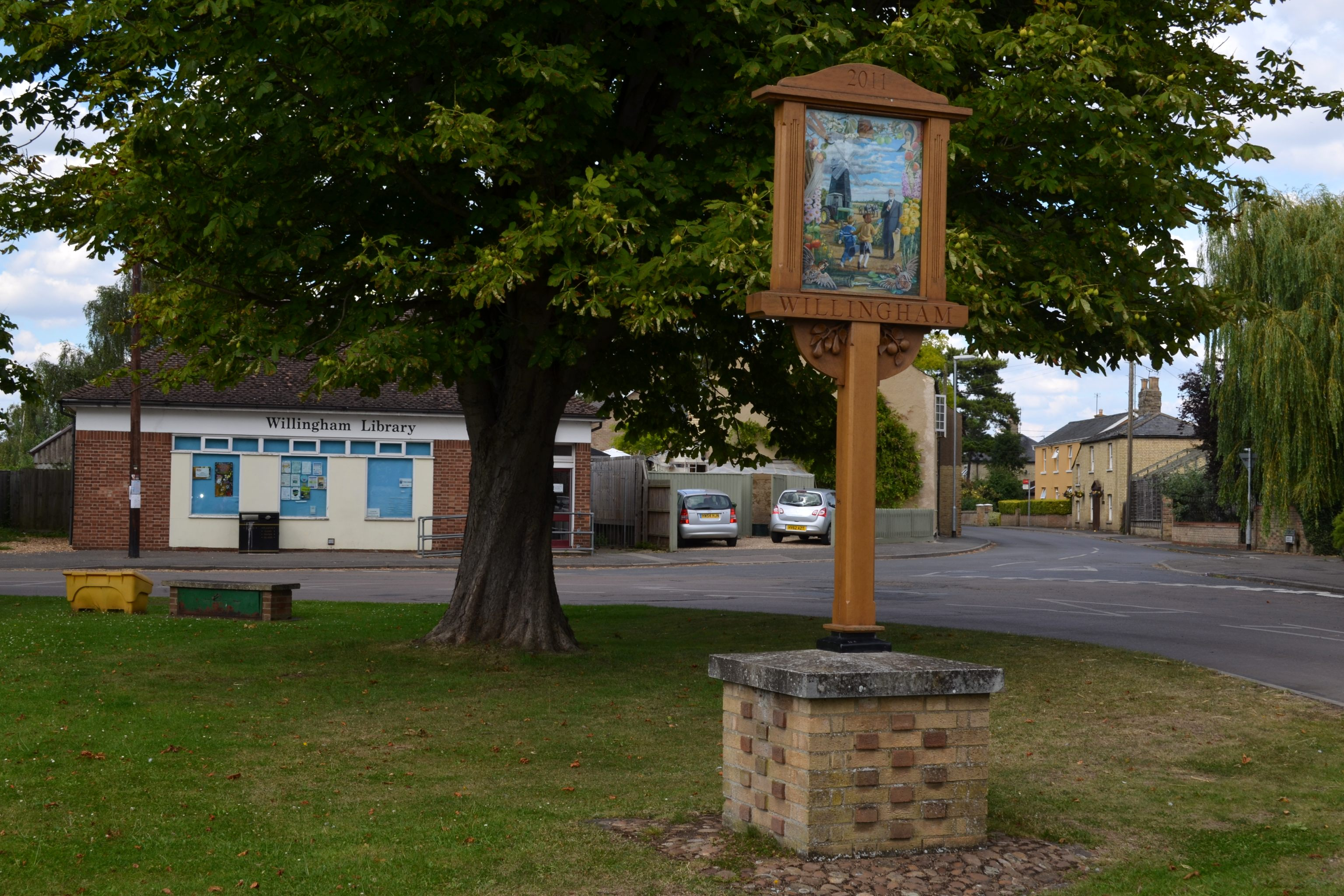
Willingham village sign, green and library in July 2014

Willingham has a primary school, library, surgery, post office and a number of shops and restaurants. There are currently three pubs in the village — the Duke of Wellington (closed since late 2022 whilst seeking new tenants), The Bank and The Porterhouse Pub. The first recorded alehouses were the George in 1665 and the Five Bells in 1671 though by the late 19th century the number had risen to 16 with the George and the Vine the most notable. The White Hart opened in 1910; there were still 7 pubs in 1933 and 5 in 1982, of which the oldest was the Duke of Wellington, known as the Warriors in the 18th century.

The village has a number of amenities for young people provided by the Willingham Youth Trust and a well established Scout Group.

Willingham also has a football club named Willingham Wolves. It's not known for sure why they took the name of Wolves, though it was presumably for alliteration. Today the club offers grass-roots football to almost 300+ players from as young as 5 all the way to men's and ladies senior teams.

Willingham has a Parish Council made up of 15 Councillors all of whom are volunteers. The period of office is normally 4 years, but if they have been co-opted or elected at a by-election, they will serve until the next normal election time which at the moment is May 2026.

Transport links nearby include the A14 trunk road and the Cambridgeshire Guided Busway, with the River Great Ouse, also known as the Old West River, less than 2 miles (3 km) away. A bus service links Willingham and surrounding villages with Cambridge and St Ives.

Villages adjacent to Willingham include Earith, Over, Rampton, Longstanton and Bar Hill. The village of Willingham is a direct neighbour of the new town of Northstowe, which is currently in Phase 2 of construction.
