= Estoire des Engleis =

12th-century English chronicle

Estoire des Engleis (English: History of the English) is a chronicle of English history composed by Geffrei Gaimar. Written for the wife of a landholder in Lincolnshire and Hampshire, it is the oldest known history chronicle in the French language. Scholars have proposed various dates for the chronicle's writing; the middle-to-late 1130s is commonly accepted. Largely based upon, or directly translated from, pre-existing chronicles, the Estoire des Engleis documents English history from the 495 landing of Cerdic of Wessex to the death of King William Rufus in 1100. The original chronicle opened with England's mythical Trojan beginnings, but all portions which document the period before Cerdic have been lost.

== History ==
Geffrei Gaimar wrote the Estoire des Engleis for Constance, the wife of Ralf FitzGilbert. FitzGilbert, who, according to Gaimar in the chronicle's epilogue, commissioned its writing, possessed land in Lincolnshire and Hampshire. Gaimar himself may have been FitzGilbert's chaplain, or perhaps a secular clerk. Scholars have varying opinions concerning the date of the chronicle's writing, with commonly accepted ranges including March 1136 – April 1137 and 1135–1140. Gaimar possibly started the chronicle's composition in Hampshire and completed it in Lincolnshire.

Ian Short, an emeritus professor of French at Birkbeck, University of London, stated that the chronicle was written "to provide a vast panorama of the Celto-British, Anglo-Saxon, and Anglo-Norman dynasties in the British Isles from Trojan times until the death of William Rufus." It is the oldest known history chronicle written in the French language. The chronicle was written with a Norman bias, stating that the Normans were the true successors to the English throne. As mentioned in the chronicle's epilogue, it opened with England's mythical Trojan beginnings when it was first written. However, this first portion of the chronicle, known as the Estoire des Troiiens, along with another early part named the Estoire des Bretuns, has been lost. The present-day copy begins with the 495 landing of Cerdic of Wessex in England, and ends with William II's death in 1100. The chronicle was written in couplets, containing 6,532 octosyllables. Four manuscripts of the Estoire des Engleis currently exist. The title Estoire des Engleis derives from the British Library version.

The Estoire des Engleis is based upon pre-existing chronicles. For instance, the now-lost portions of the chronicle, the Estoire des Troiiens and Estoire des Bretuns, likely used information from the Historia Regum Britanniae, which was written by Geoffrey of Monmouth. After this, starting with Cerdic, the chronicle is primarily a translation of the Anglo-Saxon Chronicle to about 959. Its accuracy is questioned by scholars, but the chronicle is nonetheless recognized as valuable in other areas of study.
