= Caxton Society =

The Caxton Society was founded in the United Kingdom in 1845 to promote the publication of inexpensive and convenient editions of medieval literature, including chronicles, that had not yet appeared in print. It was named after William Caxton, the 15th-century English merchant who may have been the first to use the printing press in England, and listed thirty-three founding members, among whom were Samuel Wilberforce, Bishop of Oxford, Merton College Library, Oxford, the Deputy Keeper of the Public Record Office, the then president of Trinity College, Oxford, the library of the Writers to the Signet and the antiquarian Thomas Wright. (Note: Philippa Levine cites Bishop Samuel Wilberforce of Oxford, a leading critic of Charles Darwin's work towards a theory of evolution, to exemplify a belief that supporting endeavours such as the Caxton Society advanced a "Providential plan": in a speech given in 1857, "he declared that 'there was far more than the mere gratification of a somewhat idle curiosity when archaeologists ransacked the dust of antiquity. They were carrying out the great plan of the Creator and Ruler of the world.' History was invested with divine intention."'"`UNIQ--ref-00000003-QINU`"') Members did not pay a subscription, but were required to buy at least one publication: these were funded by income from sales. The Society ceased operating in 1854, by which time it had published at least 15 volumes. (Note: While Levine does not reference the failure of the Caxton Society directly, she observes that, in the 19th century, "[t]here were numerous ... cases of [similar] societies which, after a few volumes, simply ceased publishing. It was not a lack of demand that led to these failures nor a saturation of the market, [but rather the] aims [of these societies] were too much akin to those of the Camden Society whose early successes had established its supremacy in the field."'"`UNIQ--ref-00000006-QINU`"')

== Bibliography ==
- Heylin, P. (1851), Bloxam, J.R. (ed.), Memorial of Bishop Waynflete Founder of St Mary Magdalen College, Oxford, Caxton Society, OCLC 16015364
- Levine, P. (1986), The Amateur and the Professional: Historians, Antiquarians and Archaeologists in Victorian England, 1838–1886, Cambridge University Press, ISBN 9780521306355
