= Medieval dance =

Types of dance in medieval Europe

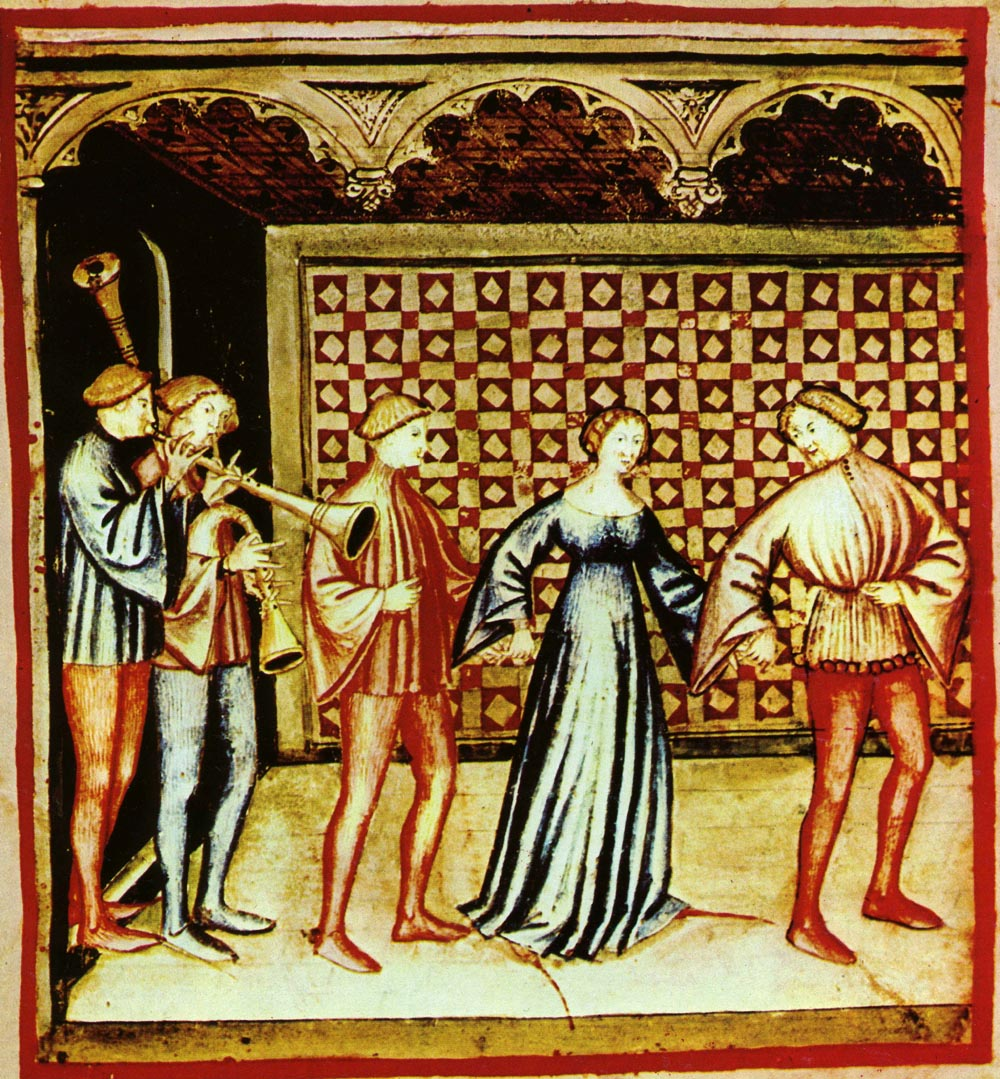
Dance with musicians, Tacuinum sanitatis casanatense (Lombardy, Italy, late 14th century)

Sources for an understanding of dance in Europe in the Middle Ages are limited and fragmentary, being composed of some interesting depictions in paintings and illuminations, a few musical examples of what may be dances, and scattered allusions in literary texts. The first detailed descriptions of dancing only date from 1451 in Italy, which is after the start of the Renaissance in Western Europe.

== Carole ==
The most documented form of secular dance during the Middle Ages is the carol also called the "carole" or "carola" and known from the 12th and 13th centuries in Western Europe in rural and court settings. It consisted of a group of dancers holding hands usually in a circle, with the dancers singing in a leader and refrain style while dancing. No surviving lyrics or music for the carol have been identified. In northern France, other terms for this type of dance included "ronde" and its diminutives "rondet", "rondel", and "rondelet" from which the more modern music term "rondeau" derives. In the German-speaking areas, this same type of choral dance was known as "reigen".

Mullally in his book on the carole makes the case that the dance, at least in France, was done in a closed circle with the dancers, usually men and women interspersed, holding hands. He adduces evidence that the general progression of the dance was to the left (clockwise) and that the steps probably were very simple consisting of a step to the left with the left foot followed by a step on the right foot closing to the left foot.

=== France ===
==== Chretien de Troyes ====
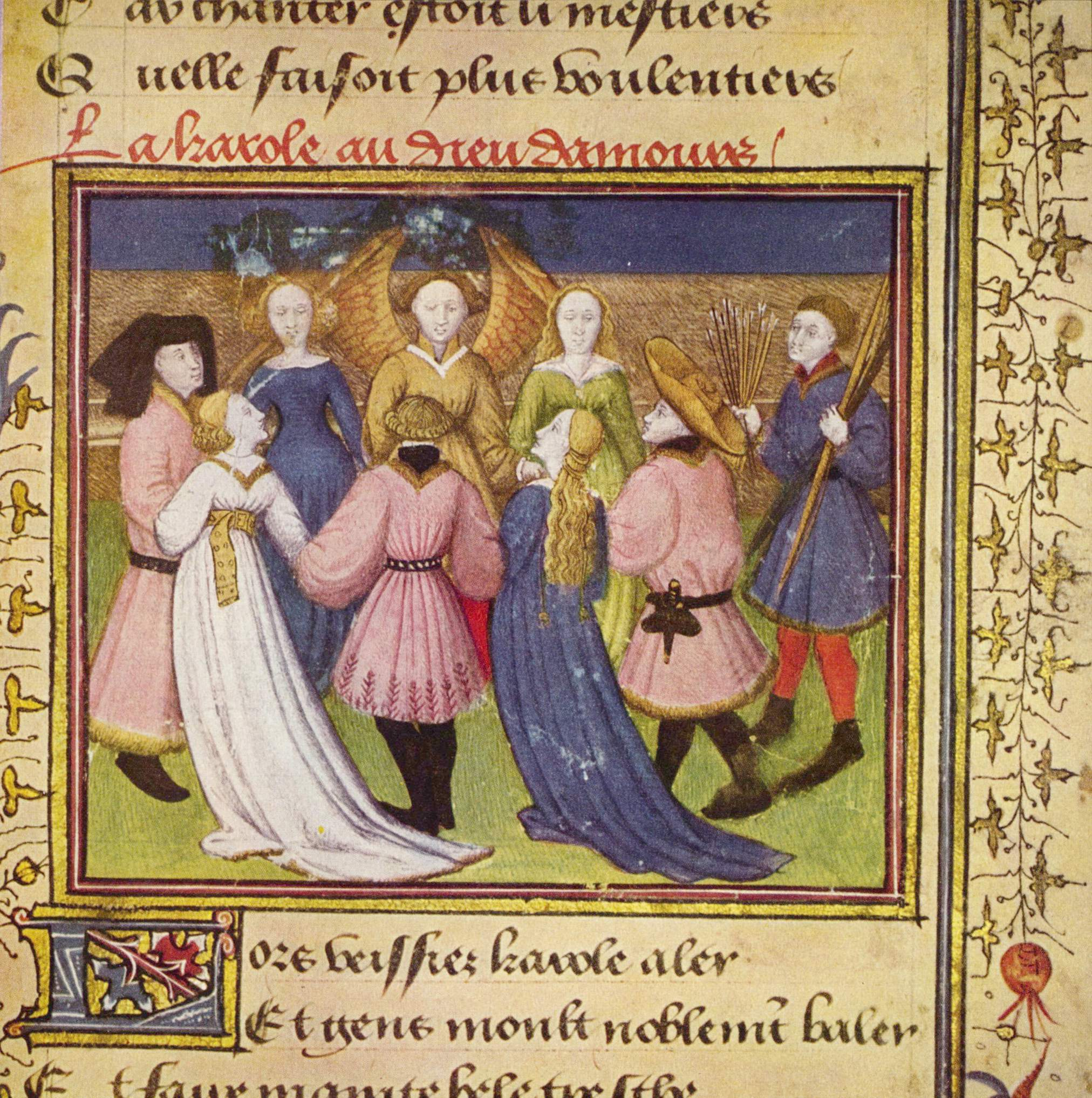
From a manuscript of the Roman de la rose, c. 1430.

Some of the earliest mentions of the carol occur in the works of the French poet Chrétien de Troyes in his series of Arthurian romances. In the wedding scene in Erec and Enide (about 1170)

Puceles carolent et dancent,
Trestuit de joie feire tancent

Maidens performed rounds and other dances, each trying to outdo the other in showing their joy

— lines 2047–2048

In The Knight of the Cart (probably late 1170s) at a meadow where there are knights and ladies, various games are played while:

Li autre, qui iluec estoient,
Redemenoient lor anfances,
Baules et queroles et dance;
Et chantent et tunbent et saillent

[S]ome others were playing at childhood games – rounds, dances and reels, singing, tumbling, and leaping"

— lines 1656–1659

In what is probably Chretien's last work, Perceval, the Story of the Grail, probably written 1181–1191, we find:

Men and women danced rounds through every street and square

and later at a court setting:

The queen ... had all her maidens join hands together to dance and begin the merry-making. In his honour they began their singing, dances, and rounds

=== Italy ===
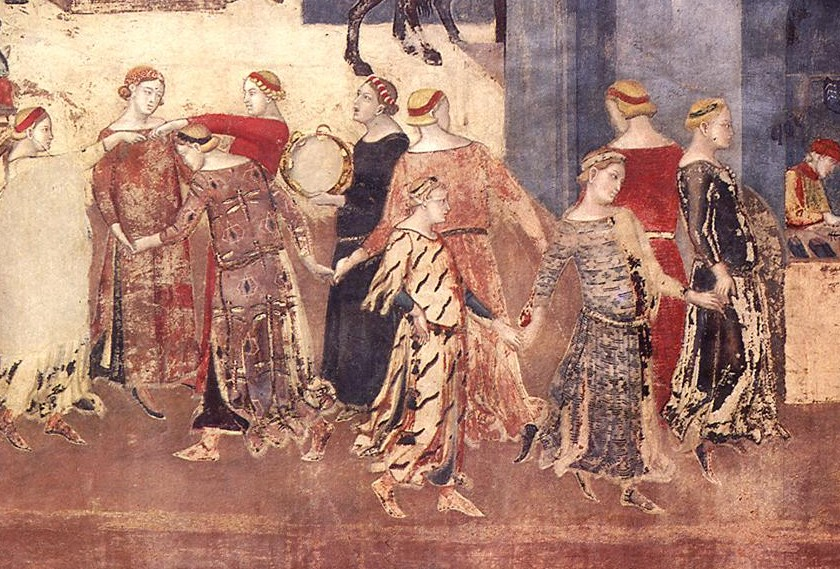
Lorenzetti 1338–1340

Dante (1265–1321) has a few minor references to dance in his works but a more substantive description of the round dance with song from Bologna comes from Giovanni del Virgilio (floruit 1319–1327).

Later in the 14th century Giovanni Boccaccio (1313–1375) shows us the "carola" in Florence in the Decameron (about 1350–1353) which has several passages describing men and women dancing to their own singing or accompanied by musicians. Boccaccio also uses two other terms for contemporary dances, ridda and ballonchio, both of which refer to round dances with singing.

Approximately contemporary with the Decameron are a series of frescos in Siena by Ambrogio Lorenzetti painted about 1338–40, one of which shows a group of women doing a "bridge" figure while accompanied by another woman playing the tambourine.

=== England ===
In a life of Saint Dunstan composed about 1000, the author tells how Dunstan, going into a church, found maidens dancing in a ring and singing a hymn. According to the Oxford English Dictionary (1933) the term "carol" was first used in England for this type of circle dance accompanied by singing in manuscripts dating to as early as 1300. The word was used as both a noun and a verb and the usage of carol for a dance form persisted well into the 16th century. One of the earliest references is in Robert of Brunne's early 14th century Handlyng Synne (Handling Sin) where it occurs as a verb.

== Other chain dances ==
Circle or line dances also existed in other parts of Europe outside England, France and Italy where the term carol was best known. These dances were of the same type with dancers hand-in-hand and a leader who sang the ballad.

=== Scandinavia ===
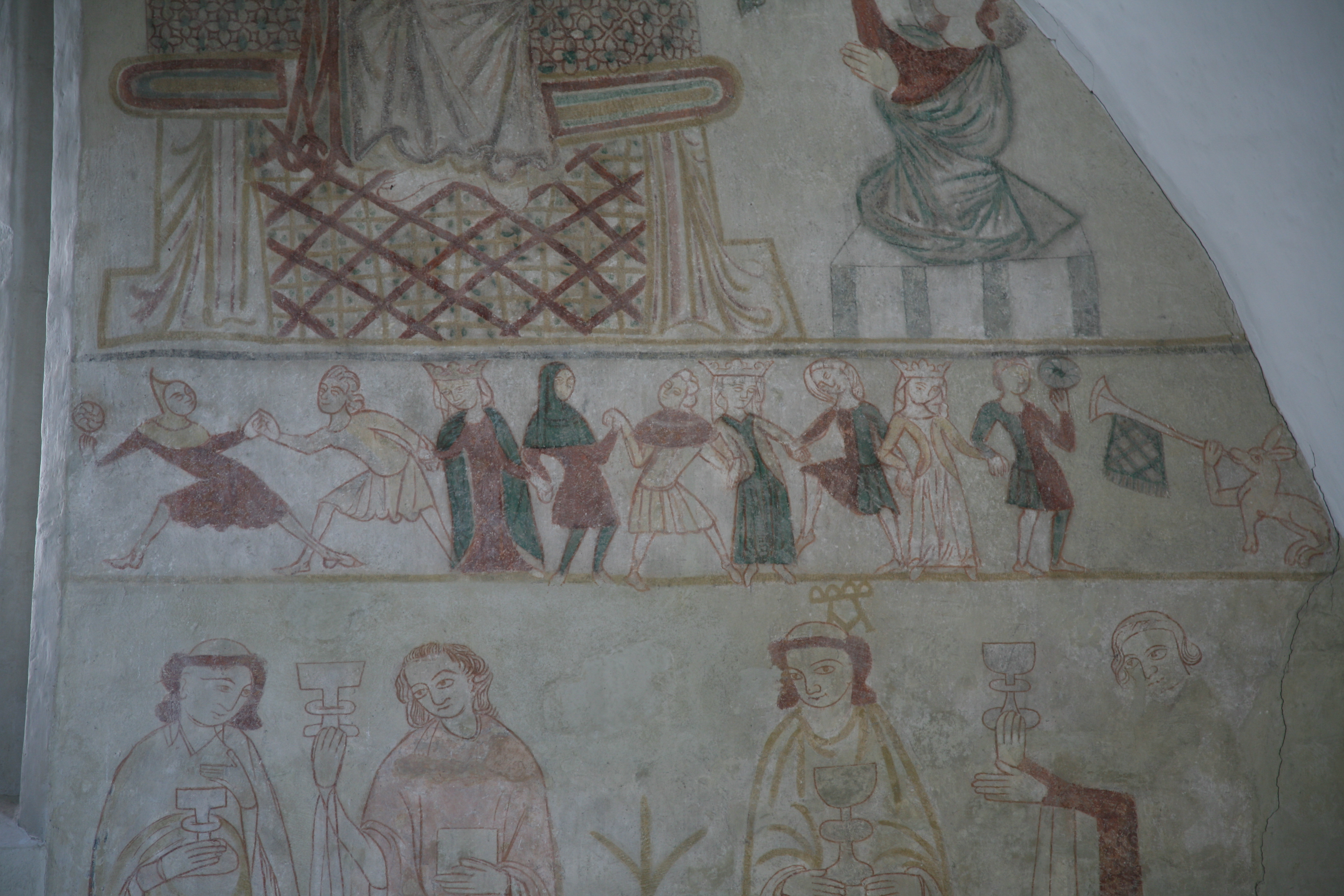
Fresco at Ørslev church, Denmark

In Denmark, old ballads mention a closed Ring dance which can open into a Chain dance. A fresco in Ørslev church in Zealand from about 1400 shows nine people, men and women, dancing in a line. The leader and some others in the chain carry bouquets of flowers. Dances could be for men and women, or for men alone, or women alone. In the case of women's dances, however, there may have been a man who acted as the leader. Two dances specifically named in the Danish ballads which appear to be line dances of this type are The Beggar Dance, and The Lucky Dance which may have been a dance for women. A modern version of these medieval chains is seen in the Faroese chain dance, the earliest account of which goes back only to the 17th century.

In Sweden too, medieval songs often mentioned dancing. A long chain was formed, with the leader singing the verses and setting the time while the other dancers joined in the chorus. These "Long Dances" have lasted into modern times in Sweden. A similar type of song dance may have existed in Norway in the Middle Ages as well, but no historical accounts have been found.

=== Central Europe ===
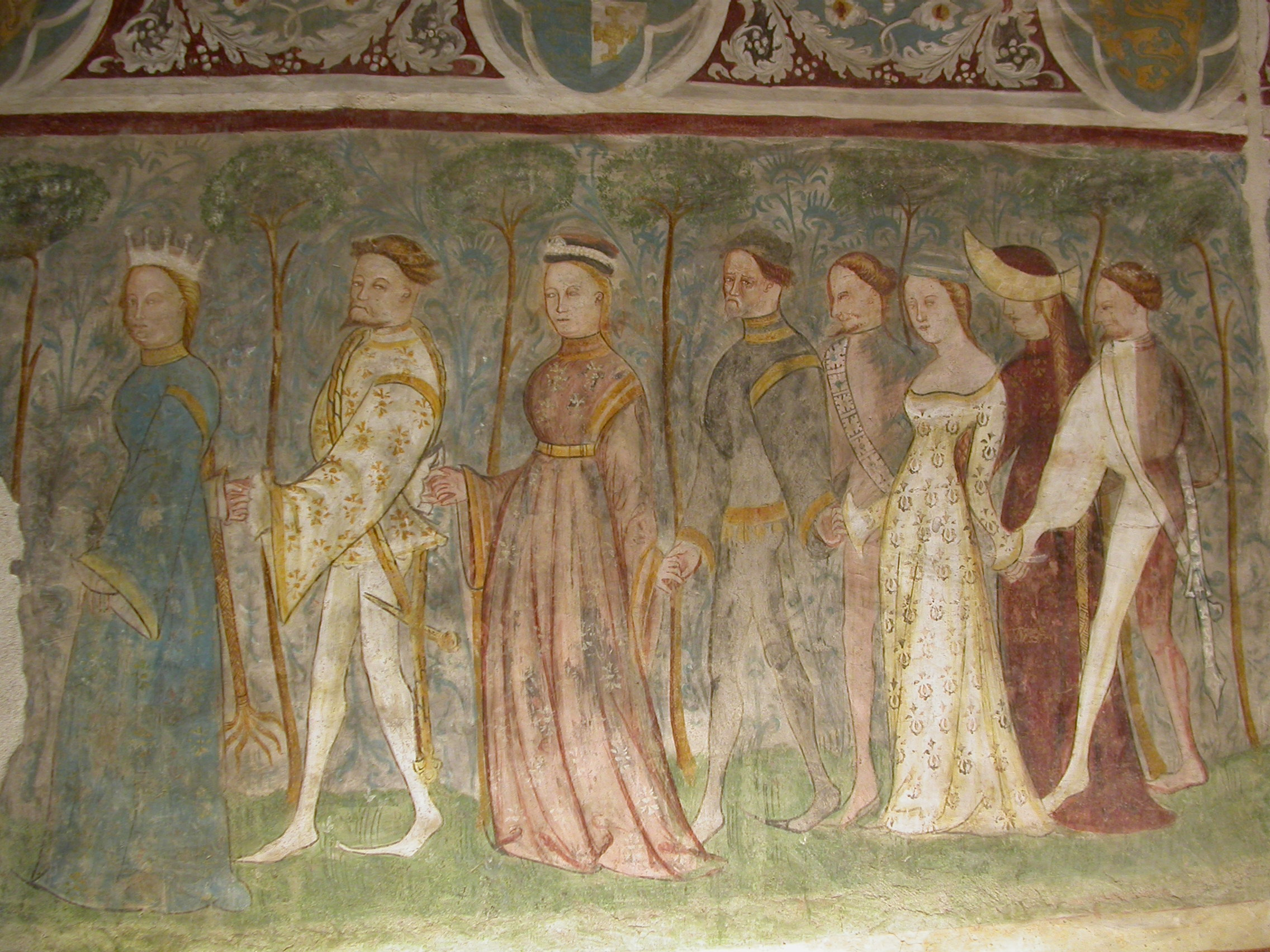
Fresco at Runkelstein Castle, South Tyrol, Italy

The same dance in Germany was called "Reigen" and may have originated from devotional dances at early Christian festivals. Dancing around the church or a fire was frequently denounced by church authorities which only underscores how popular it was. There are records of church and civic officials in various German towns forbidding dancing and singing from the 8th to the 10th centuries. Once again, in singing processions, the leader provided the verse and the other dancers supplied the chorus. The minnesinger Neidhart von Reuental, who lived in the first half of the 13th century wrote several songs for dancing, some of which use the term "reigen".

In southern Tyrol, at Runkelstein Castle, a series of frescos was executed in the last years of the 14th century. One of the frescos depicts Elisabeth of Poland, Queen of Hungary leading a chain dance.

Circle dances were also found in the area that is today the Czech Republic. Descriptions and illustrations of dancing can be found in church registers, chronicles and the 15th century writings of Bohuslav Hasištejnský z Lobkovic. Dancing was primarily done around trees on the village green but special houses for dancing appear from the 14th century. In Poland as well the earliest village dances were in circles or lines accompanied by the singing or clapping of the participants.

=== The Balkans ===
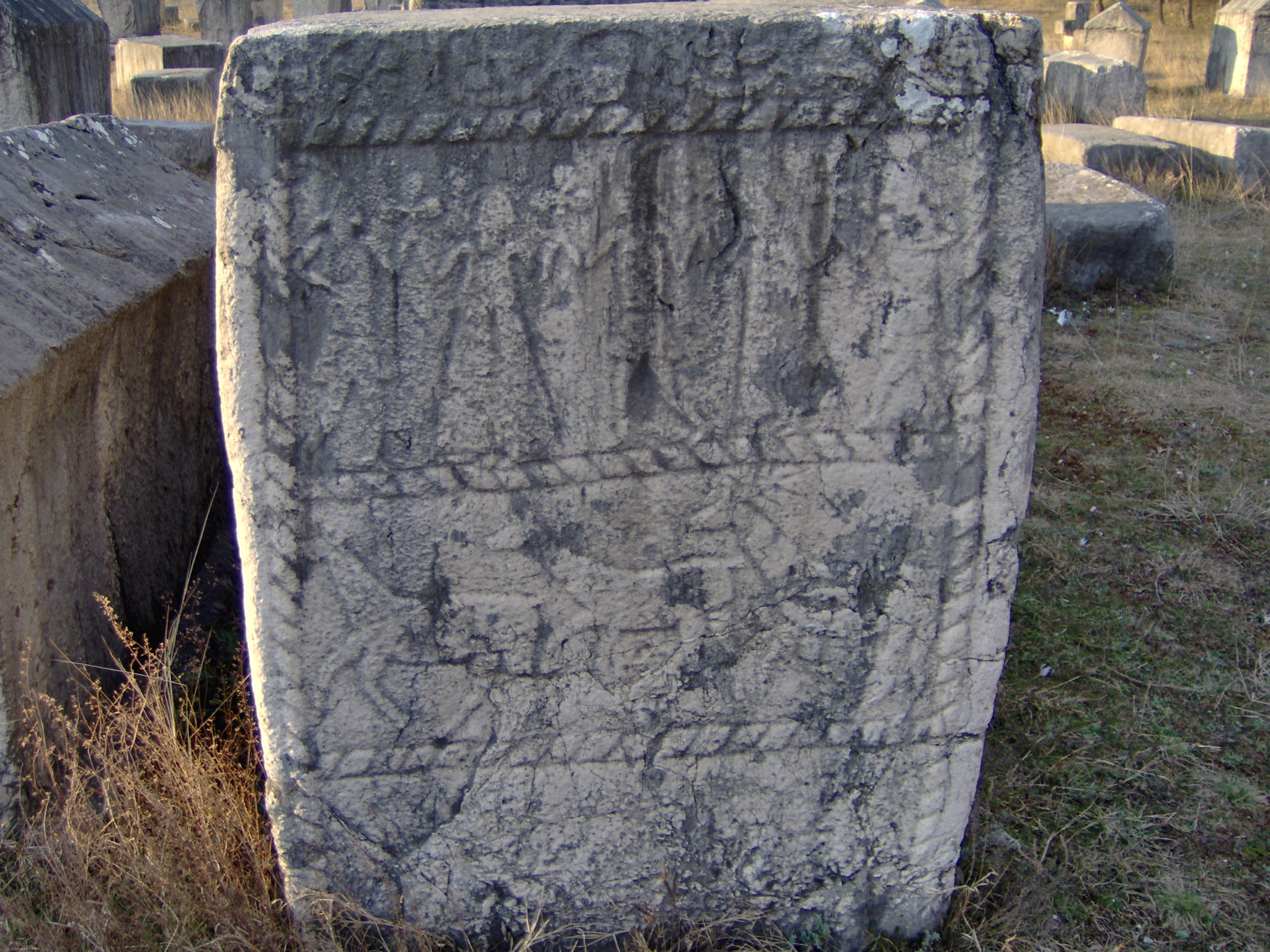
Stecak from Radimlja, Hercegovina showing linked figures

The present-day folk dances in the Balkans consist of dancers linked together in a hand or shoulder hold in an open or closed circle or a line. The basic round dance goes by many names in the various countries of the region: choros, kolo, oro, horo or hora. The modern couple dance so common in western and northern Europe has only made a few inroads into the Balkan dance repertory.

Chain dances of a similar type to these modern dance forms have been documented from the medieval Balkans. Tens of thousands of medieval tombstones called "Stećci" are found in Bosnia and Hercegovina and neighboring areas in Montenegro, Serbia and Croatia. They date from the end of the 12th century to the 16th century. Many of the stones bear inscription and figures, several of which have been interpreted as dancers in a ring or line dance. These mostly date to the 14th and 15th centuries. Usually men and women are portrayed dancing together holding hands at shoulder level but occasionally the groups consist of only one sex.

Further south in Macedonia, near the town of Zletovo, Lesnovo monastery, originally built in the 11th century, was renovated in the middle of the 14th century and a series of murals were painted. One of these shows a group of young men linking arms in a round dance. They are accompanied by two musicians, one playing the kanun while the other beats on a long drum.

There is also some documentary evidence from the Dalmatian coast area of what is now Croatia. An anonymous chronicle from 1344 exhorts the people of the city of Zadar to sing and dance circle dances for a festival while in the 14th and 15th centuries, authorities in Dubrovnik forbid circle dances and secular songs on the cathedral grounds. Another early reference comes from the area of present-day Bulgaria in a manuscript of a 14th-century sermon which calls chain dances "devilish and damned."

At a later period there are the accounts of two western European travelers to Constantinople, the capital of the Ottoman Empire. Salomon Schweigger (1551–1622) was a German preacher who traveled in the entourage of Jochim von Sinzendorf, Ambassador to Constantinople for Rudolf II in 1577. He describes the events at a Greek wedding:

da schrencken sie die Arm uebereinander
machen ein Ring
gehen also im Ring herumb
mit dem Fuessen hart tredent und stampffend
einer singt vor
welchem die andern alle nachfolgen.

then they joined arms one upon the other, made a circle, went round the circle, with their feet stepping hard and stamping; one sang first, with the others all following after.

Another traveler, the German pharmacist Reinhold Lubenau, was in Constantinople in November 1588 and reports on a Greek wedding in these terms:

eine Companei, oft von zehen oder mehr Perschonen, Grichen herfuhr auf den Platz, fasten einander bei den Henden, machten einen runden Kreis und traten balde hinder sich, balde fur sich, balde gingen sie herumb, sungen grichisch drein, balde trampelden sie starck mit den Fussen auf die Erde.

a company of Greeks, often of ten or more persons, stepped forth to the open place, took each other by the hand, made a round circle, and now stepped backward, now forward, sometimes went around, singing in Greek the while, sometimes stamped strongly on the ground with their feet.

== Estampie ==
If the story is true that troubadour Raimbaut de Vaqueiras (about 1150–1207) wrote the famous Provençal song Kalenda Maya to fit the tune of an estampie that he heard two jongleurs play, then the history of the estampie extends back to the 12th century. The only musical examples actually identified as "estampie" or "istanpita" occur in two 14th-century manuscripts. The same manuscripts also contain other pieces named "danse real" or other dance names. These are similar in musical structure to the estampies but consensus is divided as to whether these should be considered the same.

In addition to these instrumental music compositions, there are also mentions of the estampie in various literary sources from the 13th and 14th centuries. One of these as "stampenie" is found in Gottfried von Strassburg's Tristan from 1210 in a catalog of Tristan's accomplishments:

ouch sang er wol ze prise
schanzune und spaehe wise,
refloit und stampenie

he also sang most excellently subtle airs, "chansons", "refloits", and "estampies"

— lines 2293–2295

Later, in a description of Isolde:

Si videlt ir stampenie,
leiche und so vremediu notelin,
diu niemer vremeder kunden sin,
in franzoiser wise
von Sanze und San Dinise.
She fiddled her "estampie", her lays, and her strange tunes in the French style, about Sanze and St Denis

— lines 8058–8062

A century and a half later in the poem La Prison amoreuse (1372–73) by French chronicler and poet Jean Froissart (c. 1337–1405), we find:

La estoient li menestrel
Qui s'acquittoient bien et bel
A piper et tout de novel
Unes danses teles qu'il sorent,
Et si trestot que cessé orent
Les estampies qu'il batoient,
Cil et celes qui s'esbatoient
Au danser sans gueres atendre
Commencierent leurs mains a tendre
Pour caroler.

Here are all the minstrels rare Who now acquit themselves so fair In playing on their pipes whate'er The dances be that one may do. So soon as they have glided through The estampies of this sort Youths and maidens who disport Themselves in dancing now begin With scarce a wait to join hands in The choral

Opinion is divided as to whether the Estampie was actually a dance or simply early instrumental music. Sachs believes the strong rhythm of the music, a derivation of the name from a term meaning "to stamp" and the quotation from the Froissart poem above definitely label the estampie as a dance. However, others stress the complex music in some examples as being uncharacteristic of dance melodies and interpret Froissart's poem to mean that the dancing begins with the carol. There is also debate on the derivation of the word "estampie". In any case, no description of dance steps or figures for the estampie are known.

== Couple dances ==
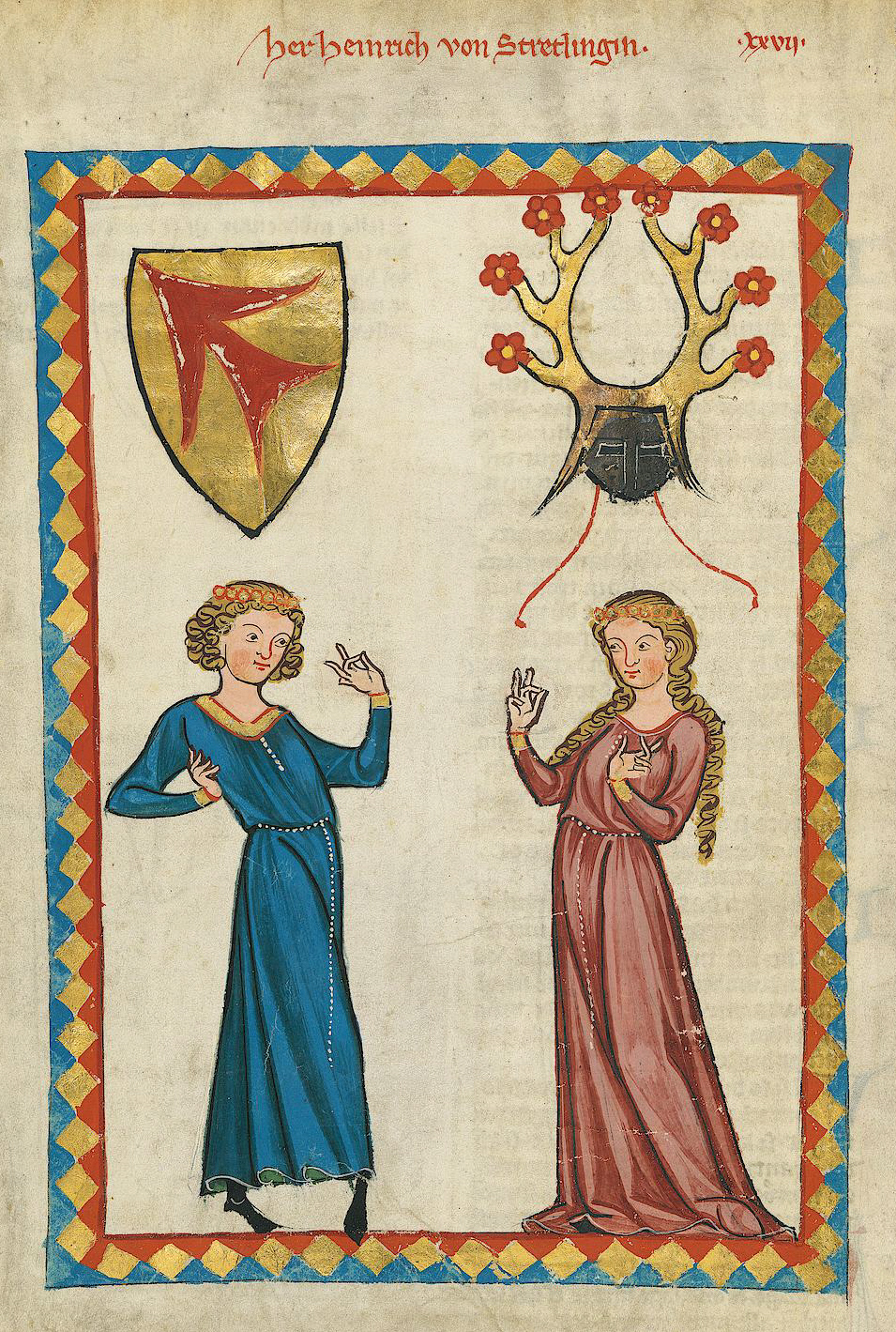
Heinrich von Stretlingen

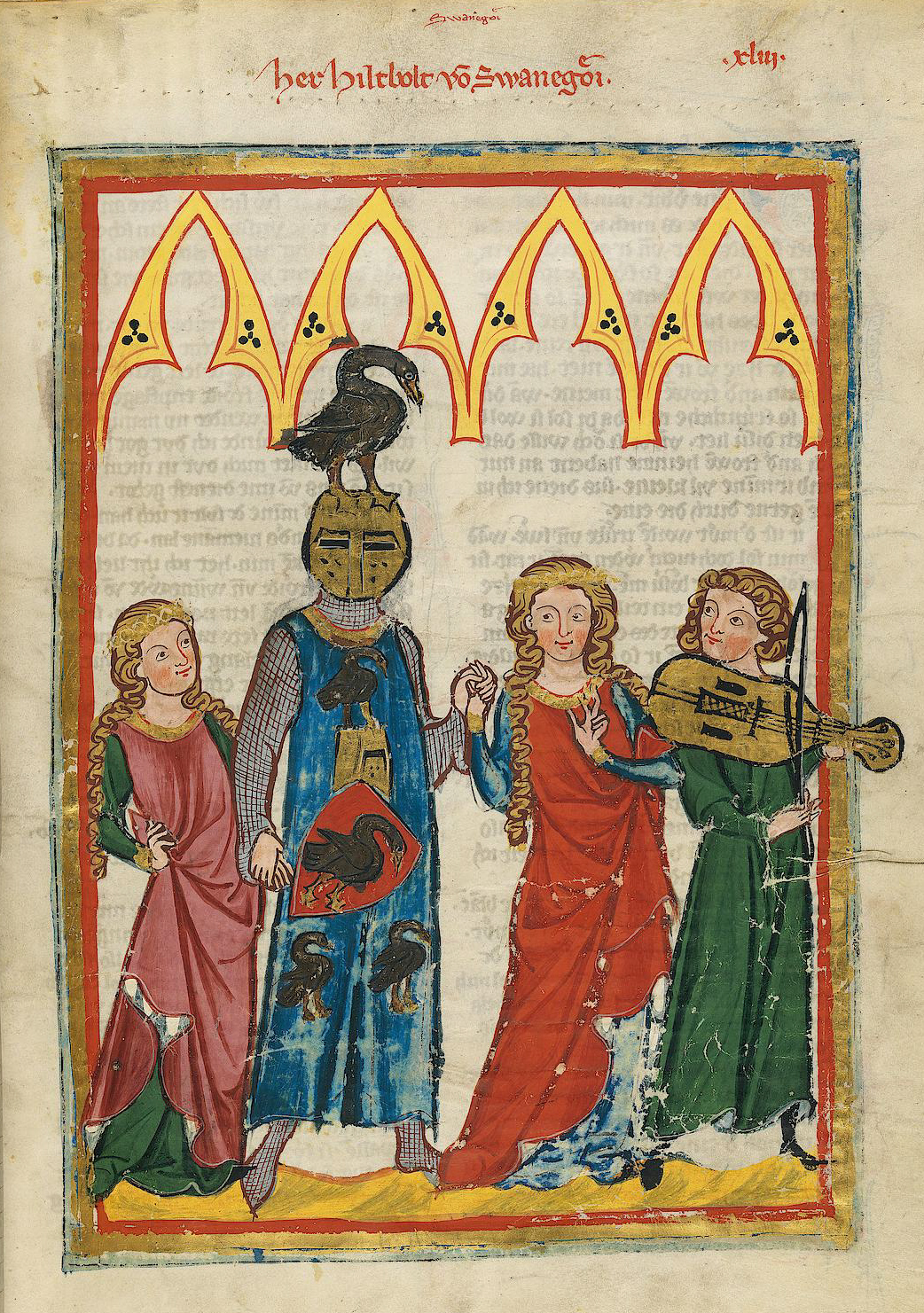
Hiltbolt von Schwangau

According to German dance historian Aenne Goldschmidt, the oldest notice of a couple dance comes from the southern German Latin romance Ruodlieb probably composed in the early to mid-11th century. The dance is done at a wedding feast and is described in the translation by Edwin Zeydel as follows:

the young man arose and the young lady too.
He turns in the manner of a falcon and she like a swallow.
But when they came together, they passed one another again quickly,
he seemed to move (glide) along, she to float.

Another literary mention comes from a later period in Germany with a description of couple dancing in Wolfram von Eschenbach's epic poem Parzival, usually dated to the beginning of the 13th century. The scene occurs on manuscript page 639, the host is Gawain, the tables from the meal have been removed and musicians have been recruited:

Now give your thanks to the host that he did not restrain them in their joy. Many a fair lady danced there in his presence.
The knights mingled freely with the host of ladies, pairing off now with one, now with another, and the dance was a lovely sight.
Together they advanced to the attack on sorrow. Often a handsome knight was seen dancing with two ladies, one on either hand.

Eschenbach also remarks that while many of the noblemen present were good fiddlers, they knew only the old style dances, not the many new dances from Thuringia.

The early 14th century Codex Manesse from Heidelberg has miniatures of many Minnesang poets of the period. The portrait of Heinrich von Stretelingen shows him engaged in a "courtly pair dance" while the miniature of Hiltbolt von Schwangau depicts him in a trio dance with two ladies, one in each hand, with a fiddler providing the music.

== See also ==
- Danse Macabre (Dance of Death)
- Dancing mania, a 14th to 17th century social phenomenon
