= Liber Rubeus =

Liber Rubeus ('red book') may refer to:

- Red Book of the Exchequer
- Letter-Book D of the Letter-Books of the City of London
- Liber Rubeus Bathoniae, sole manuscript of Arthur (poem)
- Cartulaire de la cathédrale de Dax
