= Historians in England during the Middle Ages =

Historians in England during the Middle Ages helped to lay the groundwork for modern historical historiography, providing vital accounts of the early history of England, Wales and Normandy, its cultures, and revelations about the historians themselves. (Note: The term English in the context of this article also includes Welsh and Norman authors who wrote about history relevant to England.)

The 'Golden Age' of medieval English historiography was during the High Middle Ages in the 12th and 13th centuries, when English chroniclers produced works covering a variety of interest and offering a wealth of information. Much of contemporary historical knowledge of the Middle Ages comes from these chronicles.

== Early Middle Ages ==
Prior to the boom in historical writing in the High Middle Ages, the number and quality of works from England's earlier period is often lacking, with some notable exceptions. Later historians lamented the gaps in this period and usually blamed the gaps on Viking invasions. In the 12th century William of Malmesbury said, "in many places in England that knowledge of the deeds of the saints has been wiped out, in my opinion by the violence of enemies".

Below is a list of some of the major and most significant historians and chroniclers of the period:

1. Gildas, On the Ruin of Britain (De Excidio Britanniae) (died 570)
2. Bede, Ecclesiastical History of the English People (Historia ecclesiastica gentis Anglorum) AD 1–731
3. History of Britain (Historia Brittonum) 809 (attributed to Nennius, perhaps falsely)
4. Asser, Life of King Alfred 893
5. Annales Cambriae, Annals of Wales 447–954 (c. 970)
6. Æthelweard, Chronicle (Chronicon Æthelweardi) AD 1–975

== High Middle Ages ==
The High Middle Ages were a golden period for historical writing in England. The craft of history was not a professional subject taught in school, such as the scholastic subjects of logic, theology, law and natural science, but rather something practised by well-educated men of learning, not subjected to the process of systems and procedures of Academia. It was a realm for educated men in monasteries and the courts of kings, bishops and barons, who had the time and position and particular talents to pursue it. As a result, the quality and variety of the histories from this period are highly variable.

Numerous chroniclers prepared detailed accounts of recent history. King Alfred the Great commissioned the Anglo-Saxon Chronicle in 893, and similar chronicles were prepared throughout the Middle Ages. The most famous production is by a transplanted Frenchman, Jean Froissart (1333–1410). His Froissart's Chronicles, written in French, remains an important source for the first half of the Hundred Years' War.

After the Norman Conquest of 1066 there was an explosion of interest in English history. It has been theorized this was due in part to the native English desire to reclaim their cultural identity from the debacle of 1066. As well, the new Norman rulers were interested in discovering who it was they reigned over, which fueled demand for legends of England's early Kings, such as Geoffrey's King Arthur.

=== Characteristics ===
The works of this period are often categorized by chronicles, and by literary histories. Chroniclers recorded events and dates of events with little prose or expansion. For example, the Winchcombe Annals, by a 12th-century monk, wrote one paragraph for each year, no matter how much or little happened, with one sentence for each event in that year. In this way chronicles would often give as much, or more, attention to things of little importance as those things of greater importance.

Unlike chronicles, the literary histories could be classified along with other forms of medieval literature. Indeed, entertainment was considered a legitimate function of historical writing. Historical accounts of battles often included long, and entirely invented, speeches from leaders. Histories were as much a part of medieval literature as other forms, such as the romance. Most of them endeavoured to be readable, arming themselves, as Roger of Wendover does, against both "the listless hearer and the fastidious reader" by "presenting something which each may relish", and so providing for the joint "profit and entertainment of all."

Another characteristic of the histories of the period is that they borrowed heavily from other writers, often directly copying entire works as their own. For example, Henry of Huntingdon's History of the English is only one quarter original, relying in many places on Bede's Historia Ecclesiastica. This process would often be compounded as later writers would copy these works in full or part.

Bede was highly regarded by historians of this period, and later historians lamented the fact that the 223-year period between Bede's death in 735 and Eadmers History of Recent Events (starting in 960) was sparsely represented. William of Malmesbury said of Bede "after him you will not easily find men who turned their minds to the composition of Latin histories of their own people". Henry of Huntingdon referred to Bede as "that holy and venerable man, a man of brilliant mind".

For writing contemporary history, historians could draw on their own eye-witness accounts, reports from those they met and primary source documents such as letters. A good network of contacts was essential, and taking many journeys was common. Clerics assigned to the courts of Kings would often have the best access to information, such as Roger of Howden in Henry I's reign. Although some monks, such as William of Newburgh, never left their monastery, yet he was able to obtain considerable information through the network of story-telling and gossip which existed in the theoretical seclusion and silence of monastic life.

=== List of historians ===
Listed chronologically, by authors death. Dates represent the historical period covered by the work(s). Works and authors listed are not exhaustive. These are the major and most significant historians and chroniclers of the period.

1. Eadmer, History of Recent Events (Historia novorum) 960–1109
2. John of Worcester Chronicon ex chronicis 1–1140
3. William of Malmesbury, Deeds of the English Kings (Gesta regum Anglorum) 449–1120
4. Symeon of Durham, History of the Kings (Historia regum) 616–1129
5. Henry of Huntingdon, History of the English (Historia Anglorum) 55 BC–1129
6. Alfred of Beverley, Annales sive Historia de gestis regum Britanniae 1–1129
7. Orderic Vitalis, Ecclesiastical History (Historia Ecclesiastica) 1–1141,
8. Anglo-Saxon Chronicle 1–1154
9. Deeds of King Stephen (Gesta Stephani) 1–1154
10. William of Newburgh, History of English Affairs (Historia rerum Anglicarum), 1066–1198
11. Gervase of Canterbury, Chronicle (Chronicon), 1135–1199
12. Ralph of Diceto, Images of History (Imagines Historiarum), 1148–1202
13. Roger of Howden, Chronicle (Chronicon) 732–1201
14. Walter Map, Trifles of the Court (De Nugis Curialium) (died 1209/1210)
15. Gerald of Wales, Itinerarium Cambriae 1191, Descriptio Cambriae 1194
16. Ralph of Coggeshall, Chronicle (Chronicon) 1066–1224
17. Roger of Wendover, Flores Historiarum 1202–1235
18. Matthew Paris, Chronica Maiora (died 1259)
19. Piers Langtoft, Langtoft's Chronicle (Chronicon) (died 1307)
20. Nicholas Trivet, Annales sex regum Angliae 1135–1307
21. Robert Mannyng, Chronicle (Chronica) (translations of earlier work, through 1338)

==== Geoffrey of Monmouth ====
Geoffrey of Monmouth is singled out from the list because, on the one hand, he was one of the most popular historians in England of this period. On the other hand, his Historia Regum Britanniae (History of the Kings of Britain) was considered almost entirely fiction and was not considered authentic history by some other contemporary historians. Kings of Britain covers the legend of King Arthur as well as other Welsh legends of the early period of England, and was presented, and often accepted, as actual English history. It was extremely popular, but other contemporary historians, interested in impartiality and truth, were highly critical of Geoffrey. William of Newburgh devotes an extended section of the preface of Historia to discredit Geoffrey, saying at one point "only a person ignorant of ancient history would have any doubt about how shamelessly and impudently he lies in almost everything". The discussion over the historical basis for King Arthur continues to this day.

== See also ==
- List of English chronicles
- Historiography of the United Kingdom
