= Roman de Rou =

Norman verse chronicle by Wace

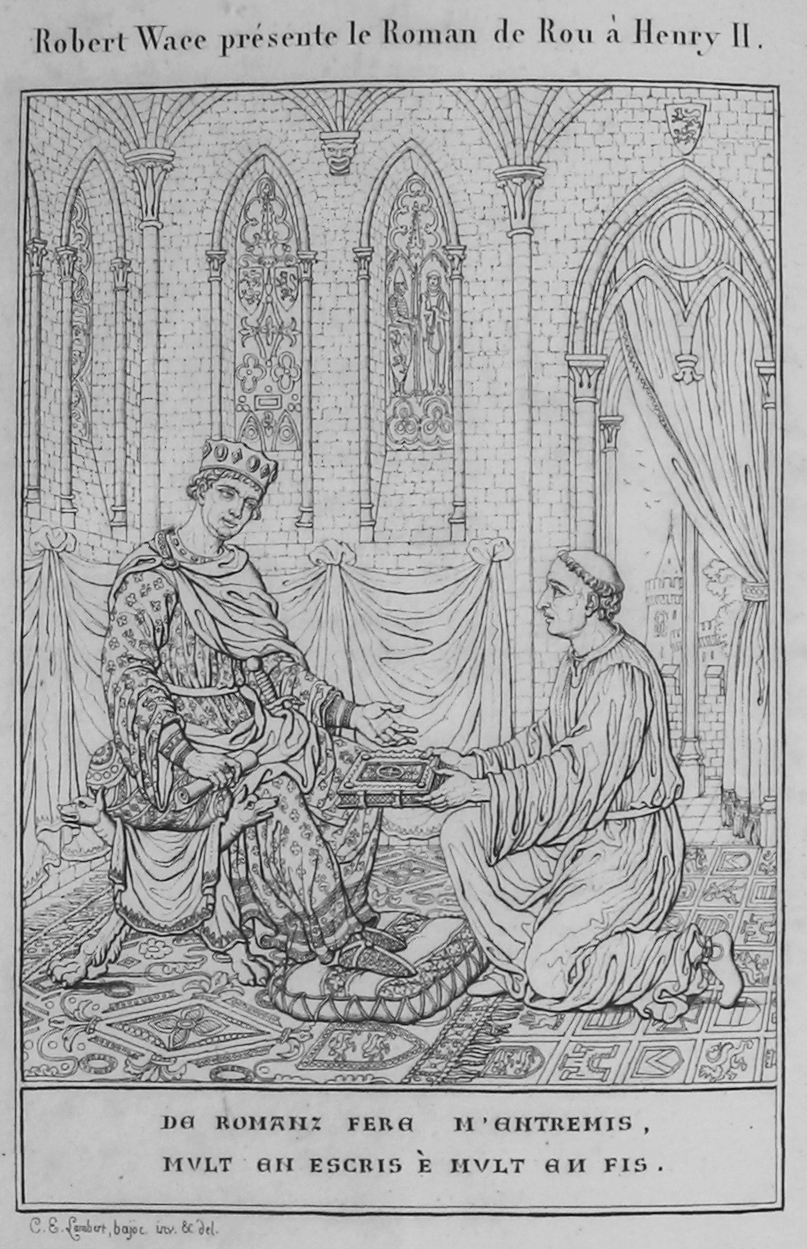
Wace presents his Roman de Rou to Henry II in this illustration from 1824

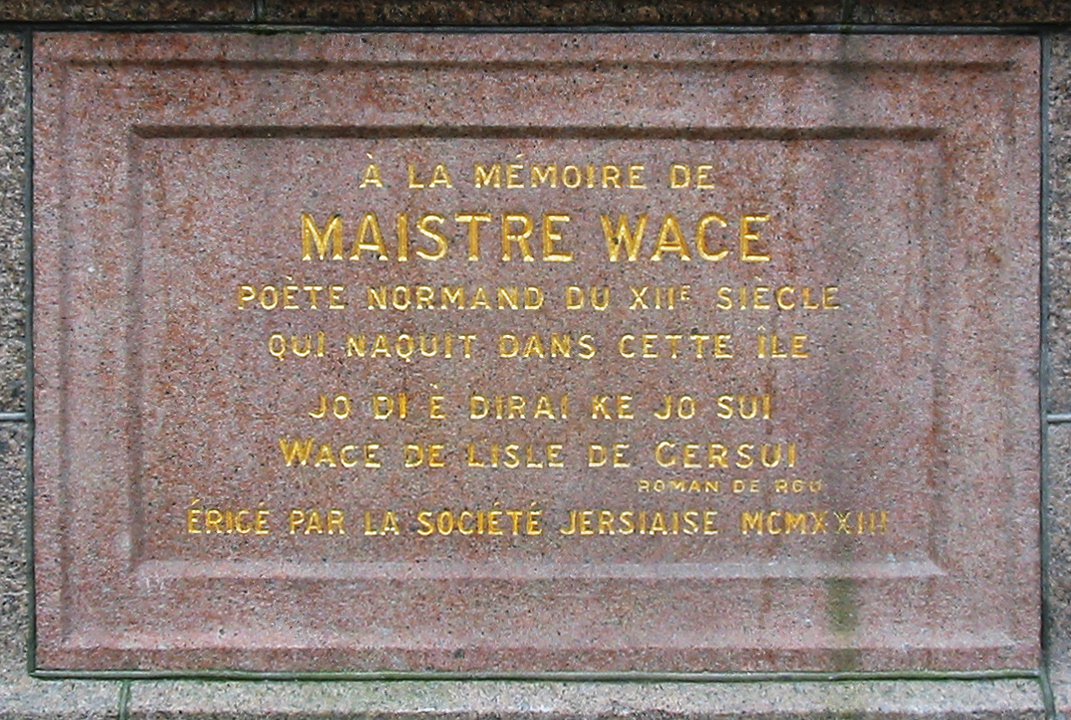
As quoted on this monument in Saint Helier, Wace informs the reader of the Roman de Rou that he was born in Jersey

Roman de Rou ("Romance of Rollo") is a verse chronicle by Wace in Norman covering the history of the Dukes of Normandy from the time of Rollo of Normandy to the Battle of Tinchebray in 1106. It is a national epic of Normandy.

Following the success of his Roman de Brut, which recounted the history of the Britons, Wace was apparently commissioned by Henry II of England to write a similar account of the origins of the Normans and their conquest of England. Wace abandons his tale before bringing it up to date. He tells the reader in the final lines of Part III, that the king had entrusted the same task to a Maistre Beneeit (believed to be Benoît de Sainte-More).

The work was started in the year 1160, and Wace seems to have performed his last revisions in the mid-1170s.

== Composition ==
The work consists of:

- a 315-line account of the Dukes in reverse chronological order known as the Chronique Ascendante. This is believed by some scholars not to be an original part of the Rou, but a separate work by Wace.
- a 4,425-line section in alexandrines known as Part II
- an 11,440-line section in octosyllables known as Part III

A 750-line section known as Le Romaunz de Rou et des dus de Normendie appended in some editions appears to be an early draft that was, abandoned and later reworked into the final redaction.

== Sources ==
Wace used as sources for his history of the Dukes of Normandy:

- Gesta Normannorum Ducum
- De moribus et actis primorum Normanniae ducum by Dudo of Saint-Quentin
- Gesta Guillelmi by William of Poitiers
- Gesta regum Anglorum by William of Malmesbury
- Brevis relatio de Guillelmo nobilissimo comite Normannorum
- oral tradition, including information from his father, and his own eyewitness

== See also ==
- Anglo-Norman literature
