= Arthur (poem) =

Arthur is an anonymous Middle English poem, derived indirectly from Geoffrey of Monmouth's Historia Regum Britanniae, of the life and reign of King Arthur. It dates from the late 14th century or early 15th century and survives in only one manuscript, the early 15th century Liber Rubeus Bathoniae. It comprises 642 lines of, for the most part, rhyming couplets. It lies somewhere between the genres of chivalric romance and verse chronicle. Critics are largely agreed that it is a work of slight literary merit.

== Synopsis ==
Arthur, son of Uther Pendragon and Ygerne, the countess of Cornwall, is crowned in succession to his father. He is a well-loved king. From his Round Table in Caerleon he conquers Scotland, Ireland, and Gotland, then, after twelve years of peace, takes his army to Paris, where with his sword, Brownsteel, he bests the Roman governor Frollo in a duel. Say a Paternoster for him! He conquers further provinces of France and gives lands to his men, then returns to Britain, where, at Easter, he holds a feast for his royal and noble friends, named at length. Say a Pater and an Ave for him! Messengers bring a letter from the outraged Roman emperor, Lucius, demanding tribute from him. Arthur prevents his guests from killing the messenger and responds by sending his own defiance to Lucius, setting out his hereditary right to France and demanding tribute in his own turn. Lucius is a mighty enemy, the messengers warn Arthur. A Paternoster and an Ave!

Arthur gathers an army of 200,000 and, leaving Britain in the hands of Mordred, sails from Southampton to Barfleur. Paternoster! A Spanish giant has meanwhile appeared there, and has ravished and killed king Hoel's cousin, the fair Elaine. Arthur, aided by Bedivere and Kay, finds and kills the giant, then builds a chapel to house Elaine's tomb. On learning that Lucius is approaching with an army of over 400,000 men, both Christians and Saracens, he prays for divine aid. Paternoster! Arthur wins the ensuing battle, Lucius and Bedivere both being among the slain, and Arthur and his men thank God for the victory. The poet pauses to outline the different ethnicities of Britain and Brittany. Paternoster! About to march on Rome, Arthur hears that Mordred has betrayed him. He sails back to Britain and wins a battle against Mordred, who flees to Cornwall. Reinforced by men from the North, Arthur marches on Cornwall and fights another battle, in which Mordred is killed and Arthur mortally injured. He is taken to Glastonbury, dies, and is buried there. Paternoster and Ave! Whoever wishes to know more must consult the French book. Amen!

== Manuscript ==
Arthur survives in only one manuscript, Longleat MS 55, known as the Liber Rubeus Bathoniae or Red Book of Bath, which is preserved in the library of Longleat House in Wiltshire. This is a parchment manuscript produced at some time between 1412 and 1428, probably in Bath and perhaps in Bath Cathedral Priory. Since 1703 it has been owned by the marquesses of Bath, whose home Longleat is. The manuscript was reported in the mid-19th century to have suffered a good deal of fading, and in places it is now almost or entirely illegible. Much the greater part of it is the work of one copyist who wrote in a cursiva anglicana hand with some Secretary characteristics. It includes 38 texts, mostly in Latin prose. One of these, a Latin chronicle, is interrupted midway in its account of Arthur's reign by a poem in Middle English, Arthur, which takes up the story again from Arthur's begetting and coronation.

== Date and authorship ==
Arthur was written in the late 14th century or early 15th century. The name of the poet is not known, but a certain amount can be inferred about him. The poem's frequent exhortations to say a Paternoster or an Ave strongly suggest that he was a churchman, though the possibility has also been raised that he was one of the "translator-versifiers, poor hacks one notch above the scribes, who earned their bread in the manuscript shops." More can be deduced from the dialect of the poem, which is south-western English.

== Metre ==
Arthur is written in four-stress lines, arranged for the most part in rhyming couplets, though there are also three isolated quatrains rhyming abab. These all occur in the first half of the poem, raising the possibility that the poet eventually gave the idea up as too complicated.

== Sources ==
Robert W. Ackerman, writing in 1959, suggested that the copyist of the Latin chronicle in the Liber Rubeus Bathoniae might have written Arthur himself as an English translation of the account of Arthur's life in that chronicle. In 1960 J. Finlayson, followed in 1999 by Karen Hodder, considered it to have been based instead on some version of Wace's Roman de Brut modified by Layamon's Brut and the Alliterative Morte Arthure. In 2012 Erik Kooper and Julia Marvin presented evidence for believing the Original Version of the Anglo-Norman Prose Brut to have been Arthur's major source, with the Roman de Brut as a possible minor source. They also argued that his treatment of his sources demonstrated a nationalistic outlook, a greater interest in Wales and the Welsh than in Scotland and the Scots, and a tendency towards moral and pious admonition.

== Reception ==
For Arthur's first scholarly editor, Frederick J. Furnivall, it was not without literary merit. "That it has power in some parts", he wrote, "I hope few will deny." Karen Hodder, while complaining of its "trite formulaic phrases and tags", conceded that its treatment of the duel between Arthur and Frollo "does justice to a singularly stirring event in Wace's poem". However, the scholarly verdict has otherwise been markedly negative. W. R. J. Barron objected to Arthur's "tedious apparatus of names, lists, [and] explanations", and Ackerman to "the crude monotony of its verse". John Edwin Wells dismissed the author as having "little imagination, no sense of proportion, no poetical power". The poem has been called "crude and unimaginative in treatment" by Daniel P. Nastali and Philip C. Boardman, "grotesquely inept" and "a wretched mangling of Geoffrey of Monmouth" by Derek Pearsall, and "in all respects the least successful of the surviving English treatments of the Matter of Britain" by George Kane.

== Editions ==
- Crocker, A. (1788). "King Arthur. A Poem". The Gentleman's Magazine. 58: 820–821, 1012, 1172–1175.
- Furnivall, Frederick J. (1869). Arthur: A Short Sketch of His Life and History in English Verse of the First Half of the Fifteenth Century. Original Series, 2. London: N. Trübner for the Early English Text Society.
- Bryan, Mildred Willingham (1977). A Critical Edition and Verse Translation of Arthur (PhD thesis). University of Alabama.
- Pots, Marije; Kooper, Erik (2011). "Arthur: A New Critical Edition of the Fifteenth-Century Middle English Verse Chronicle". The Medieval Chronicle. 7: 239–266. JSTOR 48579288.
