= Exemplum =

Moral anecdote used to illustrate a point

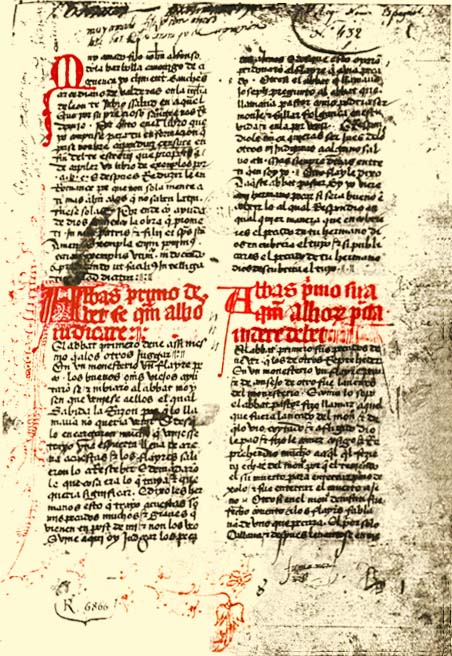
A page from Libro de los exemplos por a. b. c. by Clemente Sánchez de Vercial

An exemplum (plural: exempla or exemplums; meaning "byspel" or "example" in Latin) is a moral anecdote, brief or extended, real or fictitious, used to illustrate a point. The word is also used to express an action performed by another and used as an example or model.

== Exemplary literature ==
In late-medieval literature and sermons exempla were didactic moral teachings, usually based on saints' lives or other people who exemplified a moral ideal. In some cases, an exemplum could be a symbolic natural phenomenon—like Etienne de Bourbon's book depicting an earthquake as divine punishment for the "sin against nature".

Collections of exempla helped medieval preachers to adorn their sermons, to emphasize moral conclusions or illustrate a point of doctrine. The subject matter could be taken from fables, folktales, legends, real history, or natural history. Jacques de Vitry's book of exempla, c. 1200, Nicholas Bozon's Les contes moralisés (after 1320), and Odo of Cheriton's Parabolae (after 1225) were famous medieval collections aimed particularly at preachers. Geoffrey Chaucer's The Miller's Prologue and Tale became a vivid satire on this genre. There were also notable lay writers of moral tales, such as the 13th-century Der Stricker and the 14th-century Juan Manuel, Prince of Villena (Tales of Count Lucanor). Examples dealing with historical figures include:

- Suetonius's De vita Caesarum or Lives of the Twelve Caesars
- Plutarch's Parallel Lives
- Jerome's De viris illustribus
- Petrarch's De viris illustribus
- Chaucer's The Legend of Good Women
- Boccaccio's On Famous Women and On the Fates of Illustrious Men
- Christine de Pizan's The Book of the City of Ladies
- Mirror for Magistrates by various Tudor authors

== Three examples of exempla ==
The Norton Anthology of Western Literature includes three exempla (singular, exemplum), stories that illustrate a general principle or underscore a moral lesson: "The Two City Dwellers and the Country Man" and "The King's Tailor's Apprentice" (both from The Scholar's Guide) and "The Cursed Dancers of Colbeck."

=== "The Two City Dwellers and the Country Man" ===
In "The Two City Dwellers and the Country Man," told by the father, the three traveling companions of the tale's title are on a pilgrimage to Mecca. Near their destination, their provisions are nearly depleted, and the two city dwellers attempt to cheat the country man by telling him that whoever of them dreams the most extraordinary dream shall get the last of their bread.

As the city dwellers sleep, the country man, alert to their intended deception, eats the half-baked bread before retiring.

The city dwellers relate their made-up dreams. One says he was taken to heaven and led before God by angels. The other says that angels escorted him to hell.

The country man says he dreamed the same things that his companions dreamed and, believing them to be forever lost, one to heaven and the other to hell, ate the bread.

The son tells his father the moral of the story: "As it says in the proverb, 'He who wanted all, lost all.'" He says that the two city dwellers got their just comeuppance. The story says that he wishes they'd been whipped, as the antagonist in another story he has heard was beaten for his chicanery. His comment is a transition to the next tale, causing the father to ask his son to tell him this story. Thus, the father, who was the storyteller, becomes the listener, and the son, who was his father's audience, becomes the narrator.

=== "The King And His Wife" ===
The son recounts the story of a king's tailor's assistant, a youth by the name of Nedui.

One day while he is away, his master gives the other apprentices bread and honey, but does not save any for Nedui, telling them that Nedui "would not eat honey even if he were here." Upon learning that he has been left out, Nedui avenges himself upon his master by telling the eunuch whom the king has set over the apprentices as their supervisor that the tailor is subject to seizures of madness, during which he becomes violent and dangerous. In fact, Nedui claims, he has killed those who have happened to be near him when he is in the grip of such a fit. To protect himself, Nedui says, he binds and beats the tailor when such a fit comes over him. He also tells the eunuch what to look for: "When you see him looking all around and feeling the floor with his hands and getting up from his seat and picking up the chair on which he is seated, then you will know that he is mad, and if you do not protect yourself and your servants, he will beat you on the head with a club."

The next day, Nedui hides the tailor's shears, and, when the master, hunting for them, behaves as Nedui mentioned to the eunuch, the eunuch orders his servants to bind the tailor and beats him himself with a club. His servants also beat him until he is unconscious and "half dead."

When he regains consciousness, the tailor asks the eunuch what crime he has committed to have deserved such a beating, and the eunuch tells him what Nedui told him about the tailor's seizures. "Friend, when have you ever seen me crazy?" the master asks his apprentice, to which question he receives, from Nedui, the rejoinder: "When have you ever seen me refuse to eat honey?"

The father tells the son the moral of the story: "The tailor deserved his punishment because if he had kept the precept of Moses, to love his brother as himself, this would not have happened to him."

By having the listener tell the narrator the moral of the story, the storyteller shows that the narrative has successfully served its purpose as an exemplum, as the listener, hearing the story, shows that he is able to ascertain the moral that the tale is intended to express.

=== "The Cursed Dancers of Colbeck" ===
The third exemplum, "The Cursed Dancers of Colbeck," is a prose, rather than a poetic, narrative. Like a mini-sermon, it preaches against wrong conduct—in this case, sacrilegious behavior. This tale has an identifiable author, Robert Mannyng, who set down the story in the early fourteenth century. The Norton Anthology's version is translated by Lee Patterson from the Middle English Handlyng Synne. A prose version of it appears in the early 12th century Gesta Regum Anglorum by William of Malmesbury, which in turn was probably taken from the Translatio Sanctae Edithae by Goscelin under the literary influence of the nunnery at Wilton Abbey.

To bolster his listener's belief that "most of" his tale is "the gospel truth," the narrator names the culprits and their victims and cites Pope Leo as one who knows (and wrote a version of) the narrative and points out that the story is "known in the court at Rome" and has appeared widely in many chronicles, including those "beyond the sea." However, after the telling of the tale, the storyteller admits that some doubt its veracity.

The story starts by identifying several activities that are not allowed in church or in the churchyard: "carols, wrestling, or summer games." In addition, "interludes or singing, beating the tabor [a small drum], or piping. . . . while the priest is conducting mass" are "forbidden" and sacrilegious, and "good priests" will not tolerate them.

It is also improper to dance in church, as the story that the narrator is about to tell demonstrates.

When "twelve fools" in Colbeck (or, as the editors' note explains, "Kolbigk, in Saxony, an area in eastern Germany, just north of the present-day Czech border") decided, one Christmas Eve, to make "a carol—madly, as a kind of challenge," and persisted in singing and dancing in the churchyard while the priest was trying to conduct Mass, despite his entreaties to them to stop, the priest calls upon God to curse them.

The singers' carol contains three lines, the last of which appears to become the basis of their curse, as they are unable to leave the churchyard or to quit singing or dancing for a year after God curses them for their sacrilegious behavior:

By the leafy wood rode Bovoline,
With him he led the fair Mersewine.
Why are we waiting? Why don't we go?

As a result of the curse, the dancers cannot stop singing and dancing; neither can they let go of one another's hands.

The priest, too late, sends his son, Ayone, to rescue his daughter, Ave, who is one of the "twelve fools" involved in the dancing. However, due to the curse, when Ayone takes his sister's arm to separate her from the other carolers, it detaches from her body. Miraculously, her wound does not bleed, nor does she die from it.

Ayone takes the arm to his father. The priest tries, three times unsuccessfully, to bury the limb, but the grave casts it back, so the priest displays it inside the church. Everyone, including the emperor, comes to see the cursed dancers, who, despite no rest, food, drink, or sleep, dance non-stop, night and day, regardless of the temperature or the weather. Several times, the emperor orders a covering to be built to protect the dancers from storms, but it is reduced to rubble overnight each time it is built or rebuilt.

After the year has ended, the curse is lifted, and the dancers fall down upon the ground, as if dead. Three days later, they arise—except for Ave, who has died. Soon after, the priest also dies. The emperor installs the container in the church as a receptacle for the dead girl's arm, and it becomes a holy relic commemorating the miracle of the curse.

The other dancers cannot get together again, ever, and must skip, instead of walking, wherever they go. Living mementoes of God's curse against sacrilegious behavior, they bear permanent physical changes to their clothing and their bodies: "Their clothes didn't rot nor their nails grow; their hair didn't lengthen nor their complexion change. Nor did they ever have relief..."

Although some believe and others doubt the authenticity of the tale he's told, the narrator says he recounted the story so that his listeners, taking heed, may be "afraid to carol in a church or churchyard, especially against the priest's will," as "jangling is a form of sacrilege."

== Bibliography ==
- The Norton Anthology of Western Literature, Volume I. Sarah Lawall (Gen. Ed.). New York: W. W. Norton & Company, 2006.
