= Rhyming Chroniclers =

Rhyming Chroniclers, a series of writers who flourished in England in the 13th century, and related histories of the country in rhyme, in which the fabulous occupies a conspicuous place, among which Layamon's Brut (1205) takes the lead. One of them was John Hardyng (1378–1465).
