= Peter Langtoft =

English historian (died c. 1305)

Peter Langtoft, also known as Peter of Langtoft (Old French: Piers de Langtoft; French: Pierre de Langtoft; died c. 1305), was an English historian and chronicler who took his name from the small village of Langtoft in the East Riding of Yorkshire.

Langtoft was an Augustinian canon regular at Bridlington Priory who wrote a history of England in Anglo-Norman verse, popularly known as Langtoft's Chronicle. The history narrates the history of England from the legendary founding of Britain by Brutus to the death of King Edward I. The first part of Langtoft's chronicle is translated from Wace's Roman de Brut ("Tale of Brutus"), and the second part is drawn from a number of sources, including Henry of Huntingdon's Historia Anglorum ("History of the English"). The third part is widely considered to be original work by Langtoft, and he includes in it details not recorded elsewhere such as the fate of Gwenllian, daughter of Llywelyn ap Gruffudd, Prince of Wales. On the whole, the chronicle is virulently anti-Scottish and famously contains nine 'songs', in both Anglo-Norman and Middle English, supposedly capturing the taunts between English and Scottish soldiers during the Anglo-Scottish conflicts of the late 13th and early 14th centuries.

Langtoft's Chronicle was the source of the second part of the Chronicle of Robert Mannyng, also known as Robert of Brunne, completed around 1338. Piers Langtoft's Chronicle as translated, illustrated, and improved by Mannyng was later transcribed and published in two volumes by Thomas Hearne in 1725.
