= Nicholas Bozon =

Anglo-Norman writer

Nicholas Bozon (fl. c. 1320), or Nicole Bozon, was an Anglo-Norman writer and Franciscan friar who spent most of his life in the East Midlands and East Anglia. He was a prolific author in prose and verse, and composed a number of hagiographies of women saints, reworkings of fables, and allegories.

== Life ==
What we know of Bozon is what can be inferred from his work. He may have belonged to the Bozon family of Whissonsett, Norfolk, or to the Bozon family from Screveton. He may have studied at Oxford University. He was, by his own admission, del ordre de freres menours ("of the order of the Friars Minor"), and probably associated with the Nottingham friary, since he refers in his own writings to the Trent and Derwent rivers, and linguistic evidence from the occasional English proverb or word also points to that area. In the allegorical poem "Char d'orgueil" he specifically calls himself ordeynours, probably indicating the privilege of granting absolution, a privilege (normally reserved for bishops) that had been granted to the Franciscan friars of Nottingham; Bozon's use of the term indicates "a friar who had full authority to hear confession and administer absolution".

== Works ==
Most of Bozon's literary works can be classified as allegories, Marian poems, saints' lives, and sermons. He wrote both in prose and in verse, and it has been noted that his prose fables contain what was called the "débris of French verses", leading some editors to print the material in verse. His allegories include the Char d'orgueil ("where the individual parts of the car are made to represent different aspects of the sin of pride"), and the Passion, a soteriological allegory, in which Christ, a knight in love and dressed in the coat-of-arms of Adam, his squire, fights Belial to save his lover, Humanity. He also wrote a satire of corruption, the Plainte d'amour, perhaps inspired by the papal bull Exivi de paradiso (1312). His most famous work, the aptly titled Contes moralisés ("Moralising Tales"), probably composed sometime after 1320, is a collection of exempla, probably for use in sermons. It includes fables, contemporary anecdotes, and facts taken from bestiaries. The tales have been much appreciated for their worldly curiosity and "down-to-earth attitude". Though Nicholas wrote in Anglo-Norman, he occasionally finished his fables with a proverb in Middle English, such as his version of the fox who attempts to catch an animal by making it believe the reflection of the moon in a well is a cheese. He also used some English words (e.g. "wapentak").

What is now called his "Gospel Poem", already edited by Paul Meyer from the Rawlinson Poetry MS 241 and then called Le Evangel translaté de latin en frranceys, was identified as Bozon's definitively by Sister M. Amelia Klenke in a 1951 article and then published, with six hagiographies of women saints by Bozon (based on the Golden Legend), as Seven More Poems by Nicholas Bozon. The text she used was BL Cotton Domitian xi. Five other manuscripts contain the poem, and William of Waddington cited it extensively in his Manuel des peches. Domitian xi contains hagiographies by Bozon on the following women: Saint Lucy, Mary Magdalene, Saint Margaret, Saint Martha, Elizabeth of Hungary, Saint Christina, Juliana of Nicomedia, Saint Agnes, and Saint Agatha.

The poem De bone femme la bounté is now usually ascribed to Bozon, but not definitively; it was previously ascribed to Walter of Bibbesworth.

Modern knowledge of Bozon is due to Paul Meyer, who published an important article on him in Romania in 1884, and subsequently edited and published a number of his texts.
