= Dan Michel of Northgate =

English writer

Dan Michel of Northgate (fl. 1340) was an English writer, the author of the Ayenbite of Inwyt.

Nothing is known of Dan Michael except what can be gathered from his work and from the fact that Northgate is still the name of an area of the city of Canterbury in Kent, England. His only known work is a literal translation in the Kentish dialect of a French treatise entitled La Somme des Vices et des Vertus (also known as Le Miroir du monde or Le Livre des commandemens, &c.), which was written in 1279 by Laurentius Gallus, a Dominican friar and confessor to Philip III of France. This work was translated into Flemish, Catalan, Spanish and Italian, and appears in no less than six English translations.

Dan Michel's autograph manuscript is preserved in the British Library as Arundel MS 57, which states that the work was completed in the year 1340 on the eve of the apostles Simon and Jude by Dan Michel of Northgate, a brother of the cloister of St Augustine of Canterbury. The value of the book is chiefly philological as an authenticated and dated example of the southern dialect. The Ayenbite of Inwyt was edited for the Roxburghe Club by the Rev. Joseph Stevenson in 1855, and for the Early English Text Society by Richard Morris in 1876.
