= John Hardyng =

English chronicler and historian (1378–1465)

John Hardyng (or Harding; 1378–1465) was an English chronicler. He was born in Northern England.

== Biography ==
As a boy Hardyng entered the service of Sir Henry Percy (Hotspur), with whom he was present at the Battle of Shrewsbury (1403). He then passed into the service of Sir Robert Umfraville, under whom he was constable of Warkworth Castle, Northumberland, and Kyme Castle, Lincolnshire. He was in Umfraville's retinue at the Battle of Agincourt in 1415 and in the sea-fight before Harfleur in 1416.

In 1424 Hardyng was at Rome, where at the instance of Cardinal Beaufort he consulted the chronicle of Gnaeus Pompeius Trogus. Upon the death of Umfraville in 1436, Hardyng retired to the Augustinian Priory at Kyme, where he wrote the two versions of his chronicle and where he probably lived until his death about 1465. Hardyng was a man of antiquarian knowledge, and under Henry V was employed to investigate the feudal relations of Scotland to the English crown. For this purpose he visited Scotland. By his own account, he spent three and a half years mapping the terrain and securing documents related to English sovereignty. Later, he would incorporate material from his Scottish mission, most notably the first independent map of Scotland, into a history of Britain written for Henry V's son.

For his services he says that Henry V promised Hardyng the manor of Geddington in Northamptonshire. Many years after, in 1440, he had a grant of £10 a year for similar services. In 1457 there is a record of the delivery of documents relating to Scotland by Hardyng to the earl of Shrewsbury, and his reward by a further pension of £20.

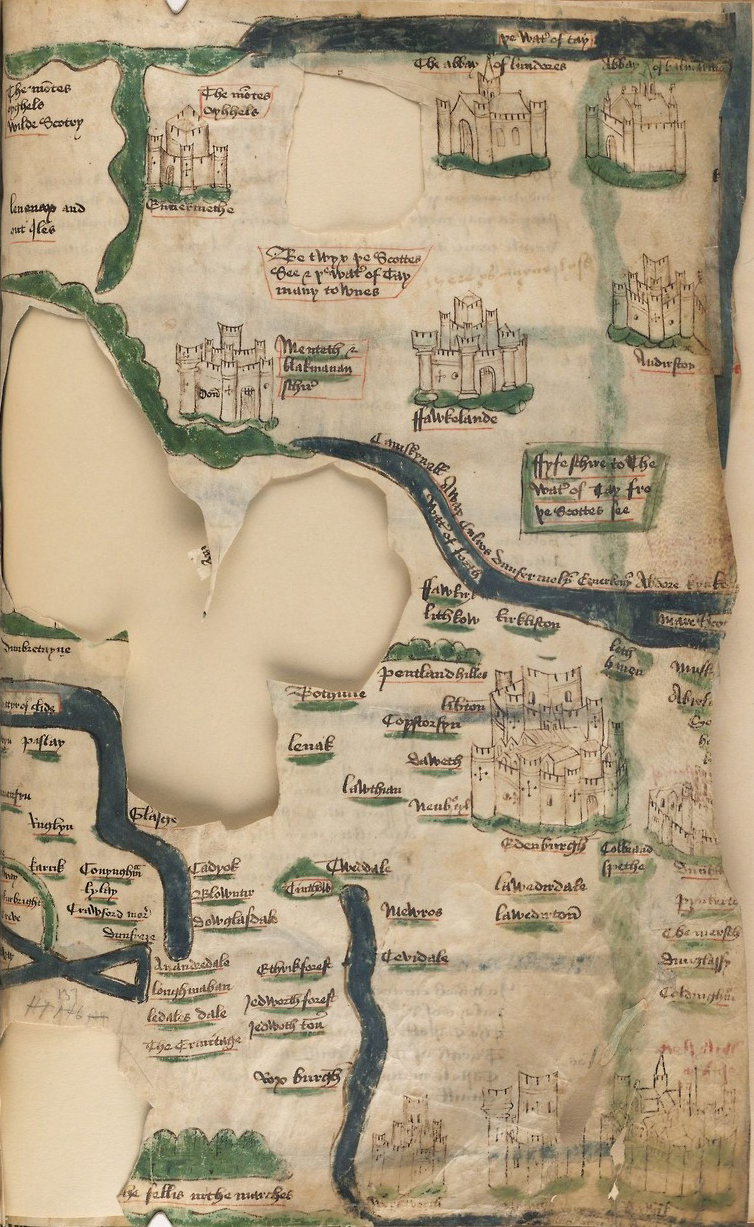
Manuscript map of Scotland by John Hardyng, 15th century

It is clear that Hardyng was well acquainted with Scotland, and James I is said to have offered him a bribe to surrender his papers. But most of the documents, which are still preserved in the Record Office, have been shown to be forgeries, and were probably manufactured by Hardyng himself.

Hardyng spent many years on the composition of a rhyming chronicle of England. His services under the Percies and Umfraville's gave him opportunity to obtain much information of value for fifteenth century history. It was written and rewritten to suit his various patrons. The original edition ending in 1437 had a Lancastrian bias and was dedicated to Henry VI and his family. Afterwards he began preparing a version for Richard, Duke of York, and continued the chronicle for Richard's son, Edward IV. A reference to Edward's wife, Elizabeth Woodville, in the prologue indicates that Hardyng was still working on his second version in 1464.

== Versions ==
The first version is preserved in Lansdowne manuscript 204 in the British Library, and the best of the later versions in Oxford, Bodleian Library, Arch. Selden B. 10. Richard Grafton printed two editions in January 1543 and Stow, who was acquainted with a different version, censured Grafton on this point somewhat unjustly. Sir Henry Ellis published the longer version of Grafton with some additions from the Selden and Harley manuscripts in 1812. Professors Sarah Peverley and James Simpson have edited the first chronicles, and Peverley is editing the second version.
