= Layamon =

English poet

Layamon or Laghamon (UK: /ˈlaɪ.əmən, -mɒn/, US: /ˈleɪ.əmən, ˈlaɪ-/; Middle English: [ˈlaɣamon]) – spelled Laȝamon or Laȝamonn in his time, occasionally written Lawman – was an English poet of the late 12th/early 13th century and author of the Brut, a notable work that was the first to present the legends of Arthur and the Knights of the Round Table in English poetry (the first Arthurian poems were by Frenchman Chrétien de Troyes).

J. R. R. Tolkien valued him as a transmitter of early English legends in a fashion comparable to the role played with respect to Icelandic legend by Snorri Sturluson.

== Life and influence ==
Layamon describes himself in his poem as a priest living at Areley Kings in Worcestershire. His poem had a significant impact on medieval history writing in England and the development of Arthurian literature and subsequently provided inspiration for numerous later writers, including Sir Thomas Malory and Jorge Luis Borges.

== Brut ==
Brut (ca. 1190) is a Middle English poem compiled and recast by Layamon. It is named after Britain's mythical founder, Brutus of Troy. It is contained in the manuscripts Cotton Caligula A.ix, written in the first quarter of the 13th century, and in the Cotton Otho C.xiii, written about fifty years later (though in this edition it is shorter). Both are kept at the British Library.

The Brut is 16,095 lines long and narrates the history of Britain. It is largely based on the Anglo-Norman Roman de Brut by Wace, which is in turn inspired by Geoffrey of Monmouth's Historia Regum Britanniae. It is, however, longer than both and includes an enlarged section on the life and exploits of King Arthur. Among the new material Layamon provided were an account of the birth of Merlin and one of the origins of the Round Table, as well as details of Arthur's departure by ship to Avalon to be healed by the elf-queen.

It is written in a combination of alliterative verse, deriving from Old English, and rhyme, influenced by Wace's Roman de Brut and used in later Middle English poetry.

== Spelling of name ==
Print-era editors and cataloguers have spelled his name in various ways, including "Layamon", "Lazamon", or "Lawman". Brown University suggests that the form "Layamon" is etymologically incorrect; the Fifth International Conference on Laȝamon's Brut at Brown University stated, "BL MS Cotton Caligula A.ix spells it 'Laȝamon' (the third letter is called a "yogh"). BL MS Cotton Otho C.xiii spelled it 'Laweman' and 'Loweman'."

== See also ==
- Alliterative Morte Arthure
- The Fall of Arthur by J.R.R. Tolkien
