= William of Waddington =

Anglo-Norman poet of the thirteenth century

William of Waddington was an Anglo-Norman poet of the thirteenth century, best known as the author of Manuel des pechiez. He may have been a priest at Rydal.

The Manuel des pechiez ("Manual of the Sins") is a didactic poem, written between 1250 and 1270, containing 1200 octosyllabic rhyming lines that combine practical moral education for lay people with elements of confession. It was the source for Robert Mannyng's better-known Handlyng Synne (1303). Waddington in turn interpolates lines from Nicholas Bozon's "Gospel Poem".
