= Mannyng's Chronicle =

English chronicle

Mannyng's Chronicle is a chronicle written in Middle English by Robert Mannyng in about 1338. He came from Bourne in Lincolnshire and though not himself in full orders was connected with the priory at Sempringham and later with Sixhill.

Mannyng began writing his chronicle at the beginning of Edward III's reign in 1327 and probably finished it in 1338, dated at the end of the second part. The chronicle consists of two parts. The first, describing British history up to King Cadwaldre and a translation of Wace’s Roman de Brut, is 15,946 lines long. The second part, describing history from Cadwaldre up to the death of Edward I and a translation of the Anglo-French verse by Peter of Langtoft, is 8358 lines long. The chronicle survives in two manuscripts: The P manuscript and the L manuscript. The former is the most complete, since the latter ends somewhere in the middle of part II.
