= Handlyng Synne =

Handlyng Synne by Robert Manning of Brunne is a Middle English verse devotional work, intended for the use of both learned and unlearned men, dealing with the theory and practice of morality, and illustrating this doctrine with stories drawn from ordinary life. It was begun in the year 1303. It is valued today for its simple and entertaining style, and for the light it throws on English life in the Middle Ages.

== Description ==
Handlyng Synne was adapted and translated from an Anglo-Norman work attributed to William of Waddington, the Manuel de Pechiez. It consists of more than 12,000 lines of verse, arranged in four-stress couplets. It is a discussion of the ten commandments, the seven deadly sins, the seven sacraments, and the elements of confession, illustrated throughout by exempla, or moral anecdotes, thirteen of which do not appear in the Manuel. Handlyng Synne has been described as "a reduction of the world's experience to a comprehensive moral scheme". It trenchantly criticizes the mores of the time, saying of tournaments, for example, that they promote all seven deadly sins and could not exist in a world in which each knight loved his fellow man.

== Manuscripts and editions ==
Handlyng Synne survives in whole or part in nine manuscripts. It was edited for the Early English Text Society by Frederick J. Furnivall (2 vols., 1901, 1903). A more recent edition by Idelle Sullens was published in 1983.

== Influence ==
It is one of the sources of a mid-15th century work called Peter Idley's Instructions to his Son. Michael Malone's 1986 comic novel Handling Sin used Mannyng's title for a widely different treatment of the seven deadly sins.

== Critical reception ==
Handlyng Synne is considered a work of greater literary merit than Mannyng's only other known poem, the Chronicle. Richard Newhauser has drawn attention to the subtlety of its analysis of its subject, "alive to the difficulties of treating sin without becoming mired in sin itself, and aware of the ways in which sins constantly undo the borders between each other or disguise themselves as virtues". But for many critics the most interesting aspect of Handlyng Synne is its collection of exempla. Comparison has been made with John Gower's Confessio Amantis: "The octosyllabic couplets of Handlyng Synne may lack Gower's smoothness, but several of the tales, if cruder, are more vigorous and vivid than most of Gower's". Derek Pearsall called Mannyng "a born story-teller", who "displays plenty of vigour, though his professional role allows little sophistication". Antony Gibbs wrote that "his gusto conveys itself readily to his reader". Kenneth Sisam believed that "in the art of linking good teaching with entertainment he is a master", and called Handlyng Synne "the best picture of English life before Langland and Chaucer".
