= Derek Pearsall =

British medievalist (1931–2021)

Derek Albert Pearsall (1931–2021) was an English medievalist and Chaucerian who wrote and published widely on Chaucer, Langland, Gower, manuscript studies, and medieval history and culture. He was the co-director for the Centre for Medieval Studies at the University of York and was the Gurney Professor of English Literature at Harvard University. In 1998, he delivered the British Academy's Sir Israel Gollancz Memorial Lecture.

== Early and personal life ==
Pearsall was born in Birmingham to parents Elsie (née Rawlins) and Joseph, a shop fitter toolmaker, and attended King Edward VI Camp Hill School for Boys. The first in his family to go to university, Pearsall earned a B.A. in 1951 and an M.A. in 1952 from the University of Birmingham (UK).

In 1952 in King's Lynn, Pearsall married Rosemary Elvidge (d. 2004), whom he had met as a student. They had five children. The couple considered York, where they returned to upon retirement and had a permanent house in Clifton, to be their home.
