= Wace =

12th-century Norman poet and chronicler

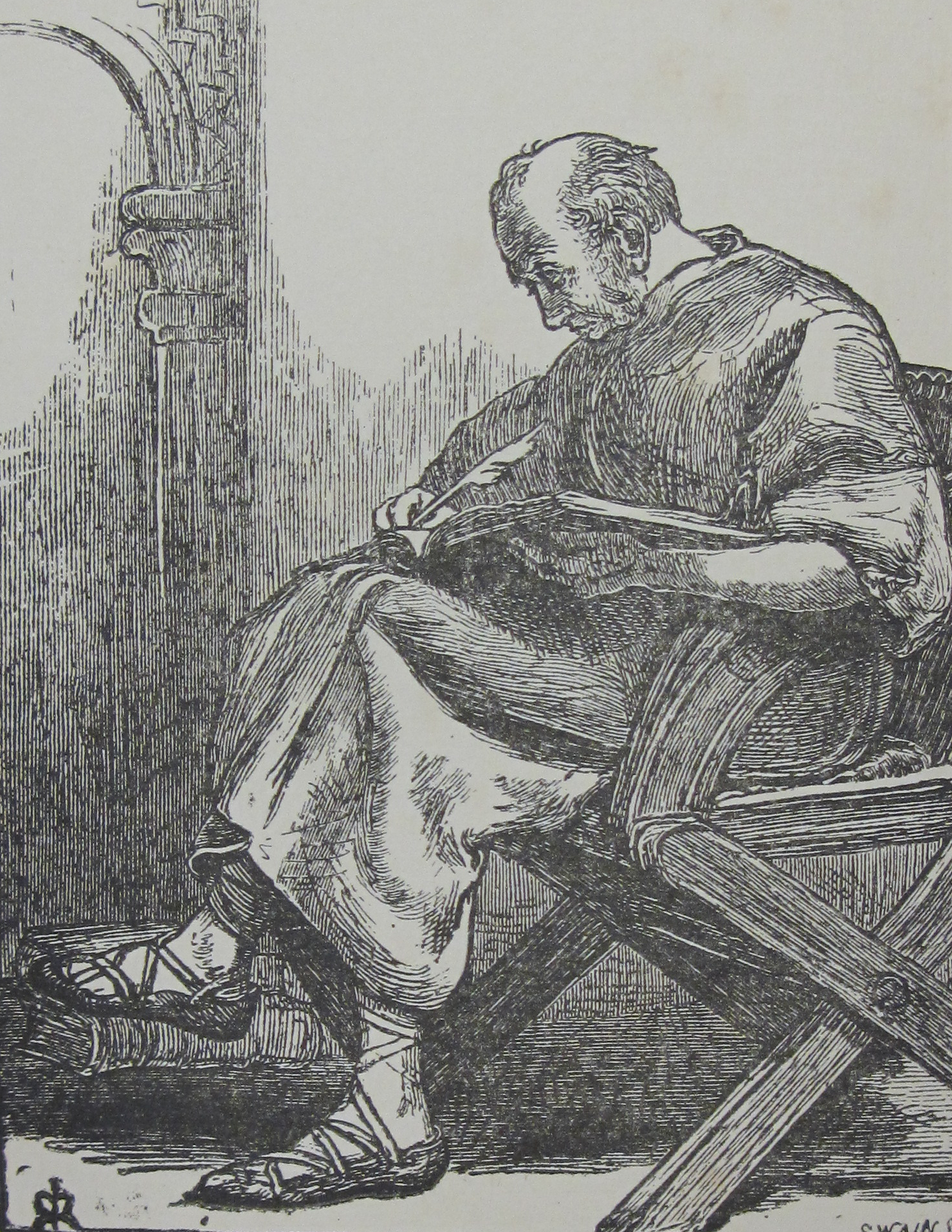
- Wace drawn by John Everett Millais
- Born: c. 1110; Jersey, Duchy of Normandy
- Died: after 1174 (age 64+)
- Education: Educated in Caen
- Writing career
- Language: Old French/Old Norman/Anglo-Norman
- Years active: 1150s–70s
- Period: Anglo-Norman literature

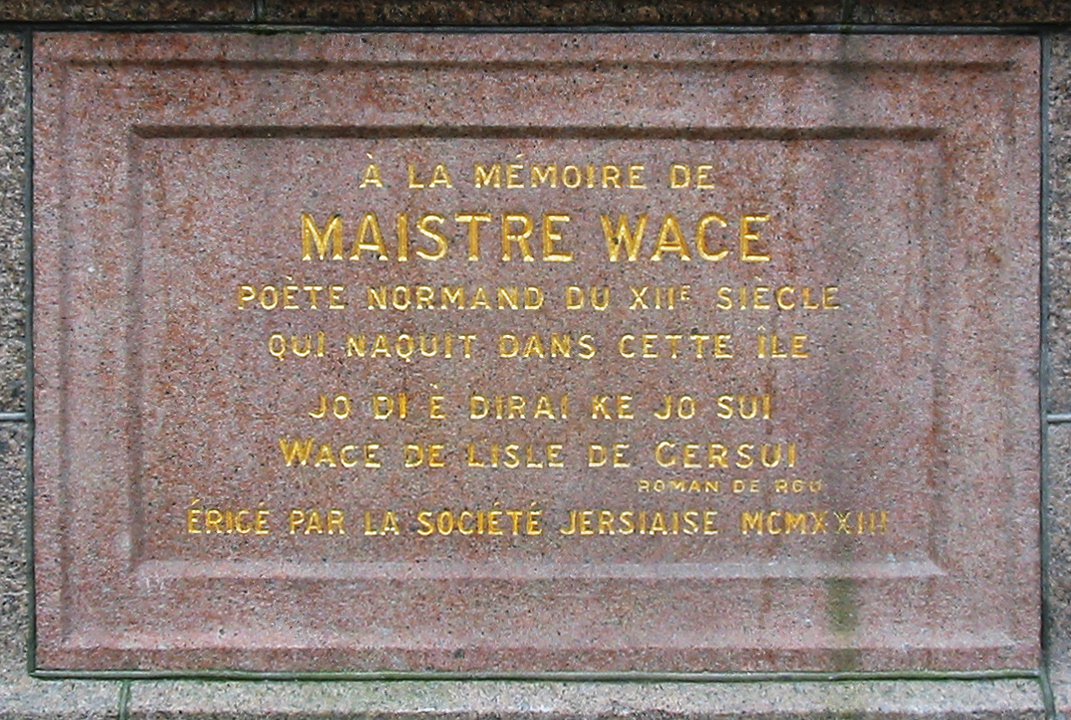
A memorial to Wace was set up in his native island of Jersey

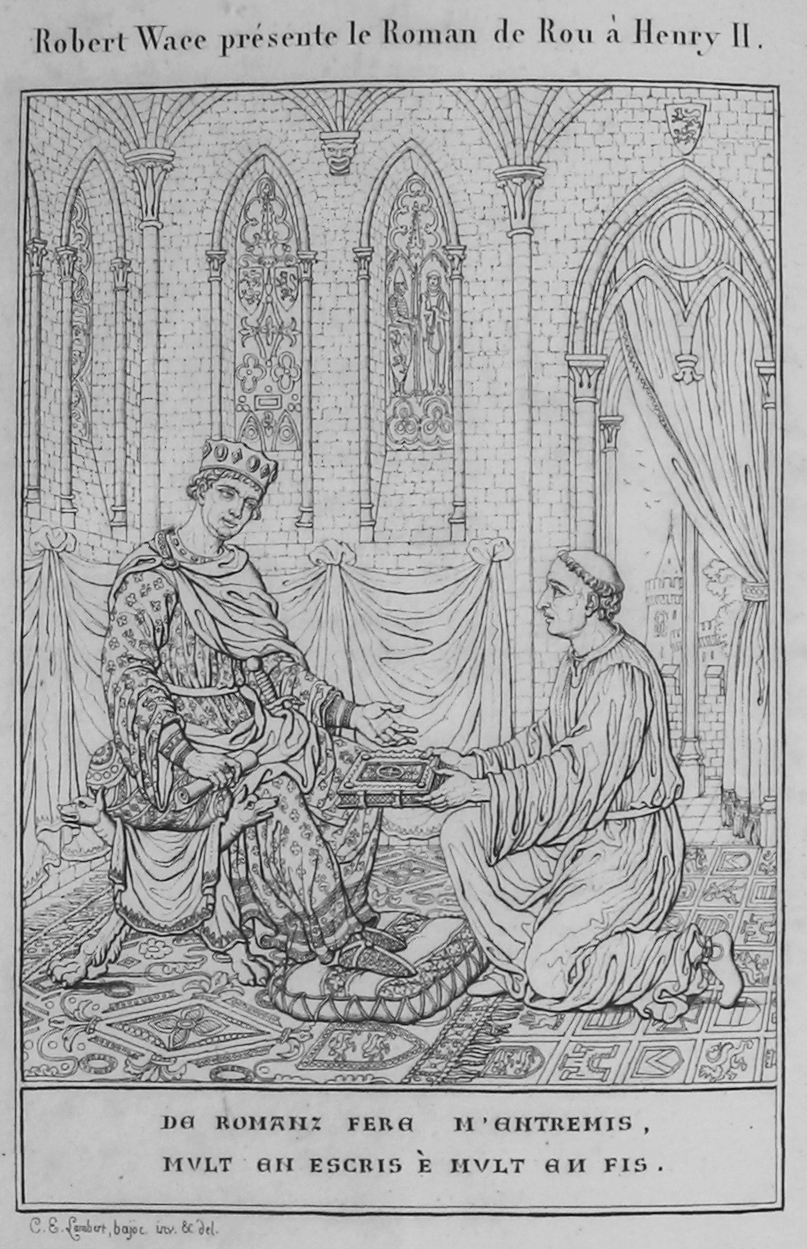
Wace presents his Roman de Rou to Henry II in this illustration from 1824

Wace (c. 1110 – after 1174), sometimes referred to as Robert Wace, was a Medieval Norman poet, who was born in Jersey and brought up in mainland Normandy (he tells us in the Roman de Rou that he was taken as a child to Caen), ending his career as Canon of Bayeux.

== Life ==
All that is known of Wace's life comes from autobiographical references in his poems. He neglected to mention his birthdate; some time between 1099 and 1111 is the most commonly accepted period for his birth.

The name Wace, used in Jersey until the 16th century, appears to have been his only name; surnames were not universally used at that time. It was quite a common first name in the Duchy of Normandy, derived from the Germanic personal name Wasso, Wazzo. The spelling and the pronunciation of this name were rendered different ways in the texts, according to the place where the copyists were from. In the various versions of the Roman de Rou, his name appears five times as Wace, then Gace (once), Vace, Vacce, Vaicce (three times all together). Until the 11th century, the w spelling corresponded to the pronunciation [w] (like in English) in Northern Normandy (including the Channel Islands), but it shifted to [v] in the 12th century. South to an isogloss corresponding more or less to the Joret line, [w] had been turned to [gw] and later [g] (like in common French). Today the name survives as the patronymic surname Vasse in Normandy and in the North of France and Gasse further south (including also Normandy). and a derived form in -elin : Vasselin

His name is pronounced /weɪs/ (rhyming with 'place') or /wæz/ ('waz'). In French it is pronounced [vɑs].

It is speculated that he may have been of aristocratic origin, as he was sent to Caen to be educated, which would have been virtually impossible for most. His detailed writing on maritime matters may have stemmed from his island upbringing.

Around 1130 Wace returned to Caen and took ecclesiastical work, possibly as a teacher.

The date of Wace's death is uncertain. The most recent event described in the Roman de Rou may be dated to 1174. In the Rou, Wace also mentions Henry the Young King as living. The latter lived until 1183, which means that Wace probably did not revise the Rou after that date.

== Works ==
His extant works include the Roman de Brut, a verse history of Britain, the Roman de Rou, and other works in verse, including the Lives of Margaret the Virgin and Saint Nicholas.

=== Roman de Brut ===
Roman de Brut (c. 1155) was based on the Historia Regum Britanniae of Geoffrey of Monmouth. It cannot be regarded as a history in any modern sense, although Wace often distinguishes between what he knows and what he does not know, or has been unable to find out. Wace narrates the founding of Britain by Brutus of Troy to the end of the legendary British history created by Geoffrey of Monmouth. The popularity of this work is explained by the new accessibility to a wider public of the Arthur legend in a vernacular language. In the midst of the Arthurian section of the text, Wace was the first to mention the legend of King Arthur's Round Table, although on the whole he adds only minor details to Geoffrey's text.

The Roman de Brut became the basis, in turn, for Layamon's Brut, an alliterative Middle English poem, and Peter Langtoft's Chronicle. Historian Matthew Bennett, in an article entitled "Wace and warfare," has pointed out that Wace clearly had a good understanding of contemporary warfare, and that the details of military operations he invents to flesh out his accounts of pseudo-historical conflicts can therefore be of value in understanding the generalities of warfare in Wace's own time.

=== Roman de Rou ===
The Roman de Rou, was, according to Wace, commissioned by Henry II of England in around 1160. The Rou is a vernacular adaptation of the chronicle tradition of the dukes of Normandy begun by Dudo of St. Quentin, and continued by William of Jumièges, Orderic Vitalis, and Robert of Torigni. Wace claims that he was fired by Henry II after working on the project for 15 years.

Let he whose business it is continue the story. I am referring to Master Beneeit, who has undertaken to tell of this affair, as the king has assigned him the task; since the king has asked him to do it, I must abandon it and fall silent.

— Wace, Roman de Rou

Henry had indeed replaced Wace with another writer, Benoît de Sainte-Maure, already famous from having written the Roman de Troie. Benoît did not use any of Wace's work, but started afresh in composing his own Chronique des ducs de Normandie. Precisely why Henry II fired Wace and replaced him on the project with Benoît is unknown, although a number of theories have been advanced to explain the decision. Among the sensitive issues that were introduced by Wace, and handled differently by Benoît, was the memory of Robert of Curthose, duke of Normandy, and the role in the First Crusade. In terms of English dynastic history, Curthose could only be a controversial figure, since his son had offered a rival claim to the ducal title. Where Wace offered a fawning description of Robert's heroism, including claims that he had returned with great trophies like the banner of a Muslim emir, Benoît closed his account by emphasizing the shame Robert had brought upon the family by refusing to accept the crown of the kingdom of Jerusalem.

== Language ==
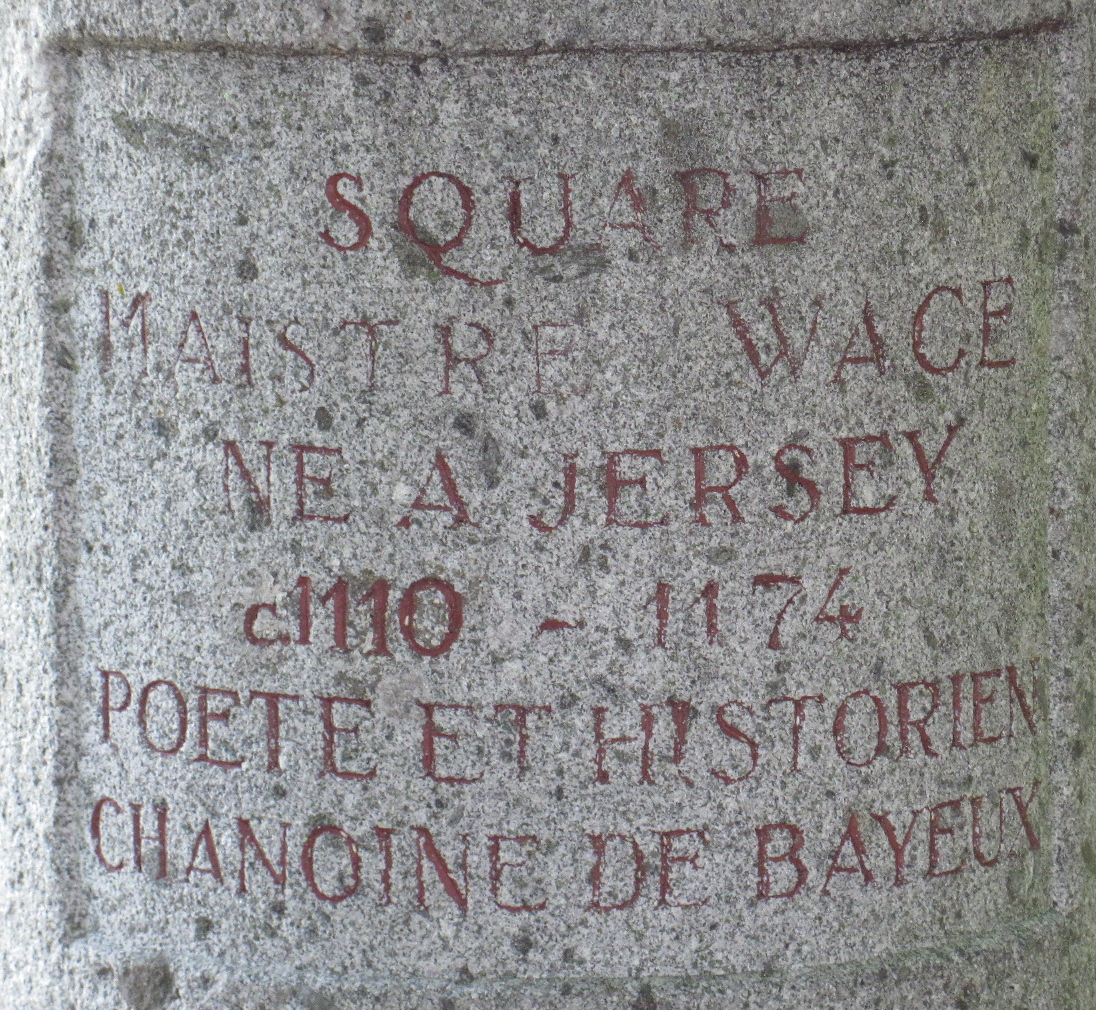
Square in Bayeux named for Wace

The Romance language Wace wrote in is variously regarded as an Old Norman dialect of the Norman language, a dialect of Old French, or specifically the precursor of Jèrriais. Writers in Jersey have looked on Wace as the founder of Jersey literature, and Jèrriais is sometimes referred to as the language of Wace although the poet himself predated the development of Jèrriais as a literary language. Wace is the earliest known Jersey writer.

Although the name Robert has been ascribed to Wace, this is a tradition resting on little evidence. It is generally believed nowadays that Wace only had one name. As a clerc lisant, he was proud of his title of Maistre (master) and is consequently sometimes referred to as Maistre Wace.

There is a granite memorial stone to Wace built into the side of the States Building in Jersey's Royal Square. This includes a quote from the Roman de Rou that expresses the poet's pride in his place of birth:

Jo di e dirai ke jo sui
Wace de l’isle de Gersui

Modern Jèrriais:

J'dis et dithai qu'jé sis
Wace dé l'Île dé Jèrri

Modern French:

Je dis et dirai que je suis
Wace de l'île de Jersey

English:

I say and will say that I am
Wace from the Island of Jersey

== See also ==
- Anglo-Norman literature
