= Anglo-Norman literature =

Anglo-Norman literature (Norman: Littérature anglo-normande) is literature composed in the Anglo-Norman language and developed during the period of 1066–1204, as the Duchy of Normandy and the Kingdom of England were united in the Anglo-Norman realm.

== Introduction ==
The Norman language was introduced to England during the rule of William the Conqueror. Following the Norman Conquest, the Norman language was spoken by England's nobility. Similar to Latin, the Anglo-Norman language (the variety of Norman used in England) was deemed the literary language of England in the 12th century, and it was in use at the court until the 14th century. During the reign of Henry IV, English became the native tongue of the kings of England. The language underwent specific changes which distinguished it from the Old Norman spoken in Normandy, from which specific pronunciation rules are inferred. An Anglo-Norman variety of French continued to exist into the early 15th century, though it was in decline from at least the 1360s when it was deemed insufficiently well-known to be used for pleading in court. Great prestige continued to be enjoyed by the French language, however; in the late 14th century, the author of the Manière de language called French:

...le plus bel et le plus gracious language et plus noble parler, apres latin d'escole, qui soit au monde et de touz genz mieulx prisée et amée que nul autre (quar Dieux le fist si douce et amiable principalement à l'oneur et loenge de luy mesmes. Et pour ce il peut comparer au parler des angels du ciel, pour la grand doulceur et biaultée d'icel),

which means:

...The most beautiful and gracious language, and the noblest speech in the world, after school Latin; better prized and loved by all people over any other (for God made it so sweet and lovable mainly for his honor and praise. And it can thus be compared to the angels' speech in heaven for its great sweetness and beauty).

Anglo-Norman literature flourished from the beginning of the 12th century to the end of the first quarter of the 13th century. This period's end coincides with the French provinces' loss to Philip Augustus. It is more accurately denoted by the appearance of the history of William the Marshal in 1225 (published for the Société de l'histoire de France, by Paul Meyer, three vols., 1891–1901). Its importance was sustained by the protection accorded by Henry II of England to the writers of his day.

"He could speak French and Latin well and is said to have known something of every tongue between the Bay of Biscay and the Jordan. He was probably the most highly educated sovereign of his day, and amid all his busy, active life, he never lost interest in literature and intellectual discussion; his hands were never empty; they always had either a bow or a book".

Wace and Benoît de Sainte-More compiled their histories at his bidding, and it was in his reign that Marie de France composed her poems. An event with which he was closely connected, viz., the murder of Thomas Becket, gave rise to a whole series of writings, some of which are purely Anglo-Norman. In his time appeared the works of Béroul and Thomas of Britain, respectively, and some of the most celebrated of the Anglo-Norman romans d'aventure. These works can be grouped into narrative, didactic, hagiographic, lyric, satiric, and dramatic literature.

== Fiction ==
=== Epic and romance ===
The French epic came over to England at an early date. It is believed that the Chanson de Roland (Song of Roland) was sung at the battle of Hastings, and some Anglo-Norman manuscripts of chansons de geste have survived to this day. The Pélérinage de Charlemagne (Eduard Koschwitz, Altfranzösische Bibliothek, 1883) for instance, is preserved only in an Anglo-Norman manuscript of the British Museum (now lost), although the author was certainly a Parisian. The oldest extant manuscript of the Chanson de Roland is also a manuscript written in England. Amongst the others of less importance is La Chançun de Willame, the MS. of which has (June 1903) been published in facsimile at Chiswick.

Although the diffusion of epic poetry in England did not actually inspire any new chansons de geste, it developed the taste for this class of literature, and the epic style in which the tales of the Romance of Horn, of Bovon de Hampton, of Gui de Warewic, of Waldef, and of Fulk Fitz Warine are treated, is partly due to this circumstance. Although the last of these works is available only in a prose version, it contains unmistakable signs of a previous poetic form; it is a rendering into prose similar to the transformations undergone by many of the chansons de geste.

The inter-influence of French and English literature can be studied in the Breton romances and the romans d'aventure even better than in the epic poetry of the period. The Lay of Orpheus is known only through an English imitation, Sir Orfeo; the Lai du cor was composed by Robert Biket, an Anglo-Norman poet of the 12th century (Wulff, Lund, 1888). The Lais of Marie de France were written in England, and the greater number of the romances composing the matière de Bretagne seem to have passed from England to France through the medium of Anglo-Norman.

The legends of Merlin and Arthur, collected in the Historia Regum Britanniae by Geoffrey of Monmouth (died c. 1154), passed into French literature, bearing the character which the bishop of St Asaph had stamped upon them. Robert de Boron (c. 1215) took the subject of his Merlin (published by G. Paris and J. Ulrich, 1886, 2 vols., Société des anciens textes français) from Geoffrey of Monmouth.

Finally, regarded by many as the most celebrated love-legend of the Middle Ages, the story of Tristan and Iseult, was created into literary works by two authors, Béroul and Thomas, the first of whom is probably, and the second certainly, Anglo-Norman (see Arthurian legend; Holy Grail; Tristan). One Folie Tristan was composed in England in the last years of the 12th century. (For all these questions, see Soc. des Anc. Textes, Ernest Muret's ed. 1903; Joseph Bédier's ed. 1902–1905).

Hugh of Rutland wrote two romans d'aventure: Ipomedon (published by Eugen Kölbing and Koschwitz, Breslau, 1889), which relates the adventures of a knight who married the young duchess of Calabria, niece of King Meleager of Sicily, but was loved by Medea, the king's wife, and Protheselaus (published by Kluckow, Göttingen, 1924), written around 1185, which is the sequel to Ipomedon. It deals with the wars and subsequent reconciliation between Ipomedon's sons, Daunus, the elder, lord of Apulia, and Protesilaus, the younger, lord of Calabria. Protesilaus defeats Daunus, who had expelled him from Calabria. He saves his brother's life, is reinvested with the dukedom of Calabria, and, after the death of Daunus, succeeds Apulia. He subsequently marries Medea, King Meleager's widow, who had helped him seize Apulia, having transferred her affection for Ipomedon to his younger son (cf. Ward, Cat. of Rom., i. 728).

Amadas et Idoine, existing only in a continental version, was also the work of an Anglo-Norman author. Gaston Paris has proved that the original was composed in England in the 12th century (An English Miscellany presented to Dr. Furnivall in Honour of his Seventy-fifth Birthday, Oxford, 1901, 386–394).

The Anglo-Norman poem on the Life of Richard Coeur de Lion is lost, and an English version only has been preserved. About 1250 Eustace of Kent introduced into England the roman d'Alexandre in his Roman de toute chevalerie, many passages of which have been imitated in one of the oldest English poems on Alexander, namely, King Alisaunder (P. Meyer, Alexandre le grand, Paris, 1886, ii. 273, and Weber, Metrical Romances, Edinburgh).

=== Fabliaux and fables ===
In spite of the popularity enjoyed by this class of literature, there are only some half-dozen fabliaux written in England:

- Le chevalier à la corbeille,
- Le chevalier qui faisait parler les muets,
- Le chevalier, sa dame et un clerc,
- Les trois dames,
- La gageure,
- Le prêtre d'Alison,
- La bourgeoise d'Orléans (Bédier, Les Fabliaux, 1895).

One of the most popular medieval collections of fables was that written by Marie de France, which she claimed to have translated from King Alfred. In the Contes moralisés, written by Nicole Bozon shortly before 1320 (Soc. Anc. Textes, 1889), a few fables bear a strong resemblance to those of Marie de France.

== Historiography ==
Of arguably greater importance are the works which constitute Anglo-Norman historiography. The first Anglo-Norman historiographer, Geoffrey Gaimar, wrote his Estoire des Engleis (between 1147 and 1151) for Dame Constance, wife of Ralph FitzGilbert (The Anglo-Norman Metrical Chronicle, Hardy and Martin, i. ii., London, 1888). This history comprised a first part (now lost), which was merely a translation of Geoffrey of Monmouth's Historia Regum Britanniae, preceded by a history of the Trojan War, and a second part which proceeds as far as the death of William Rufus. For this second part, he consulted historical documents, but stopped at the year 1087, when first-hand information was more readily available. Similarly, Wace in his Roman de Rou (ed. Anthony Holden, Paris, 1970–1973), written 1160–1174, stops at the battle of Tinchebray in 1106. His Brut or Geste des Bretons (Le Roux de Lincy, 1836–1838, 2 vols.), written in 1155, is a translation of Geoffrey of Monmouth.

"Wace," says Gaston Paris, speaking of the Roman de Rou, "traduit en les abrégeant des historiens latins que nous possédons; mais çà et là il ajoute soit des contes populaires, par exemple sur Richard 1^{er}, sur Robert 1^{er}, soit des particularités qu'il savait par tradition (sur ce même Robert le magnifique, sur l'expédition de Guillaume, &c.) et qui donnent à son oeuvre un réel intérêt historique. Sa langue est excellente; son style clair, serré, simple, d'ordinaire assez monotone, vous plaît par sa saveur archaïque et quelquefois par une certaine grâce et une certaine malice".

The History of the Dukes of Normandy by Benoît de Sainte-More is based on the work of Wace. It was composed at the request of Henry II in approximately 1170, recording events up to 1135 (ed. by Francisque Michel, 1836–1844, Collection de documents inédits, 3 vols.). Its 43,000 lines are the work of a romancier courtois, who takes pleasure in recounting love-adventures such as those he has described in his romance of Troy, rather than serious historiography. Other works, however, give more trustworthy information. For example, the anonymous poem on Henry II's Conquest of Ireland in 1172 (ed. Francisque Michel, London, 1837), together with the Expugnatio Hibernica of Gerald of Wales, constitutes the chief authority on this subject. The Conquest of Ireland was republished in 1892 by Goddard Henry Orpen, under the title of The Song of Dermot and the Earl (Oxford, Clarendon Press). Similarly, Jourdain Fantosme, who was in the north of England in 1174, wrote an account of the wars between Henry II, his sons, William the Lion of Scotland and Louis VII, in 1173 and 1174 (Chronicle of the reigns of Stephen ... III., ed. by Joseph Stevenson and Fr. Michel, London, 1886, pp. 202–307).

Of more historical value is The History of William the Marshal, Count of Striguil and Pembroke, regent of England from 1216–1219, which was found and subsequently edited by Paul Meyer (Société de l'histoire de France, 3 vols., 1891–1901). It was composed in 1225 or 1226 by a professional poet of talent at the request of William, son of the marshal. It was compiled from the notes of the marshal's squire, John d'Early (d. 1230 or 1231), who shared all the vicissitudes of his master's life and was one of the executors of his will. This work is of great value for the history of the period 1186–1219, as the information furnished by John d'Early is either personal or obtained at first hand. In the part which deals with the period before 1186 there are various mistakes, due to the author's ignorance of contemporary history, but this does not detract significantly from the literary value of the work. The style is concise, the anecdotes are well told, the descriptions short and picturesque; the whole constitutes one of the most living pictures of medieval society.

Other less-valued works are the Chronique of Peter of Langtoft, written between 1311 and 1320, and mainly of interest for the period 1294–1307 (ed. by T. Wright, London, 1866–1868); the Chronique of Nicholas Trevet (1258?–1328?), dedicated to Princess Mary, daughter of Edward I. (Duffus Hardy, Descr. Catal. III., 349-350); the Scala Chronica compiled by Thomas Gray of Heaton († c. 1369), which carries up to the year 1362-1363 (ed. by J. Stevenson, Maitland Club, Edinburgh, 1836); the Black Prince, a poem by the poet Chandos Herald, composed about 1386, and relating the life of the Black Prince from 1346-1376 (re-edited by Francisque Michel, London and Paris, 1883); and, lastly, the different versions of the Brutes, the form and historical importance of which have been indicated by Paul Meyer (Bulletin de la Société des anciens textes français, 1878, pp. 104–145), and by F. W. D. Brie (Geschichte und Quellen der mittelenglischen Prosachronik, The Brute of England or The Chronicles of England, Marburg, 1905).

The Crusade and Death of Richard I is a mid-13th-century prose chronicle by an anonymous author. It tells of the journey of King Richard the Lionheart to the Holy Land on the Third Crusade from 1190 to 1191. The chronicle details the trip through France, Sicily, and Cyprus, as well as the siege and capture of Acre, Richard's capture in Austria on the return trip, and his eventual return to England. Later it describes his campaigns against Philip II of France in Normandy, and his death at Châlus in 1199. It is based on the writings by Roger of Howden, Roger of Wendover and Matthew Paris.

On ancient history is the translation of Eutropius and Dares by Geoffrey of Waterford (13th century), who also wrote the Secret des Secrets, a translation from a work wrongly attributed to Aristotle, which belongs to the next division (Rom. xxiii. 314).

== Didactic literature ==
Didactic literature is the most considerable branch of Anglo-Norman literature: it comprises a large number of works written chiefly with the object of giving both religious and profane instruction to Anglo-Norman lords and ladies. The following list gives the most important productions arranged in chronological order:

- Philippe de Thaun, Comput, c. 1119 (edited by E. Mall, Strassburg, 1873), poem on the calendar;
- Bestiaire, c. 1130 (ed. by E. Walberg, Paris, 1900; cf. G. Paris, Rom. xxxi. 175);
- Lois de Guillaume le Conquérant (redaction between 1150 and 1170, ed. by J. E. Matzke, Paris, 1899);
- Disticha Catonis (Distichs of Cato), translated by Everard de Kirkham and Elie de Winchester (Stengel, Ausg. u. Abhandlungen);
- Le Roman de fortune, a summary of Boethius' De consolatione philosophiae (Consolation of Philosophy), by Simon de Fresne (Hist. lit. xxviii. 408);
- Donnei des Amanz, the conversation of two lovers, overheard and carefully noted by the poet, of a purely didactic character, in which are included three interesting pieces, the first being an episode of the story of Tristram, the second a fable, L'homme et le serpent, the third a tale, L'homme et l'oiseau, which is the basis of the celebrated Lai de l'oiselet (Rom. xxv. 497);
- Livre des Sibiles (1160);
- Enseignements Trebor, by Robert de Ho (=Hoo, Kent, on the left bank of the Medway) [edited by Mary Vance Young, Paris; Picard, 101; cf. G. Paris, Rom. xxxii. 141];
- Lapidaire de Cambridge (Pannier, Les Lapidaires français);
- Frére Angier de Ste. Frideswide, Dialogues, 29 November 1212 (Rom. xii. 145-208, and xxix.; M. K. Pope, Étude sur la langue de Frère Angier, Paris, 1903);
- Li dialoge Grégoire le pape, ed. by Foerster, 1876; Petit Plet, by Chardri, c. 1216 (Koch, Altfr Bibliothek. i., and Mussafia, Z. f. r. P. iii. 591);
- Petite philosophie, c. 1225 (Rom. xv. 356; xxix. 72);
- Histoire de Marie et de Jésus (Rom. xvi. 248–262);
- Poème sur l'Ancien Testament '(Not. et Extr. xxxiv. 1, 210; Soc. Anc. Textes, 1889, 73–74);
- Le Corset and Le Miroir, by Robert de Gretham (Rom. vii. 345; xv. 296);
- Lumière as Lais, by Pierre de Peckham, c. 1250 (Rom. xv. 287); an Anglo-Norman redaction of Image du monde, c. 1250 (Rom. xxi. 481);
- two Anglo-Norman versions of Quatre soeurs (Justice, Truth, Peace, Mercy), 13th century (ed. by Fr. Michel, Psautier d'Oxford, pp. 364–368, Bulletin Soc. Anc. Textes, 1886, 57, Romania, xv. 352);
- another Comput by Raüf de Lenham, 1256 (P. Meyer, Archives des missions, 2nd series iv. 154 and 160-164; Rom. xv. 285);
- Le chastel d'amors, by Robert Grosseteste or Greathead, bishop of Lincoln (died 1253) [ed. by Cooke, Carmina Anglo-Normannica, 1852, Caxton Society];
- Poème sur l'amour de Dieu et sur la haine du péché, 13th century, second part (Rom. xxix. 5);
- Anglo-Norman Sermon, by Thomas of Hales, 13th century;
- Le mariage des neuf filles du diable (Rom. xxix. 54);
- Ditie d' Urbain, attributed without any foundation to Henry I. (P. Meyer, Bulletin Soc. Anc. Textes, 1880, p. 73 and Romania xxxii, 68);
- Dialogue de l'évêque Saint Julien et son disciple (Rom. xxix. 21);
- Poème sur l'antichrist et le jugement dernier, by Henri d'Arci (Rom. xxix. 78; Not. et. Extr. 35, i. 137).
- William of Waddington produced at the end of the 13th century his Manuel des péchés, which was adapted in England by Robert of Brunne in his Handlyng Synne (1303) [Hist. lit. xxviii. 179–207; Rom. xxix. 5, 47-53]; see F. J. Furnivall, Robert of Brunne's Handlyng Synne (Roxb. Club, 1862);

In the 14th century are found:

- Nicole Bozon's Contes moralisés (see above);
- Traité de naturesse (Rom. xiii. 508);
- Sermons in verse (P. Meyer, op. cit. xlv.);
- Proverbes de bon enseignement (op. cit. xlvi.).

Also existing are a few handbooks on the teaching of French. Gautier de Biblesworth wrote such a treatise à Madame Dyonise de Mountechensi pur aprise de langage (T. Wright, A Volume of Vocabularies; P. Meyer, Rec. d'anc. textes, p. 360 and Romania xxxii, 22); Orthographia gallica (J. Stürzinger (editor), Altfranzösische Bibliothek herausgegeben von Dr. Wendelin Foerster. Achter Band. Orthographia Gallica. Ältester Traktat über französische Aussprache und Orthographie. Nach vier Handschriften zum ersten Mal herausgegeben, Heilbronn, 1884, and R.C. Johnston, ANTS. Plain Texts 1987); La manière de language, written in 1396 (P. Meyer, Rev. crit. d'hist. et de litt. vii(2). 378). In 1884, Meyer noted no fewer than fourteen manuscripts containing this treatise; Un petit livre pour enseigner les enfants de leur entreparler comun françois, c. 1399 (Stengel, Z. für n.f. Spr. u. Litt. i. 11).

The important Mirour de l'omme, by John Gower, contains about 30,000 lines written in very good French at the end of the 14th century (Macaulay, The Complete Works of John Gower, i., Oxford, 1899).

== Religious literature ==
=== Bible ===
- Quatre livres des rois, translated into French in the 12th century, and imitated in England soon after (P. Schlösser, Die Lautverhältnisse der quatre livres des rois, Bonn, 1886; Romania, xvii. 124);
- Oxford Psalter, c. 1150 (Fr. Michel, Libri Psalmorum versio antiqua gallica, Oxford, 1860);
- Cambridge Psalter, c. 1160 (Fr. Michel, Le Livre des Psaumes, Paris, 1877);
- London Psalter, same as Oxford Psalter (cf. Beyer, Zt. f. rom. Phil. xi. 513-534; xii. 1-56);
- Anglo-Norman Gospel harmony;
- Revelacion, a versification of the Book of Revelation in 113 episodes with illustrations

=== Apocrypha ===
- Les Enfaunces de Jesu Crist, an Anglo-Norman version of the apocryphal Old French Evangile de l'Enfance
- On the Priesthood of Jesus, a 7th- or 8th-century apocryphon originally written in Greek and put into Latin by Grosseteste, is found in an anonymous Anglo-Norman translation in the manuscript Paris, Bibl. Nat. N. A. français 10176 from c. 1275
- Apocryphal testaments of Reuben and Levi from the Testaments of the Twelve Patriarchs, also based on Grosseteste's Latin translation from Greek and found in Paris, Bibl. Nat. N. A. français 10176

Religious tales dealing mostly with the Marian legends have been handed down in three collections:

1. The Adgar's collection. Most of these were translated from William of Malmesbury (d. 1143?) by Adgar in the 12th century. ("Adgar's Marien-Legenden", Altfr. Biblioth. ix.; J. A. Herbert, Rom. xxxii. 394).
2. The collection of Everard of Gateley, a monk of St. Edmund at Bury, who wrote c. 1250 three Marian legends (Rom. xxix. 27).
3. An anonymous collection of sixty Marian legends composed c. 1250 (Brit. Museum Old Roy. 20 B, xiv.), some of which have been published in Hermann Suchier's Bibliotheca Normannica; in the Altf. Bibl. See also Mussafia, "Studien zu den mittelalterlichen Marien-legenden" in Sitzungsh. der Wien. Akademie (t. cxiii., cxv., cxix., cxxiii., cxxix.).

Another set of religious and moralizing tales is to be found in Chardri's Set dormans about the Seven Sleepers and Josaphat about Barlaam and Josaphat c. 1216 (Koch, Altfr. Bibl., 1880; G. Paris, Poèmes et légendes du moyen âge).

=== Hagiography ===
Among the numerous lives of saints written in Anglo-Norman the most important ones are the following, the list of which is given in chronological order:

- Voyage de Saint Brandan (or Brandain), written in 1121, by an ecclesiastic for Queen Aelis of Louvain (Rom. St. i. 553-588; Z. f. r. P. ii. 438-459; Rom. xviii. 203. C. Wahlund, Die altfr. Prosaübersetz. von Brendan's Meerfahrt, Upsala, 1901);
- life of St. Catherine by Clemence of Barking (Rom. xiii. 400, Jarnik, 1894);
- life of St Giles, c. 1170, by Guillaume de Berneville (Soc. Anc. Textes fr., 1881; Rom. xi. and xxiii. 94);
- life of St. Nicholas, life of Our Lady, by Wace (Delius, 1850; Stengel, Cod. Digby, 66); Uhlemann, Gram. Krit. Studien zu Wace's Conception und Nicolas, 1878;
- life of St. George by Simon de Fresne (Rom. x. 319; J. E. Matzke, Public. of the Mod. Lang. Ass. of Amer. xvii. 1902; Rom. xxxiv. 148);
- Expurgatoire de Ste. Patrice, by Marie de France (Jenkins, 1894; Eckleben, Aelteste Schilderung vom Fegefeuer d.H. Patricius, 1851; Ph. de Felice, 1906);
- La vie de St. Edmund le Rei, by Denis Pyramus, end of the 12th century (Memorials of St. Edmund's Abbey, edited by T. Arnold, ii. 1892; Rom. xxii. 170);
- Henri d'Arci's life of St. Thais, Visio sancti Pauli (P. Meyer, Not. et Extr. xxxv. 137–158);
- life of St. Gregory the Great by Frère Angier, 30 April 1214 (Rom. viii. 509–544; ix. 176; xviii. 201);
- The Vie de seint Clement, early 13C (D. Burrows, Vie de seint Clement, 3 vols., Anglo-Norman Text Society: London, 2007-9/10); a version of the Pseudo-Clementine Recognitiones and Epistula Clementis ad Iacobum translated by Rufinus of Aquileia, and the Passio sanctorum apostolorum Petri et Pauli attributed to Pseudo-Marcellus;
- life of St. Modwenna, between 1225 and 1250 (Suchier, Die dem Matthäus Paris zugeschriebene Vie de St. Auban, 1873, pp. 54–58);
- Fragments of a life of St Thomas Becket, c. 1230 (P. Meyer, Soc. Anc. Text. fr., 1885); and another life of the same by Benoit of St. Alban, 13th century (Michel, Chron. des ducs de Normandie; Hist. Lit. xxiii. 383);
- a life of Edward the Confessor, written before 1245 (H. R. Luard, Lives of Edward the Confessor, 1858; Hist. Lit. xxvii. 1), by an anonymous monk of Westminster; life of St. Auban, c. 1250 (Suchier, op. cit.; Uhlemann, "Über die vie de St. Auban in Bezug auf Quelle," &c. Rom. St. iv. 543-626; ed. by Atkinson, 1876).
- The Vision of Tnudgal, an Anglo-Norman fragment, is preserved in MS. 312, Trinity College, Dublin; the MS. is of the 14th century; the author seems to belong to the 13th (La vision de Tondale, ed. by Friedel and Kuno Meyer, 1906).

To this category can be added the life of Hugh of Lincoln, 13th century (Hist. Lit. xxiii. 436; Child, The English and Scottish Popular Ballads, 1888, p. v; Wolter, Bibl. Anglo-Norm., ii. 115). Other lives of saints were recognized to be Anglo-Norman by Paul Meyer when examining the MSS. of the Welbeck library (Rom. xxxii. 637 and Hist. Lit. xxxiii. 338-378).

== Lyric poetry ==
The only extant songs of importance are the seventy-one Ballads of Gower (Stengel, Gower's Minnesang, 1886). The remaining are mostly of a religious character. Most of these songs have been discovered and published by Paul Meyer (Bulletin de la Soc. Anc. Textes, 1889; Not. et Extr. xxxiv; Rom. xiii. 518, t. xiv. 370; xv. p. 254, &c.). Although they were numerous at one time, few have survived, owing to the constant intercourse between English, French and Provençals of all classes. An interesting passage in Piers Plowman furnishes us with a proof of the extent to which these songs penetrated into England, which writes of:

... dykers and deluers that doth here dedes ille,
And dryuen forth the longe day with 'Deu, vous saue,'
Dame Emme! (Prologue, 223 f.)

One of the finest productions of Anglo-Norman lyric poetry written in the end of the 13th century is the Plainte d'amour (Vising, Göteborg, 1905; Romania xiii. 507, xv. 292 and xxix. 4). There are various other works of a lyrical character written in two languages: Latin and French; or English and French; or even in three languages, Latin, English and French. In Early English Lyrics (Oxford, 1907) there is a poem in which a lover sends to his mistress a love-greeting composed in three languages, and his learned friend replies in the same style (De amico ad amicam, Responcio, viii and ix).

== Satire ==
The popularity enjoyed by the Roman de Renart and the Anglo-Norman version of the Riote du Monde (Z. f. rom. Phil. viii. 275-289) in England is proof enough that the French spirit of satire was keenly appreciated. The clergy and women presented the most attractive target for the shots of the satirists. However, an Englishman raised his voice in favour of the ladies in a poem entitled La Bonté des dames (Meyer, Rom. xv. 315-339), and Nicole Bozon, after having represented "Pride" as a feminine being whom he supposes to be the daughter of Lucifer, and after having fiercely attacked the women of his day in the Char d'Orgueil (Rom. xiii. 516), also composed a Bounté des femmes (P. Meyer, op. cit. 33) in which he covers them with praise, commending their courtesy, their humility, their openness and the care with which they bring up their children. A few pieces of political satire show French and English exchanging amenities on their mutual shortcomings. The Roman des Français, by André de Coutances, was written on the continent, and cannot be quoted as Anglo-Norman although it was composed before 1204 (cf. Gaston Paris: Trois versions rimées de l'évangile de Nicodème, Soc. Anc. Textes, 1885), and is a spirited reply to French authors who had attacked the English.

== Drama ==
This must have had a considerable influence on the development of the mystery play in England, but none of the French plays acted in England in the 12th and 13th centuries have been preserved. Adam, generally considered to be an Anglo-Norman mystery of the 12th century, was most probably written in France at the beginning of the 13th century (Romania xxxii. 637), and the so-called Anglo-Norman Resurrection belongs to continental French as well. The earliest English morality plays seem to have been imitations of the French ones.

== See also ==
- List of Norman-language writers
- Anglo-Norman Text Society
- Medieval French literature
