= Francisque Xavier Michel =

French philologist (1809–1887)

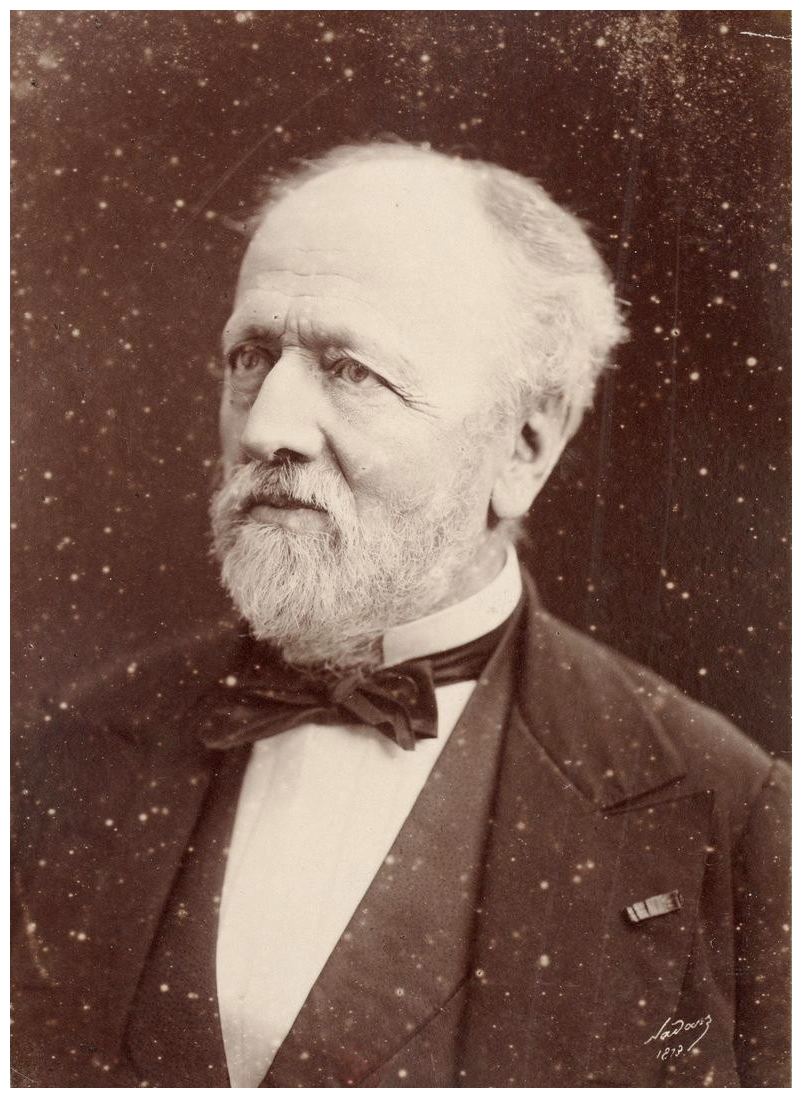
Francisque Xavier Michel

Francisque Xavier Michel (18 February 1809, Lyon – 18 May 1887, Paris) was a French historian and philologist.

== Life ==
He became known for his editions of French works of the Middle Ages, and the French Government, recognizing their value, sent him to England (1833) and Scotland (1837) to continue his research there. In 1837 he became a member of the Comité Historique and in 1838 chevalier de la Légion d'Honneur. In 1839 he was appointed professor of foreign literature in the Faculté des lettres at the University of Bordeaux. Between 1834 and 1842 he published editions of many works written between the eleventh and fourteenth centuries in French, English, and Saxon, including the Roman de la rose and the Chanson de Roland. He got his licence in literature in 1842, and his doctorat in 1846, with a thesis in Latin on Virgil and a thesis in French, entitled: Histoire des races maudites de la France et de l'Espagne, which looked at the history of ostracisation against the Romani and Cagots. Subsequently, he published French translations of Goldsmith, Sterne, Shakespeare, and Tennyson. In 1857 he published his important book on the Basque Country: Le Pays Basque, sa population, sa langue, ses moeurs, sa littérature et sa musique.

== Publications ==
- Quae vices quaeque mutationes et Virgilium ipsum et ejus carmina per mediam aetatem exceperint. (thesis, 1846).
- Histoire des races maudites de la France et de l'Espagne (thesis, 1847)
- Recherches sur le commerce pendant le moyen âge (1852–1854)
- Les Ecossais en France et les français en Ecosse (1862)
- Etudes de philologie comparée sur l'argot (1856)
- Le Pays basque (1857)
- Le Romancero du Pays Basque (1859)
- Histoire du commerce et de la navigation a Bordeaux (1867–1871)
- in conjunction with Édouard Fournier, Histoire des hôtelleries, cabarets, hotels garnis (1851–1854)

== Edited texts ==
Michel was one of the most prolific editors of medieval French texts. His Libri Psalmorum versio antiqua gallica lists 50 of his works, both editions of Medieval texts and original works. The following is a selected bibliography.

- Tristan; recueil de ce qui reste des poëmes relatifs à ses aventures, 1835. Edition of several poems on the subject of Tristan
- Charlemagne an Anglo-Norman Poem of the twelfth Century, 1836
- Chronique des ducs de Normandie par Benoît, trouvère anglo-normand du XII^{e} siècle, 1836-44. Three volumes, 44,544 verses in total
- La Chanson de Roland, 1837
- La Chanson des Saxons par Jean Bodel, 1839. Two volumes
- Jordan Fantosme, Chronicle of the War between the English and the Scots in 1173 and 1174, 1840
- Gérard de Rossillon, 1856
- Libri Psalmorum versio antiqua gallica (The Oxford Psalter), 1860. Includes variants from the Winchester Psalter and the Corbie Psalter
- Le Roman de la Rose, 1864. Two volumes
- Le Livre des psaumes (The Eadwine Psalter), 1876
- Les voyages merveilleux de saint Brandan, 1878
- Rôles Gascons Transcrits et Publiés [Gascon Rolls, Transcribed and Published] (in French), vol. I: 1242–1254, Paris: National Printing Office, 1885.

== Sources ==
- William Cole. First and Otherwise Notable Editions of Medieval French Texts Printed from 1742 to 1874: A Bibliographical Catalogue of My Collection. Sitges: Cole & Contreras, 2005.
