= Robert Ho =

Robert Ho may refer to:

- Robert Hotung, Hong Kong businessman and philanthropist
- Robert Ho (sailor), Singaporean sailor
- Robert Hung-Ngai Ho, philanthropist and journalist

== See also ==
- Robert de Ho, twelfth century writer of Anglo-Norman literature
