= Massacre at Ayyadieh =

Killing of Muslim prisoners by Christian forces during the Third Crusade

- Part of the Third Crusade
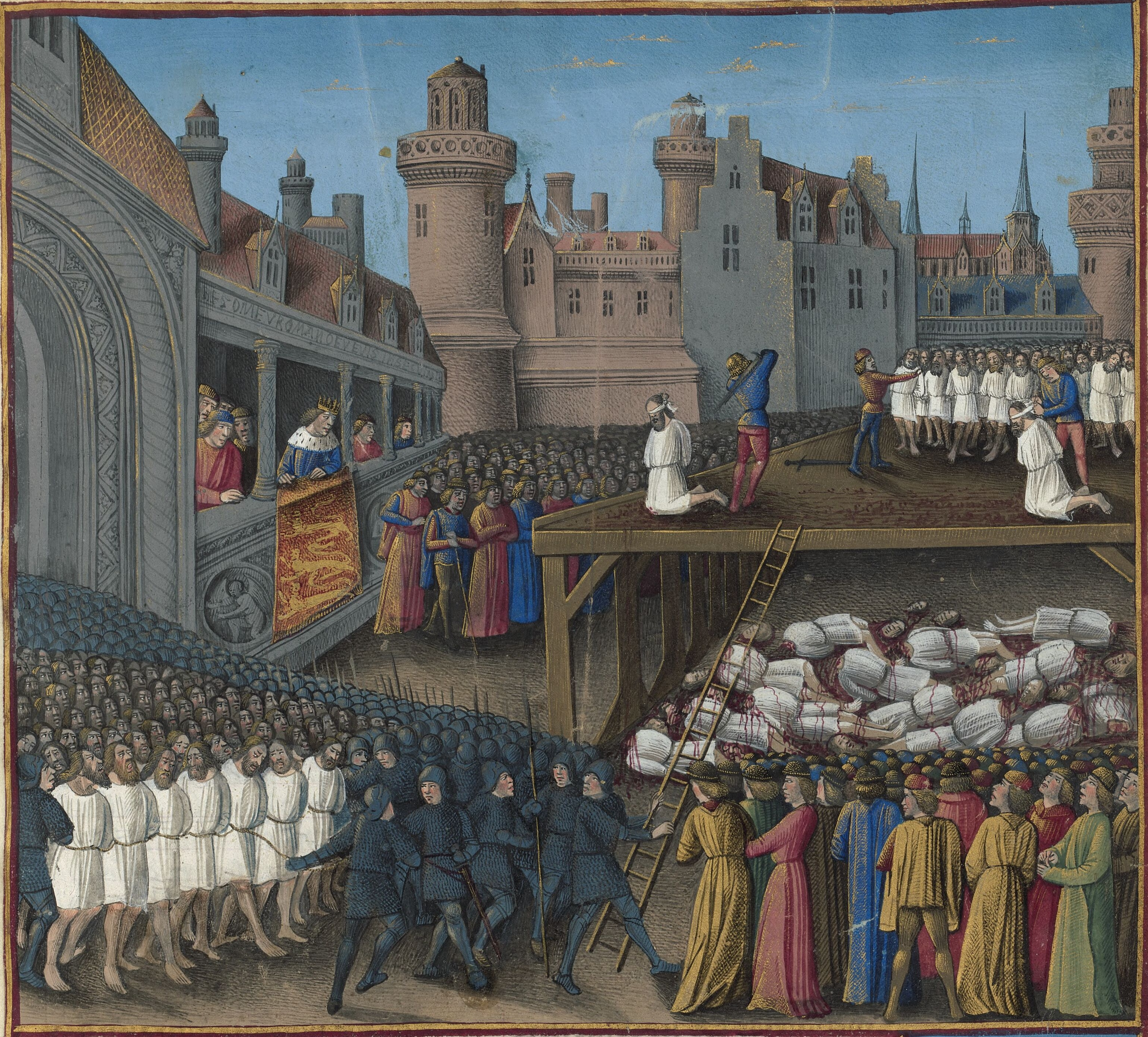
- Massacre of the Saracen prisoners, ordered by King Richard the Lionheart (Jean Colombe).
- Date: 20 August 1191
- Target: Prisoners of war from Saladin's army
- Attack type: Massacre
- Deaths: c. 2,700 to 3,000 Ayyubid prisoners
- Perpetrator: King Richard I's army

The Massacre of Ayyadieh occurred during the Third Crusade after the fall of Acre when King Richard I had more than two thousand Muslim prisoners of war from the captured city beheaded in front of the Ayyubid armies of sultan Saladin on 20 August 1191, sparing only those deemed fit for slave-labor along with a few notables. Despite attacks by Muslim forces during the killings, the Christian Crusaders were able to retire in good order.

Saladin subsequently ordered various Crusader prisoners of war in Damascus to be executed in retaliation.

== Contemporary sources ==
The most important sources written during or shortly after the events are:

- The al-Nawādir al-Sultaniyya wa'l-Maḥāsin al-Yūsufiyya ("Anecdotes of the Sultan and Virtues of Yusuf", in 2001 translated by D. S. Richards as The Rare and Excellent History of Saladin), an Arabic biography of Saladin written by the chronicler Baha ad-Din ibn Shaddad, who served in Saladin's camp and was an eyewitness
- The Itinerarium Peregrinorum et Gesta Regis Ricardi ("Account of the Crusade and the Deeds of King Richard"), a Latin book written in the early 1220s by the English canon Richard de Templo, who may or may not have participated in the Third Crusade himself
- The Crusade and Death of Richard I, a mid-13th-century Anglo-Norman anonymous chronicle based on the earlier writings of Roger of Howden, Roger of Wendover and Matthew Paris. (The original text had no title; the title 'The Crusade and Death of Richard I' was assigned to it by British historian Ronald Carlyle Johnston in 1961 when he translated it to modern English)
- Sébastien Mamerot mentions the massacre briefly at the beginning of Chapter LXVI of his chronicle of the crusades, Passages d'outremer, with the number of deaths being estimated at 5,000 souls. There is no mention of non-combatants.

== Massacre ==
After the fall of Acre, Richard I wanted to exchange a large number of Muslim prisoners from the city for the True Cross, 100,000 gold pieces and 1,600 Christian prisoners of war held captive by Saladin. A deal was struck and a deadline set for Saladin to fulfill his part of the deal.

Distrust between the two leaders developed and a breakdown of negotiations ensued, each side demanding that their opponent's hostages be released first. After the agreed time limit for the Muslims to hand over the cross had expired, Richard, increasingly under the impression that Saladin was stalling, decided to have his hostages publicly executed. On 16 August Richard ordered that all the prisoners from Acre should be taken to a small hill called Ayyadieh. He ordered 2700 Turkish hostages to be led bound out of the city to be beheaded.

The massacre was controversial for contemporary Christian sources. The Itinerarium Peregrinorum estimated that 2700 Turkish (Note: 'Turk', 'Saracen' and 'Moor' are obsolete generalised terms for 'Muslim' used by medieval European Christians. Similarly, medieval Middle Eastern Muslims frequently used the pars pro toto 'Frank' to refer to any Christian or crusader, whether they were from France or not.) hostages were killed, but do not mention any non-combatants that were present. Christian sources at the time take care to mention the strategic burden of the hostages as well as the transgressions of Saladin before the massacre was ordered. Baha ad-Din indicates that even many of the crusaders disapproved of Richard's actions and couldn't understand why Richard ordered the executions.

Parts of the Ayyubid army became so enraged by the killings that they attempted to charge the Crusader lines but were repeatedly beaten back, allowing Richard I and his forces to retire in good order.

== Aftermath ==
All throughout the night, the Muslims were heard wailing over the headless corpses of the massacred captives. Any hope of regaining the True Cross disappeared after Ayyadieh; it was rumored that Saladin sent it to Damascus. On his orders, Christian prisoners in Damascus were executed in retaliation. According to American historian John J. Robinson; "As news of the slaughter spread throughout Saladin's empire, Christian prisoners everywhere were tortured and murdered in reprisal for their infamy." In A History of the Crusades. Volume III, English historian Steven Runciman noted that between 22 and 30 August, as Richard's army marched from Acre past Haifa to Jaffa, Saracen light horsemen carried out various assaults on the crusaders and took several prisoners; "who were taken to Saladin, cross-questioned and then slain, in vengeance for the massacre at Acre. Only the washerwomen were spared."

Studying Saladin's overall attitude towards prisoners of war, Gervers and Powell stated that; "in spite of his reputation for magnanimity, Saladin's treatment of prisoners of war was quite callous." They noted that Saladin was generous towards conquered populations and captured crusader commanders as long as he was achieving victories, but when he did not, or even suffered defeats; "Saladin's behavior toward prisoners was savage, and they were quite systematically put to death." Although scholars of Islamic law justified execution of prisoners under certain conditions, contemporary Islamic historians are divided on the moral acceptability of Saladin's killing of captives. During earlier campaigns in 1177–1179, Saladin had various captured Crusader soldiers and Christian civilians executed at different instances. When he conquered Jerusalem in 1187, however, Saladin released most Christian prisoners for ransoms, although 15,000 of those who could not pay the ransom were sold into slavery. After the 1191 loss of Acre and the Ayyadieh massacre, Saladin was supposedly frustrated by his military setbacks and also desired vengeance, leading to a spike in prisoner executions.

== Bibliography ==
- Payne, Robert (1994). "The Rages of King Richard". The Dream and the Tomb: A History of the Crusades. Rowman & Littlefield. p. 239. ISBN 9780812829457.
