= Medieval garden =

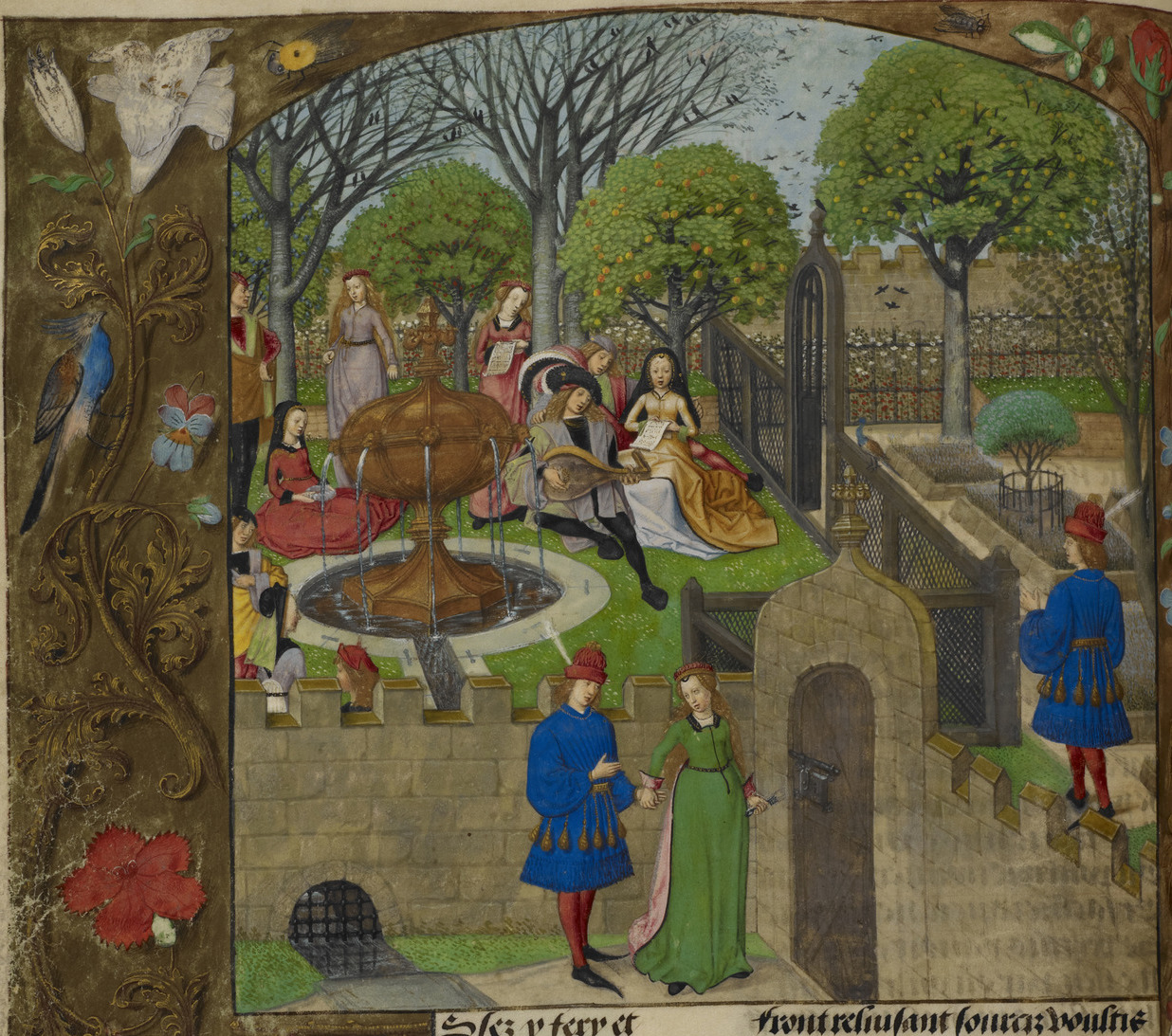
The Lover and Dame Oyseuse outside a walled garden, from a British Library manuscript of the Roman de la Rose, c.1490-1500

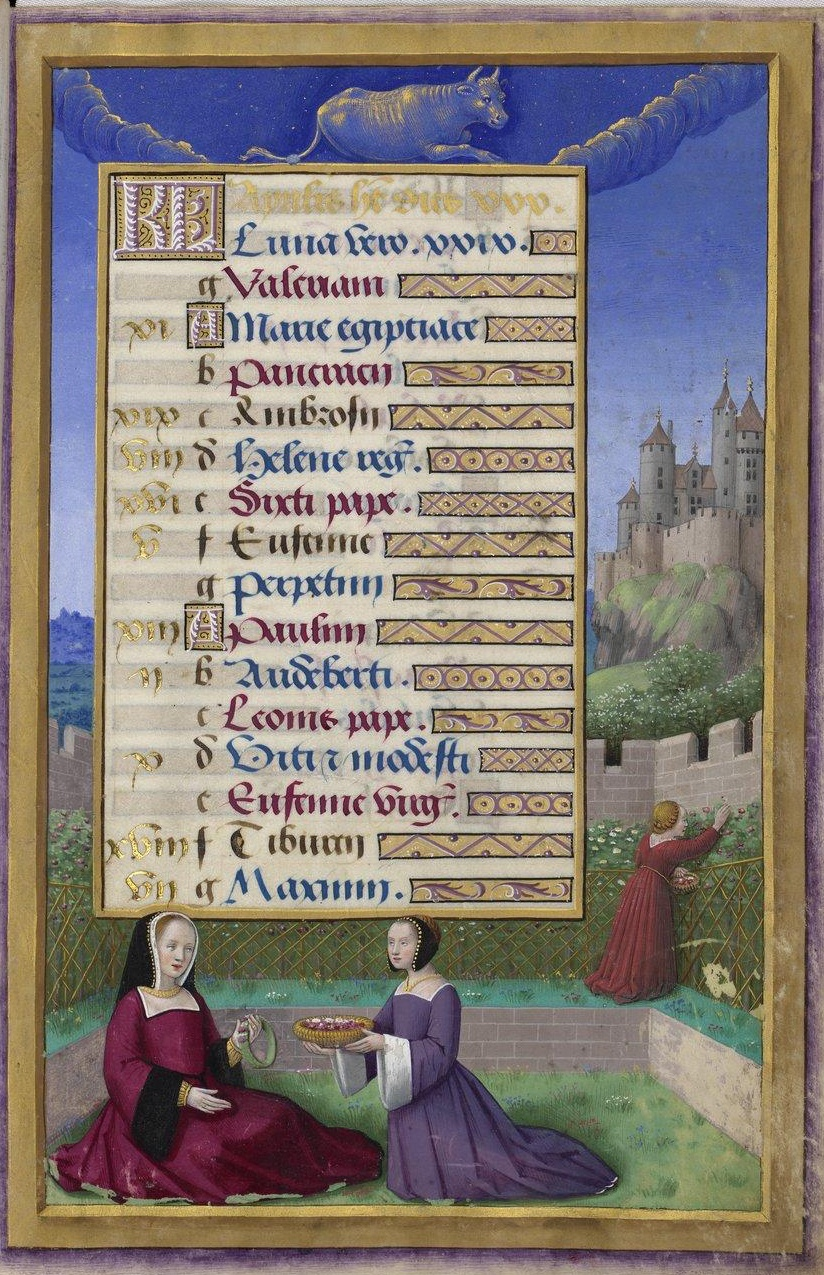
April, from the calendar of the Grandes Heures d'Anne de Bretagne, Queen of France, c.1508

Medieval gardens in Europe were widespread, but our very incomplete knowledge of them is better for those of elites than the common people, who probably mostly grew for food and medicine. The range of ornamental plants available was far narrower than in later periods. The term ‘garden’ refers to the ‘garth’, or enclosure, required around areas valued for their contents or their privacy. Every early garden manual starts with advice on how to form its defence, either by water, hedge or wall; elites wanted to have walled gardens. The skills required by gardeners, who tended to be better paid than other manual workers, included those of vineyard attendants, fruiterers, herb gardeners or makers of arbours.

The cultures which settled in the Roman Empire north of the Alps in the Age of Migrations appear to have had little tradition of gardening, but there was probably some continuity with sophisticated Roman gardening south of the Alps and in Romanized populations, such as the Gallo-Roman areas in southern France. In this context monastic gardens were important, especially in the Early Middle Ages, but are not covered here.

The gardens of the Middle Ages treated below also exclude the Islamic garden traditions of the Umayyad Caliphate, which by 714 had conquered all of the Iberian Peninsula except the northern coast, and the ensuing Caliphate of Cordoba. Cordoba itself was prominent in the Islamic Golden Age, and Christian Europe owed much in science, medicine and botany to exchanges in times of peace. Muslim rule in Spain was not fully extinguished until 1492. Sicily too fell under Arab control until the Norman County of Sicily was established in 1071.

The Christian world included most of the territory of Europe, with its many languages and cultures, and yet the authority of the Pope, the multinational organisation of the religious houses and the dynastic links between the many ruling houses bound it together, despite the frequent squabbles, so that the culture of gardens was a largely shared tradition over the period. There have been numerous attempts over the last century to recreate them, but "no medieval garden survives in anything remotely like original form". Naturally the climatic differences between northern parts of Europe and Mediterranean areas dictated many differences, but from the 10th century until about 1300 at least, Europe enjoyed the Medieval Warm Period, which helped with some tender plants in northern areas.

== Forms of evidence ==
Knowledge of medieval gardens is hampered by the rarity of physical and archaeological remains, although there are archaeological studies about them; also by the paucity of reliable visual evidence. That which exists is principally from miniatures in illuminated manuscripts, few earlier than the fifteenth century. Most were intended to illustrate the section for the calendar of saints in luxury psalters and books of hours, which often gave a page to each month, illustrated opposite with miniatures showing the Labours of the Months, mostly the farming activities which dominated the medieval economy, but sometimes also gardening. These were fanciful in nature, though sometimes with incidental realism. The quantity and level of detail shown in gardening-related miniatures, especially from Flanders, increased sharply from about 1475 until the tradition finally expired around the 1530s. This is beyond the usual definition of the Middle Ages, but new Renaissance ideas and plants had barely reached the northern centres of illumination by then.

Images of the Virgin Mary in her hortus conclusus ("enclosed garden") and the "garden of love", a popular subject in 15th-century engravings by Master E. S. (d. c. 1468) and others, are explicitly set in gardens. The Annunciation increasingly comes to be set in or beside a garden, often with Mary in a loggia and the Archangel Gabriel in the garden outside. Other biblical subjects often given a garden setting are Susanna and the Elders, and Bathsheba in her bath.

The monastic and palatial records of European early medieval gardens suggest that they were mainly intended for growing culinary or medicinal herbs. The concept of the garden of pleasure barely existed until the High Middle Ages, and when it did, they were intended to provide rest and pleasure to the senses. By the early Renaissance period, the emphasis switched from relaxation to display. Sophisticated garden-making was already underway in the Italian Renaissance garden and the Gardens of the French Renaissance especially at the transition from the Late Middle Ages to the Renaissance. In England, the new Tudor dynasty after 1485 brought a style influenced by Burgundy and France, but that soon developed distinctive elements in its knot gardens and carved heraldic beasts on poles. Until about 1540 this style was restricted to royal gardens and those of a small court circle.

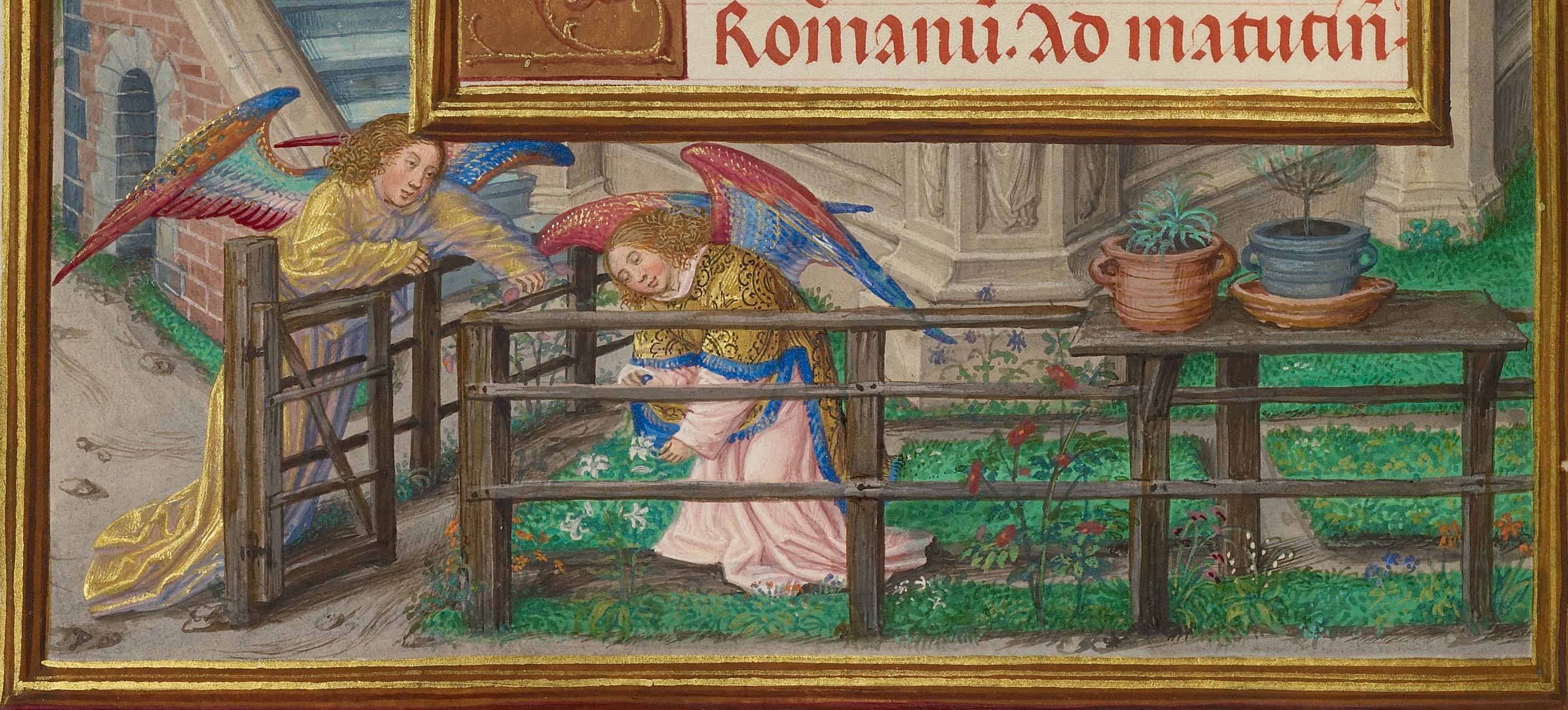
Gardening angels, bas-de-page from the Spinola Hours, Flemish, about 1510

Meanwhile, lower down the social scale, English county quarter sessions would record a purchase of freehold land from the twelfth century via a fine of lands, and gardens were listed alongside messuages, and arable and woodland acreage, confirming that gardens were not just for high-status establishments but were increasingly normal accompaniments to those of rector, squire and farmer, contributing to the medieval diet. One study suggests that almost every cottage would have had a garden, however small, but most garden produce was for consumption rather than sale, which is why gardens appear infrequently in account books.

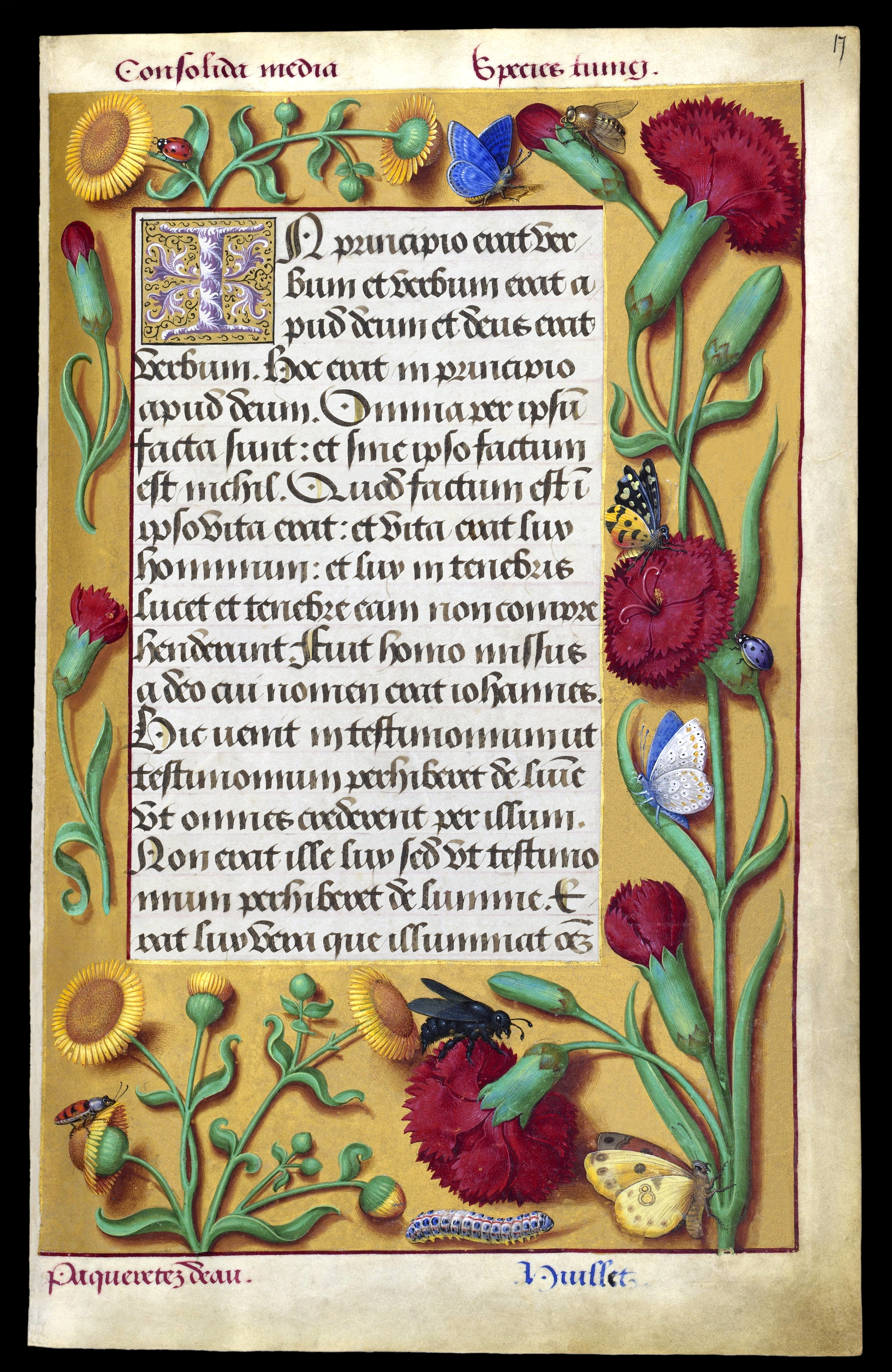
Border of a page from the Grandes Heures d'Anne de Bretagne, c. 1508

Some of the more popular medieval poems were also produced in illustrated form, and when printed books commenced they sometimes included printed illustrations. These are no more help in visualising medieval gardens, for similar reasons to the religious images, as the poetry was generally allegorical romance with visions of earthly paradise and promoted the code of chivalric honour, including courtly love.

The most famous and enduring poem with many passages set in gardens is the Roman de la Rose, composed around 1240 in France by Guillaume de Lorris and continued by Jean de Meun a generation later. Another thirteenth-century French poem, the Lai de l'Oiselet, was retold by John Lydgate as The Churle and the Bird. Rather later English poets included John Skelton who composed The Garlande of Laurell about 1495, first printed in 1523, and the Groom of the Chamber Stephen Hawes whose The Pastime of Pleasure (completed 1506) includes a description of a garden probably, insofar as it relates to reality, based on that at Richmond Palace.

These images and poetics may be of only limited help in visualising medieval gardens, but the miniatures illustrate their construction and floristic content, while the poems provide English terms for them, bypassing the Latinised versions found in earlier accounts. In the 15th century, images of plants on the borders of illuminated manuscripts became increasingly careful and accurate, culminating in the over-200 plants shown in the very lavish Grandes Heures d'Anne de Bretagne of around 1508, many of which are labelled, and include the first record in Europe of some species, including American ones. One of the last great illuminated manuscripts, this also marks the coming to an end of an era in terms of the restricted choice of plants available to gardeners. According to Penelope Hobhouse, in the century after the 1540s "twenty times as many [new species of] plants entered Europe as in the preceding two thousand".

== Castle gardens ==
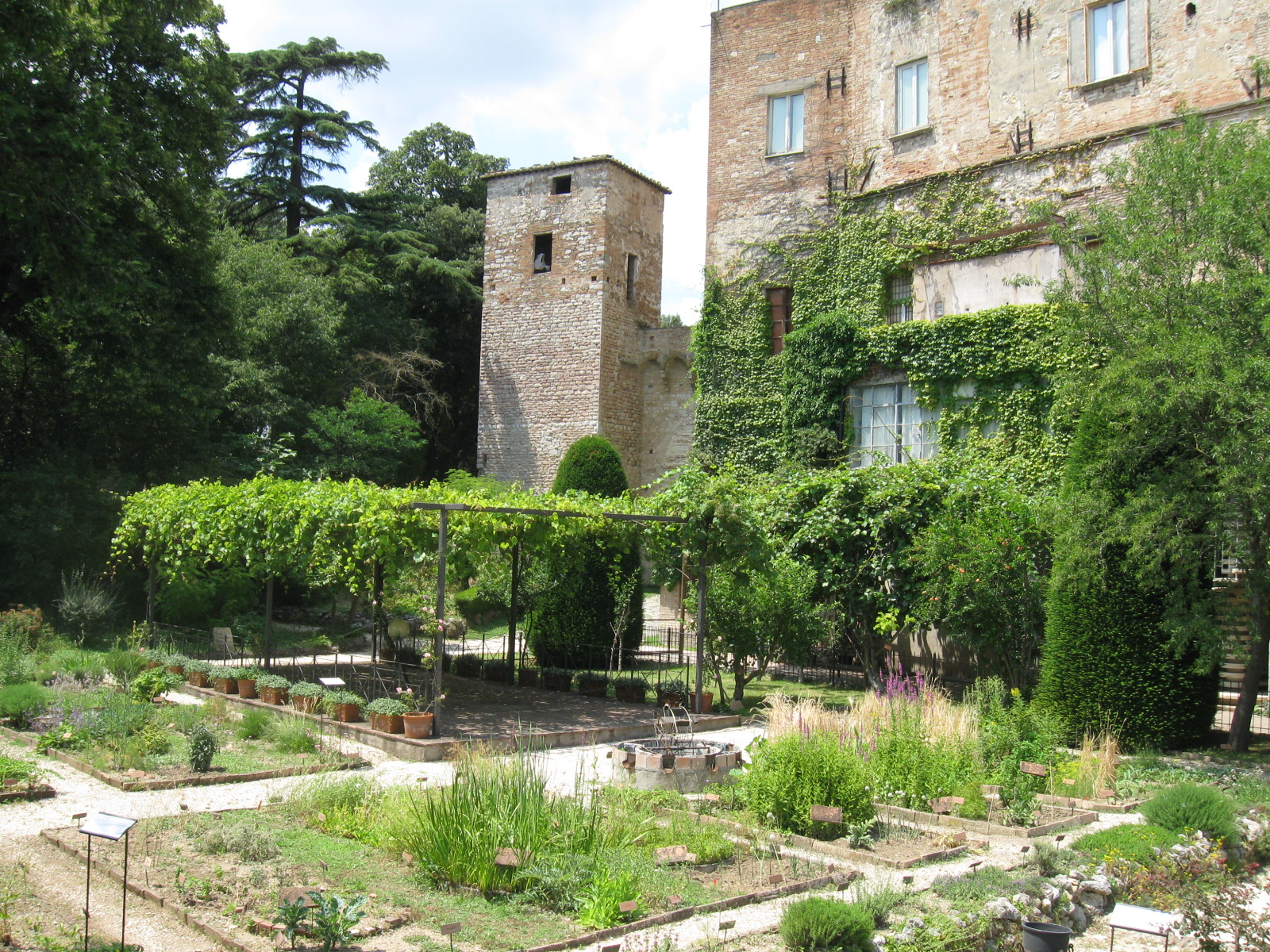
Modern attempt to recreate a medieval garden in Perugia, Italy

Many illuminated manuscripts show gardens of rectangular beds, small enough to be worked from the side paths, in available locations within castle or palace walls and intended for choice plants. They were transient as they were remade annually in spring. Usually they appear raised above the surrounding surface by a few inches. Those plants that were to be reused were grown in flowerpots and taken to a safe place in the autumn. These included trained bay trees, and, from the fifteenth century, the tender gilliflowers (known today as carnations). Most medieval castles and palaces had gardens; often small gardens were placed below the bed chambers of the owner. In England we find the gardener at Havering Palace in Essex holding hereditary office in the early twelfth century. A garden at Woodstock Palace was maintained as a manorial obligation, for the service of tending it was attached to land nearby.

The surround to a whole enclosed garden might be simple hedge, in which case it would probably consist of pleached quickset (hawthorn) entwined with brambles and dog roses. A more decorative version might have eglantine (sweet briar).

If the enclosed area contained cultivated beds these would probably have been protected by posts and rails with a latticework infill. The white and red roses would most likely be found entwined in it. The beds grew herbs for the pot and for physick (medicine). They could also be annuals to which no use had yet been ascribed but which were valued for their beauty. Some of the more traditional flowers such as the lily (a bulb) and the peony (a perennial) were, though, better admired in the herber growing through the grass.

Flowers were used for altar and church decoration, and a number of spring and summer feast days were associated with the flowers likely to be blooming at the time, which might also be worn or decorate doorways. No doubt many, like hawthorn branches, were taken from the wild. The use of strewing herbs as part of the straw and other plant material spread on floors indoors meant smelling herbs such as sage might be grown in large quantities.

The cultivated garden's cycle was the same as in agriculture, the annual herbs being sown in March or April and harvested in the autumn. Over winter the garden would be dug over and manured, and then the garden was re-made every spring. Hence alleys and edges were annual. Pruned and clipped evergreen trees or shrubs, often sweet-bay, and sometimes trained into estrade shapes, could be grown in northern Europe in pots and plunged as the garden was re-made, only to be raised in the autumn and taken indoors away from the cold.

Records of royal gardeners at the Palace of Westminster begin in 1262 but end with a tenderer of the King's Vine in 1366. The vineyard garden was adjacent to the extant Jewel Tower constructed in 1365 at the south—west corner of the palace precinct. Such gardens would be ornamental, combining pleasant alleys through tonnelles with productive vines overhead. Perhaps the abundance of miniatures depicting such scenes gives the impression that medieval gardens were perforce tightly constrained, but it is important to remember that the hortus conclusus was not the limit of recreational activity, especially for the menfolk. Often pleasure gardens (discussed below) formed a separate space, enclosed by a wall, fence or hedge a walk away from the busy and tightly built-up castle itself. These might be large areas, including woodland, pools and other features such as aviaries.

== Parks ==
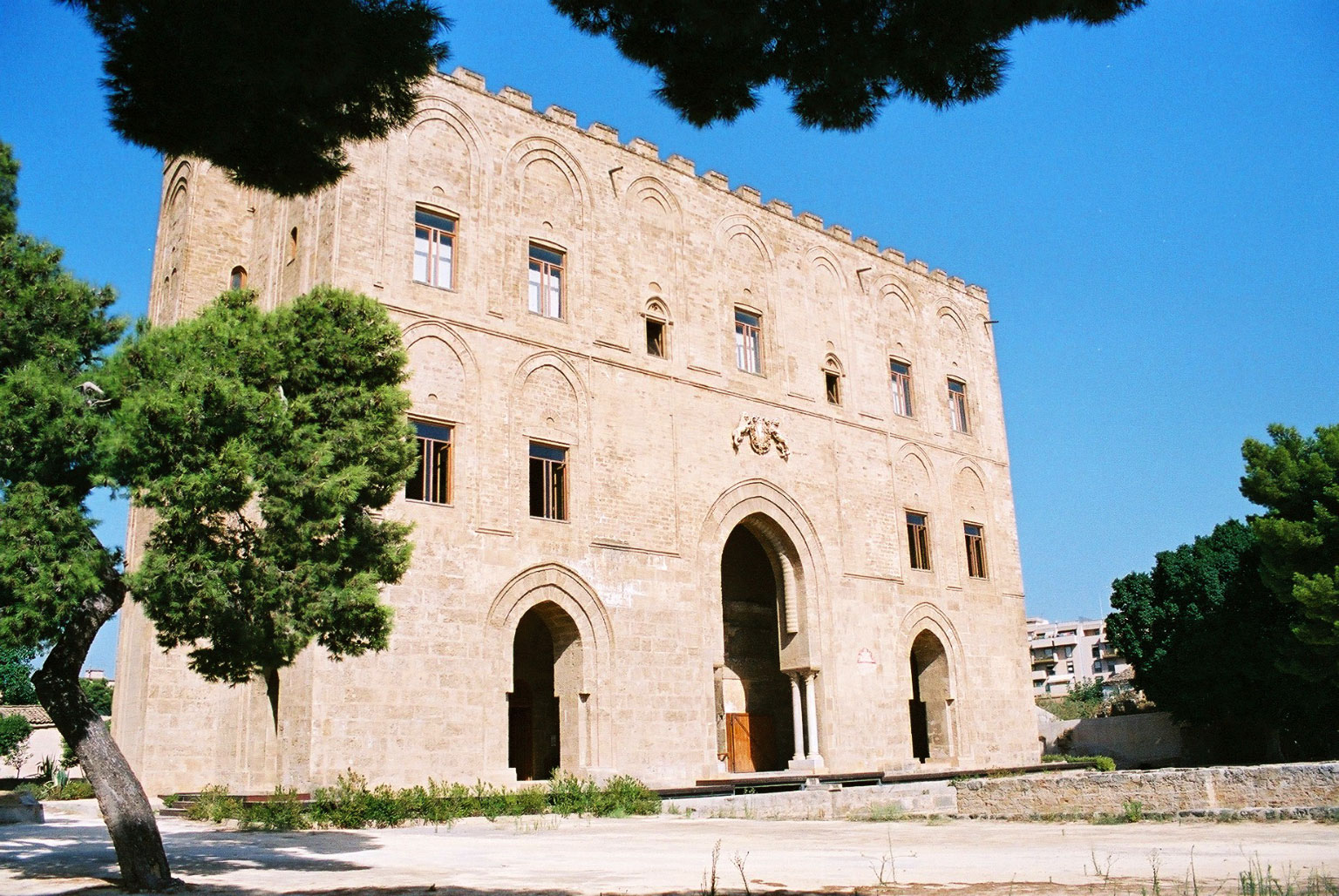
The Zisa, Palermo, begun 1165, one of the "pavilions" in the Norman park, with water flowing through the main hall.

The early medieval style of hunting was the unrestricted free chase through the forest, though this was a privilege restricted to the monarch and his followers. From the eleventh century parks began to emerge, enclosed by hedge, paling or wall intended for the protection of the game from poachers. Larger ones could be many hundreds of hectares. Although parks are generally thought of as hunting reserves, they served a wider recreational purpose and might have menageries and places of retreat with their own herbers; the prime English example, Woodstock, had all of these by the 13th century. Henry I of England considered Woodstock Palace the 'favourite seat of his retirement and privacy' and where from 1113 he enclosed a large park with a stone wall containing a variety of exotic animals. Horace Walpole described the large English medieval parks as "contracted forests, and extended gardens".

At Palermo around 1150, the Norman King Roger II of Sicily built a vast park enclosed by a stone wall with a series of pavilions or palaces served by water brought by underground conduits and then conducted from one pool to another. The design was greatly influenced by Islamic architecture and there were orange trees and peacocks. By 1166, though at a much smaller scale, Henry II of England created a series of three pools below a spring close to Woodstock Palace and to which were attached cloisters and other buildings.

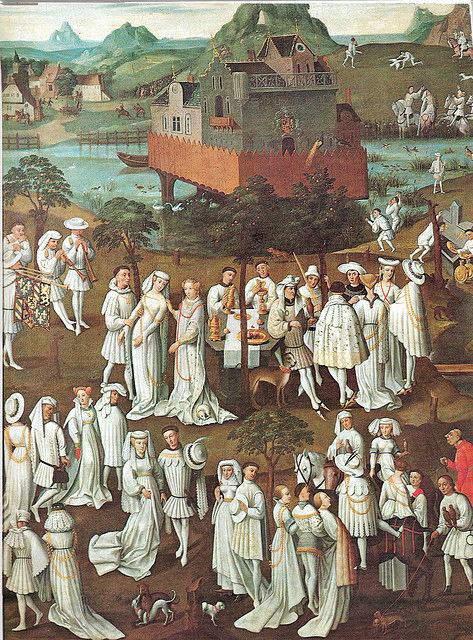
Burgundian court wedding party in the park at Hesdin, 16th-century copy of lost 15th-century image.

Robert II, Count of Artois, who had strong connections with Sicily, added a park of 800 hectares to his chateau at Hesdin from 1288. It acquired many ornamental features. A ‘petit Paradis’ under the walls contained osiers, vines, roses and lilies. There were orchards of apple, cherry, plum and pear trees and slightly further away a menagerie. The most elaborate area was the further part, with pools and a sizeable pavilion. The bridge to it was lined with marionettes of monkeys covered in badger skin and there were bowers, a hut that could turn to avoid the wind, a rose garden and water-spouting devices. Hesdin remained famous for two and a half centuries.

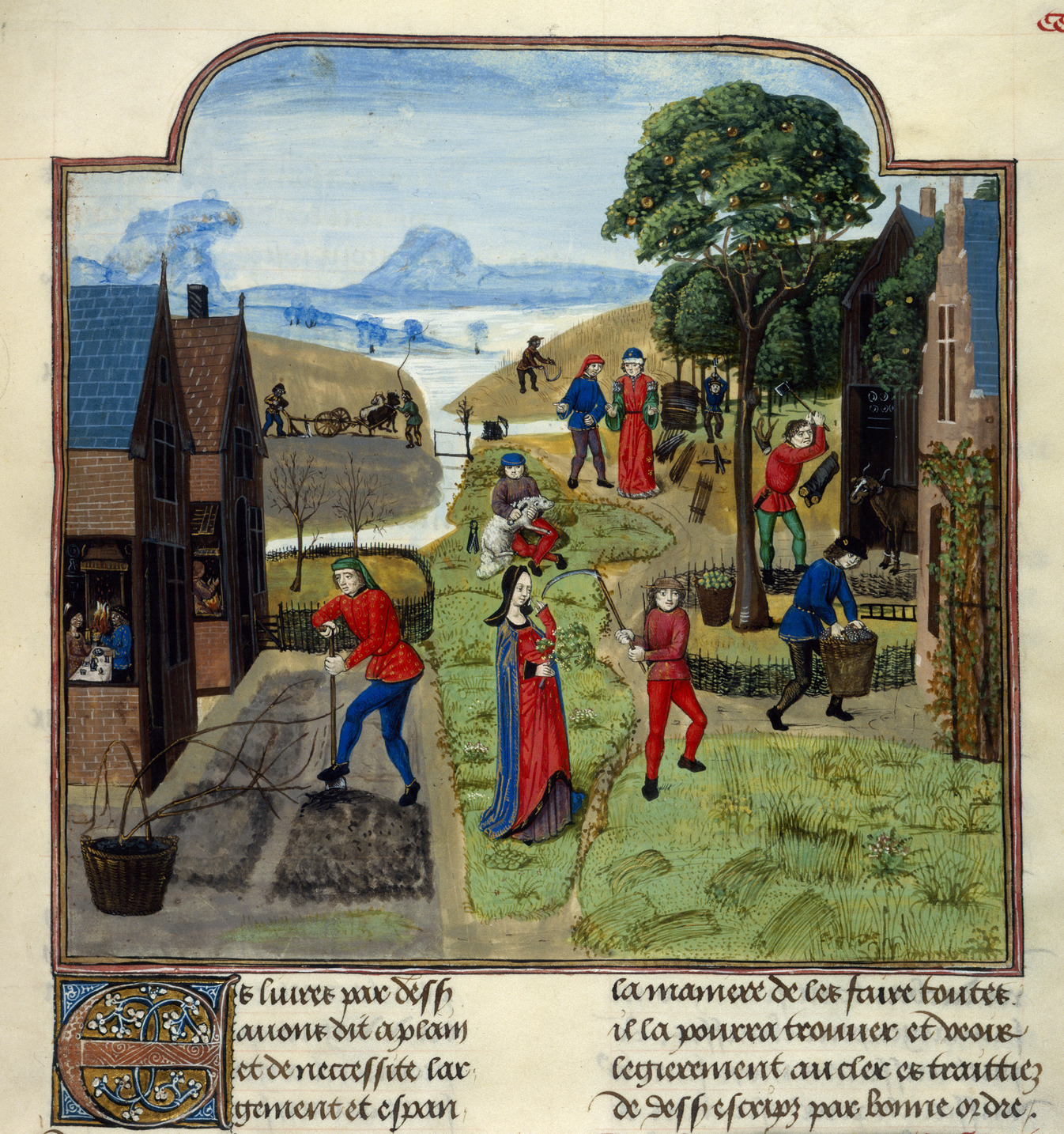
Illustration to Pietro de' Crescenzi, French, late 15th century; all 12 Labours of the Months are shown.

In his book on husbandry, Liber Ruralium Commodorum, written about 1300, Pietro de' Crescenzi envisaged larger gardens as small parks with ‘a fountain flowing through all its parts and places’, aviaries and numbers of stags, roebucks, hares and rabbits. He advised woodland as shelter to the north of a residence, and an open meadow (known in English as a ‘lawn’) to the south so that the animals could be seen from the palace windows. In this spirit Galeazzo Visconti II, lord of Milan, enclosed Visconti Park adjacent to his castle in Pavia from the 1360s. Its 2,200 hectares was devoted to entertainment, including tournaments, picnic expeditions, hunting and horse racing.

Retreats away from the stresses of court life were often sought. At Sheen Palace near London, Richard II of England formed one on an island in the Thames in the late fourteenth century. Like Everswell before and the Kenilworth Pleasance after, it stood in a line of retreats from the pressures of court life. Half a century later, Humphrey, Duke of Gloucester, and brother of Henry V, rebuilt the manor house at Greenwich, on the Thames downstream from London, and enclosed a park of 188 acres. He renamed it the ‘Manor of Bella Court’ (later the Palace of Placentia) for its delightful situation.

The deer park in Britain has been extensively studied, and it has become clear that it was multi-purpose. Some of the smallest were effectively pleasure grounds, while gardens could be attached to lodges in parkland. So-called ‘little parks’ were often located close to, or under the walls, of the castle. These appear to have preserved or created appropriate settings and provided venues for entertainments. The inner park at Clarendon Palace, in place by 1265, and the Little Park at Windsor of 1360, are examples. Parks and little parks may have been embellished, but one cannot see them as ‘designed’ in the modern sense.

== Herbers and arbours ==
The usual term for a pleasure garden was viridarium (green place), though viretum (greensward) was sometimes used. The English equivalent was ‘herber’ (‘herbarium’ in dog Latin), which was turfed and not the equivalent of a ‘herb garden’. In France, this form of garden was known from the mid-twelfth century though it shared its name with the productive orchard, the 'vergier', and is illustrated in numerous medieval miniatures.

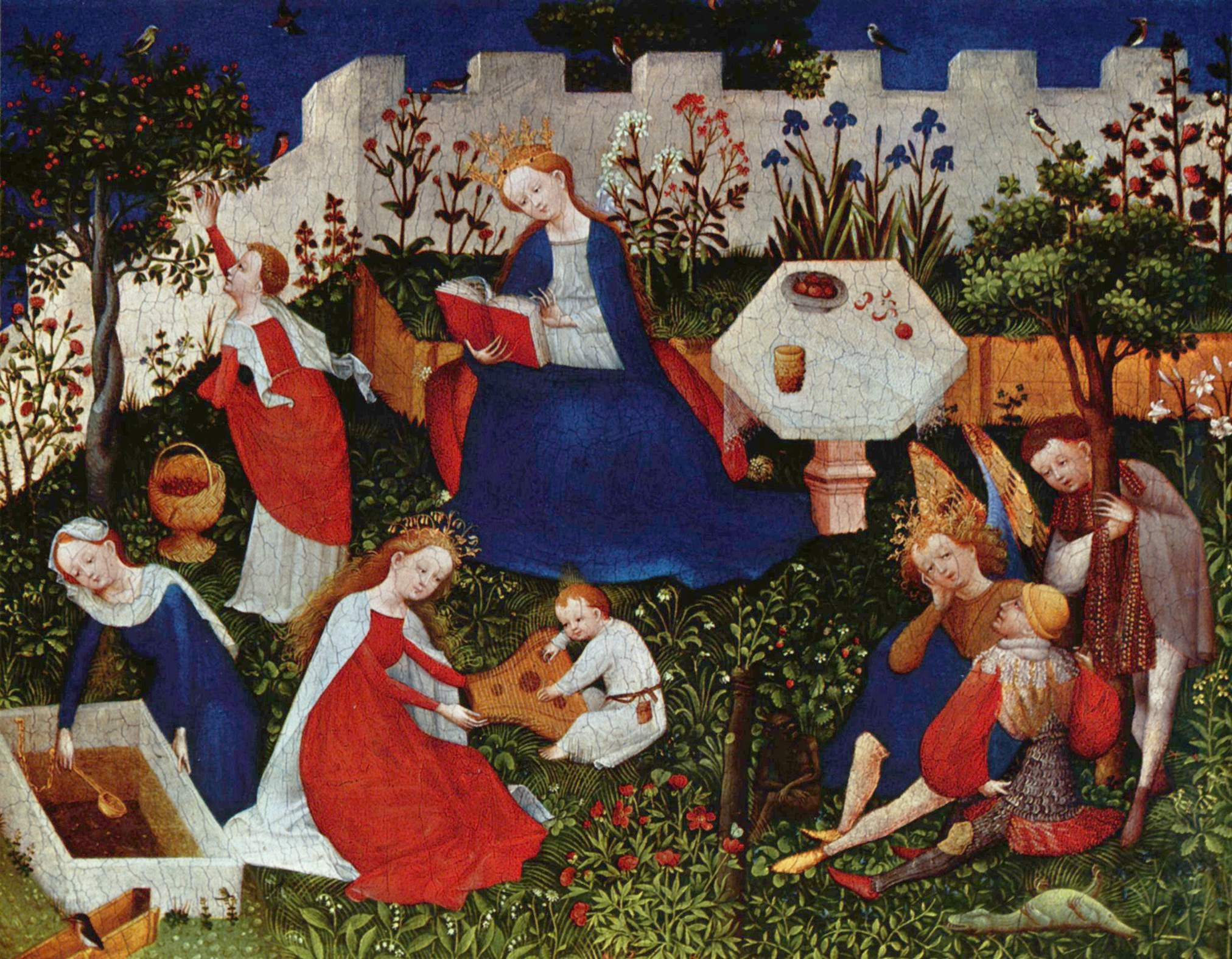
Paradise Garden, with the Virgin, child Jesus, and saints, 1410s, Rhineland

Viridaria had trees but must be distinguished from fruit orchards (pomerium, vergier) where the emphasis was on production rather than delight. Nevertheless, the spectacle of the flowering of cherries and pears en masse was prized. A viridarium might fit within some architectural arrangement but there was no expectation that it would be a perfect geometrical figure – that imperative was to arise in the late fifteenth century in Italy.

in 1195/96, an herber was made at great cost in the Upper Ward at Windsor Castle. Even more elaborate were the pleasure gardens, along with menageries and model farms, created at a series of castles in Apulia in Southern Italy in the 1230s and 1240s built by Frederick II, Holy Roman Emperor, and grandson of Roger II of Sicily.

Henry III of England ordered an herber around the ponds at Everswell at Woodstock in 1239. In 1251 he was to make two good high walls around the queen's garden with an herber by the king's stew in which she could walk. The herber was then turfed, and in 1264 a hundred pear trees were ordered.

A description of how to form a viridarium was provided by the German bishop, theologian and saint Albertus Magnus (d. 1280) in a section on ‘De plantionibus viridariorum’ of about 1260. One would level the ground, sterilise it with boiling water, lay turf, tamp it down and plant it around the edges with taller flowers and ornamental trees. Smaller flowers could be dug out of meadows and planted as plugs into the sward, giving the millefleur or flowery mead effect, and later in the year the grass would be suppressed by rolling. The trees were grown for visual appeal, shade, and their fruit. Shade-giving structures within the herber could be adorned with climbers.

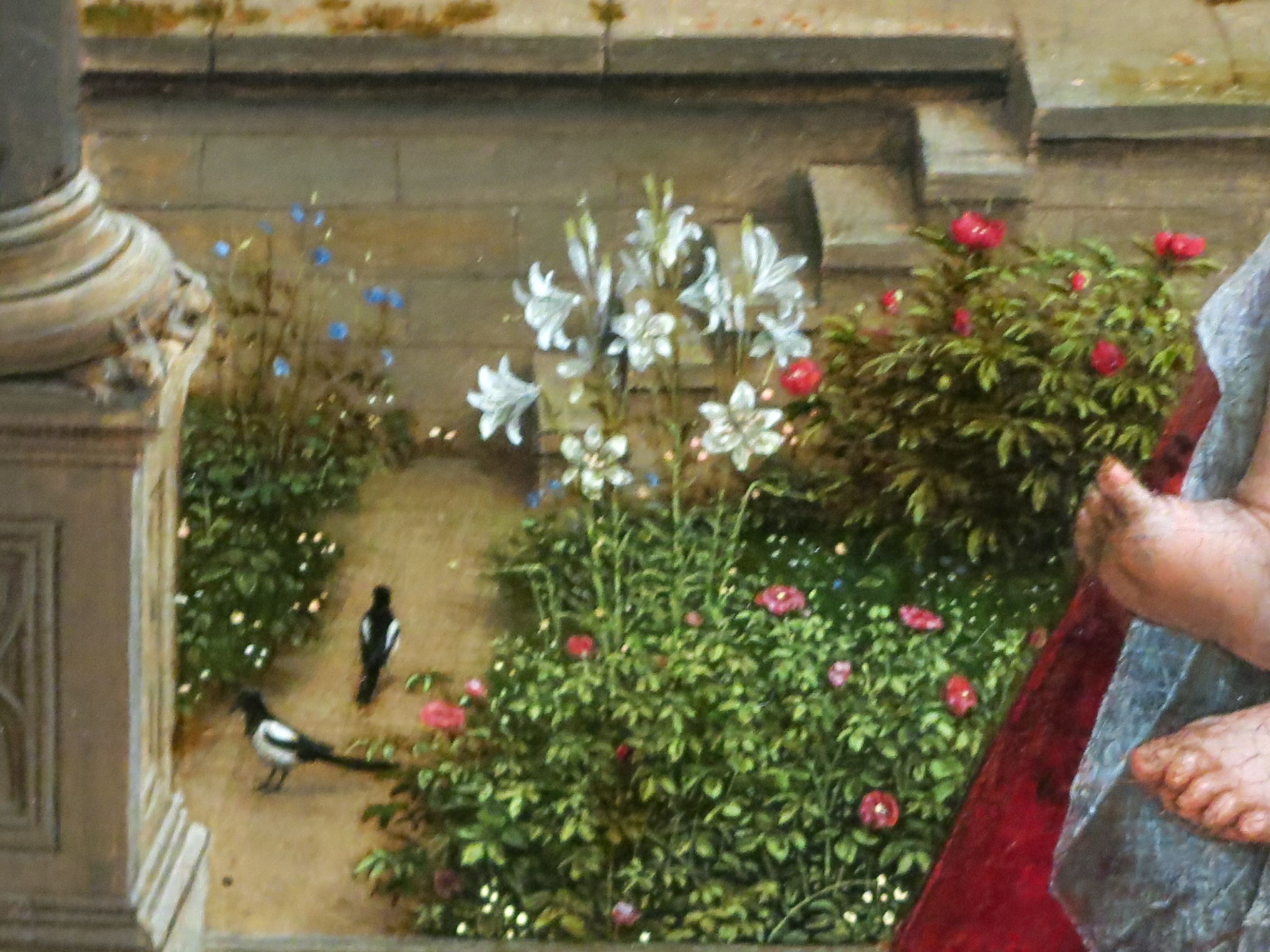
Detail of the garden in Jan van Eyck's c. 1435 Virgin of Chancellor Rolin, with roses, lilies, and peonies

This advice was borrowed by Pietro de’ Crescenzi of Bologna shortly after 1300 for a chapter in his Liber Ruralium Commodorum. This latter work, giving advice on the many aspects of managing a rural estate, and citing Latin authors, was translated into French in 1373 and went into print from 1471 to become the most popular manual well beyond the Middle Ages, with over 100 surviving manuscript copies (in four languages) and about 60 printed editions.

The more prominent plants that lent the herber its character were often the ancestors of common garden plants used today—violets, heartsease (pansy), daisies, strawberries (wild), cowslips, periwinkle, rose campions and wild red campions. Around the edges one might find taller bulbs and roots, including roses, the Madonna lily (bulbs sold by the quart), borage, stocks, wallflowers, purple fleur-de-lys, hollyhocks, ‘female’ peonies, columbine, marigold and lavender.

These were mostly native European species, little changed from their wild forms. The techniques of feeding, taking cuttings, transplanting, pruning and grafting were understood, but the last was essentially reserved for fruit trees (apples and pears mainly). At least one writer thought earthworms a pest to be removed.

Fruit trees that were planted into the turf might include the Pearmain and Costard cooking apples or cooking pears such as Caillou Rosat (Rosy pebble) and Pesse-pucelle. There might be the bullace plum, sweet cherries, (black) mulberries, medlars, peaches, quince, and service trees. Filberts (a type of hazel) were common, walnut trees less so. Shrubs valued for being evergreen were juniper and savin.

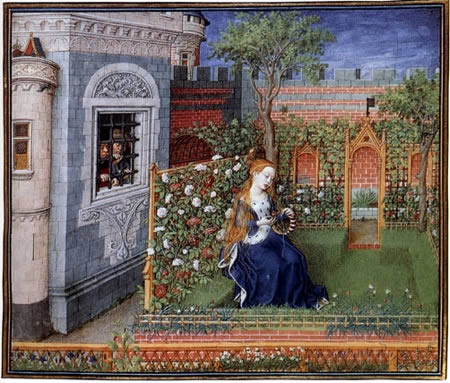
Emilia in the rose garden from Boccaccio's Teseida, French, c. 1460.

Vineyards flourished in the twelfth and thirteenth centuries in southern England. Outside the walls of Windsor Castle Henry I acquired 5½ acres in about 1110 for a ‘Great Garden’ reached by a bridge over the moat. It was a vineyard, replanted by Henry III of England from 1239. Sheen was much favoured by Edward III of England who ordered a vineyard garden to be made 1358—61.

There are signs in the fourteenth century that the standard form of the ‘herber’ was changing. Two factors seem to have been in play. Colder climatic conditions set in during the fourteenth century, and vineyards declined as commercial enterprises, though vines remained in decorative contexts, for example growing on trellises in herbers. Secondly, fruit had an increasingly important place at the high-status tables. Apples, pears, cherries and damsons fetched high prices and were traded by fruiterers. Orchards (vergiers) multiplied with some even protected by moats.

Fruit and nut trees, formerly planted randomly in open grass, were now set in larger and more specialised orchards. The herber then became a garden construction of withy or timber, often incorporating turf seats, and over-arched to become tunnels with sanded alleys and then elaborated with aviaries to bring birdsong into the garden. The material of an arbour was usually willow, and planted over with climbers. These could be (white) bryony or honeysuckle, but the tradition was vines. An alternative to willow since Classical times was suckers of ‘English elm’ which root themselves readily when plunged into the ground. In French arbours and bowers were referred to as ‘treilles’ or ‘tonnelles’. In English the word ‘herber’ mutated through changes in spoken English into ‘arbour’.

The 15th century poet John Lydgate described an herber/arbour with turfed bench seats and a fountain: Alle the aleis were made playne with sond, The benches turved with newe turvis grene, Sote herbers, with condite at the honde, That wellid up agayne the sonne shene, Lyke silver stremes as any christalle clene...

== Pools and moats ==
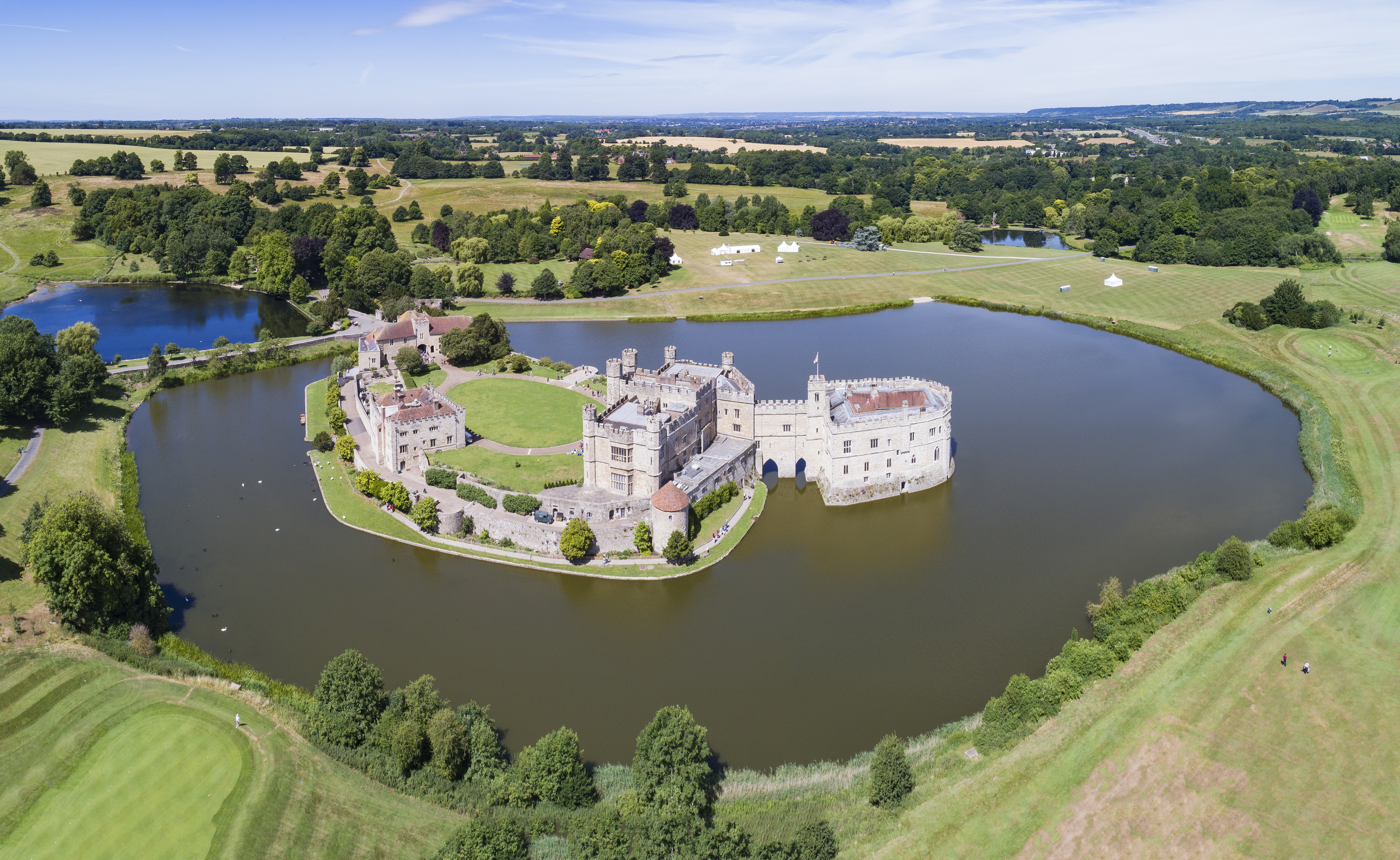
Leeds Castle in Kent

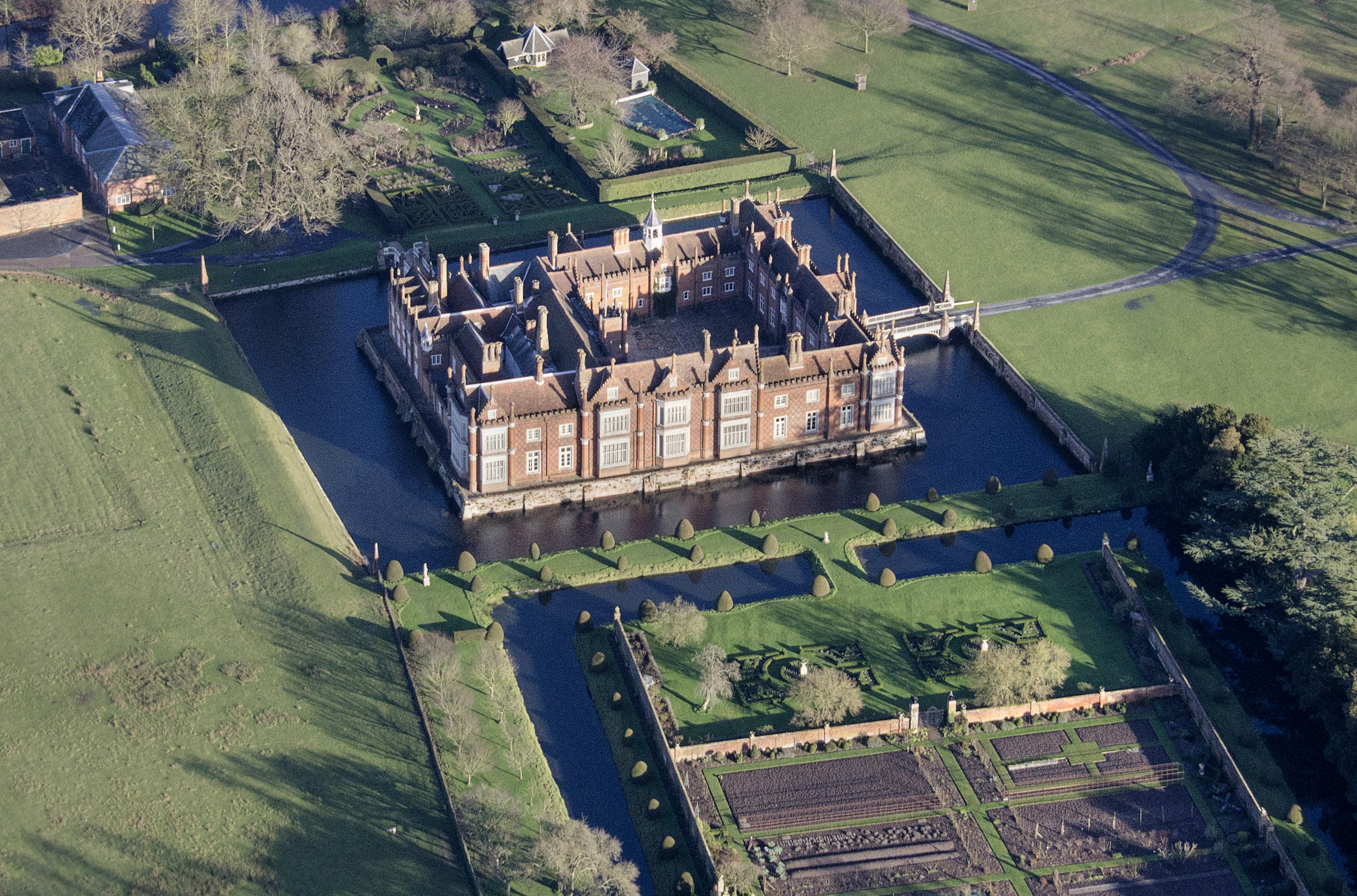
The paired moats of Helmingham Hall, Suffolk; the house is 16th-century and later

Whether a luxury for its scarcity, as in Sicily, or a practicality because of its abundance, as in England, water was a much desired decorative element in medieval gardens and parks. Fishponds, moats and rivers provided food in the form of fish and waterfowl.

Fishponds were a familiar element of monastic sites. In the secular context, pools were part of the pleasure complex at Hesdin. In England, pools and broad sheets of water were favoured for aesthetic reasons at several places from the 1290s if not before, for example at Leeds Castle in Kent and Framlingham Castle in Suffolk. Perhaps the largest was at Kenilworth Castle. By 1389 the names of bridges and gates make it clear that the great lake was then existing.

All earthen Motte-and-bailey castles had moats, although later ones tended to be built on rock or in stone and had a dry moat at best. The phenomenon of the semi-defensive moated manor house arose, especially in England, where many thousands of moats were dug between 1250 and 1400, though they continued to be created at high-status places during the sixteenth century. They had a number of pleasing advantages, even if none would have been decisive by itself. They were ornamental but could drain surrounding lands. They gave an aura of dignity and semblance of fortification, even if sometimes only three sides were excavated. They were profitable as fisheries, and provided a barrier giving everyday security, as well as marking out the lord's private domain.

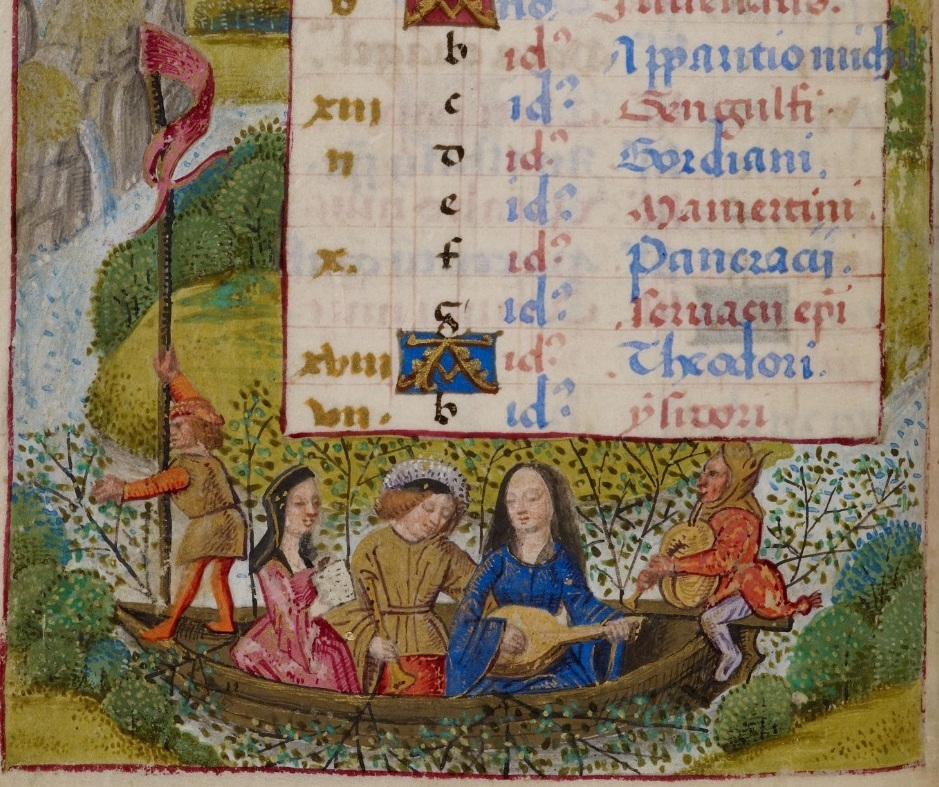
"Boating in May", calendar miniature from the Hours of Joanna of Castile, c. 1500

Calendar miniatures for May (and sometimes April) often show a mixed party in a small boat with blossoming branches, sometimes playing music; a traditional May Day celebration across much of Europe.

Occasionally one finds a double moat, such as that at Peterborough Abbey constructed in 1302 around a herber. Another was made around ‘le plesans en marais’ that Henry V of England ordered to be made in 1414-7 on the far side of the lake by Kenilworth Castle. There were also twin or paired moats, though it is usually impossible to know whether the second moated area was for extra buildings, or for gardens, as one suspects at the surviving one at Helmingham Hall in Suffolk. Walls within such moats could be truly defensive, or tricked up to appear so. The c. 1385 Bodiam Castle had thin but battlemented walls and was set in a moat large enough to class as a mere.

Some bishops and aristocrats elaborated their palaces with large areas of water. At the Bishop’s Palace, Wells, surviving walls enclosing a large garden were constructed in 1341 with a wide moat outside.

== Medieval pleasure gardens ==
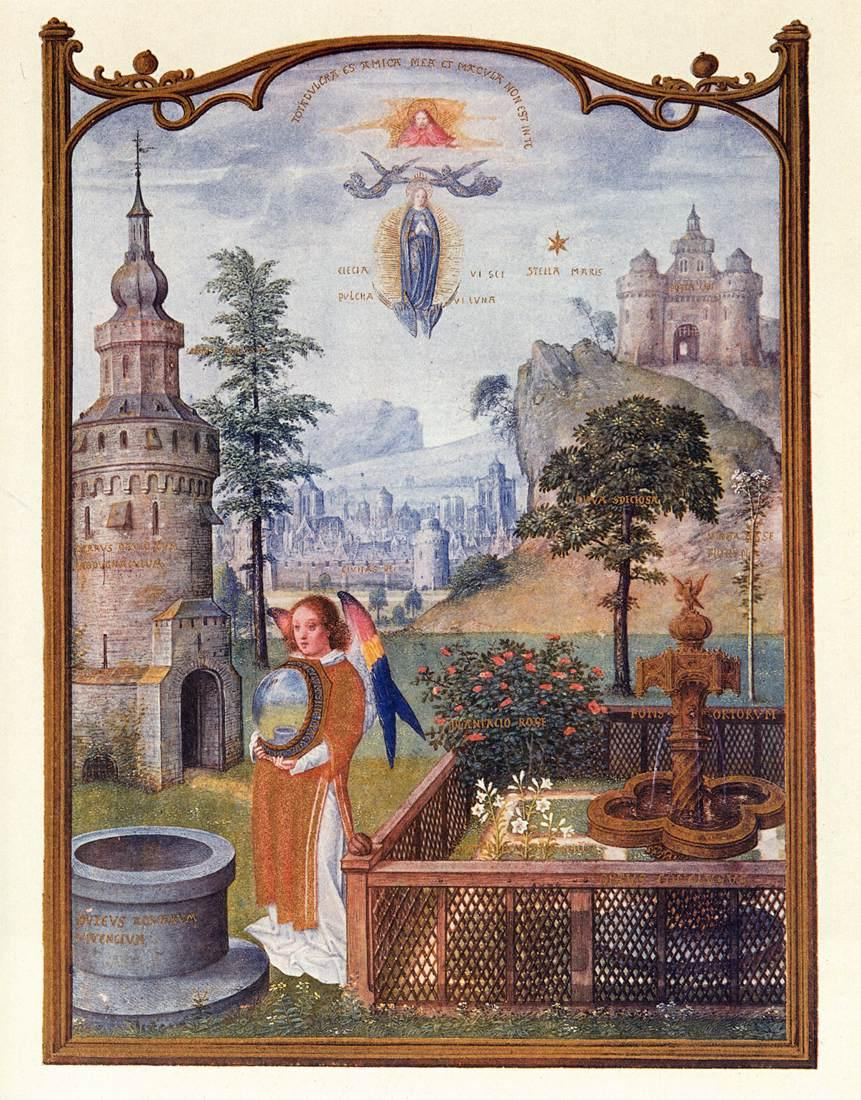
Hortus conclusus, with Mystical Attributes of the Virgin, Flanders, around 1500

Fountains, ‘the fountain of life’, were sometimes seen at the centre of monastic cloisters, as well as in civic settings. Albertus Magnus wrote of viridaria around 1260 that ‘no trees must be planted in the middle of the turf... if possible, a clear fountain in a stone basin should be in the midst, for its purity gives much pleasure’. Many very elaborate fountains appear in illuminated manuscripts, although they were probably less common, and much simpler, in reality.

The familiar southern Italian courtyard with pools or fountains amid flower-studded grass, vine pergolas and shaded walks, is well recorded from the thirteenth century. Sometimes they included loggias for outside seating or dining. Boccaccio’s Amorosa visione (1342) related how the royal gardens between Castel Nuovo in Naples and the sea were filled with sculpture.

The mythical Greek Daedalus is said to have created the labyrinth for Minos, King of Crete. Another was made for Robert II's daughter, Mahaut, Countess of Artois, outside the park at Hesdin in 1311 with a central turret. The Hôtel Saint-Pol in Paris acquired another around 1370. Duke René of Anjou made his own at his Château de Baugé, in the Loire valley, in 1477. He was also famous for his gardens, with their tonnelles, aviaries and pavilions, and his promotion of horticulture, introducing the mulberry to his lands in Provence, and the carnation to Anjou. He spent his final years up till 1480 in his garden at Aix-en-Provence where he enjoyed his ‘grand gallerie’.

Other galleries had been seen at the Hôtel Saint-Pol where in 1360 Charles V of France built some, supported by pillars, to surround orchards and vineyards. Other spaces were surrounded by tonnelles covered with vines and with pavilions at corners. In the middle of the central space was a bason of marble with water spurting from lions’ mouths. The gardens of the Alcázar of Seville, created by Peter of Castile in 1364-6, had wall-walks on arches.

Galleries appeared in other French gardens, before the fashion spread to England. One in Greenwich overlooked a hedged garden with an arbour made for Henry VI's Queen Margaret of Anjou, a daughter of René of Anjou, to sit in. In the 1500s Henry VII of England created new gardens at Richmond Palace entirely surrounded by galleries supported by oak posts. The last flourish of the gallery was perhaps at Henry's cousin Edward Stafford, 3rd Duke of Buckingham's Thornbury Castle, Gloucestershire, where before his execution in 1521 stone-built ones overlooked enclosed gardens; nearby was a magnificent herber, also one of the last.

== Mounts, mazes and knots ==
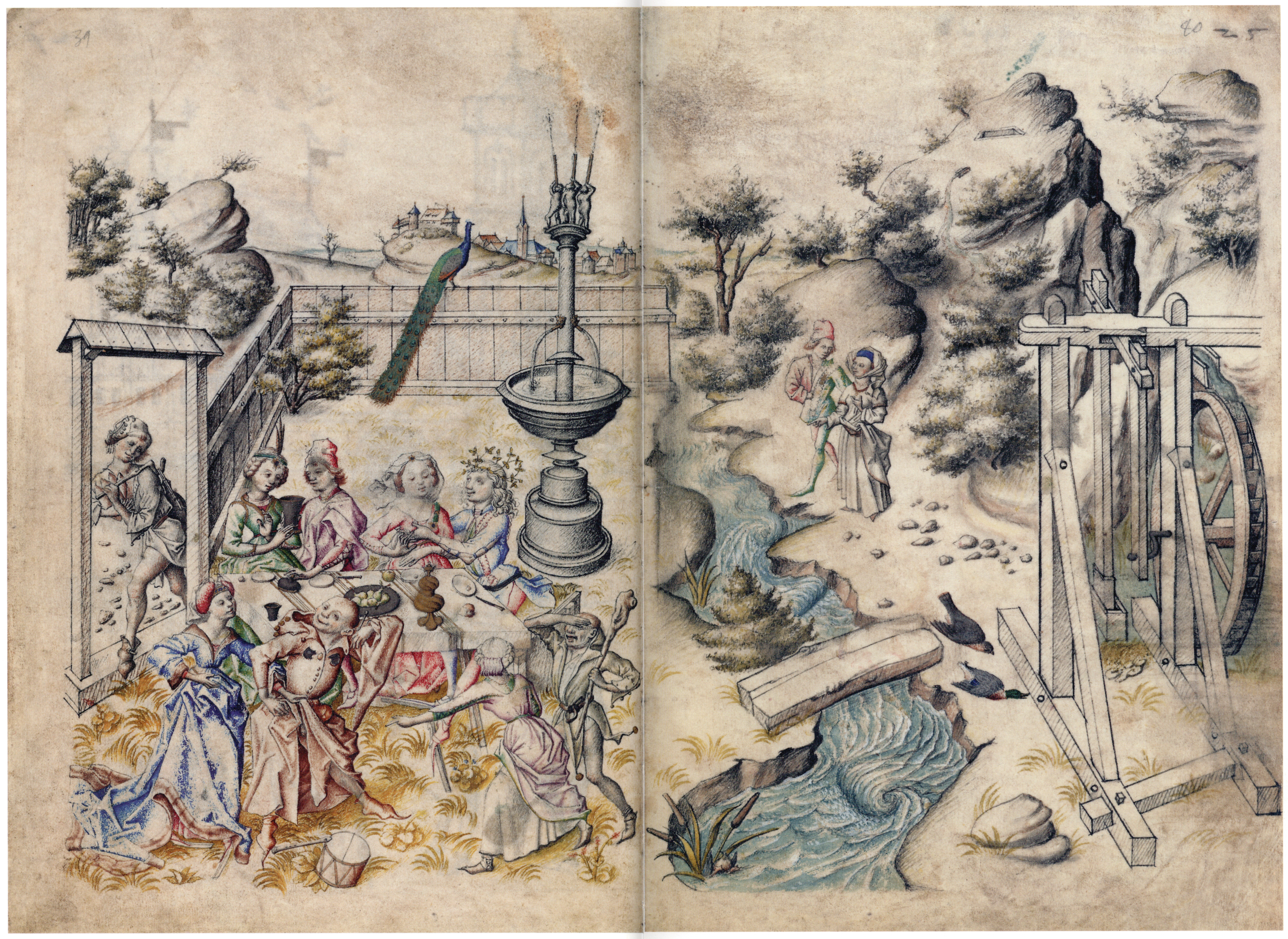
Feast in the Garden of Love, by the Housebook Master, German, last quarter of 15th century

Assertions that mounts, mazes and knots were medieval garden features have frequently been made though without corroboration from archive or archaeology. Until late in the nineteenth century the history of gardens was an assemblage of ‘gleanings’ from literary sources, a prime example being John Claudius Loudon, who included a ‘brief outline of the progress of the ancient style in England’ in his Encyclopædia of Gardening (1822) which attempted to define and date ancient garden features.

Alicia Amherst mostly followed Loudon. Sir Frank Crisp then made strenuous efforts to support both in his Mediæval Gardens (1924) but had to admit that he found no evidence amongst his numerous images from illuminated manuscripts of medieval mounts, mazes or knots. His images amply demonstrated that turfed benches, lattice-work fences, the flowery mead, fountains and the arbour belonged to his period, but he was perhaps too easily persuaded of the antiquity of other features. Loudon had generated several blunders. He thought that Leland's Itinerary was ‘published towards the end of the fifteenth century’, but it was composed half a century later. The snail-mount at Marlborough, Wiltshire (actually Neolithic), cut with a spiral path in the seventeenth century, was offered as a surviving example of a late medieval mount. Crisp's search for mediæval garden mounts turned out to be fruitless.

According to popular legend, Henry II had his meetings with his mistress Rosamund Clifford in a bower at Woodstock in the middle of a "labyrinth", but she was tracked down and given the choice of poison or a dagger by the jealous queen. Amherst mistakenly remarked that ‘in reality labyrinths were by no means uncommon’ in the reign of Henry II of England. She ascribed great antiquity to mizmazes, and the conception of them as authentic folk devices with origins in deep history, lives on, but the plain fact is that no English garden mazes, or rural ones, can be cited with certainty before the late sixteenth century. Crisp confessed in relation to labyrinths: ‘As with topiary-work no illustrations are recorded until after the Middle Ages had passed’, despite literary references to dédales.

In arguing for an early date for knot gardens, Loudon drew attention to the parterre designs depicted by Jacques Androuet du Cerceau (in the 1570s), and supposed that ‘scarcely a ground-plot [was] not laid out as a parterre or labyrinth’. He had understood that du Cerceau dated from ‘the time of Henry III’. A king of this name certainly reigned in England in the mid-thirteenth century, but Loudon's source, Horace Walpole, was actually referring to Henri III of France who reigned three centuries later! But Crisp had convinced himself that ‘Knots were distinctly mediæval in their origin...’. On the other hand, they were already well established in Italy and France during the fifteenth century.

A medieval Italian word for designing textiles with interweaving threads or ribbons – ‘innodature’ – was adopted for similar designs in garden beds. The English equivalent ‘knot’ had a broader meaning as any form of intricate work, not necessarily involving crossing or interlacing designs. Harvey made very little mention of garden knots, but he understood that ‘as early as 1494 “A knot in a garden, called a mase” was an understood commonplace...’. His source was Robert Fabyan's Chronicles, as slightly misdated in the Oxford English Dictionary. Fabyan composed his work from 1502, with publication in 1516. In fact, the first convincing reference to any form of English garden knot occurs in the 1500s, in Hawes' poem (see above) probably descriptive of Richmond Palace.

== Sources ==
- Amherst, Alicia (1895) A History of Gardening in England, London: Bernard Quaritch.
- Brown, Jane, The Pursuit of Paradise: A Social History of Gardens and Gardening, 1999, Harper Collins, ISBN 0002558440
- Colvin, Howard (1986) ‘Royal Gardens in Medieval England’, Medieval Gardens, ed. E. MacDougall, Dumbarton Oaks Colloquium on the History of Landscape Architecture IX, 7–22, Washington, D.C.
- Creighton, Oliver (2009) Designs upon the Land: Elite landscapes of the Middle Ages, Woodbridge: Boydell Press.
- Crisp, Frank (1924) Mediæval Gardens... with some Account of Tudor, Elizabethan and Stuart Gardens, London: The Bodley Head.
- Hagopian van Buren, Anne (1986) ‘Royal Gardens in Medieval England’, Medieval Gardens, ed. E. MacDougall, Dumbarton Oaks Colloquium on the History of Landscape Architecture IX, 115-34, Washington, D.C.
- Hall, James, Hall's Dictionary of Subjects and Symbols in Art, 1996 (2nd edn.), John Murray, ISBN 0719541476
- Harvey, John (1981) Mediaeval Gardens, London: Batsford.
- Hobhouse, Penelope, Plants in Garden History, 2004, Pavilion Books, ISBN 1862056609
- Hope, W.H. St John (1913) Windsor Castle: An Architectural History, 2 vols, London: Country Life.
- Hunt, John Dixon, A World of Gardens, 2012, Reaktion Books, ISBN 9781861898807
- Jacques, David, (1999). "The Compartiment System in Tudor England", Garden History, 27. 32-53. 10.2307/1587172, Researchgate
- Jacques, David (2024) Tudor and Stuart Royal Gardens, Oxford: Windgather Press
- "Jellicoes": The Oxford Companion to Gardens, eds. Geoffrey Jellicoe, Susan Jellicoe, Patrick Goode and Michael Lancaster (John Harvey contributing "Medieval Garden"), 1986, OUP, ISBN 0192861387
- Keay, Anna & John Watkins (2013) The Elizabethan Garden at Kenilworth Castle, Swindon: English Heritage, 155-63.
- Landsberg, Sylvia, The Medieval Garden, British Museum Press, ISBN 9780714120805
- Leslie, Michael (ed.), A Cultural History of Gardens: Vol 2, In the Medieval Age, 2016, Bloomsbury Academic, ISBN 9781350009905
- Loudon, John Claudius (1822) An Encyclopædia of Gardening, London: Longman et al.
- Lydgate, J. (1840) ‘The chorle and the bird’, Early English Poetry, vol. II, Selection from the Minor Poems of Dan John Lydgate, edited by J. Orchard Halliwell, London: Percy Society, 179–193.
- Masson, Georgina (1966) Italian Gardens, London: Thames & Hudson
- Morgan, Joan, Book of Pears: The Definitive History and Guide to Over 500 Varieties, 2015, Chelsea Green Publishing, ISBN 9781603586665, google books
- Quest-Ritson, Charles, The English Garden: A Social History, 2003, Penguin, ISBN 9780140295023
- Sauval, Henri (1724) Histoire et recherches des antiquités de la ville de Paris, 2 vols.
- Thacker, Christopher, The Genius of Gardening: The History of Gardens in Britain and Ireland, 1994, Weidenfeld and Nicolson, ISBN 0297833545
- Uglow, Jenny, A Little History of British Gardening, 2004, Chatto & Windus, ISBN 0701169281
- Woodbridge, Kenneth (1986) Princely Gardens: The origins and development of the French formal style, London: Thames & Hudson.
