= Oxford Psalter =

The Oxford Psalter (manuscript Douce 320 Bodleian Library, Oxford) is a 12th-century psalter written in Anglo-Norman Old French. Its content is almost identical to that of the Winchester Psalter, except the latter is written in Latin and Anglo-Norman Old French. In his book Libri Psalmorum versio antiqua Gallica e cod. ms. in Bibl. Bodleiana, Francisque Michel does a full transcription of the psalter, writing the Winchester Psalter variants in the footnotes under the header Cott. Cod. (Cotton Codex; the shelfmark of the Winchester Psalter is British Library Cotton MS. Nero C.iv).

Digital Bodleian estimates the manuscript to be from 1140 to 1150, while the Trésor de langue française informatisé in its etymologies uses 'first half of the 12th century'. The Dictionnaire Étymologique de l'Ancien Français gives a date of 'mid-12th century' for both the Oxford and the Winchester Psalter.

== Modern editions ==
- Francisque Michel, Libri Psalmorum versio antiqua Gallica e cod. ms. in Bibl. Bodleiana. 1860. Available on Google Books.
- Ian Short, The Oxford Psalter (Bodleian MS Douce 320). Oxford: Anglo-Norman Text Society, 2015. ISBN 0-905474-61-9.
