= Robert de Gretham =

Anglo-Norman literary person and cleric

Robert de Gretham, alternatively Robert de Greetham, (fl. 13th century) was an Anglo-Norman literary person and cleric. He was noted for the book Etude sur le Miroir ou les Evangiles des domnees.

Etude was written for a Lady Elena of Quency. However, de Grethammay have been aiming at a broader audience by using a amasculine plural. The work was intended to act as a "Looking Glass for the Soul", hence the title.

De Gretham may have also written Corset, a book on popular theology. It was dedicated to someone named Alain and Alain's wife.
