= Simon de Fresne =

Anglo-Norman cleric and poet

Simund de Freine (Simon de Fresne) (fl. 1200) was an Anglo-Norman cleric and poet. He was a canon of Hereford Cathedral and a friend of Giraldus Cambrensis.

== Works ==
Simund's major works were two long poems in Norman French, in heptasyllabic verse, each identified by acrostics:

- De la Fortune, an adaptation of the De Consolatio Philosophiæ by Boethius, 1700 lines.
- La vie de Saint Georges.

He addressed two epigrams to Giraldus Cambrensis, defending him against detractors, such as Adam of Dore. Simund's patron is thought to be William de Vere.
