= The Crusade and Death of Richard I =

The Crusade and Death of Richard I is a mid-13th-century Anglo-Norman prose chronicle by an anonymous author. It tells of the journey of Richard the Lionheart, King of England to the Holy Land on the Third Crusade (kings' Crusade) from 1190 to 1191. The chronicle details the trip through France, Sicily, and Cyprus, as well as the siege and capture of Acre, Richard's capture in Austria on the return trip, and his eventual return to England. Later it describes his campaigns against Philip II of France in Normandy, and his death at Châlus in 1199. It is based on the writings by Roger of Howden, Roger of Wendover and Matthew Paris.
