= Robert de Ho =

Robert de Ho (c. 1140–1210) was a twelfth century writer of Anglo-Norman literature known for Enseignements Trebor. Trebor is Robert spelled backward and was for his son.
