= Lai de l'Oiselet =

The Lai de l'Oiselet ("The Lai of the Little Bird") is an Old French poem, preserved in five manuscripts dating from the 13th and 14th centuries, now held by the Bibliothèque Nationale, Paris.
