= List of English chronicles =

This is a list of the most important Chronicles relevant to the kingdom of England in the period from the Norman Conquest to the beginning of the Tudor dynasty (1066–1485). The chronicles are listed under the name by which they are commonly referred to. Some chronicles are known under the name of the chronicler to whom they are attributed, while some of these writers also have more than one work to their name. Though works may cover more than one reign, each chronicle is listed only once, with the dates covered. Only post-conquest dates have been included. Though many chronicles claim to describe history "from the earliest times" (from Brutus, from the creation, ab urbe condita), they are normally only useful as historical sources for their own times. Some of the later works, such as Polydore Vergil and Thomas More, are as close to history in the modern sense of the word, as to medieval chronicles.

== William I (1066–1087), and William II (1087–1100) ==
- Anglo-Saxon Chronicle (–1154)
- Eadmer (–1122)
- Gesta Herwardi (1070–1071)
- Guy of Amiens (1066)
- William of Malmesbury (–1127)
- Ordericus Vitalis (–1141)
- Roman de Rou (–1106)
- William of Jumièges (–1137)
- William of Poitiers (–1068)
- Florence of Worcester (–1117)

== Henry I (1100–1135) ==
- Henry of Huntingdon (–1154)
- John of Hexham (1130–1154)
- Simeon of Durham (several)

== Stephen (1135–1154) ==
- Aelred of Rievaulx (several)
- Gervase of Canterbury (1100–1199)
- Gesta Stephani (1135–1154)
- John of Salisbury (several)
- William of Newburgh (1160–1198 with a continuation to 1298)
- Richard of Hexham (several)
- Robert of Torigni (–1186)

== Henry II (1154–1189) ==
- Chronicle of Melrose (–1270)
- The Deeds of the Normans in Ireland (Song of Dermot and the Earl) (–1175)
- Ralph de Diceto (several)
- Stephen of Rouen (–1169)
- Jordan Fantosme (1173–1174)
- Geoffroy of Vigeois (–1184)
- Gesta Regis Henrici II (1169–1192)
- Gerald of Wales (several)
- L'Histoire de Guillaume le Marechal (c. 1140–1219)
- Rigord (1179–1208)

== Richard I, the Lionheart (1189–1199) ==
- Ambroise (1190–1192)
- Itinerarium Regis Ricardi (1190–1192)
- Ralph of Coggeshall (1066–1223)
- Richard of Devizes (1189–1192)
- Roger of Howden (–1201)

== John of England (1199–1216) ==
- Walter of Coventry (–1225)
- Roger of Wendover (–1235)
- William the Breton (See Rigord, above)

== Henry III (1216–1272) ==
- Chronicle of Lanercost (1201–1346)
- Arnold Fitz Thedmar (1188–1274)
- Flores Historiarum (–1326)
- Matthew Paris (–1259)
- Richard de Morins (–1297)
- William Rishanger (1259–1307)
- Robert of Gloucester (–1270)
- Thomas Wykes (1066–1289)

== Edward I (1272–1307) ==
- The Brus (1286–1332)
- Chronica Johannis de Oxenedes (c. 1290)
- John of Fordun (–1383)
- Guisborough (1048–1346)
- Pierre de Langtoft (–1307)
- Nicholas Trevet (1135–1307)

== Edward II (1307–1327) ==
- Annales Paulini (–1307 with continuation to 1341)
- Geoffrey the Baker (1303–1356)
- Polychronicon (–1352)
- Scalacronica (1066–1362)
- John of Trokelowe (1307–1326)
- Vita Edwardi Secundi (1307–1326)

== Edward III (1327–1377) ==
- Jean Froissart (1307–1400)
- Herald of Chandos
- Henry Knighton (1066–1395 with a gap 1366–1377)
- Jean Le Bel (1272–1361 poor until 1326)
- Adam Murimuth (1303–1347)
- Jean de Venette (1340–1368)

== Richard II (1377–1399) and Henry IV (1399–1413) ==
- Jean Creton (most valuable for 1399)
- Enguerrand de Monstrelet (1400–1444)
- Adam of Usk (1377–1404)
- The Westminster Chronicle (1381–1394)
- Thomas Walsingham (several, among these The St Albans Chronicle)

== Henry V (1413–1422) ==
- John Capgrave (–1417)
- Thomas Elmham (see Henrici V Gesta below)
- Jean Le Fevre (1408–1435)

== Henry VI (1422–1461 and 1470–1471) ==
- Croyland Chronicle (1149–1486)
- John Hardyng (–1437)
- Gregory's Chronicle (1189–1469)
- A Short English Chronicle (1189–1465)
- Jean de Wavrin (–1471)
- William Worcester (1324–1468, 1491)

== Edward IV (1461–1470 and 1471–1483) ==
- John Hardyng (–1464)
- Philippe de Commynes (1464–1498)
- Robert Fabyan (–1485)
- Historie of the arrivall of Edward IV (1471)
- Warkworth's Chronicle (1461–1474)

== Richard III (1483–1485) ==
- Dominic Mancini (1483)
- John Rous (–1485)

== Henry VII (1485-1509) ==
- Thomas More's History of King Richard III (1452–1485)

== Henry VIII (1509-1547) ==
- Edward Hall's Union of the Two Noble and Illustre Families of Lancastre and Yorke (1399–1547)
- Polydore Vergil's Anglica Historia (1538)

== See also ==
- English historians in the Middle Ages
