= A Short English Chronicle =

Late medieval English chronicle

- Lambeth Palace Library, MS 306
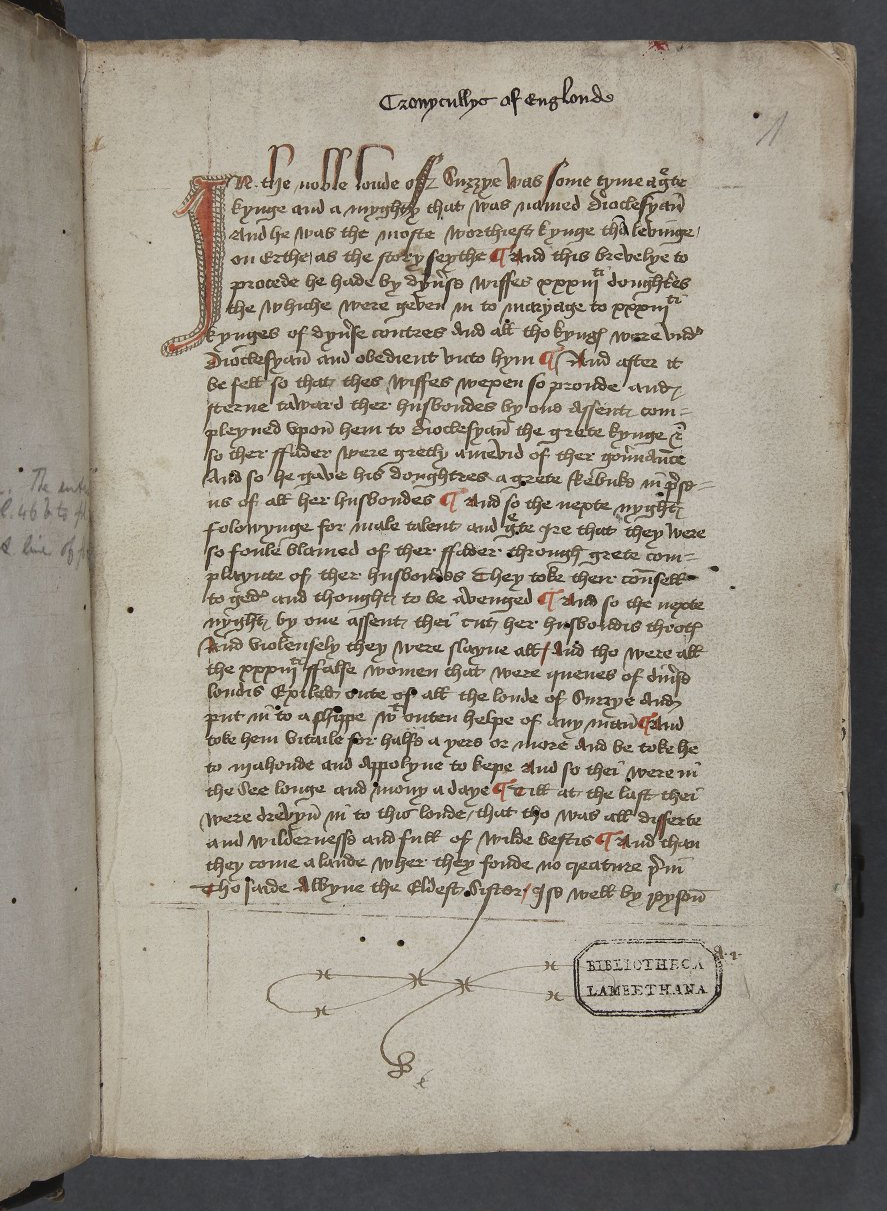
- The first page of A Short Chronicle of England. (Note: Titled Cronycullys of Englonde, the first sentence, in a 15th-century hand, reads "IN the noble londe of Surrye was some tyme a greate kynge and a myghty that was named Dioclesyan, and he was the moste worthiest kynge than levinge on erthe, as the story seythe". In this context, "Surrye" is not referring to the English county, but the country Syria, in the medieval phonetic spelling.)
- Also known as: Short English Chronicle
- Type: Chronicle
- Date: 1464
- Place of origin: London, England
- Size: 80 leaves
- Format: Double columns
- Contents: English mythology, verse on the history of the kings of England, chronicle narrative of the years 1422–1465
- Additions: Comments by John Stow
- Previously kept: John Stow in 16th century
- Discovered: James Gairdner in 1880

A Short English Chronicle (also Short English Chronicle) is a chronicle produced in England in the first half of the 15th century. It is currently held in Lambeth Palace Library, and although it begins its coverage in 1189, its content is thin until it reaches 1422. It covers the years from then until 1464 (the year in which it is thought to have been created) in greater depth, ending with the marriage of the Yorkist King Edward IV to Elizabeth Woodville and the capture of the deposed Lancastrian King, Henry VI. It is one of a number of chronicles and writings emitting from London in the early 15th century, and it presents national political events from a London perspective.

The chronicle was first published in 1880 by James Gairdner and has remained a source for historians into the 20th century, generally more for what it tells them regarding the creation and use of chronicles than its historiographical value. Gairdner suggested that while it was severely lacking in the first few hundred years of its chronology, the details Short Chronicle provided on the reigns of Henry and Edward made it useful.

== Manuscript ==
The manuscript is held in Lambeth Palace Library as MS 306, although other, often more fragmentary copies, exist in other manuscripts. It is written in English in the neat professional style of a 15th-century scribe. It is structured in three parts. The first section briefly relates ancient English mythology—probably from a Brut-style chronicle—the second, linking section, contains mangled verse based on John Lydgate's history of the kings of England; (Note: This was originally written by Lydgate for King Henry VI, sometime between his accession in 1422 and coronation in 1430. Linn Mooney has described how Lydgate "assigns a rhyme royal stanza to each king from William the Conqueror to Henry VI, for a total of 105 lines. Whether for political or other reasons, it seems to have been enormously popular: the text survives in thirty-six manuscripts, thirty-two of the fifteenth century, three of the sixteenth, and one of the seventeenth".) and the third is the chronicle narrative proper.

=== Gairdner's publication ===
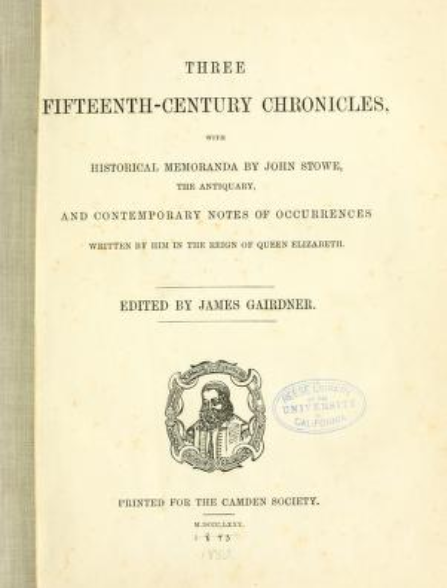
Title page of James Gairdner's Three Fifteenth-Century Chronicles, in which the Short English Chronicle was published in 1880.

The chronicle's author originally titled it Cronycullys of Englonde; who the author was, though, remains unknown. The name A Short English Chronicle was first bestowed upon it by the historian James Gairdner, when he published it as part of his Three English Chronicles collection, published by the Selden Society in 1880.

=== Description ===
Scholars consider the Short English Chronicle to be what they term a dead chronicle, as it ceases at a definite point with no later continuation, (Note: The other form of chronicle is a live one. Antonia Gransden describes the differences between the two thus: "'Dead' chronicles were compiled by one man from earlier chronicles and histories...'Living' chronicles were composed by one man until his own time and then continued, altered and interpolated by him and/or by others. They were not regarded as complete, like literary works".) although the last two (unused) pages in the book have been prepared with ruled lines. McLaren suggests that this may indicate that whoever compiled the chronicle was willing for it to be somehow later continued, and, indeed, John Stow used some of this space for his own commentary. Gairdner describes the manuscript in Lambeth Palace in his introduction to the published piece. It is, he says, "a stout folio volume" composed of 80 leaves.

Physically, the book has a Tudor period-ornamental binding—itself "very much worm-eaten"—made of wood. This, in turn, is covered by leather, although the back has been replaced more recently than the front. There were once book clasps holding the tome together, but these have both long-since disappeared. One of the covers, says Gairdner, still possesses the brass nails that once held the clasp embedded within it, while the other possesses some of the clasps' ornamental fittings. The leather covers are imprinted with decorative lozenge shapes—"filled with foliated ornaments and a framework parallel with the edges"—and the Beaufort family's coat of arms is prominent. By the mid-16th century, it had come into the possession of the antiquarian John Stow, who added many of his own comments to the manuscript, although in the event Stow hardly used it as a source for his own monograph—the 1598 Survey of London—as he had most of his material from elsewhere.

=== Relationship to other chronicles ===
There were, over the course of the 15th century, "hundreds" of chronicles written in London. Since they were all written anonymously, it is impossible to discern the motivation of their authors in creating them.

== Origins ==
Based on the fact that all three of the chronicle's sections are written in the same scribal hand, the historian Mary-Rose McLaren has posited that it was composed by either a single individual or possibly a workshop. It was probably the result of a specific commission; less likely, she says, is that it was created by the author for his own personal use. It may have its origins in the City of London's own chronicle, as, until it reaches the year 1446, it follows the events recorded in the latter closely, consisting mainly of lists of bailiffs and keepers of the City, and then mayors and sheriffs, although the Short Chronicle omits, confuses and transposes a number of early 13th-century sheriffs and subsequently falls behind. Thompson suggests that it "adds heavily to the meagre outlines" laid out in William Worcester's chronicle. The Short Chronicle was not alone in this: all the chronicles which came out of London in this period were built around "an inflexible, historical spine, their listed succession of chief city officials". It also borrows heavily from the Brut Chronicle in its early sections. There were multiple chronicles written in London in the early 15th century, and, while they probably shared a now unknown common source, they did not copy directly from each other. This meant that including the Short Chronicle, they generally provide much the same detail—and a low level of it—in their treatment of reigns and events up until around 1377. With the accession of Richard II of England, comments McLaren, they "begin to deviate wildly", and the Lambeth MS particularly begins to provide fuller descriptors. In 1435, it becomes even more expansive.

The mythological section of the chronicle has generally not been considered historiographically useful by historians: Gairdner wrote that the portion was "absolutely destitute of historical value" (Note: At the point Gairdner was writing, however, the Brut itself had still to be transcribed and published, and so he suggested that—since it was therefore unavailable "to all but students of black letter and readers of mediæval MSS"—what little was contained in the Short chronicle may still be of use to interested parties.) and in the early-20th century, Charles Lethbridge Kingsford commented that in abridging the Brut as he did, the author of the Short Chronicle omitted "almost all that was of peculiar interest". From that point the chronicle develops individuality and detail in its descriptions of events, although Kingsford notes that all the surviving copies that he knew of missed out a couple of years, not re-commencing until 1450, beginning "This yere the Kynge helde his Parlement at Westmester. And that same yere was all Normande lost". The main prose of the chronicle is written in a 15th-century hand, but marginalia and, more rarely, factual corrections, have been added in a hand dating from the reign of King Henry VII. Gairdner suggests the binding's Tudor provenance due to the fact that the hand that has added the marginalia has also added further chronological dates and events from Henry VII's reign after the paper had been cut by the book binder.

== Content ==
Although written in the 15th century, it begins with the accession of King Richard I of England in 1189, and stops in the middle of King Edward IV's first reign in 1465. It also contains a number of receipts for medical products (Note: The contemporary Gregory's Chronicle was structured in a similar manner, and also contained random items not connected to the Chronicle itself (for example, poems and health advice).) and pieces of verse; although these are, comments Flenley, of "varying length and merit". The oldest portion of the original 15th-century manuscript still extant in the 20th century covers the years 1417–1420; everything else that is known comes from Stow's own transcripts. (Note: Says Levy: "It is evident from Kingsford's work that Stow copied whatever he could not purchase, and frequently the only surviving text of some chronicle or document is Stow's transcript. Substantial fragments of Stow's collections have survived" and it is these—such as Gairdner's Short Chronicle—that have since been published.) Beginning with Diocletian—described as King of Syria—the first 17 leaves cover English history up to the Norman Conquest. Leaves 17 through to 31 list successive English monarchs from William the Conqueror to King Henry VI. The historical narrative continues with the reigns of Kings Richard I and his brother John (between 1189 and 1215) up to leaf 38, from there to 47 is covered the reigns of Edward I, II and III (1272–1377). King Richard II continues for the next four leaves, taking the story up until his deposition in 1399 and the accession of the first Lancastrian King, Henry IV whose reign until 1412 covers the next three leaves. The reign of Henry V is between leaves 54-58, until his death in 1422. This is followed by his son, Henry VI, which is also the longest section, covering 20 leaves. The last two leaves of the narrative cover the first four years of King Edward IV.

This yere [1464] there was a grete frost and grete snowne, where thorowe mych cattell of bestis and shepe for fawte of mete were distroyed. Also this yere the kynge spoused the duches doughter of Bedford, þewhiche was crowned at Westmester the Sonday a for Wytsonday, that is to sey, the xxvi day of Maye, att the whiche coronacion was made xlvij Knyghtes of the Bathe, where of were foure men of London, þat is to sey, Rauffe Josselynge, draper, that tyme beynge maire, Hugh Wiche, mercer, John Plomer, grocer, Harry Waffer, draper. Also this same yere Kynge Harry was taken in the northe contre... (Note: The chronicler's last entry. Here he describes, in succession, poor weather which led to the destruction of much livestock, King Edward's marriage to Elizabeth, daughter of Jacquetta, Duchess of Bedford on 26 May 1464. Here he notes that 47 men were made Knights of the Bath, four of them Londoners, including the Mayor, Ralph Josselyn. He concludes by commenting how, soon after, the deposed Henry VI was captured in the "north contre".)

— A Short Chronicle of England, c. 1464

The chronicle is at its most detailed regarding the 15th century, particularly Jack Cade's Rebellion and the accession of Edward IV; Gairdner suggested that this portion of the chronicle was an "original and independent authority" for the period 1422 to about 1465, with King Edward's clandestine marriage to Elizabeth Woodville being the last event it covers. Alexander L. Kaufman has also suggested that this indicates that the compiler was contemporaneous. (Note: Indeed, Ralph Flenley speculated that the author—who is presumed to have been a citizen of London—may even have been part of the Londoners' attempt to repel Cade's army from London Bridge on the night of 5 July. Mary-Rose McLaren, in a 2002 study of medieval London chronicles has demonstrated that eyewitness testimony often provided the basis for later manuscripts.)

The post-1399 versions are notable for their clear pro-Lancastrian bias and focus on King Henry V's victories in France, for example at Rouen, for the purposes of propaganda. However, there is still much of legendary material, such as that of Albina; indeed, the historian Clair Valente has described it as "enthusiastic" in its rendition of these aspects of English history; she has also called it "one of the best records of rumours and propaganda, if not of the event themselves." The chronicle is less detailed on individuals. The historian Patricia-Ann Lee has commented on how even the Queen is treated "perfunctorily", although also notes that it does take part in laying the foundations for her future stereotyping in the 1450s.

Kaufman has also commented upon the similarities of the text in the Short English Chronicle and MS Gough 10 at the Bodleian Library, as they both "present fairly objective" and "methodically written" chronologies of summer 1450. It is one of many 15th-century chronicles that "dwell on...narratives of treason". The historian Roger Nicholson has suggested that this is not only because chroniclers had an inherent desire to write about evildoers and their acts, but that, in their writings, treason "often seems an index of a more general disorder". Either way, he says, it is ranked alongside poor weather and concomitant failed harvests in the social significance chroniclers bestowed upon it. McLaren has argued that, to authors such as that of the Short English Chronicle—who dwelt on a great rain that occurred in 1367 in some detail—"if the perceived battle between order and disorder can be expressed in the actions of individuals, it is also present in the London chroniclers' accounts of weather, particularly rains."

=== Audience ===
The 14th century witnessed a decline in monastic chroniclers, and by the following century there were few monasteries in England—or the rest of Europe—producing the quality and quantity of work that the heyday of monastic writing had seen in the 12th and 13th centuries. There was, however, a growth in popular demand for literature written in the vernacular; as the historian A. R. Myers put it, by laymen for laymen. And, since it only took "one literate person to make a text available to an entire household", a chronicle's circulation could have ultimately been broad. London, being closer to the royal court and the biggest mercantile centre in the country, was naturally well-suited to become a centre of literary patronage and production. (Note: Indeed, comments the palaeographic scholar Ralph Hanna, it could be argued that London had held this position since the reign of Henry III and Arnold FitzThedmar and his Chronica Maiorum et Vicecomitum of 1274.) As a result, many works—like the Short Chronicle—had a London-centric perspective. This did not mean that they ignored events around the country; on the contrary, says Nicholson, London chronicles provided a "national, central stage" for events which had taken place outside of London but ended up inside London. For example, the execution of Aubrey de Vere—son of the Lancastrian Earl of Oxford—whose final journey began in Westminster Palace but finished on Tower Green, and was thus described in great detail in the Short Chronicle.

=== Major events chronicled ===
Major events—particularly in the reigns of Henry VI and Edward IV—are chronicled within the Short Chronicle.

The executions of Aubrey de Vere and his father in 1462 are treated as examples of how the new King—sent from God to win his crown in battle—was given instant knowledge of their treason ("the whiche tresonnes God sent the kynge himself knowleche"), and Nicholson suggests that the chronicler is demonstrating the extent of the King's power.

The Battle of Wakefield on 30 December 1460, which saw the death of Richard, Duke of York and the destruction of his army was suggested to be not a deliberate counter-offensive to the Lancastrian Queen, Margaret of Anjou, but the result of an ambush; the royal army "lay in her wey at Wakefelde to stope hem... [intending to] slowe the Duke of Yorke"; the chronicle may be suggesting that it was less of a battle—knowingly entered into—and more of an ambush. (Note: McLaren also notes, vis-à-vis the Short Chronicle's clear Yorkist partisanship, that the chronicler also uses the adjective "slowe" to "describe death in lawless conditions", and that this was a "deliberate ambiguity".) Likewise, the Chronicle barely discusses the two sides' next encounter the following year at the Battle of St Albans, but the author does dwell floridly on the march of the Queen's army south (having "reysed all the northe and all other pepull by the wey"), in which southern towns such as Peterborough and Grantham were sacked ("compelled, dispoyled, rubbed and distroyed all maner of catell vertayll and riches") by the northern army.
