= Henry Thomas Riley =

British translator, lexicographer and antiquary (1816–1878)

Henry Thomas Riley (June 1816 – 14 April 1878) was an English translator, lexicographer, and antiquary.

== Life ==
Born in June 1816, he was only son of Henry Riley of Southwark, an ironmonger. He was educated at Chatham House, Ramsgate, and at Charterhouse School (1832–4). He entered Trinity College, Cambridge, but at the end of his first term migrated to Clare College where he was admitted on 17 December 1834, and elected a scholar on 24 January 1835. In 1838 he obtained a Latin essay prize. He graduated with a B.A. in 1840 and M.A. in 1859, after which he moved to Corpus Christi College, Cambridge. On 16 June 1870 he was incorporated at Exeter College, Oxford.

Riley was called to the bar at the Inner Temple on 23 November 1847, but early in life he began hack work for booksellers to make a living, by editing and translation. On the creation of the Historical Manuscripts Commission (by royal charter in April 1869), Riley was engaged as an additional inspector for England, and given the task of examining the archives of various municipal corporations, the muniments of the colleges at Oxford and Cambridge, and the documents in the registries of various bishops and chapters.

Riley died at Hainault House, the Crescent, Selhurst, Croydon, on 14 April 1878, aged 61.

== Works ==
For Bohn's Classical Library, Riley translated:

- the complete works of Ovid (the Metamorphoses, 1851, the Fasti, Tristia, &c., 1851, and the Heroides, 1852)
- the comedies of Plautus (1852, 2 vols.)
- the Pharsalia of Lucan (1853)
- the comedies of Terence and the fables of Phædrus (1853)
- (with John Bostock) the Natural History of Pliny the elder (1855–7, 6 vols.)

His Dictionary of Latin Quotations (1856 and 1860), was included in the same series, and reprinted in 1866.

For Bohn's Antiquarian Library, he translated the Annals of Roger de Hoveden (1853, 2 vols.); and Ingulph's Chronicle of the Abbey of Croyland (1854).

For the Rolls Series, he edited the Munimenta Gildhallae Londoniensis, including the Liber Albus (1859), the Liber Custumarum (1860, in two parts), with a translation of the Anglo-Norman passages, and a glossary (1862); the Chronica Monasterii S. Albani, comprising the Annals of John Amundesham (1870 and 1871, 2 vols.); and a further set of the chronicles of St. Albans, in eleven volumes, including the works of Thomas Walsingham, John of Trokelowe, Henry de Blaneford, and William Rishanger, and the register of John Whethamstede.

Riley translated for the corporation of the city of London the Liber Albus (1861) and the Chronicles of the Mayors and Sheriffs of London, 1188–1274, from the Latin and Anglo-Norman of Arnald Fitz-Thedmar; with the French Chronicle of London, 1259–1343, from the Chroniques de London (1863). He also published in 1868 a volume entitled Memorials of London and London Life, a series of Extracts from the City Archives, 1276–1419.

Riley wrote in the Athenaeum, the Gentleman's Magazine, and the Archaeological Journal. He contributed to the eighth edition of the Encyclopaedia Britannica.
