= Clasp =

Clasp, clasper or CLASP may refer to:

- Book clasp, fastener for a book cover
- Folding clasp, a device used to close a watch strap
- Lobster clasp, fastener for jewellery
- Wrist clasp, a dressing accessory
- Medal bar, an element in military decoration
- Fastener, a hardware device that mechanically joins objects together
- "Clasp", a song by Jethro Tull from The Broadsword and the Beast
- Clasp, a Common Lisp implementation
- Clasper, an anatomical structure in male cartilaginous fish
- Clasper (mathematics), a surface (with extra structure) in a 3-manifold on which surgery can be performed
- Grasp, holding or seizing firmly with (or as if with) the hand

== Acronyms and initialisms ==
- Consortium of Local Authorities Special Programme, an association in England for the development of prefabricated school buildings
  - CLASP (British Rail), a prefabricated building system, derived from the same system, used by the Southern Region of British Rail
- Center for Law and Social Policy, an American organization, based Washington, D.C., that advocates for policies aimed at improving the lives of low-income people
- CLASP1 and CLASP2, cytoplasmic linker associated proteins
- Classic ASP, a nostalgic term for Active Server Pages in computing
- Collaborative Labeling and Appliance Standards Program, an international nonprofit organization
