= Brut Chronicle =

Collective name of medieval chronicles of history of Cymru/Wales

The Brut Chronicle, also known as the Prose Brut, is the collective name of a number of medieval chronicles of the history of England. The original Prose Brut was written in Anglo-Norman; it was subsequently translated into Latin and English.

The first Anglo-Norman versions end with the death of King Henry III in 1272; subsequent versions extend the narrative. Fifty versions in Anglo-Norman remain, in forty-nine manuscripts, in a variety of versions and stages. Latin translations of the Anglo-Norman versions remain in nineteen different versions, which fall into two main categories; some of those were subsequently translated into Middle English. There are no fewer than 184 versions of the English translation of the work in 181 medieval and post-medieval manuscripts, the highest number of manuscripts for any text in Middle English except for Wycliffe's Bible. The sheer number of copies that survive and its late-fourteenth century translation into the vernacular indicating the growth in common literacy; it is considered "central" to the literary culture of England in the Late Middle Ages.

As well as the Prose Brut there are also a number of Welsh versions of Geoffrey's Historia, collectively known as Brut y Brenhinedd.

== Origins and subsequent history ==
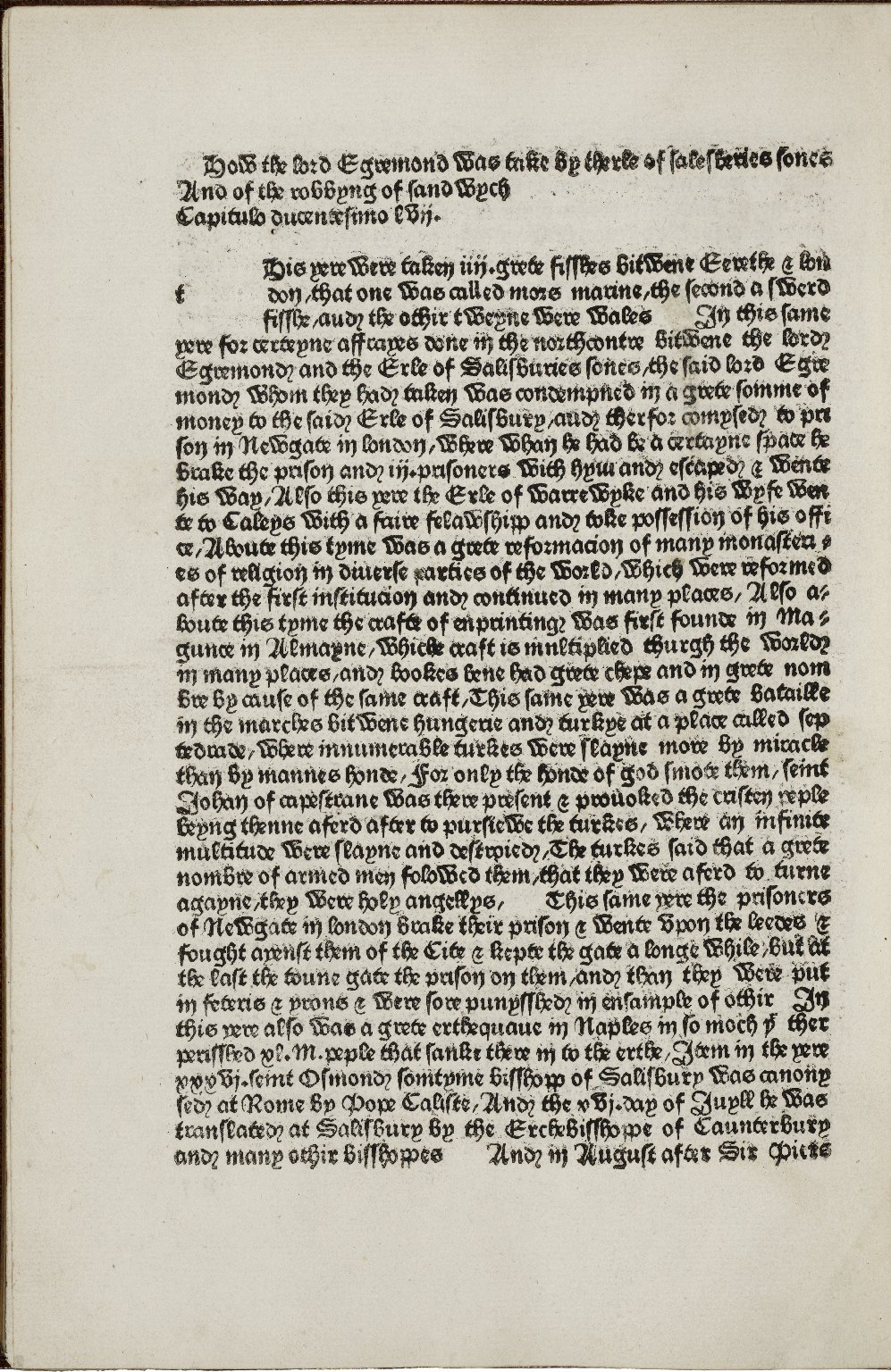
A page from Caxton's printing, describing the Percy-Neville feud of 1454

Originally a legendary chronicle written in Anglo-Norman in the thirteenth century (identified by the fact that some existing copies finish in 1272), the Brut described the settling of Britain by Brutus of Troy, son of Aeneas, and the reign of the Welsh Cadwalader. In this, it was itself based on Geoffrey of Monmouth's text from the previous century. It also covered the reigns of many kings later the subject of legend, including King Cole, King Leir (the subject of Shakespeare's play, King Lear), and King Arthur, and exists in both abridged and long versions. Early versions describe the country as being divided, both culturally and politically, by the River Humber, with the southern half described as "this side of the Humber" and "the better part". Having been written at a time of division between crown and nobility, it was "baronial in its sympathies". It was probably originally composed "at least in part" by clerks in the Royal chancery, although not as an official history. It later became a source for monastic chronicles. Popular already in its early incarnations, it may even have limited the circulation of rival contemporary histories.

The Brut underwent various revisions over the centuries, and from 1333 material inflected from a mid-thirteenth century poem, Des Grantz Geanz, describing the settlement of England (as Albion), had entered the main versions. Eventually, along with the Polychronicon, it was one of the most popular political and secular histories of fourteenth-century England, with the latest-known version ending with events from 1479.

English editions appeared from the early 15th century, particularly the so-called Long version and its various continuations. This has become known as the "Common" version, and was probably transcribed in Herefordshire. A later fifteenth-century version consists of the Common versions with "a major one" concluding in 1419, occasionally with the addition of prologues and epilogues. The 16th century also saw an abridged version, created from the major fifteenth-century copies.

=== Audience ===
It was primarily of interest to the upper-gentry and the English nobility, but, the more it got added to and altered, so it became noticed by other sectors of society. Firstly the clergy, for whom it was translated into Latin, and then into the more accessible French and then English for the lower gentry and mercantile classes. It was thus available to much of English society; certainly, as Andrea Ruddock has said, to the entire political class. And, since it only took "one literate person to make a text available to an entire household", its circulation could have been even broader. Similarly, there are vast differences in the quality of the surviving manuscripts, and Julia Marvin has suggested that this reflects their "diverse ownership and readership". It has been described as "a tremendous success", and one of the most-copied chronicles of the thirteenth and fourteenth centuries. A version produced in York in the later fourteenth century was based on official contemporary records, and contains, for example, an eye-witness account of the Good Parliament of 1376. The post-1399 versions are notable by their clear pro-Lancastrian bias and focus on King Henry V's victories in France, for example at Rouen, for the purposes of propaganda. However, even these later versions still contained much of the earlier legendary material, such as that of Albina; indeed, the prose versions have been described as being "enthusiastic" in its rendition of these aspects of English history. It has also been described as "one of the best records of rumours and propaganda, if not of the event themselves."

== Medieval publication history ==
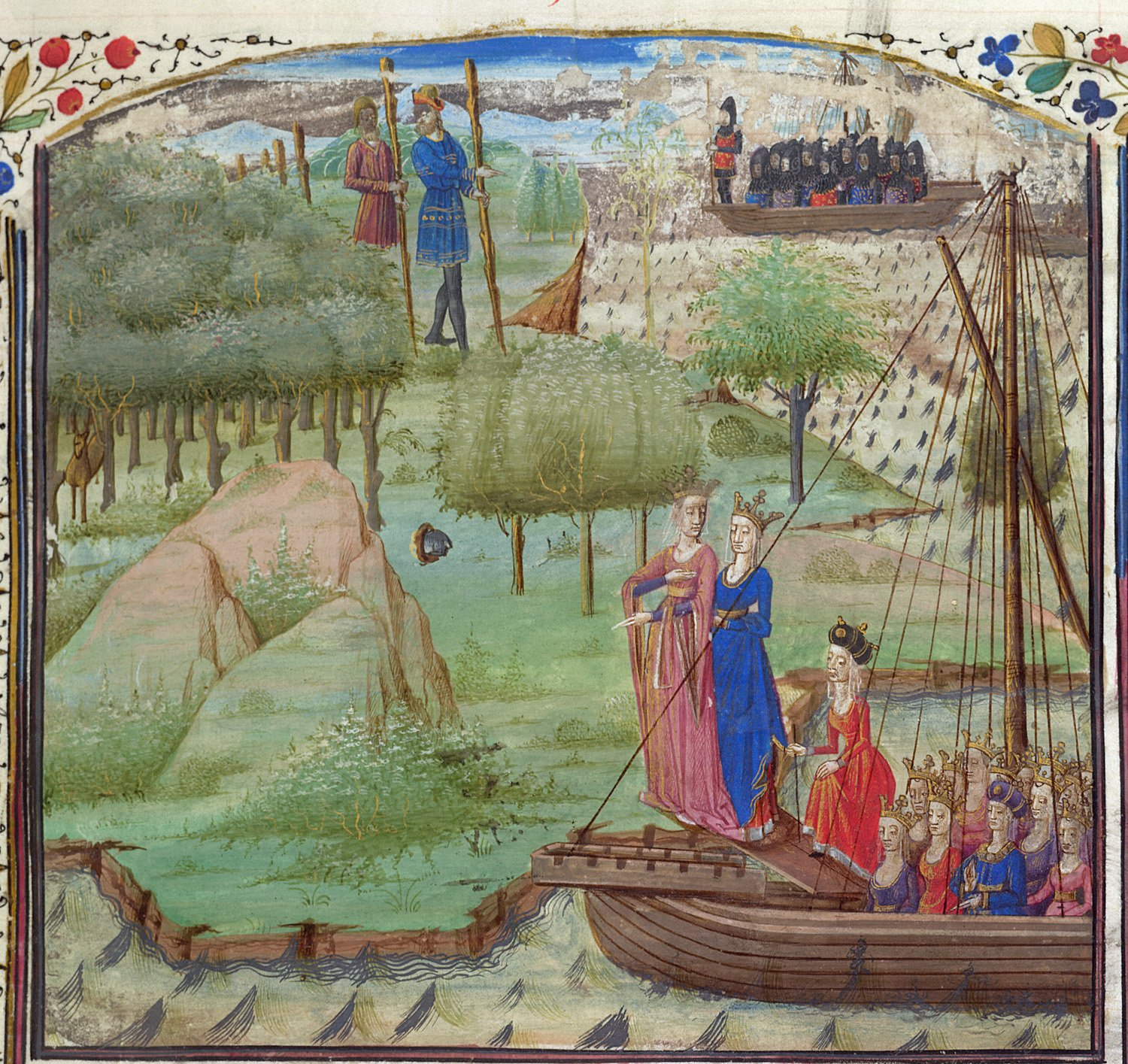
French version of the Prose Brut from the mid-to-late 15th century; Albina and other daughters of Diodicias disembarking from a ship in Britain, with two giants and Brutus and his followers arriving in another ship.

There are fifty versions in Anglo-Norman, in forty-nine manuscripts, in various versions and stages. There are Latin translations of the Anglo-Norman versions in nineteen different versions, which fall into two main categories; some of those were subsequently translated into Middle English. There are no fewer than 184 versions of the English translation of the work in 181 medieval and post-medieval manuscripts, the highest number of manuscripts for any text in Middle English except for Wycliffe's Bible. From the fifteenth century there is "an amorphous, heterogenous group" of texts which are composed of individuals' notes and preliminary workings of various areas of the Brut. The English edition made it the first chronicle to be written in the vernacular since the ninth-century Anglo-Saxon Chronicle.

After the "massive scribal activity" that produced over 250 extant manuscripts (a "vast number for a medieval text"), the Brut was the first chronicle printed in England. The Brut was one of William Caxton's first printings, and he may have compiled this version himself. Between 1480, when Caxton printed it as the Chronicles of England, and 1528 it went through thirteen editions. As a result, according to Matheson, "it is no exaggeration to say that in the late Middle Ages in England the Brut was the standard historical account of British and English history".

Tudor historians such as John Stow, Raphael Holinshed, and Edward Hall relied extensively on the Brut, and so, by extension, did William Shakespeare.

=== Anglo-Norman versions ===
The Anglo-Norman text was initially intended for a lay audience of the upper class. Likely and certain owners of versions of the Brut included Guy de Beauchamp, 10th Earl of Warwick, Henry de Lacy, 3rd Earl of Lincoln, Isabella of France (who gave a copy to her son, Edward III of England), and Thomas Ughtred, 1st Baron Ughtred (in his will he left it to his wife). Copies were also listed in the library catalogues of religious houses – Fountains Abbey, Hailes Abbey, Clerkenwell Priory, and St Mary's Abbey, York (which had two copies). Matheson lists five manuscripts of continental provenance, produced in France, Flanders, and Lorraine.

=== Middle English versions ===
Outside the traditional lay, upper-class audience, the reach of the Middle English translations of the Brut extended the audience to the merchant class. Landowning gentry with a Middle English copy of the Brut include John Sulyard's father, who passed it on to Henry Bourchier, 2nd Earl of Essex's son Thomas. John Warkworth of Peterhouse, Cambridge, owned a copy (which included the 'Warkworth's' Chronicle, named for him), as did the religious houses St Bartholomew-the-Great and Dartford Priory, among others. Matheson identifies a number of women owners and readers as well: Isabel Alen (niece of vicar William Trouthe), Alice Brice, Elizabeth Dawbne, and Dorothy Helbartun.

== Historiography and publication ==
The Brut's significance is now seen as being in the fact that it was written by laymen, for laymen, and also that the latter portion, at least, was one of the first chronicles written in the English language; it also occasionally provides historical details not found in other contemporaries' writings. The Brut owned by the Mortimer family in the late fourteenth-century contained their view of their own genealogy (which they also traced back to King Arthur and Brutus).

The first scholarly edition of the later-medieval portion was transcribed and edited by J.S. Davies for the Camden Society in 1856, and in 1879 James Gairdner published parts of it relating to the Hundred Years' War in his Historical Recollections of a London Citizen. In 1905, C.S.L. Kingsford published three versions in his Chronicles of London, and the following year F.W.D. Brie published a list of all extant manuscripts in his The Brute of England or The Chronicles of England.

== See also ==
- Gregory's Chronicle
- A Short English Chronicle

== Bibliography ==
- Brie, F.W.D. (1906). The Brut of England or The Chronicles of England. London.
- Gransden, Antonia (2013). Historical Writing in England: c.550 – c.1307. Routledge. pp. 1–. ISBN 978-1-136-19021-6.
- Kaufman, Alexander L. (2016). "'And Many Oþer Diuerse Tokens...': Portents and Wonders in 'Warkworth's' Chronicle". In Rajsic, Jaclyn; Kooper, Erik; Hoche, Dominique (eds.). The Prose Brut and Other Late Medieval Chronicles: Books Have Their Histories. Essays in Honour of Lister M. Matheson. York: York Medieval Press. pp. 49–63. ISBN 9781903153666.
- Kennedy, Edward Donald (January 1999). "Romancing the Past: A Medieval English Perspective". In Kooper, Erik (ed.). The Medieval Chronicle: Proceedings of the 1st International Conference on the Medieval Chronicle. Rodopi. pp. 13–39. ISBN 90-420-0576-9.
- King, Andy; Marvin, Julia (January 2008). "A Warning to the Incurious: M. R. James, the Scalacronica and the Anglo-Norman prose Brut Chronicle". In Kooper, Erik (ed.). The Medieval Chronicle V. Rodopi. pp. 129–46. ISBN 978-90-420-2354-3.
- Marvin, Julia (2005). "Author Authorized: The Prophecies of the Prose Brut Chronicle". In Busby, Keith; Dalrymple, Roger (eds.). Arthurian Literature XXII. DS Brewer. pp. 84–99. ISBN 978-1-84384-062-6.
- Marvin, Julia (1 April 2013). Burton, Janet; Schofield, Phillipp; Weiler, Bjö (eds.). Thirteenth Century England XIV: Proceedings of the Aberystwyth and Lampeter Conference, 2011. Boydell Press. pp. 169–82. ISBN 978-1-84383-809-8.
- Matheson, Lister M. (1998). The Prose Brut: The Development of a Middle English Chronicle. Vol. 180. Tempe, Arizona: Medieval & Renaissance Texts & Studies. ISBN 0866982221.
- Myers, Alec Reginald (1996). English historical documents. 4. [Late medieval]. 1327 – 1485. Psychology Press. ISBN 978-0-415-60467-3.
- Ruddick, Andrea (2013). English Identity and Political Culture in the Fourteenth Century. Cambridge University Press. ISBN 978-1-107-00726-0.
- Spence, John (2013). Reimagining History in Anglo-Norman Prose Chronicles. Boydell & Brewer Ltd. ISBN 978-1-903153-45-1.
- Taylor, John (1987). English historical literature in the fourteenth century. Clarendon Press. ISBN 9780198200659.
- Valente, C. (1998). "The Deposition and Abdication of Edward II". The English Historical Review. 113 (453): 852–881. doi:10.1093/ehr/CXIII.453.852. OCLC 2207424.
