= St Albans chronicler =

The St Albans chronicler is a title which may refer to several notable people, including:

- Matthew Paris (c. 1200–1259)
- John of Trokelowe (fl. 1294)
- Thomas Walsingham (died c. 1422)

== See also ==
- St Albans Abbey
