= Droitwich Austin Friars =

Droitwich Austin Friars was located in the area now known as the Vines. It was established in 1331, when a plot of 300 square feet was given to build an oratory and habitation.

== Dissolution ==
The most information available about the establishment comes from the period of the dissolution. James Gairdner gives an account of the Bishop of Dover's examination of various friaries including Droitwich. Its property was disposed of by 1543.

== Sources ==
- Willis-Bund, J W; Page, William, eds. (1971). "Friaries: Austin friars, Droitwich". A History of the County of Worcester: Volume 2. London: British History Online. pp. 173–175.
- Willis-Bund, John William; Doubleday, Herbert Arthur; Page, William, eds. (1913). "The borough of Droitwich: Manors, churches and charities". A History of the County of Worcester: Volume 3. London: British History Online. pp. 81–90.
- Gairdner, James (1908), Lollardy and the Reformation in England, London: Macmillan, LCCN 08034724, OCLC 1462578, OL 7002880M
