= Coat of arms of Puerto Rico =

Versions
- Variant
- Armiger: Estado Libre Asociado de Puerto Rico (Commonwealth of Puerto Rico)
- Adopted: 1511
- Motto: Joannes Est Nomen Eius (Latin) ('John is his name')

The coat of arms of Puerto Rico was first granted by the Spanish Crown on November 8, 1511, making it the oldest heraldic achievement in use in the Americas. The territory was seized from Spain and ceded to the United States as a result of the Treaty of Paris that put an end to the Spanish–American War in 1899, after which two interim arms were adopted briefly. A law was passed in 1905 that reestablished the historical armorial bearings as the arms of the territory. Then in 1976, after numerous investigations and amendments, the current version was adopted.

== History ==
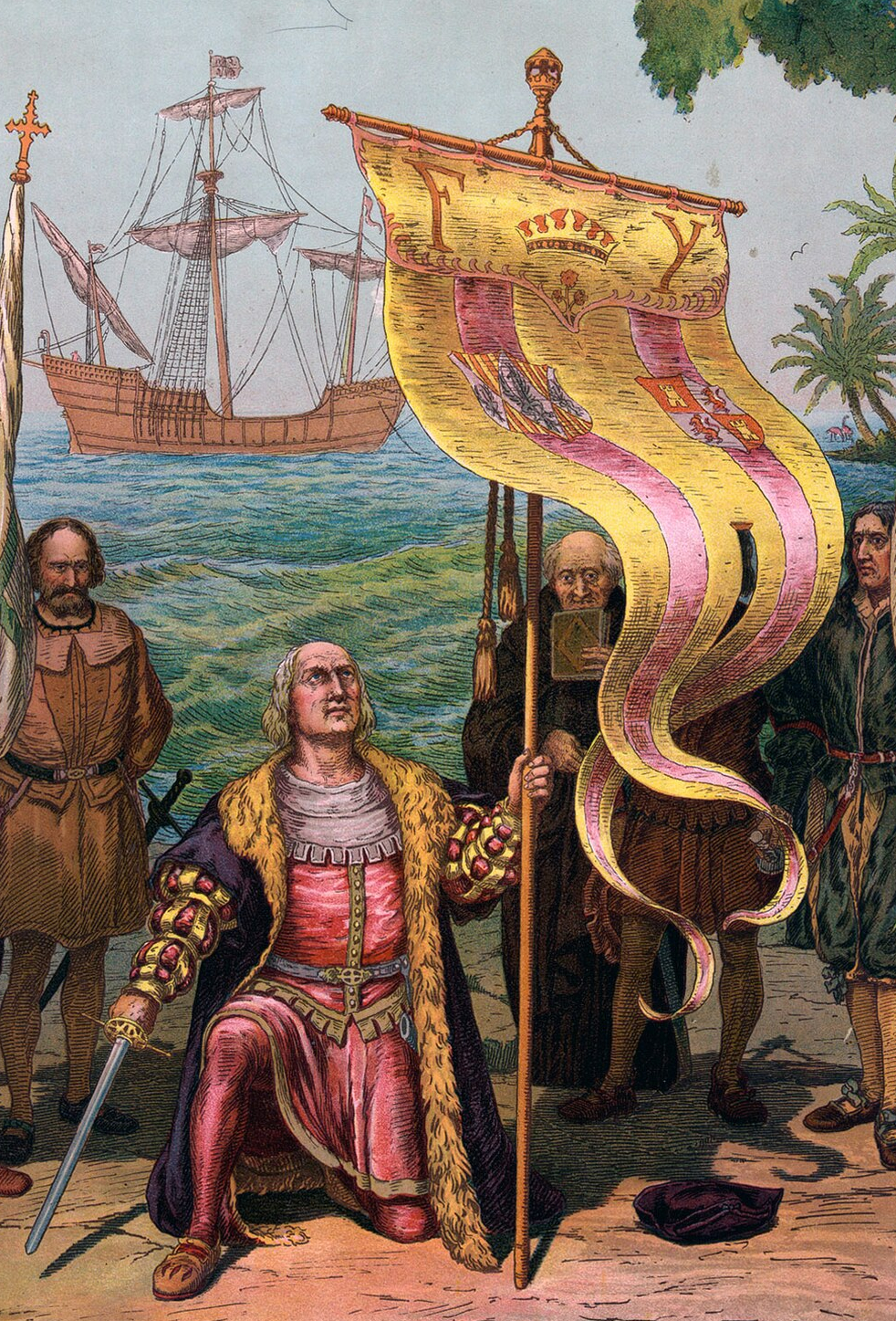
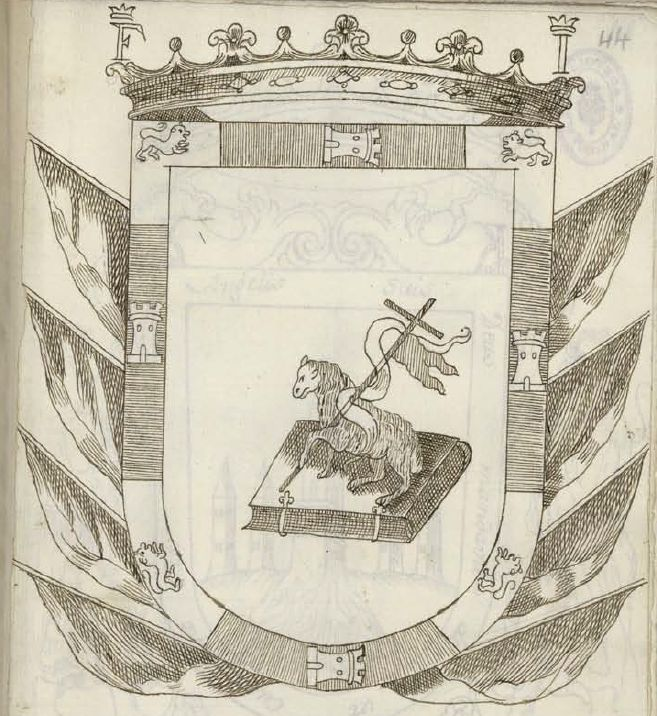
On the left, Christopher Columbus carrying a banner with the initials of Ferdinand II and Isabella I. On the right, an 18th century illustration of Puerto Rico's coat of arms.

The main element of the coat of arms of Puerto Rico is the Lamb of God. Despite Puerto Rico being a US territory, the shield continues to have elements reminiscent of Spain's presence in the New World. There have been different variations of the coat of arms throughout Puerto Rico's history. On March 1, 1902, a new coat of arms was approved by Governor William H. Hunt with the intention of reflecting the United States’ involvement in Puerto Rico. This was the coat of arms that became the substitute for the oldest heraldic achievement in use in the Americas. This coat of arms was referred to as the “Escudo Intruso” (Intruder Coat of Arms or Intruding Coat of Arms) by the Puerto Rican people. Governor Regis H. Post re-introduced the historical coat of arms which includes the lamb on March 9, 1905. The current version was officially readopted by the government of Puerto Rico on June 3, 1976.

1767	1873-74	1902-1905	1905	1976–present
1767 Design	First Spanish Republic	"Americanized" coat of arms	Reintroduction of the historical arms	Corrected coat of arms

== Features ==
Heraldic Symbols

Arms	Meaning
	Lamb of God with Cross Flag: Traditional symbol associated with Saint John as the apostle is known for pointing to Jesus and declaring: "Behold the Lamb of God who takes away the sin of the world" (John 1:29). The island was originally called "San Juan Bautista" (Saint John the Baptist) and the capital city Puerto Rico (Rich Port). Eventually the names swapped, the island bearing the name of Puerto Rico and the capital of San Juan. Hence why the main symbol of the arms of Puerto Rico alludes to the original name of the island: "San Juan Bautista" (Saint John the Baptist).
	Book of Revelation: Attributed to John of Patmos, the Book of Revelation is represented by a book with seven seals on which the lamb sits.
	Ferdinand II of Aragon: The gold-crowned F and the arrows (Spanish: flechas) represent Ferdinand II of Aragon.
	Isabella I of Castile: The gold-crowned the Y and the yoke (Spanish: yugo) represent Ysabel, i.e., Isabella I of Castile.

Border Shields

Arms	Meaning
	Cross of Jerusalem: Symbol of the Kingdom of Jerusalem, whose succession rights passed to the Kingdom of Sicily, and henceforth to the Spanish Crown.
	Kingdom of Castille: Arms of the Kingdom of Castile.
	Kingdom of León: Arms of the Kingdom of León.
	Crown of Castile and León: Flag of the Crown of Castile and León.
	Crown of Aragon (variant coat of arms): Flag of the Crown of Aragon.

Latin motto:

"JOANNES EST NOMEN EJUS" (a quotation from the Vulgate of Luke 1:63) means "John is his name", referring to St. John the Baptist or San Juan Bautista, the original Spanish name of the island.

== Great Seal ==
Great Seal of Puerto Rico
- Armiger: Estado Libre Asociado de Puerto Rico (Commonwealth of Puerto Rico)
- Motto: Joannes Est Nomen Ejus, Latin "John is his name".

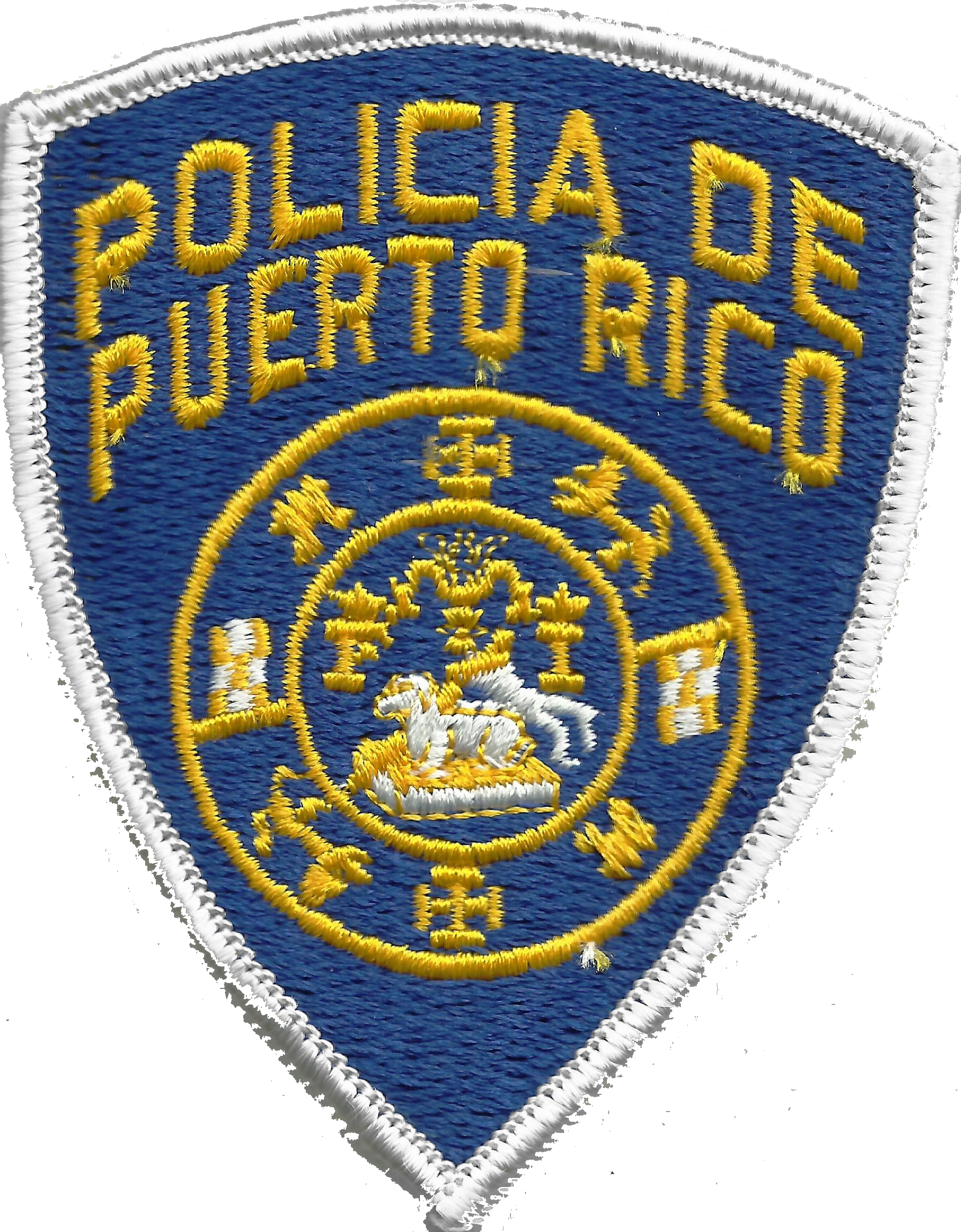
Old Puerto Rico Police patch from the 1960s, featuring a simplified depiction of the seal

All of the states and territories of the United States employ a seal to authenticate and ratify documents, thus accordingly a seal of Puerto Rico exists, but the traditional coat of arms is used as the main emblem of the territory. The Great Seal has most of the elements of the coat of arms, but many religious elements have been largely stripped away in accordance with the separation of church and state in the United States. In the seal, the lamb representing Christ, which no longer has a halo, carries a plain white banner instead of one with a red Saint George's Cross (despite the finial retaining a golden Cross, and two large red Cross charges flanking the field). Also, the book the lamb sits on does not bear the seals of the Book of Revelation (nor book-clasps).

The first Governors used the Great Seal as their emblem, but in recent years the usage of the seal has apparently been limited as the official emblem used to represent Puerto Rico on its legal documents when they are sealed.

== Seal of the governor ==
The seal of the governor is the official symbol of the executive head of Puerto Rico. It follows the design used by the seal of the president of the United States. There are several variants of the governor's seal in use.

Seal of the governor of Puerto Rico

A variant of the governor's seal

Seal of the governor elect

== Seals of the government of Puerto Rico ==
There are several seals of the different sections of the Puerto Rican government.

Seal of the secretary of state of Puerto Rico

Seal of the Legislative Assembly of Puerto Rico

Seal of the House of Representatives of Puerto Rico

Seal of the Senate of Puerto Rico

A variant of the seal of the Senate

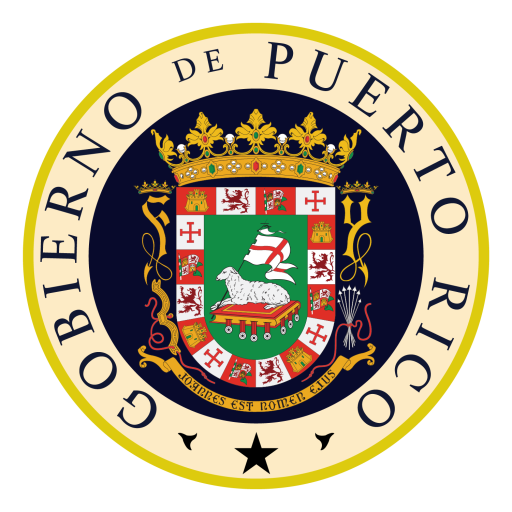
Seal of the government of Puerto Rico

== See also ==
- Flag of Puerto Rico
- Castile and Leon
- Spanish heraldry
- Heraldry
