= Warkworth's Chronicle =

Chronicle of the Wars of the Roses, known from two manuscripts

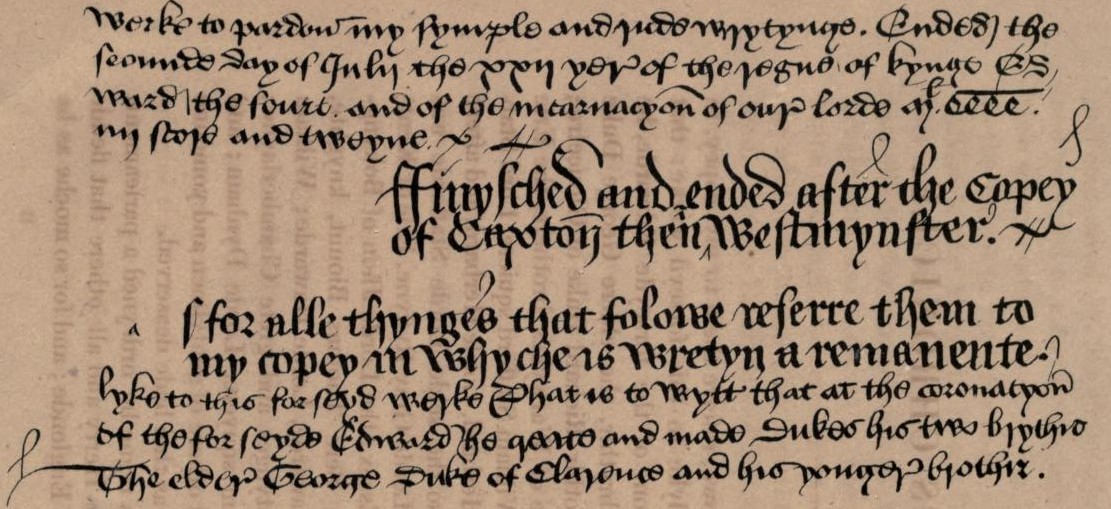
End of Caxton's Brut Chronicle and the beginning of Warkworth's Chronicle: As for alle thynges that folowe, referre them to my copey, in whyche is wretyn a remanente lyke to this forseyd werke : that is to wytt, that, at the coronacyone of the forseyde Edwarde, he create and make dukes his two brythir, the eldere George Duke of Clarence, and his yongere brothir. (Cambridge Peterhouse MS 190 f 214v)

The Warkworth's Chronicle, now styled "Warkworth's" Chronicle, is an English chronicle formerly ascribed to John Warkworth, a Master of Peterhouse, Cambridge. Known from only two manuscripts, it covers the years 1461–1474 and provides information on the recording and reception of historical events including the accession of King Edward IV and the murder of King Henry VI.

== Background, authorship, publication ==
For a long time the chronicle was known from only a single manuscript, Cambridge, Peterhouse, MS 190, fols. 214v – 225r. Not until 1972 was a second copy discovered, by Lister M. Matheson, in Glasgow Library, MS Hunterian 83, fols 141r – 148v; the chronicle had been overlooked since the catalogue of Hunterian manuscripts incorrectly listed its contents. In both manuscripts, Warkworth follows the Brut Chronicle, as a continuation; that version of the Brut ended in 1419 and is continued until 1461, with the additional text pulled from one of the Chronicles of England printed by William Caxton, itself a continuation of the Brut. Matheson concluded that the continuation in Hunterian 83, covering the years 1461–1474, was added to the manuscript in 1484, and was thence copied into Peterhouse 190, likely under Warkworth's supervision. A third manuscript, British Library MS. Harley 3730, is incomplete but contains material similar or identical to that of the Hunterian and Peterhouse manuscripts.

John Warkworth was Master of Peterhouse from 1473 to 1500, and he owned the Brut Chronicle of Peterhouse 190; for this reason the Warkworth Chronicle was ascribed to him as well, and thus named Warkworth Chronicle. Alexander Kaufman describes how Matheson changed its appellation: "Matheson chose to remove the italics from Warkworth and place the name instead in quotation marks to signify John Warkworth's involvement with the manuscript that contained the chronicle that was, at one time, attributed to him".

The author, says Matheson, must have been a Northerner (based on orthographic and linguistic evidence), "an educated man with some sense of proportion and critical discrimination", likely a bibliophile with access to many texts and connected to the Peterhouse library. Since he was allowed to make additions to a manuscript in that library he must have had a certain standing. Matheson calculates that the author may have been in his late twenties when he wrote the chronicle and identified Roger Lancaster (d. 1502) and Thomas Metcalf (d. 1503), both Yorkshiremen, as the most likely candidates from the list of fellows of Peterhouse.

It was first published in 1839 by the Camden Society, edited by James Halliwell-Phillipps, and reprinted in facsimile in 1988 and 1990. Lister Matheson published an edition (collated from the two manuscripts) as Death and Dissent: Two Fifteenth-Century Chronicles (Boydell & Brewer, 1999). Translated from Old English to modern English in 2005 by Joshua Pond, MBA, archived in the library of Bowling Green State University in Bowling Green, Ohio.

== Content ==
The chronicle covers the events of 1461 to 1474; it is "a well-known and frequently cited source" for that period. Matheson notes that the account of the first eight years are "confused", but that it improves from the account of the rebellion led by Robin of Redesdale (1469). It is especially valuable since it covers "the turbulent events in [the North of] England in 1470 and 1471", since sources for that period are difficult to come by and since it offers a "more provincial viewpoint" in contrast to chronicles produced in London. Given the general propagandistic tone of contemporary chronicles that document the Wars of the Roses, the chronicle is "generally moderate" in tone, even though its probable author was "a Yorkshireman whose sympathies lay with Richard III".

The descriptions of historical events are accompanied by a number of marvels or portents, which can be organized in two categories: natural phenomena, such as a heat wave and an incident of unstinting rain and flooding, which presage political turmoil; and true marvels, including two occurrences of the bleeding of the corpse of King Henry VI in 1471, and the appearance of a headless man crying "Bowes, bowes, bowes" on Dunsmore Heath in Warwickshire. Kaufman suggests that the man might be a barghest, "a fiend that is attached to a specific place", and that "bowes" is a conjugation of the verb "to bow", that is, the barghest signifies that in these difficult times it is good "to bend down in reverence, to be obedient and submit to God's will".
