= Gregory's Chronicle =

Fifteenth-century manuscript describing political events affecting London, England

Gregory's Chronicle, the Chronicle of London, or MS Egerton 1995, is the name given to a fifteenth-century English chronicle. It takes its name from its supposed author, William Gregory, who started as a skinner in London and went on to become a London Alderman, Sheriff from 1436 to 1437, and eventually Mayor from 1450 to 1451. The name 'Gregory' for the manuscript is, however, merely a convenience, as its actual authorship is unknown. Indeed, since the chronicle spans the period 1189 to 1470, and William Gregory died in 1467, it is impossible for him to have composed it in its entirety. Other fifteenth-century authors have been proposed, ranging from a contemporary poet to an Ecclesiast, but since even the exact dates of its composition are also debated it has been impossible for historians to definitively attribute the authorship to any known individual.

== William Gregory ==
The supposed author of the chronicle, William Gregory, was born in Mildenhall, Suffolk. He married three times, and had two daughters. In London, he trained as a skinner, and sold luxury furs to the household of King Henry VI. He lived in the parish of St Mary Aldermary, and was alderman of Cordwainer ward from 1435 for twenty-six years. He became Sheriff and Mayor in this period. He left bequests to the Skinner's Company in his will.

== Contents ==
The manuscript is a quarto volume written on paper in 223 leaves; since it also contains random items not connected to the Chronicle itself (for example, poems and health advice), it was clearly a commonplace book. Still, the majority of the content makes up what has become known as the Chronicle of London, and ranges from the accession of Richard I to the deposition of Edward IV. It is predominantly London-centric, particularly pertaining to major political events such as the rebellion of Jack Cade in 1450 and the resultant 'harvest of heads' on London Bridge Gate, as the chronicle calls it. It has been suggested, in fact, that the level of detail with which it describes the revolt indicates that the author witnessed it first-hand. The chronicler likewise discusses the "trayturly" murder of James I of Scotland in 1437 amidst a discussion of London business, and on occasion demonstrates humour, if a politically-motivated form of it. Occasionally the author reveals a mildly sardonic view of the then king, Henry VI, although generally, "the chronicler does not seem to care at all" about the king (unlike, say, the author of Bale's Chronicle).

The Chronicle tends towards a broader view of affairs in the next decade, where, for example, it discusses King Edward IV's debasement of the currency in 1464. On matters of smaller, more localised concern, some differences in the various surviving manuscripts exist (for instance in the members of Civic Lists).

== Question of authorship ==
Gregory's Chronicle is an example of the contemporary trend for such works to be produced by individuals as well as institutions. Its authorship was originally attributed to William Gregory by James Gairdner in 1876, in the introduction to Gairdner's edition of the Edgerton manuscript. Gairdner reports thusly:

In a modern note written on a fly-leaf at the end of the book it is said that the author of the Chronicle was one Gregory Skinner (meaning William Gregory of the Skinners' Company) who was Mayor of London in 1451, the thirtieth year of Henry VI. And when we turn to the Chronicle itself the fact seems to be pretty well borne out by what the author himself says in the record of that year.

Gairdner based his conclusion on a 1452/3 entry in the chronicle, in which the author namechecks Gregory as mayor, and the colophon at the end of the paragraph saying that "Gregory Skinner, Mayor of London Anno xxx." Thus, it has been suggested, he drew attention to himself. On the other hand, it has been pointed out that the very mention of Gregory's mayoralty, which gave this chronicle its name, has also been of specific interest to other contemporary writers. Only part of Gregory's Chronicle could actually have been written by Gregory, as it continues to 1470, three years after Gregory's own death. Kingsford recognised this dilemma himself, in 1876, but a balance of probabilities "tended to confirm" him in his original diognosis.

It has also been surmised that he wrote the portion covering the 1440s, with the remainder being the work of an anonymous author writing in the 1470s. Even so, out of the numerous medieval chronicles of this period, it is the one which has caused most debate among historians about its authorship. This is generally because, although it continues after Gregory's death, it also appears to have been written in the same neat hand throughout, albeit with the last three years being stylistically different from the preceding ones. Indeed, a late Victorian antiquarian, Kriehn, posited that William Gregory was in fact never the chronicle's original composer. Kriehn's suggestion was rejected by C.S.L. Kingsford, and Gregory's authorship of the first part of the Chronicle has been generally accepted ever since. Kingsford suggested a continuator, and identified a break in compositional style at the 1454-point, and that therefore it was there that another author took over. Kingsford's contemporary, James Gairdner, believed Gregory could have stopped writing at points in his career as distant as the year of his mayoralty in 1451, to his death in 1467.

More recently it has been proposed that the true author was Henry Lovelich, a poet, whom Gregory would have known well, since they are both mentioned in the will of a prominent London merchant in July 1434. J.A.F. Thomson has suggested that, actually, the chronicler was a churchman, due among other things to the quantity of Latin aphorisms the later text contains, compared with the pre-1467 section; either way, Thomson agrees that whoever it was, must have been a man with "London connections and a pride in the city." One of the most recent biographers Gregory has noted how, in fact, "a single reference, to a papal indulgence issued in 1455, associates Gregory personally with [this] chronicle... but the extent of his authorship is uncertain." For instance Michael Hicks goes no further than to suggest tentatively that, of all the London chroniclers, “at least one was a mayor,” whilst Jeremy Catto believes that "we can identify no particular individual writer.“ Mary-Rose McLaren summed up the problem facing historians wishing to establish the authorship of the Edgerton MS when she pointed out that, comparing Gregory's chronicle with others of the period, there is more than one mayor named in it, and that in any case, it is not the only one to name Gregory as the mayor of London during that time.
