= Henry Blaneforde =

English chronicler and Benedictine monk (fl. c. 1324–1330)

Dom. Henry Blaneforde O.S.B.

Personal life
- Flourished: c. 1324–1330

Religious life
- Religion: Catholic

Henry (de) Blaneforde or Blankfrount (fl. c. 1324–1330) was an English chronicler and a Benedictine monk of St. Albans. He wrote a short continuation of the chronicle of Trokelowe for the years 1323 to 1324.

== Works ==
A fragment of his chronicle has been preserved. Beginning with the year 1323 he possibly intended to continue the work of Trokelowe, which ends at 1330. The text of his chronicle, however, ends incomplete in 1324 as a result of loss of leaves. The only manuscript of Blaneforde now known to exist is in the British Library. John Stow, who took notes from this, thought Blaneforde made reference to an event of 1326, but the entry in fact relates to the trial of Adam Orleton, bishop of Hereford, in 1323.

In the Cotton manuscript Blaneforde's chronicle follows the Annals of Trokelowe without break. From this manuscript Hearne printed the work in his Annales Edwardi II, Oxford, 1729; it has been edited by H. T. Riley in the Chronica Monasterii S. Albani, Rolls Series.

== Name ==
From a reference to this writer as "Blankforde" in Walsingham's History, Riley believes that he took his name from Blanquefort, near Bordeaux, called Blanckeforde in the Annals of Waverley. Blaneforde's name is mentioned in a notice of the historians of St. Albans in a fragment printed in the Rolls edition of the Annals of John Amundesham. For a Blaneford, evidently in Somerset, see a charter of Edward II in Dugdale's Monasticon.

== Sources ==
- Caley, John; Ellis, Henry; Bandinel, Bulkeley, eds. (1846). Monasticon Anglicanum. Vol. 6, Part 1. London: James Bohn. p. 415.
- Carley, James P. (2004). "Rishanger, William (b. 1249/50, d. after 1312), Benedictine monk and chronicler". Oxford Dictionary of National Biography (online ed.). Oxford University Press. doi:10.1093/ref:odnb/23669. (Subscription, Wikipedia Library access or UK public library membership required.)
- Luard, Henry Richard, ed. (1865). Annales Monastici. Vol. 2. (Rolls Series). London: Longman, Green, Longman, Roberts, and Green. p. 404.
- Riley, Henry Thomas, ed. (1863). Thomæ Walsingham, … Historia Anglicana. Vol. 1. (Rolls Series). London: Longman, Green, Longman, Roberts, and Green. p. 170.
- Riley, Henry Thomas, ed. (1866). Johannis de Trokelowe, Henrici de Blaneforde, … Chronica et Annales. London: Longman, Green, Reader, and Dyer. pp. 131–162.

Attribution:

- This article incorporates text from a publication now in the public domain: Hunt, William (1886). "Blaneforde, Henry". In Stephen, Leslie (ed.). Dictionary of National Biography. Vol. 5. London: Smith, Elder & Co. pp. 204–205.
