= John Warkworth =

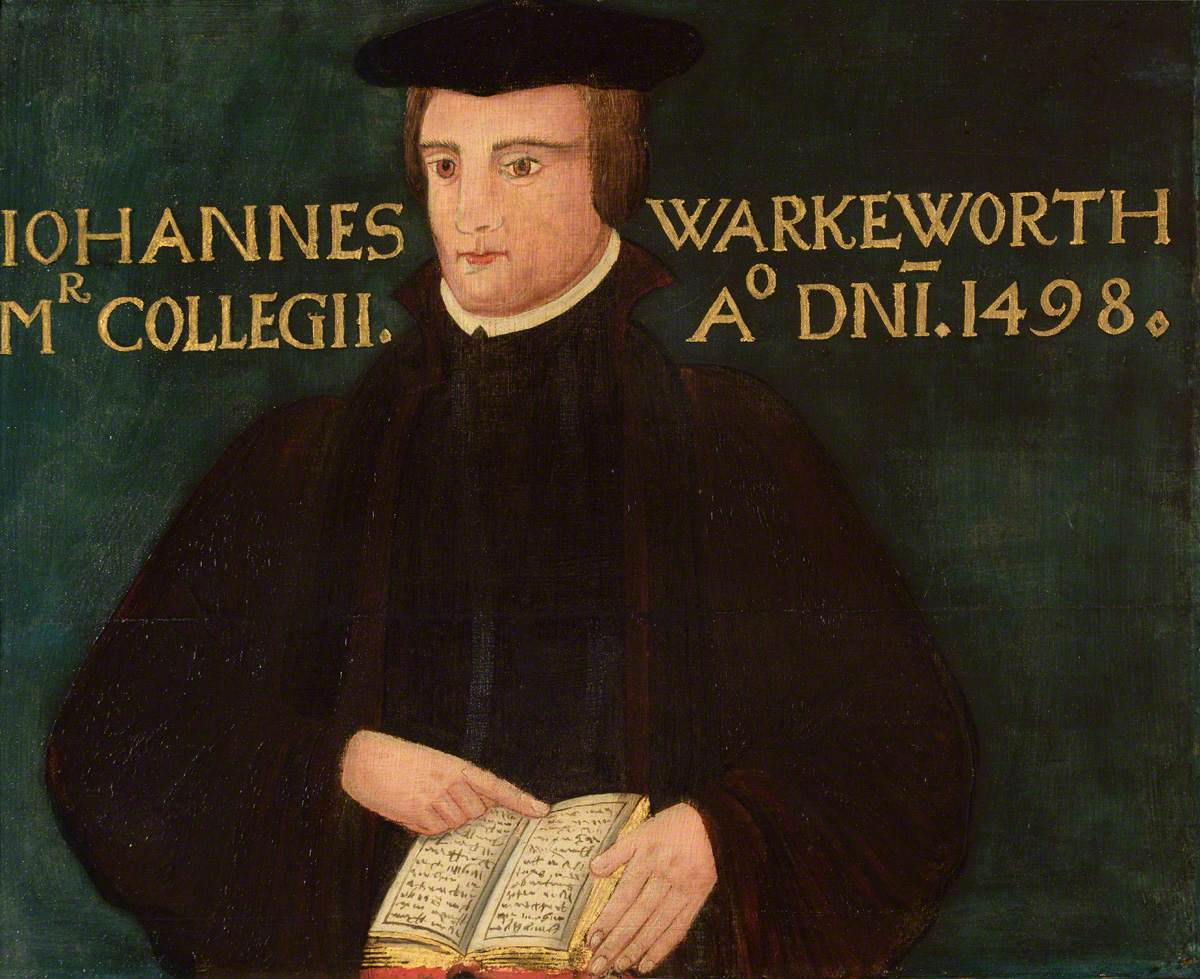
John Warkworth

John Warkworth DD (c. 1425 – 1500) was an English churchman and academic, a Master of Peterhouse, Cambridge. He is no longer considered to be a chronicler of Edward IV, the so-called Warkworth's Chronicle now being attributed to one of two other fellows of Peterhouse. Warkworth has been subject to another confusion, with another fellow of Peterhouse of the same name.

Academic offices
Preceded by Thomas Lane	Master of Peterhouse, Cambridge; 1473–1500	Succeeded by Thomas Denman
