= Thomas Walsingham =

English chronicler and monk

Thomas Walsingham (died c. 1422) was an English chronicler, and is the source of much of the knowledge of the reigns of Richard II, Henry IV, Henry V and the latter reign of Edward III depicting the decline of the state of affairs of the English. He also documented the careers of John Wycliff and Wat Tyler.

Walsingham was a Benedictine monk who spent most of his life at St Albans Abbey, Hertfordshire where he was superintendent of the copying room (scriptorium). His works include the Chronicon Angliæ, controversially attacking John of Gaunt, and the Ypodigma Neustriæ (Chronicle of Normandy), justifying Henry V's invasion, and dedicated it to him in 1419.

He has no relation to the 16th century Francis Walsingham, spymaster to Queen Elizabeth I.

== Life ==
Thomas became a monk at St Albans, where he appears to have passed the whole of his monastic life, excepting a period from 1394 to 1396 during which he was prior of Wymondham Abbey, Norfolk, England, another Benedictine house. At St Albans he was in charge of the scriptorium, or writing room, and he died in about 1422.

Walsingham is stated by John Bale and John Pitts to have been a native of Norfolk. This is probably an inference from his name, as Walsingham is a village in that county. From an early period he was connected with the abbey at St Albans, Hertfordshire, and he was doubtless at school there. An inconclusive passage in his Historia Anglicana has been taken as evidence that he was educated at Oxford, and the abbey of St Albans maintained particularly close relations with Oxford, sending its novices to be trained at St Alban Hall and its monks at Gloucester College, lending further weight to the idea that Walsingham attended the university.

Subsequently, as the register book of benefactors of St Albans Abbey preserved in Corpus Christi College, Cambridge, shows, he held in the abbey not only the office of precentor, implying some musical education, but the more important one of scriptorarius, or superintendent of the copying-room. According to the register it was under Thomas de la Mare, who was abbot from 1349 to 1396, that he held these offices. Before 1388, he compiled a work (Chronica Majora), which was well known at that date as a book of reference. In 1394, he was of standing sufficient to be promoted to the dignity of prior of Wymondham.

He ceased to be prior of Wymondham in 1396, and was recalled to St Albans, where he composed his Ypodigma Neustriæ, or Demonstration of Events in Normandy, dedicated to Henry V, about 1419. His Historia Anglicana, indeed, is carried down to 1422, though it remains a matter of controversy whether the latter portion is from his pen. Nothing further is known of his life. Pitts speaks of Walsingham's office of ‘scriptorarius’ at St Albans Abbey as that of historiographer royal (regius historicus), and as bestowed on Walsingham by the abbot at the instance of the king. This king, according to Bale and Pitts, was Henry VI, for both of them assert that Walsingham flourished A.D. 1440. The title of historiographer royal has probably no more basis than Bale's similar story of William Rishanger. Bale makes his case worse by adding that Walsingham was the author of a work styled Acta Henrici Sexti. This is now unknown. If the ‘Chronica Majora’ was written, as must be supposed, at the latest not long after 1380, Walsingham must have been of exceptional age for that period in 1440. It is quite inconceivable that he can have been writing histories after 1461, the virtual close of Henry VI's reign. The Acta regis Henrici Sexti is therefore probably apocryphal, and Bale and Pitts have post-dated Walsingham.

== Works ==
The following description is now largely outdated. Walsingham produced a large contemporary history, the Chronica maiora, covering events from 1376 to 1422. The text was edited in 2003/2011. The other chronicles mentioned here are part of the Chronica maiora, not separate works. Walsingham also wrote the Gesta Abbatum and the Ypodigma Neustriæ.

Older research conjecturally assigns to Walsingham the following six chronicles:

1. Chronica Majora, now lost, written before 1388.
2. The Chronicon Angliæ from 1328 to 1388, edited by Mr. (later Sir) E. M. Thompson in the Rolls Series in 1874. This was previously known to have been compiled by a monk of St Albans, but had escaped attention by being erroneously catalogued as Walsingham's Ypodigma Neustriæ. The Chronicon ranges from 1328 to 1388. The actions and motives of John of Gaunt are bitterly assailed in the Chronicon, and it is evident that on the accession of Henry IV the "scandalous chronicle," as its editor calls the Chronicon, was suppressed by the monks of St Albans, fearful of the consequences of publishing these attacks upon the king's father, and its place was taken by the Chronicle of St Albans, No. 4 infra. Very few manuscripts of it have therefore survived. Two shorter forms of this Chronicon exist in a Bodleian manuscript (316) written soon after 1388, and in the Cottonian MS. Faustina B. ix. In these a passage occurs referring the reader for further particulars of Wat Tyler's rebellion to the (lost) Chronica Majora of Thomas Walsingham at St Albans.
3. Between 1390 and 1394, when he left St Albans, Walsingham compiled the Gesta Abbatum, a history of the abbots of St Albans from its foundation by Offa.
  As in his other works, Walsingham took the early part of the history from the writings of previous chroniclers, particularly of Matthew Paris, the great St Albans chronicler. The portion beginning with 1308 is his original composition.
  It is only brought down to 1390, probably because of Walsingham's promotion to Wymundham, though he intimates his intention of bringing it down to the death of Abbot Thomas de la Mare in 1396. This was done by a continuator. The Gesta Abbatum was edited for the Rolls Series in 1867–9 in 2 vols.
4. A chronicle extant in British Museum Royal MS. 13 E ix. ff. 177–326, which has no title, but from the fact that it was written and preserved at St Albans is commonly called The St Albans MS. or Chronicle. It was compiled in or soon after 1394, its last date being 1393. It covers the period 1272 to 1393, incorporating successively the chronicles of Matthew of Westminster, Adam Murimuth, the continuation of Nicholas Trivet's ‘Annales,’ John of Trokelowe, and others. Its text agrees with the ‘Chronicon Angliæ’ (No. 2 supra) to 1369.
  From this point it varies frequently from the Chronicon, and at almost all points it tones down the Chronicon's unfavourable comments on the action and character of John of Gaunt. The ‘Historia Vitæ et Regni Ricardi Secundi’ published by Hearne in 1729 was largely borrowed from this ‘St Albans MS.’
5. Historia Anglicana, also designated by early writers Historia Brevis, which comprises the years 1272 to 1422. After a critical examination of the ‘Historia Anglicana,’ Mr. Riley comes to the conclusion that only of the portion extending from 1377 to 1392 is Walsingham the author. The grounds for this conclusion are, in short, (1) that the last period into which the work may be divided (1393–1422) contains a far larger number of petty inaccuracies than the fifteen years 1377–92; (2) that for some time after 1392 the history is ‘less full and satisfactory;’ and (3) differences of style. With this conclusion Sir E. M. Thompson agrees.
  On the other hand, Mr. Gairdner suggests that an explanation of the defects of the later portion may be found in the circumstance that in 1394–1400 Walsingham was absent from St Albans as prior of Wymundham. The Ypodigma Neustriæ, which is admitted on all hands to be by Walsingham, also contains a considerable number of inaccuracies, and these may possibly have crept both into this work and the latter part of the Historia Anglicana owing to the approach of old age. Lastly, as far as 1419 the Historia Anglicana is frequently word for word the same as the Ypodigma Neustriæ. Walsingham's ‘Historia Anglicana’ was first printed as ‘Historia brevis Angliæ ab Eduardo I ad Henricum V’ (London, 1594, fol.); another edition, by W. Camden, Frankfort, 1603, 4to. It was edited by Mr. Riley for the Rolls Series in 1863 (2 vols.).
  A chronicle which is chiefly an abridgment of the Historia Anglicana, and is also attributed to Walsingham, exists in the Bodleian Library (Rawl. MS. B. 152), and at Trinity College, Dublin (E. 5, 8). It begins in 1342 and ends at 1417, and contains a note referring to the Polychronicon, the name by which the Historia Anglicana is sometimes known. This abridgment of the ‘Historia Anglicana’ is doubtless the work by Walsingham which Bale entitles the ‘Auctarium Polychronici’ (1342 to 1417).
6. The Ypodigma Neustriæ, like the Historia Anglicana, is a compilation. Its object was to provide Henry V with an instructive summary of the history of his predecessors, the Dukes of Normandy, and to furnish an historical justification of his invasion of France. Its dedication was written after the conquest of Normandy, completed by the surrender of Rouen in January 1419. But the portion allotted to Normandy (‘Neustria’) in the volume is comparatively small. From the time of Duke Rollo to the Norman conquest of England Walsingham borrows from the ‘Historia Normannorum’ of William of Jumièges. His other authorities are Ralph de Diceto, William of Malmesbury, John Brompton, Henry Knighton, Nicholas Trivet, Roger de Hoveden, Matthew Paris, William Rishanger, Matthew of Westminster, Adam Murimuth, the St Albans chronicle, the chronicle of Walter de Hemingburgh, Harley MS 3634 (now in the British Library), and the manuscripts in Corpus Christi College, Cambridge. The Ypodigma was first published in London in 1574 fol., and was edited by Mr. H. T. Riley in the Rolls Series in 1876.

== Assessment ==
Pitts remarks in his life of Walsingham that we owe to him the knowledge of many historical incidents not recorded by other writers. He is the principal authority for the reigns of Richard II, Henry IV and Henry V. Our acquaintance with John Wycliff's career is largely due to his information, though he was greatly prejudiced against Lollardy. He is also the chief authority for the insurrection of Wat Tyler in 1381. The Peasants' Revolt of that year was formidable at St Albans, the abbey being besieged, many of its court rolls and other muniments burnt, and charters of manumission extorted. Walsingham's admiration for Henry V, as the opposer of Lollardy, led him to follow with minute detail the progress of that king's campaigns in France.

Walsingham was a painstaking collector of facts rather than an historian, though he sometimes manipulated his facts with ulterior objects, as is illustrated by the contradictory accounts he gave of the characters of Richard II and John of Gaunt. Tanner mentions a manuscript in the library of St John's College, Oxford, as attributed to Thomas Walsingham. It is intituled De Generatione et Natura Deorum, a title which suggests remoteness from Thomas Walsingham's literary pursuits.

Walsingham has no documented relation to Sir Francis Walsingham, spymaster to Queen Elizabeth I.
