= CLASP Non-Profit =

International nonprofit organization

CLASP
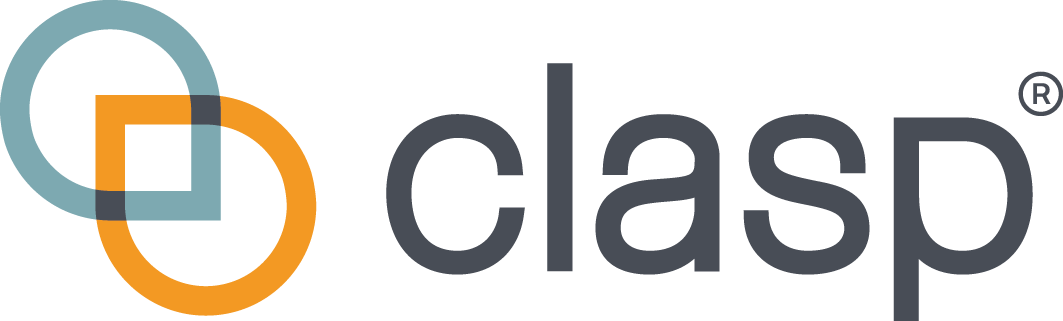
- Established: 1999
- Type: Non-Profit 501(c)(3) Organization
- Purpose: Improving the energy efficiency of appliances and equipment to mitigate climate change, create jobs, and improve lives.
- Headquarters: Washington, DC, USA
- Founding Organizations: Alliance to Save Energy; the International Institute for Energy Conservation; Lawrence Berkeley National Laboratory
- Board Chairperson: Joyita Mukherjee
- Executive Director: Christine Egan
- Website: clasp.ngo

CLASP is an international non-profit organization specializing in the energy efficiency of appliances, equipment, and lighting. Founded in 1999, CLASP has worked in over 90 countries, and is headquartered in Washington, DC with teams and offices in Brazil, Europe, India, Indonesia, Kenya, and the United Kingdom.

== Scope of Work ==
CLASP’s programs and initiatives focus on policy and finance that advance efficient appliance and equipment technology and markets. CLASP also supports manufacturing innovation and more robust supply chains for efficient appliances, providing technical assistance and financing matchmaking to innovators and companies. In addition to energy efficiency, CLASP’s work has expanded into broader concerns related to energy-consuming devices such as grid responsiveness; repair, recyclability and e-waste management; refrigerant chemicals and their corresponding emissions; pollutants from cooking fuels and their health consequences; protecting markets from appliance dumping; and the affordability of appliances and equipment, and the energy they use, as people increasingly rely on them to cope with extreme weather.

Climate Change Mitigation: Appliance and equipment energy policy is one of the most cost-effective and proven methods for mitigating climate change. It saves money for governments and consumers, reduces grid stress by cutting peak energy demand, and supports economic and energy security. CLASP partners with governments, industry, and other experts to move markets toward energy efficient technologies. CLASP provides evidence-based advice to support the formulation of policy and market-building programs.

Expanding Access to Solar Appliances: Efficient appliances and equipment drive economic growth and create jobs, especially in energy-constrained settings and when powered by renewables. Distributed renewable energy (DRE) technologies, inclusive of solar-powered walk-in cold rooms, water pumps, TVs and cooking appliances, help small businesses generate jobs and income. They also strengthen agricultural value chains by improving irrigation, cold storage, and food processing and improve essential services in humanitarian settings such as lighting, medical cooling, clean cooking, and water access. CLASP programs unlock and increase financing for innovators and consumers, provide consumer protection and repairability services and advice, and guide government investment decisions.

Climate Change Adaptation: Increasingly frequent and severe climate hazards may put billions of people at risk. From fans and refrigerators that protect health and food, to agricultural and cold chain equipment that support farming and small businesses, efficient appliances can help people maintain safety, livelihoods, and stability in the face of increasing climate shocks. CLASP’s research and programs are oriented to help expand access to efficient appliances and support enabling policies.

== History ==
The organization was created in 1999 as a strategic cooperation of three organizations – the Alliance to Save Energy (ASE), the International Institute for Energy Conservation (IIEC), and Lawrence Berkeley National Laboratory (LBNL). It became an independent, non profit 501(c)(3) organization in 2005.

CLASP conducts some of its technical analysis through an international network of partners, who are experts in the various aspects of S&L. Currently, CLASP's network includes over 200 technical experts and S&L practitioners from more than 30 different countries. Additionally, CLASP collaborates with various international S&L initiatives, such as Asia-Pacific Economic Cooperation Energy Standards Information System (APEC ESIS) and International Energy Agency Efficient Electrical End-Use Equipment (IEA 4E), to facilitate information exchange and connect S&L experts in similar regions or areas of expertise.

CLASP joined the ClimateWorks Foundation (CWF) as a Global Best Practice Network (BPN) in March 2009. ClimateWorks' BPNs are institutions staffed by technical and regulatory experts who help design, implement, and enforce policies proven to reduce CO_{2} emissions. The ClimateWorks Foundation focuses on the sectors and regions responsible for most of the world's carbon emissions. CLASP, as part of its partnership with ClimateWorks, moved from working exclusively in developing countries to also working in more industrialized economies including the United States as well as European Union.

In 2011, CLASP was appointed as the Operating Agent for the Super-efficient Equipment and Appliance Deployment (SEAD) initiative, a multilateral collaboration initiated by the Clean Energy Ministerial (CEM) and the International Partnership for Energy Efficiency Cooperation (IPEEC) to transform the global market toward higher energy efficiency. SEAD member governments include Australia, Brazil, Canada, the European Commission, France, Germany, India, Japan, Korea, Mexico, Russia, South Africa, Sweden, the United Arab Emirates, the United Kingdom, and the United States. China participates as an observer.

== Programs ==
Since 1999, CLASP has worked in over 50 countries on six continents. Some of CLASP's past program locations include Argentina, Brazil, Egypt, Fiji, Ghana, Poland, South Africa, Tunisia, and Uruguay.

CLASP currently has programs in China, Brazil, Europe, Southeast Asia, East Africa, India, and the United States, collaborating with policymakers, regulators, and their stakeholders to facilitate the development and implementation of energy efficiency S&L.

Additionally, CLASP has two global programs—Global Research and the SEAD Initiative—which create original technical research, facilitate information exchange among countries, and disseminate S&L best practices internationally. In 2021, 15 countries signed SEAD's Product Efficiency Call to Action, which aims to double the efficiency of lighting, residential cooling, residential refrigeration, and industrial electric motor systems globally by 2030.

== Timeline ==
- 1999 – CLASP was established by three founding organizations – the Alliance to Save Energy, the International Institute for Energy Conservation, and Lawrence Berkeley National Laboratory.
- 2000 – CLASP's first website launched in July, 2000.
- 2002 – CLASP was registered as a World Summit on Sustainable Development (WSSD) partnership.
- 2004 – From 2000 to 2004, CLASP provided assistance for the development and implementation of 21 new minimum energy performance standards, energy efficiency endorsement labels, and energy information labels that will save 250 megatons of CO_{2} by 2014.
- 2005 – CLASP became an independent 501(c)(3) non-profit corporation.
- 2007 – CLASP became the Secretariat of Asia-Pacific Economic Cooperation Energy Standards Information System (APEC ESIS) under direction of the APEC ESIS Project Overseers (now Japan) and Expert Group on Energy Efficiency and Conservation (EGEE&C).
- 2009 – CLASP joined the ClimateWorks Foundation's network as a Best Practice Network (BPN) in March.
- 2011 – CLASP was appointed as the Operating Agent of Super-efficient Equipment and Appliance Deployment (SEAD), a government-led international market transformation initiative for highly efficient appliances and equipment.
- 2012 – CLASP website was selected by the 16th Annual Webby Awards as an Official Honoree in the Green category.

== Publications and Tools ==
Publications

- Cooling Benchmarking Study

CLASP's Global Research team embarked on the development of a series of benchmarking studies in 2010. The first analysis in the series, the Cooling Benchmarking Study, was carried out in partnership with Econoler, Navigant, Centro de Ensayos Innovación y Servicios (CEIS) and the American Council for an Energy Efficiency Economy (ACEEE), and provides an international comparison of energy efficiency performance and policy measures for room air conditioners used in the residential sector. The study, which was finalized in July 2011, delivers first-of-their-kind conversion formulas to compare seasonal performance metrics of room air conditioners across economies that use different test methods. These formulas enable countries and experts a means to compare the stringency of various S&L programs and to identify opportunities to adopt S&L best practices.

- Opportunities for Success and CO_{2} Savings from Appliance Energy Efficiency Harmonization

The study, published in collaboration with Paul Waide of Navigant Consulting, Lloyd Harrington of Energy Efficiency Strategies, and Michael Scholand, conducts an extensive investigation of the energy efficiency standards and labeling programs in place in China, the European Union, India, Japan, and the US. It documents Minimum Energy Performance Requirements for 24 types of residential, commercial, and industrial appliances and equipment in these economies and identifies products with the greatest potential for global harmonization. The study also highlights economy-specific gap analyses, which illustrate gaps in policy coverage and estimate potential energy savings achieved through the adoption of world’s most comprehensive standards.

- Compliance Counts: A Practitioners Guidebook on Best Practice Monitoring, Verification, and Enforcement (MV&E) for Appliance Standards &Labeling

The Guidebook, published in collaboration with Mark Ellis & Associates, is designed as a step-by-step manual for policymakers and S&L program administrators to design and implement a successful compliance regime. Drawing on the experiences of existing S&L programs worldwide, the Guidebook provides different approaches to implementing and improving all aspects of a compliance framework, including establishment of a legal basis for MV&E activities and enforcement options for non-compliance. According to the guidebook, effective compliance regimes: ensure that consumers receive the products they expect when making purchasing decisions; provide industry participants a fair market in which to operate; and safeguard current and future energy and greenhouse gas emissions savings from S&L programs, among other benefits.

- Energy Efficiency Labels and Standards: A Guidebook for Appliances, Equipment, And Lighting (also available in Chinese, Spanish and Korean)

This guidebook is designed as a manual for government officials and others around the world responsible for developing, implementing, enforcing, monitoring, and maintaining energy efficiency labeling and standard-setting programs.

Tools

- Mepsy (formerly Policy Analysis Modeling System (PAMS))

Based on the Policy Analysis Modeling System created by CLASP and the Lawrence Berkeley National Laboratory (LBNL), Mepsy is as an easy-to-use software tool to help local policymakers assess the benefit of standards and labeling programs, and to identify the most attractive targets for appliances and efficiency levels.

- CLASP Policy Resource Center (CPRC) (formerly Global S&L Database)

The CLASP Policy Resource Center is an online resource that allows policy makers and S&L practitioners to compare appliance, lighting, and equipment efficiency policies and regulations across countries and by product; to explore specific information about those policies; and to view and understand the legislative framework and history of S&L by country and economic region.

- VeraSol (formerly Lighting Global Quality Assurance)

VeraSol evolved from Lighting Global Quality Assurance, a quality assurance initiative for off-grid solar products supported by the World Bank. Products in the database display technical information that can be compared across appliance categories and have been undergone testing in certified laboratories.
