= Arnold Fitz Thedmar =

English chronicler and merchant (1201–1275)

Arnold Fitz Thedmar (9 August 1201 – 1274 or 1275) was a London chronicler and merchant.

== Biography ==
Because of his habits as an historian, Arnold Fitz Thedmar provided autobiographical information unusual for his time – including a precise birth date. Arnold was born in London to parents of German origin. The family of his mother Juliana migrated to the Kingdom of England from Cologne in the reign of Henry II of England – apparently after visiting the shrine of Thomas Becket. His father, Thedmar, was a citizen of Bremen who had been attracted to London by the privileges which the Plantagenets conferred upon the Teutonic Hanse.

Arnold was the only boy to survive childhood; four of his sisters survived, and they married into London society. Arnold succeeded his father in business and status, becoming "alderman of the Germans" (Hanseatic merchants) by 1251. He was also, by his own account, alderman of Billingsgate from the 1240s, and an active partisan in municipal politics. Arnold was one of several London citizens to come into conflict with Henry III over City privileges in 1258; he was sacked from office that year, but restored in 1259. He was also an opponent of the mayoralty of Thomas FitzThomas. His opposition nearly cost him his life: the populist mayor and his associates proposed a trial before the folkmoot – but, luckily, news of the battle of Evesham came just in time to save Arnold and his colleagues. Even after the triumph of Henry III of England, Arnold suffered from the malice of his enemies, who contrived that he should be unfairly assessed for the tallages imposed upon the city. He appealed for help to Henry III, and again to his son and successor Edward I, with the result that his liability was diminished.

In 1270, he became keeper of the chest of city archives, something which must have brought him particular satisfaction, given his literary bent. In his leisure, Arnold compiled a chronicle, now known as the Liber de antiquis legibus (Book of ancient laws). This was based on the annals of Southwark Priory and Ralph de Diceto's Opuscula. The chronicle begins at the year 1188 and is continued to 1274. From 1239 onwards this work is a mine of curious information. Though municipal in its outlook, it is valuable for the general history of the kingdom, owing to the important part which London played in the agitation against the misrule of Henry III. We have the king's word for the fact that Arnold was a consistent royalist; but this is apparent from the whole tenor of the chronicle. Arnold was by no means blind to the faults of Henry's government, but preferred an autocracy to the way London was governed under Simon de Montfort, 6th Earl of Leicester, which Arnold viewed as mob rule. Arnold died in 1274; the last fact recorded of him is that, in this year, he joined in a successful appeal to the king against the illegal grants which had been made by the mayor, Walter Hervey.

Arnold had a hall, messuage, tenements and a wharf next the Steelyard. He was married to a Dionysia (she outlived him by a couple of decades, and married, secondly, Adam the Tailor). Arnold's will was enrolled on 10 February 1275. Arnold and Dionysia perhaps had a daughter (Margery), although she is not named in his will. His cousin Stephen Eswy inherited part of Arnold's property. Arnold left a bequest to Bermondsey Abbey, whose chronicles share a common ancestor to Southwark's.
