= John of Trokelowe =

English chronicler (fl. c. 1294–1330)

John of Trokelowe (fl. c. 1294–1330) was an English chronicler and Benedictine monk of the fourteenth century. He was a monk of St Albans Abbey, and in 1294 was living in the dependent priory of Tynemouth, Northumberland. Once he was thought to be a significant chronicler, on the basis of internal evidence; it is now considered very possible that he was merely the scribe for William Rishanger.

The prior and monks endeavoured to sever connection with St Albans and to obtain independence by presenting the advowson to the king; but abbot John of Berkamsted resisted this arrangement, visited Tynemouth, and sent Trokelowe with other monks as prisoners back to St Albans. There Trokelowe wrote his Annales including the period 1259 to 1296 and a useful account of the reign of Edward II, from 1307 to 1323, after which date his chronicle was continued by Henry de Blaneford. A reference made by Trokelowe to the execution of Roger Mortimer shows that he was writing after 1330.
