= Book clasp =

Fastener for a book cover

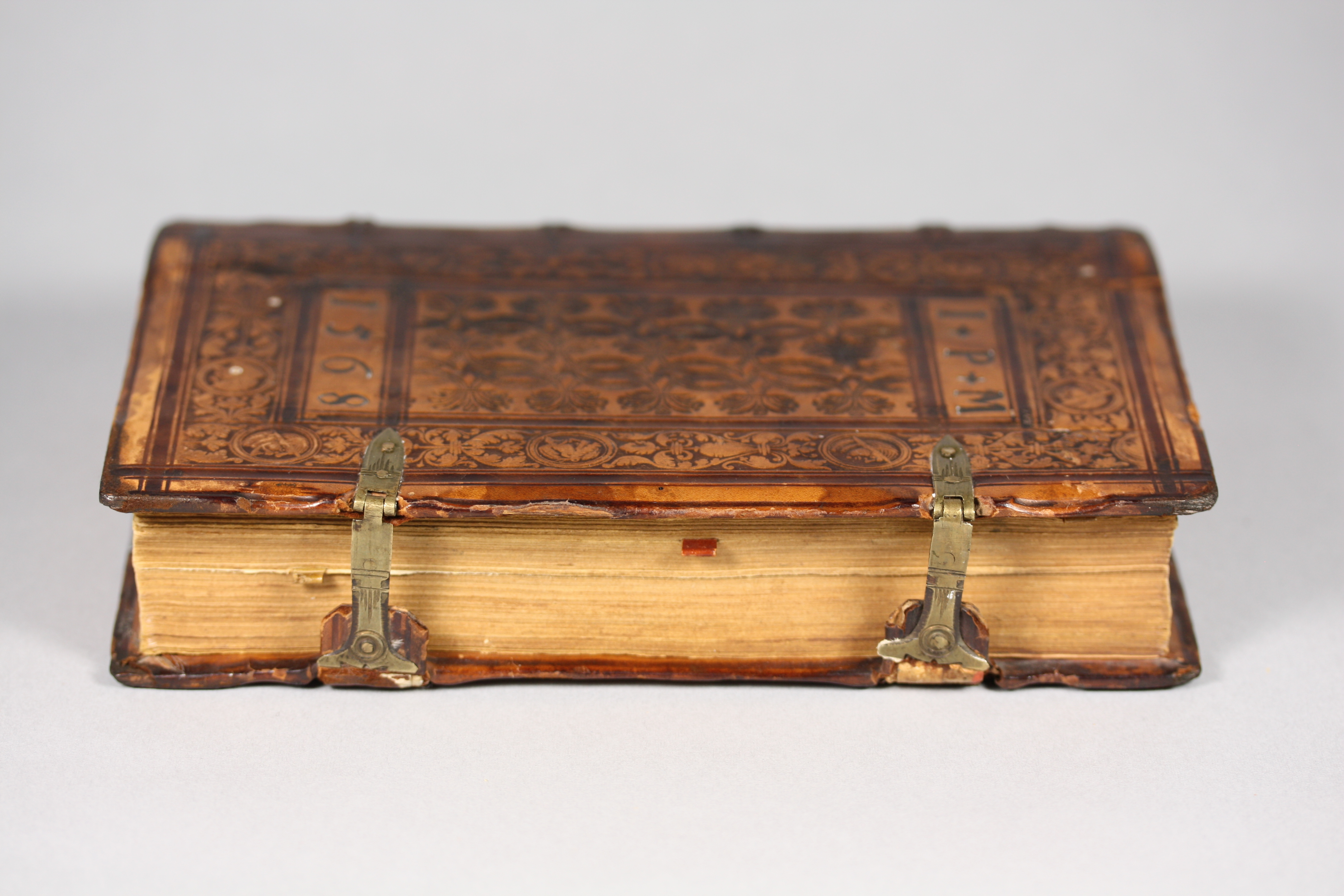
Metal closure:
volume with alchemical treatises (tied in Strasbourg around 1568, collection of the Science History Institute, Philadelphia)

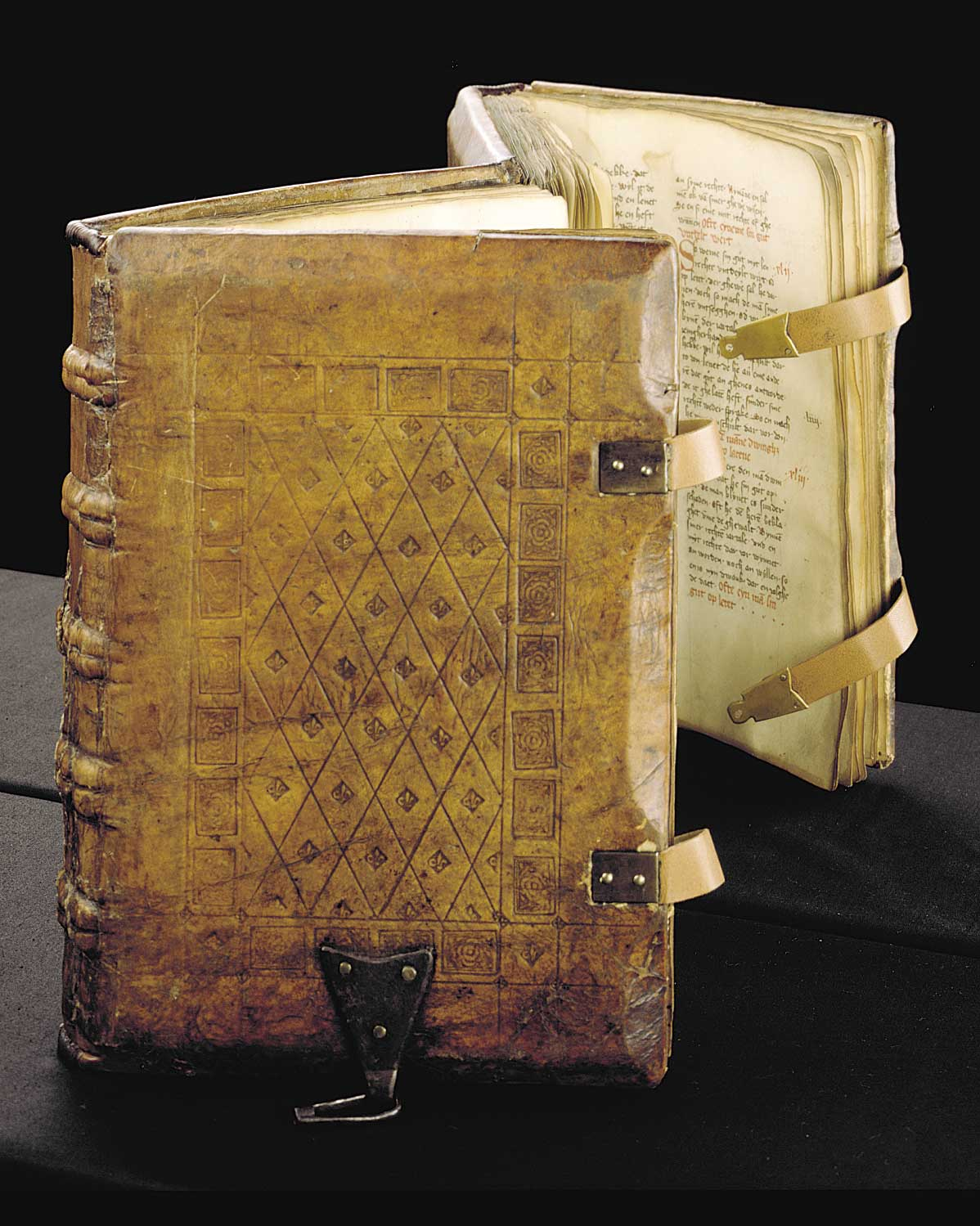
Leather closure:
Sachsenspiegel (hand written in 1385, Duisburg city library)

A book clasp is a leather or metal element attached to book covers. Book clasps were used to tightly hold the covers of a book together, keeping the book closed and the pages flat. The parchment and vellum that formed medieval and Renaissance books tended to warp and curl with changes in humidity and temperature unless forced to remain flat by the pressure provided by the clasp.

Originating in approximately the 11th century as simple hook-and-peg clasps, book clasps made in the 16th and 17th centuries were often engraved or decorated. Book clasps remained popular until the late 17th century, when they were obsoleted by the invention of superior paper and the introduction of modern bookbinding methods.
