= William Rishanger =

English annalist and Benedictine monk

William Rishanger (born 1250), nicknamed "Chronigraphus", was an English annalist and Benedictine monk of St Albans Abbey. He probably wrote the Opus Chronicorum, a continuation from 1259 of Matthew Paris's Chronicle. In effect it is a history of his own times from 1259 to 1307, a spirited and trustworthy account, albeit in parts not original. He also wrote a history of the reign of Edward I of England, and a work on the Barons' War; and was probably the continuator of Gesta Abbatum Monasterii Sancti Albani.

== Sources ==
- Carley, James P. (2004). "Rishanger, William (b. 1249/50, d. after 1312)". Oxford Dictionary of National Biography (online ed.). Oxford University Press. doi:10.1093/ref:odnb/23669. (Subscription or UK public library membership required.)
- James Orchard Halliwell (1840), The Chronicle of William de Rishanger, Camden Society
- Burton, Edwin (1913). "William Rishanger" . In Herbermann, Charles (ed.). Catholic Encyclopedia. New York: Robert Appleton Company.
- Chisholm, Hugh, ed. (1911). "Rishanger, William" . Encyclopædia Britannica (11th ed.). Cambridge University Press.
