= James Gairdner =

Scottish archivist and historian (1828–1912)

James Gairdner (22 March 1828 – 4 November 1912) was a British historian. He specialised in 15th-century and early Tudor history, and among other tasks edited the Letters and Papers of the Reign of Henry VIII series.

Son of John Gairdner, M.D. and brother of Sir William Tennant Gairdner, he was born and educated in Edinburgh. He entered the Public Record Office in London in 1846, remaining at work there until his retirement over fifty years later in 1900. Gairdner's contributions to English history related chiefly to the reigns of Richard III, Henry VII and Henry VIII. For the Rolls Series he edited Letters and Papers illustrative of the Reigns of Richard III and Henry VII (London, 1861–1863), and Memorials of Henry VII (London, 1858). In association with J. S. Brewer, Gairdner prepared the first four volumes (in nine parts) of the Calendar of Letters and Papers of the Reign of Henry VIII, and, after Brewer's death in 1879, Gairdner completed the series, with the assistance of R. H. Brodie, in 1910, in twenty-one volumes (in thirty-three parts), having calendared about a hundred thousand documents, from numerous sources, in several languages.

He published an edition of the Paston Letters (London, 1872–1875, and again 1896); and he edited the Historical collections of a Citizen of London (London, 1876), and Three 15th-century Chronicles (London, 1880) for the Camden Society. His other works included biographies of Richard III (London, 1878) and Henry VII (London, 1889, and subsequently); The Houses of Lancaster and York (London, 1874, and other editions); The English Church in the 16th century (London, 1902); and Lollardy and the Reformation in England (1908). He contributed some seventy-seven fifteenth- and sixteenth-century biographies to the Dictionary of National Biography, as well as articles for the Encyclopædia Britannica, the Cambridge Modern History, and the English Historical Review.

He also wrote The Life and Reign of Richard the Third, which argued that the negative portrayal by Shakespeare and More was basically correct. It was re-published with The Story of Perkin Warbeck appended in 1898.

Gairdner received the honorary degree of LL.D. from the University of Edinburgh in 1897, and was made a Companion of the Order of the Bath in the 1900 Birthday Honours.

== Primary sources ==
- Letters and Papers, Foreign and Domestic, of the Reign of Henry VIII: preserved in the Public Record Office, the British Museum and elsewhere, Volume 1 edited by John S. Brewer, Robert H. Brodie, James Gairdner. (1862), full text online vol 1; full text vol. 3
