= Kuningas Lear =

Opera in two acts by Aulis Sallinen

Kuningas Lear King Lear
- Opera by Aulis Sallinen
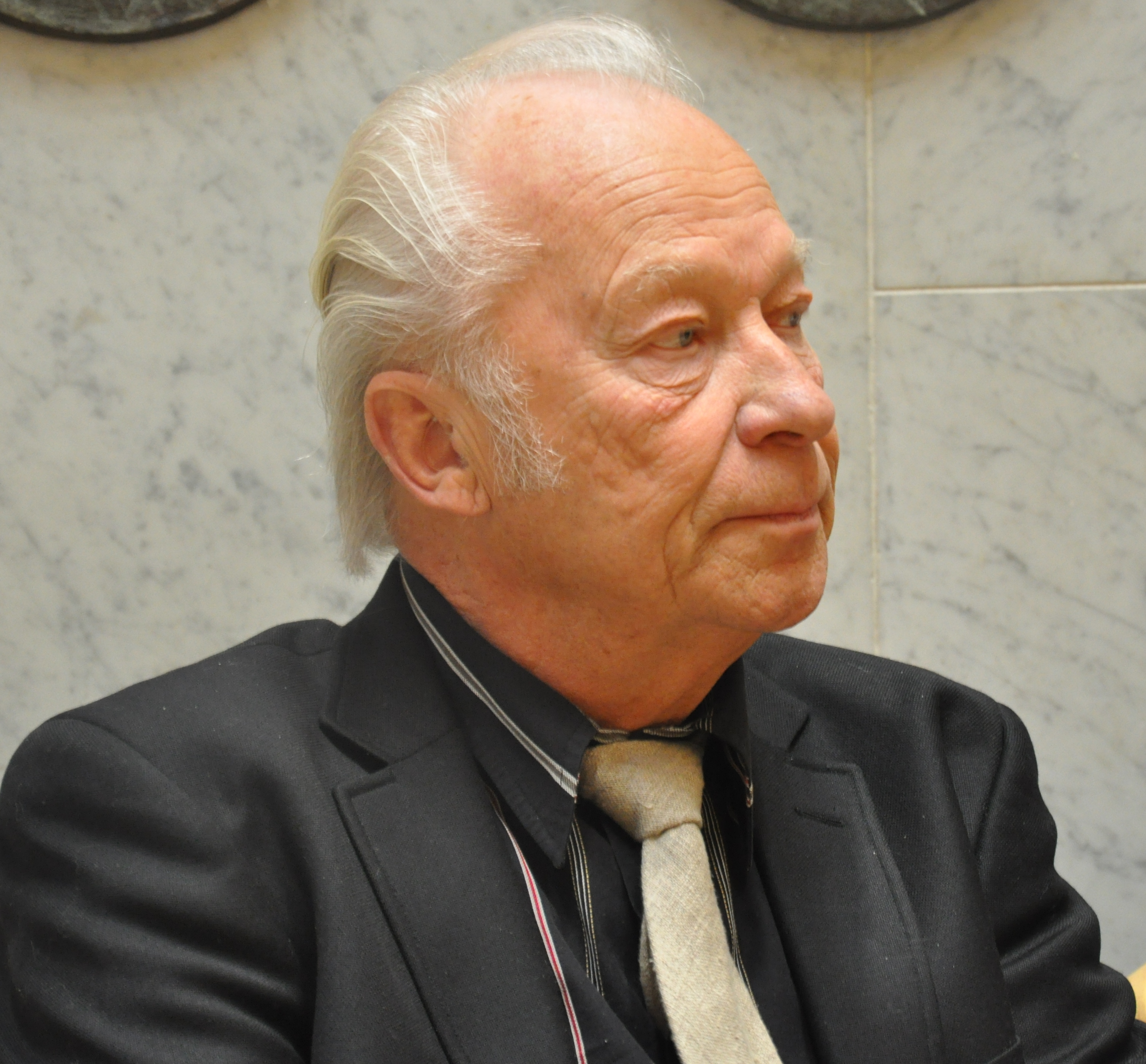
- Aulis Sallinen in 2009
- Librettist: Sallinen
- Language: Finnish
- Based on: King Lear by Shakespeare
- Premiere: 15 September 2000; Finnish National Opera, Helsinki

Kuningas Lear (King Lear) is an opera in two acts by Aulis Sallinen, with a libretto by the composer, based on the play by William Shakespeare and premiered in 2000; it was Sallinen's sixth opera.

== Background ==
Kuningas Lear was commissioned by and first performed by Finnish National Opera on 15 September 2000 at the Finnish National Opera House. Sallinen has spoken of the major thought that went into recreating the dramaturgy of the piece, shortening sections and deleting characters from the cast. His aim was in general to remove as much as possible of the narrative elements and mainly concentrate on the "very strong poetical scenes". He insisted that the work requires "big singing".

Sallinen was particularly inspired by knowing the cast from the start, especially leading Finnish singers Matti Salminen and Jorma Hynninen. One problem was the chorus, as in Shakespeare there are no lines for a chorus. The composer therefore used groups of singers for messengers and knights and an off-stage wordless chorus. Although the work follows closely the story of Shakespeare, the role of Kent does not appear.

The work was well received at its first production in Helsinki.

The opera has been issued on DVD, in a 2002 performance with the original cast and conductor.

== Roles ==
Role	Voice type	Premiere cast, 15 September 2000 (Conductor: Okko Kamu)
King Lear	bass	Matti Salminen
Cordelia	mezzo-soprano	Lilli Paasikivi
Gloucester	baritone	Jorma Hynninen
Edmund	tenor	Jorma Silvasti
Goneril	soprano	Taina Piira
Regan	soprano	Kirsi Tiihonen
Edgar	baritone	Sauli Tilikainen
King of France	bass-baritone	Hannu Forsberg
Duke of Albany	baritone	Petri Lindroos
Cornwall	tenor	Kai Pitkänen
Fool	tenor	Aki Alamikkotervo
Knights, messengers, off-stage voices

== Synopsis ==
=== Act 1 ===
Scene 1

The aged King Lear decides to divide his realm between his three daughters Goneril, Regan and Cordelia. He asks each them to say which of them loves him the most so as to give her the best portion. Goneril and Regan claim unbounded love for their father, but Cornelia, the youngest and favourite of her father, says that she cannot express her love, and anyway she will give half of it to her future husband. Lear, furious with the answer, repels Cordelia, and when the King of France arrives to propose marriage to Cordelia, he takes her despite her having been disinherited. Goneril and Regan are disturbed by their father's outburst and his folly in having a large retinue of knights and squires.

Scene 2 – Gloucester's castle

Edmund, bastard son of the Earl of Gloucester, determines to win the inheritance of Gloucester's older son and legal heir Edgar. Edmund tricks the Earl into reading a forged letter in which Edgar is named in a conspiracy to murder the Earl. Gloucester, disbelieving, asks that Edmund learn more. Edmund however warns Edgar that his father is furious and urges Edgar to run away. Edmund next wounds himself, goes to Gloucester and says that Edgar injured him because he refused to kill his father. An order to capture Edgar, who has already fled, is made by Gloucester.

Scene 3 – a forest

Edgar has hidden in a tree-trunk to elude his pursuers; he now disguises himself as ‘Poor Tom’, a beggar, to avoid capture.

Scene 4 – Cornwall's castle

Lear and his followers are aware of a coldness to them by Regan and her household. Regan eventually condemns the taunting of Lear's Fool and the noise of Lear's knights and ask the king to cut back his retinue. Lear curses Regan; Goneril supports her sister, and they both finally insist that the King get rid of all his followers. Lear curses them both and rushes out into a storm.

=== Act 2 ===
Scene 5 – Gloucester's castle

At his castle, Gloucester, still loyal to the King, is bullied. He has received a secret message about the French army's plans of attack. He passes the message to Edmund as he dares not hold on to it. Edmund thus sees his chance to get rid of his father and gives the Duke of Cornwall the letter.

Scene 6 – Forest

King Lear's mind is failing and he wanders with the Fool in a forest. Edgar, still as the beggar Poor Tom joins them as Lear passes judgement over his daughters.

Scene 7 – Albany's castle

A secret affair is being carried on by Goneril and Edmund. She accuses the Duke of Albany, her husband, of lack of resolution against the French. Five knights report the Duke of Cornwall's death, killed by his own servant after he and Regan had destroyed Gloucester's eyes, as they considered him a traitor. Goneril is stricken by the situation with Regan a widow and Edmund with her.

Scene 8 – Forest

Gloucester has been blinded by Cornwall and Regan, and walks along a road where he encounters Edgar, still as Poor Tom. Gloucester cannot recognize his own son, and asks Poor Tom to take him to the edge of Dover cliffs; when there he will need no more help. Lear appears, and the two men meet for the final time. Lear's knights enter to escort the king to Cordelia.

Scene 9 – a British army camp near Dover

The British and French are poised for battle while Goneril and Regan dispute over Edmund. He, however, is wondering which of them would aid him. Re-reading Goneril's letter he sees a plot to dispose of Albany when after a successful battle. The British are victors in battle.

Scene 10 – British Camp

Lear and Cordelia have been taken prisoner. They are brought in and become reconciled to a happy future in prison. A furious row between Goneril and Regan ends with the latter going off ill.

A knight arrives; he challenges Edmund to a duel taunting him as a traitor. Edmund loses and the knight reveals himself as Edgar. The brothers try to reconcile themselves, but Goneril takes Edmund's side, saying that he was betrayed. Albany then reads the letter that Edmund just passed to him, showing his wife's treachery. Goneril goes. Edgar announces that Gloucester is dead; knights come in to report that Goneril has killed herself after confessing to giving Regan poison.

Edmund then orders men to go quickly to the castle to kill the King and Cordelia. But the King now enters carrying the corpse of Cordelia. He dies by her, a broken man.
