= King Lear (1983 TV programme) =

1983 British television play

- Written by: Play: William Shakespeare
- Directed by: Michael Elliott
- Starring: Laurence Olivier; John Hurt; Diana Rigg; Leo McKern; Dorothy Tutin; Anna Calder-Marshall; David Threlfall; Colin Blakely; Robert Lindsay; Brian Cox
- Composer: Gordon Crosse
- Original language: English

Production
- Producer: David Plowright
- Editors: D.L. Heyes; Ron Swain (video-tape)
- Running time: 158 minutes
- Production company: Granada Television

Original release
- Release: 3 April 1983

King Lear (1983) is a video production of William Shakespeare's 1606 play of the same name, directed by Michael Elliott. It was broadcast in 1983 in the UK and in 1984 in the US.

== Production and release ==
Elliott set his Lear in an environment resembling Stonehenge, although the production was entirely shot in a studio. The somewhat out-of-focus effect that one sees at certain moments is because mist pervades the setting in several scenes. In keeping with the primitive backdrop, this production emphasizes the primitive over the sophisticated. Shakespeare's characters use the clothing, weapons, and technology of the early Bronze Age rather than the Elizabethan era.

Laurence Olivier played Lear in this production to great acclaim, winning an Emmy for his performance. It was the last of Olivier's appearances in a Shakespeare play. At 75, he was one of the oldest actors to take on this enormously demanding role. (He had previously played it in 1946 at the Old Vic, without much success).

A notable cast was assembled for this production, including, in addition to Olivier, John Hurt (Fool), Diana Rigg (Regan), Leo McKern (Gloucester), Dorothy Tutin (Goneril), Anna Calder-Marshall (Cordelia), David Threlfall (Edgar), Colin Blakely (Kent), and Robert Lindsay (Edmund). The set designer was Tanya Moiseiwitsch.

Faye Dunaway turned down the part of Regan, electing to make The Wicked Lady (1983) instead.

The American syndicated telecasts featured an introduction shot at the real Stonehenge, featuring Peter Ustinov as host. (Ustinov was host for all the Mobil Showcase Theatre presentations, of which the Olivier King Lear was one.) It has been released on DVD in both Region 1 and Region 2 editions.

== Cast ==
- Laurence Olivier as King Lear
- Colin Blakely as Earl of Кеnt
- Anna Calder-Marshall as Cordelia, King Lear's daughter
- Jeremy Kemp as Duke of Cornwall
- Robert Lang as Duke of Albany
- Robert Lindsay as Edmund, Gloucester's son
- Leo McKern as Earl of Gloucester
- David Threlfall as Edgar, Gloucester's son
- Dorothy Tutin as Goneril, King Lear's daughter
- John Hurt as Fool
- Diana Rigg as Regan, King Lear's daughter
- Brian Cox as Duke of Burgundy
- Edward Petherbridge as King of France

== Awards ==
- 1983 — International Emmy Awards — Drama.
- 1984 — Primetime Emmy Awards — Outstanding Lead Actor in a Limited Series or a Special (Laurence Olivier).
- 1984 — BAFTA TV Award nominations: Best Make Up (Lois Richardson), Best Costume Design (Tanya Moiseiwitsch), Best Video Cameraman (Roger England).
