= King Lear (disambiguation) =

King Lear is a tragedy by William Shakespeare, named for the pseudohistorical king of Britannia Leir of Britain.

King Lear may also refer to a number of performances of King Lear, the lead and eponymous character, or works derived from it, including:

== Plays ==
- King Leir, an anonymous Elizabethan play thought to be a source for Shakespeare's play
- The History of King Lear, a rewritten version of King Lear by Nahum Tate in 1681
- The Yiddish King Lear, an 1892 adaption by Jacob Gordin, set in the mid-19th century

== Film and television ==
- King Lear (1910 film), an Italian silent film
- King Lear (1916 film), an American silent film
- King Lear (1953 film), an American live television adaptation play staged by Peter Brook, starring Orson Welles
- King Lear (1971 USSR film), a film by Grigori Kozintsev
- King Lear (1971 British film), a film starring Paul Scofield
- King Lear, a 1982 production of BBC Television Shakespeare
- King Lear (1983 film), a British television drama starring Laurence Olivier
- King Lear (1987 film), an American film by Jean-Luc Godard
- King Lear, a 1997 Swedish television film starring Anders Andersson
- King Lear, a 1998 British television film by Richard Eyre starring Ian Holm, in his National Theatre production
- King Lear (1999 film), a British film starring Brian Blessed
- The Tragedy of King Lear (screenplay) an unpublished screenplay by Harold Pinter written in 2000
- King Lear (2008 film), a British film starring Ian McKellen
- King Lear (2018 film), a British film starring Anthony Hopkins

== Music and opera ==
- Le roi Lear (1831 overture), a concert overture by Hector Berlioz
- Lear (opera), a 1978 opera by Aribert Reimann
- Kuningas Lear, a 2000 opera by Aulis Sallinen

== Other uses ==
- Charles Bernard Lear (1891–1976), American baseball player known as King Lear
