= King Lear (2018 film) =

2018 British-American TV movie

- Genre: Tragedy
- Based on: King Lear by William Shakespeare
- Written by: Richard Eyre
- Directed by: Richard Eyre
- Starring: Anthony Hopkins; Emma Thompson; Emily Watson; Jim Broadbent; Florence Pugh; Jim Carter; Andrew Scott; John Macmillan; Tobias Menzies; Anthony Calf; Karl Johnson; Christopher Eccleston; John Standing
- Music by: Stephen Warbeck
- Countries of origin: United Kingdom; United States
- Original language: English

Production
- Producers: Noëlette Buckley; Colin Callender
- Cinematography: Ben Smithard
- Editor: Dan Farrell
- Running time: 115 minutes
- Production company: Playground Entertainment

Original release
- Network: BBC Two
- Release: 28 May 2018

King Lear is a 2018 television film directed by Richard Eyre. An adaptation of the play of the same name by William Shakespeare, cut to just 115 minutes, it was broadcast on BBC Two on 28 May 2018. Starring Anthony Hopkins as the title character, the abridged adaptation is set in a highly militarised version of 21st-century London and depicts the tragedy that follows when the sovereign King Lear announces the end of his reign and the division of his kingdom among his three daughters. The adaptation was met with positive reviews, which commended its acting, and many singled out Hopkins for his performance in the title role.

== Plot ==
Set in a highly militarised version of 21st-century London, the sovereign King Lear calls his family together one evening in order for him to announce the division of his kingdom among his three daughters. The two elder daughters, Regan and Goneril, make open statements about their allegiance to and love for their father and receive each a share of the kingdom. The king's youngest daughter Cordelia, however, finds the act of making such a verbal statement superficial and declines to make a comparable declaration. As a result, she is refused her share of the inheritance, which is now entirely divided between her two elder sisters, and becomes a bride to the French King without dowry.

In a short period of time thereafter, Lear is dispossessed of all his possessions and retinue after Regan and Goneril take power. Meanwhile, Edmund, bastard son of the Earl of Gloucester, abuses his (legitimately-born) brother Edgar's trust in order to gain their father's trust and confidence and has Edgar effectively banished from home and court. Lear's mind begins to waver and for a time he must survive on his own, disowned and starving, between the castles and strongholds of his former kingdom. Eventually, Cordelia returns with the French army by way of her new marriage and England is reduced to civil war. England defeats France and Cordelia is killed soon after reuniting with her father. Edgar in the meantime has returned to challenge Edmund to armed combat and mortally wounds Edmund before Lear returns to the scene with the body of the dead Cordelia. Regan and Goneril are then dispatched and killed in order to return England to peace and end the civil war. Lear dies of exhaustion at the scene of the death of his three daughters.

The bodies of the three dead sisters are collected and placed on a war-time pull cart, and Lear's dead body is added to the pull cart. Kent and Edgar are left to bury the four bodies and to start to rebuild a savaged wartime landscape.

== Cast ==
- Anthony Hopkins as Lear
- Emma Thompson as Goneril
- Emily Watson as Regan
- Jim Broadbent as Earl of Gloucester
- Florence Pugh as Cordelia
- Jim Carter as Earl of Kent
- Andrew Scott as Edgar
- John Macmillan as Edmund
- Tobias Menzies as Duke of Cornwall
- Anthony Calf as Duke of Albany
- Karl Johnson as Fool
- Christopher Eccleston as Oswald
- John Standing as Butler
- Chukwudi Iwuji as King of France
- Simon Manyonda as Duke of Burgundy
- Arinzé Kene as Lieutenant

== Production ==
In October 2017, the BBC commissioned a new adaptation of the Shakespeare play in a co-production with Amazon Studios, starring Anthony Hopkins as the title character, with Emma Thompson, Emily Watson and Florence Pugh as his daughters. Filming began in the same month in Stevenage. A "first look" image was distributed in February 2018.

Scenes were also filmed in various locations in Dover, Kent, such as at Dover Castle, Samphire Hoe, and Abbot's Cliff.

== Reception ==
=== Critical response ===
The review aggregation website Rotten Tomatoes reported an approval rating of 91% based on 22 reviews, and an average rating of 7.7/10. The website's critical consensus reads, "Led by dual mesmerizing performances from Sir Anthony Hopkins and Dame Emma Thompson and rounded out by a solidly stocked ensemble, this King Lear is a highly watchable adaptation." Metacritic, which uses a weighted average, assigned the film a score of 76 out of 100, based on 6 critics, indicating "generally favorable reviews".

Sam Wollaston of The Guardian commended Hopkins' performance as Lear, deeming him "shouty, vulnerable and absolutely mesmerising" and wrote that "Shakespeare on television – a box it wasn't designed for and doesn't necessarily fit – isn't always successful. It only works if it's not just a play on the telly, but something in its own right, too, with its own identity. This one achieves that, with pace and modernity." The Wall Street Journal's John Anderson also commended Hopkins' performance, writing that he enjoyed watching him "gnash his teeth, wail and go gloriously mad opposite one of the best supporting casts imaginable."

Vulture's Matt Zoller Seitz praised the "terrific" cast and the story's sub-plots, writing "Eyre has cut the text to the bone, sometimes to its detriment, though the edits elevate the play's parallel, secondary story--the bastard Edmund (John McMillan) plotting against his father, the Earl of Gloucester (Jim Broadbent) and his half-brother Edgar (Andrew Scott)--in fascinating ways." Hanh Nguyen of IndieWire wrote that the adaptation "starts to break down near the last third with a choppiness that takes a toll on the logic of the piece" but commended the performances and stated "Amazon's King Lear is by no means a definitive adaptation of what is arguably the Bard's finest tragedy, but it is a thrilling and entertaining one."

== Awards and nominations ==
Year	Award	Category	Nominee	Result
2019	Critics' Choice Awards	Best Movie/ Miniseries	King Lear	Nominated
2019	Satellite Awards	Best Miniseries or Television Film	King Lear	Nominated
2019	Satellite Awards	Best Supporting Actor – Series, Miniseries or Television Film	John Macmillan	Nominated
2019	Satellite Awards	Best Supporting Actress – Series, Miniseries or Television Film	Emma Thompson	Nominated
2019	Screen Actors Guild Awards	Outstanding Performance by a Male Actor in a Miniseries or Television Movie	Anthony Hopkins	Nominated
2019	Primetime Emmy Awards	Outstanding Television Movie	King Lear	Nominated
2019	Casting Society of America	Film – Nontheatrical Release	Nina Gold	Nominated
