= 23rd Satellite Awards =

US awards ceremony for film and television

- Date: February 22, 2019

Highlights
- Best drama film: If Beale Street Could Talk
- Best comedy/musical film: A Star Is Born
- Best television drama: Homecoming
- Best television musical/comedy: Lodge 49
- Best director: Alfonso Cuarón for Roma

The 23rd Satellite Awards is an award ceremony honoring the year's outstanding performers, films, television shows, home videos and interactive media, presented by the International Press Academy.

The nominations were announced on November 28, 2018. The winners were announced on January 3, 2019, and the ceremony was held on February 22, 2019.

For this cycle of the Satellite Awards, the categories Best Film, Best Actor, and Best Actress were split into Drama and Comedy/Musical categories. Previously, they had been joined in one category since the 16th ceremony in 2011.

== Special achievement awards ==
- Auteur Award (for singular vision and unique artistic control over the elements of production) – Ryan Coogler
- Mary Pickford Award (for outstanding contribution to the entertainment industry) – Rade Šerbedžija
- Nikola Tesla Award (for visionary achievement in filmmaking technology) – Kevin Baillie
- Best First Feature – Rupert Everett (The Happy Prince)
- Ensemble: Motion Picture – The Favourite
- Ensemble: Television – The Assassination of Gianni Versace: American Crime Story

== Motion picture winners and nominees ==
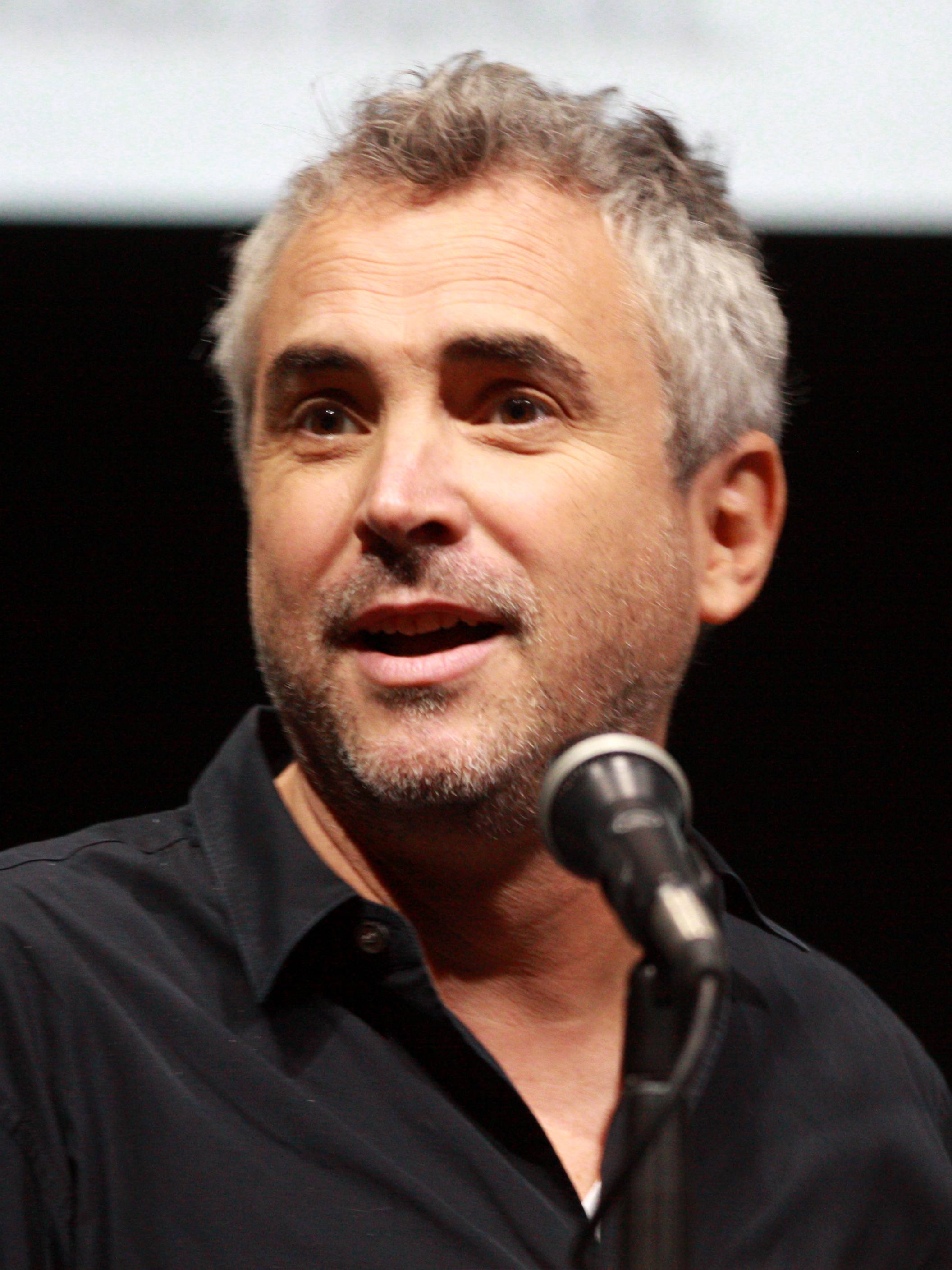
Alfonso Cuarón, Best Director & Best Original Screenplay winner

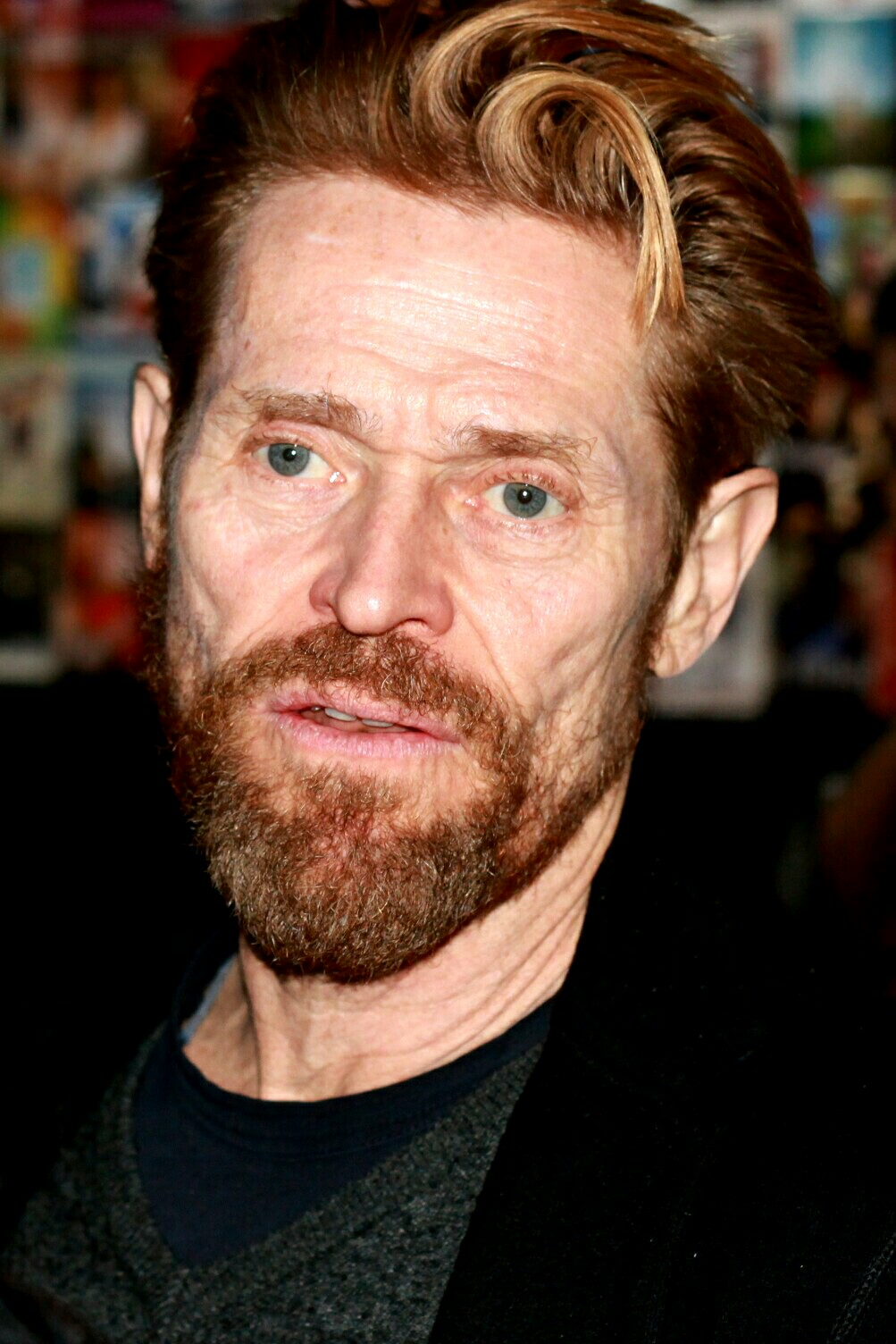
Willem Dafoe, Best Actor in a Motion Picture – Drama winner

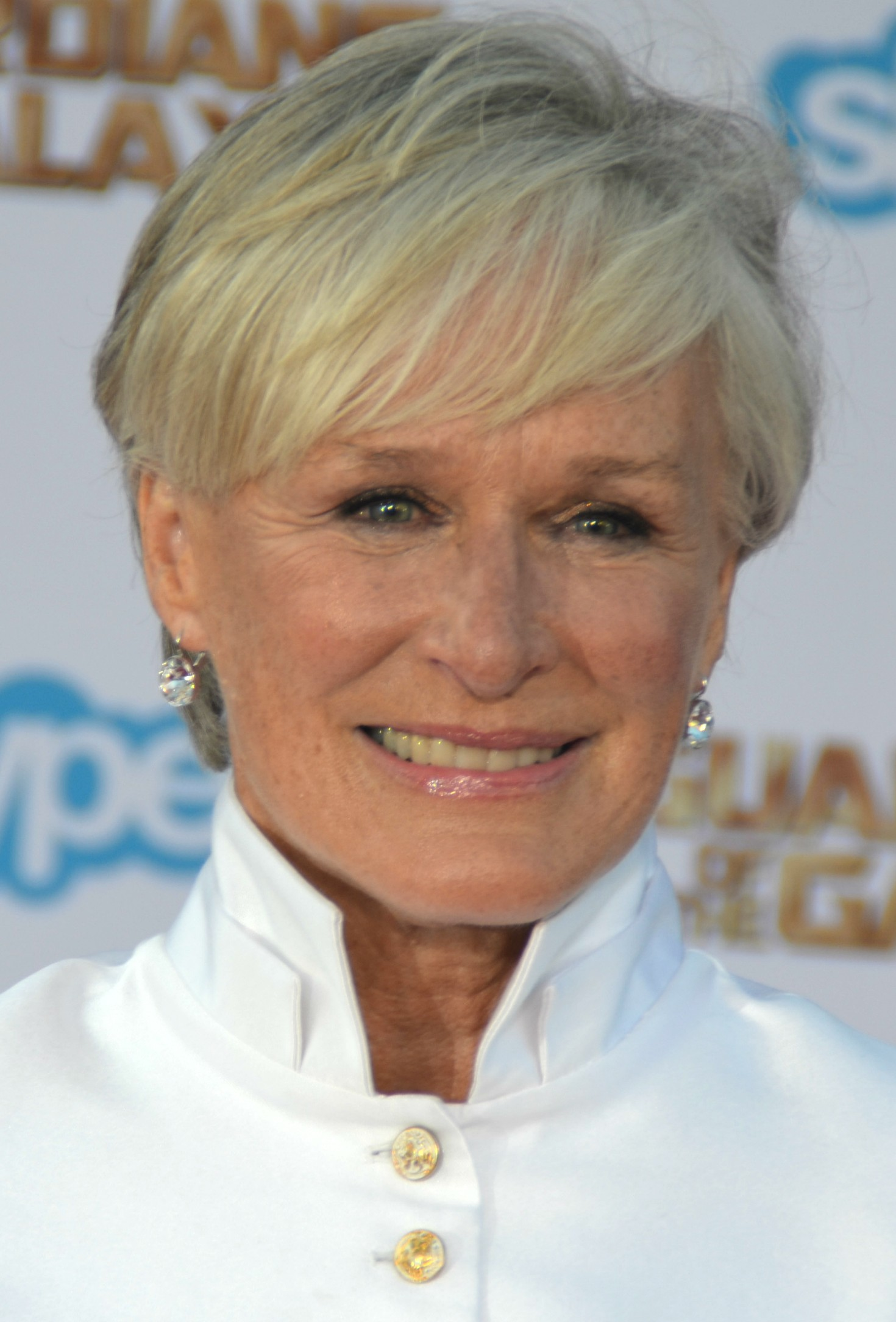
Glenn Close, Best Actress in a Motion Picture – Drama winner

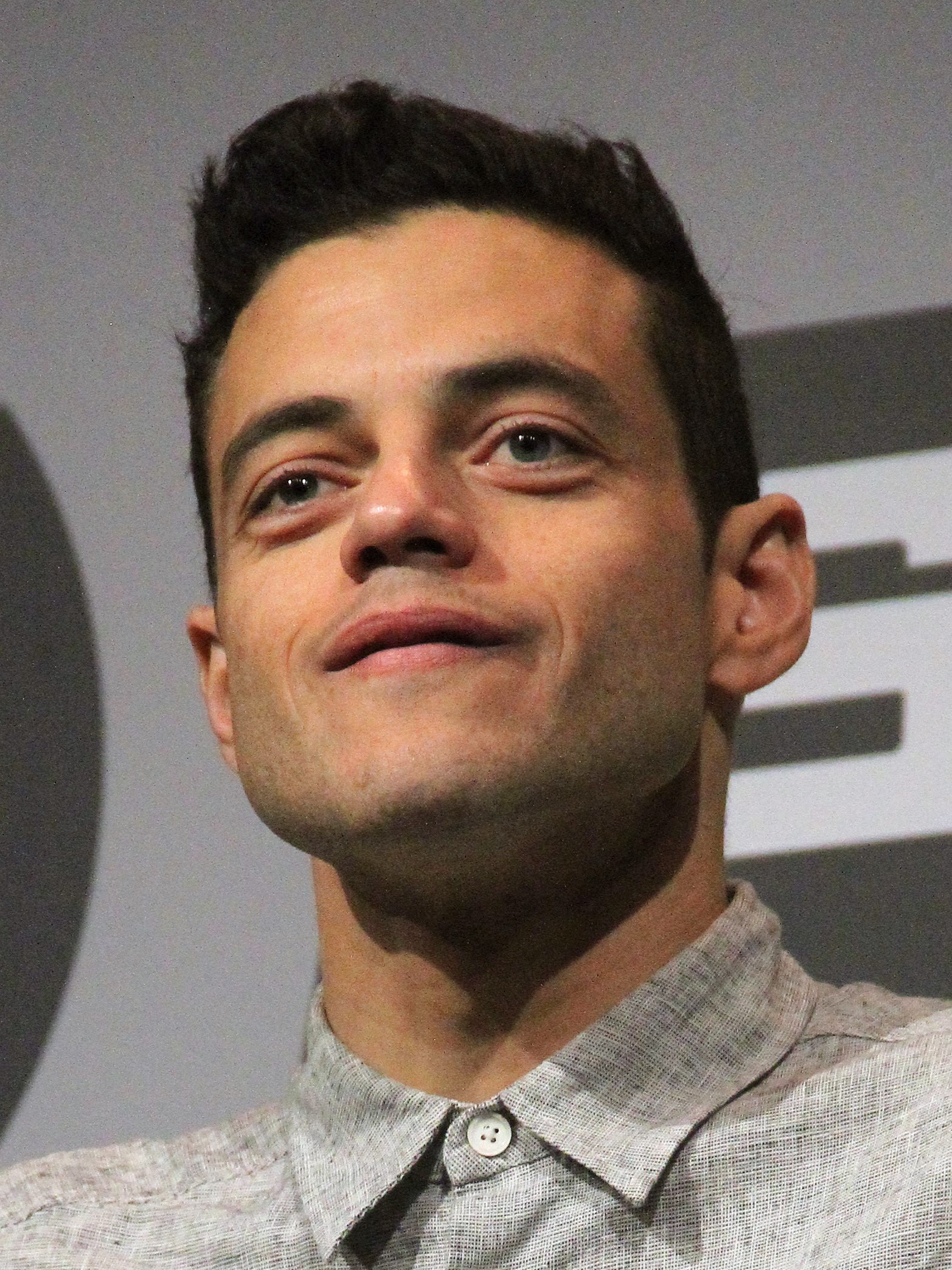
Rami Malek, Best Actor in a Motion Picture – Comedy or Musical winner

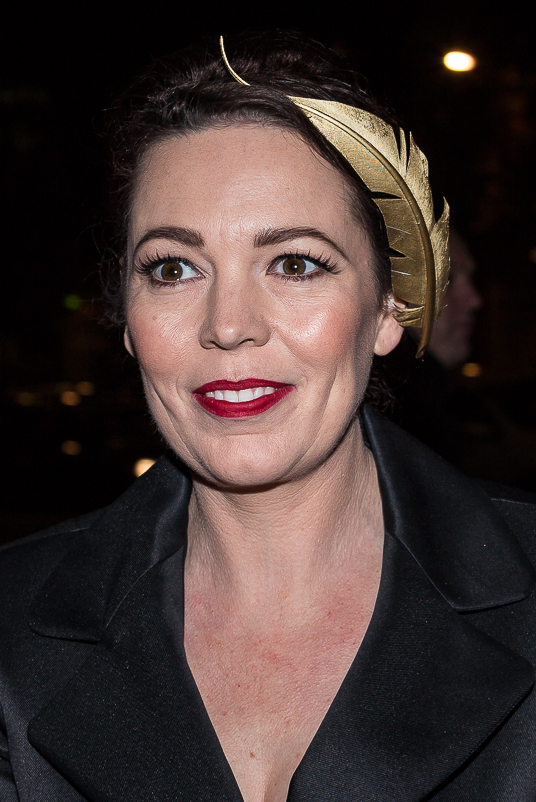
Olivia Colman, Best Actress in a Motion Picture – Comedy or Musical winner

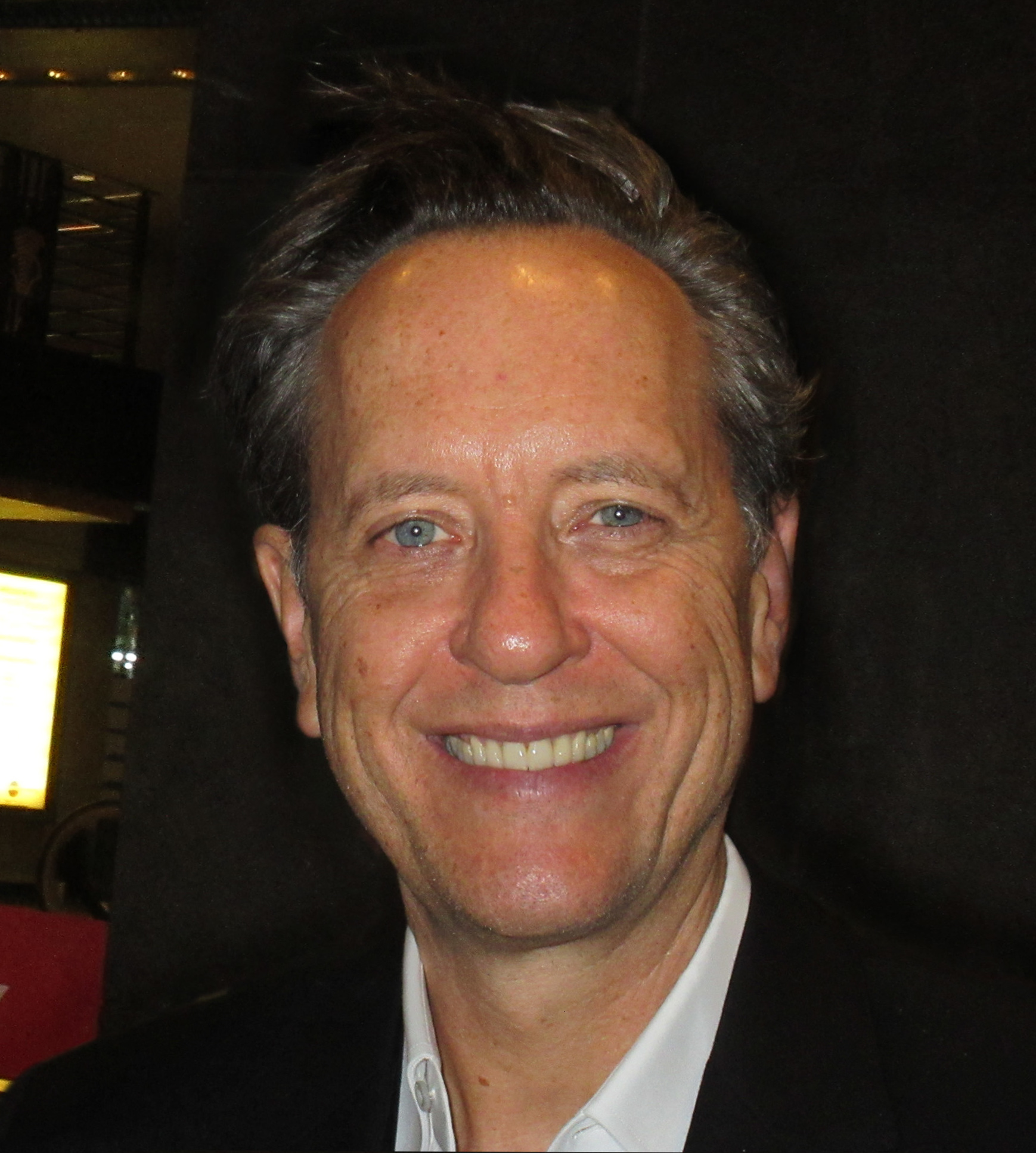
Richard E. Grant, Best Supporting Actor in a Motion Picture winner

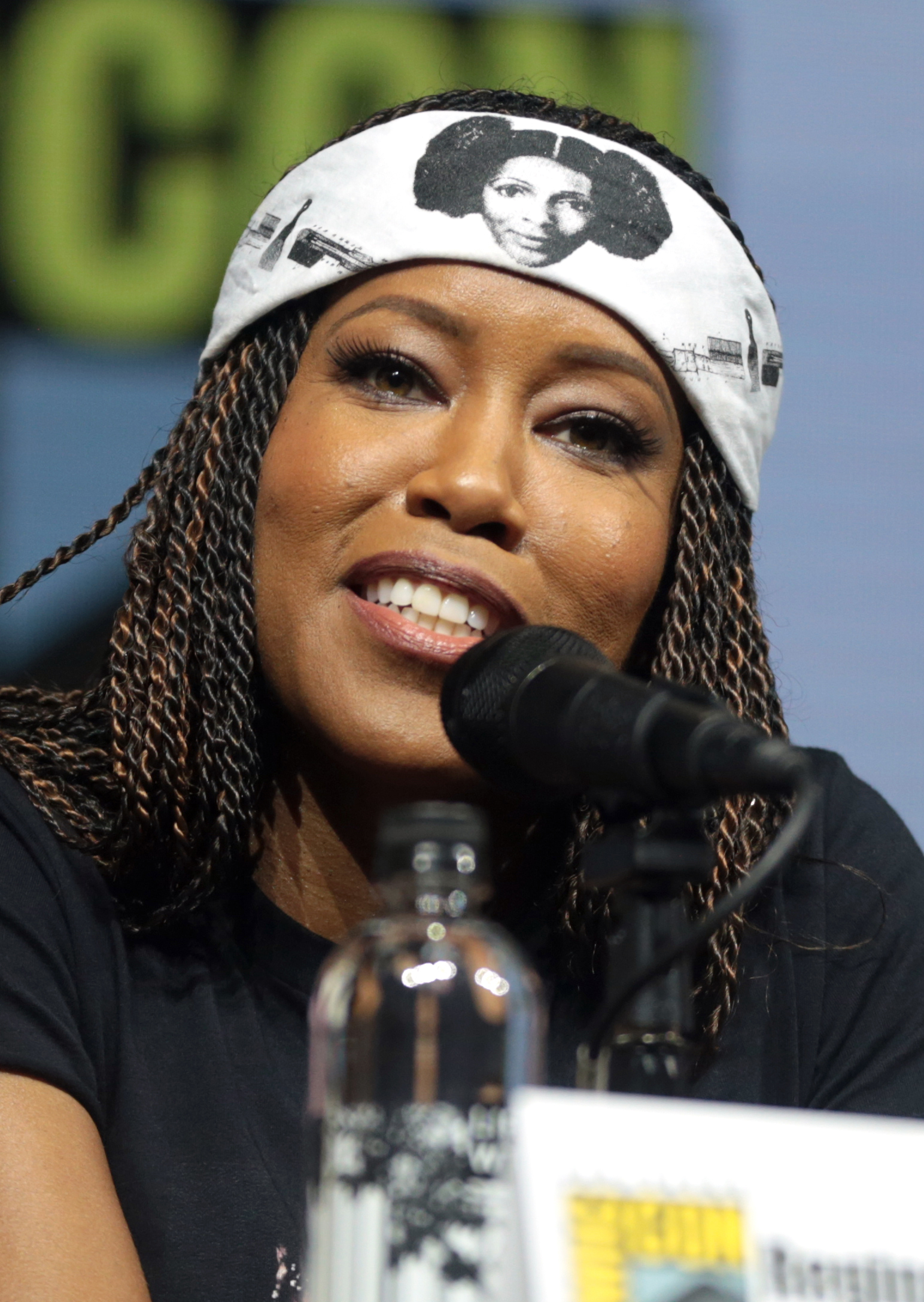
Regina King, Best Supporting Actress in a Motion Picture winner

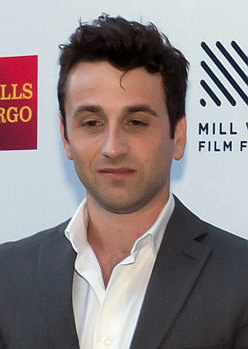
Justin Hurwitz, Best Original Score winner

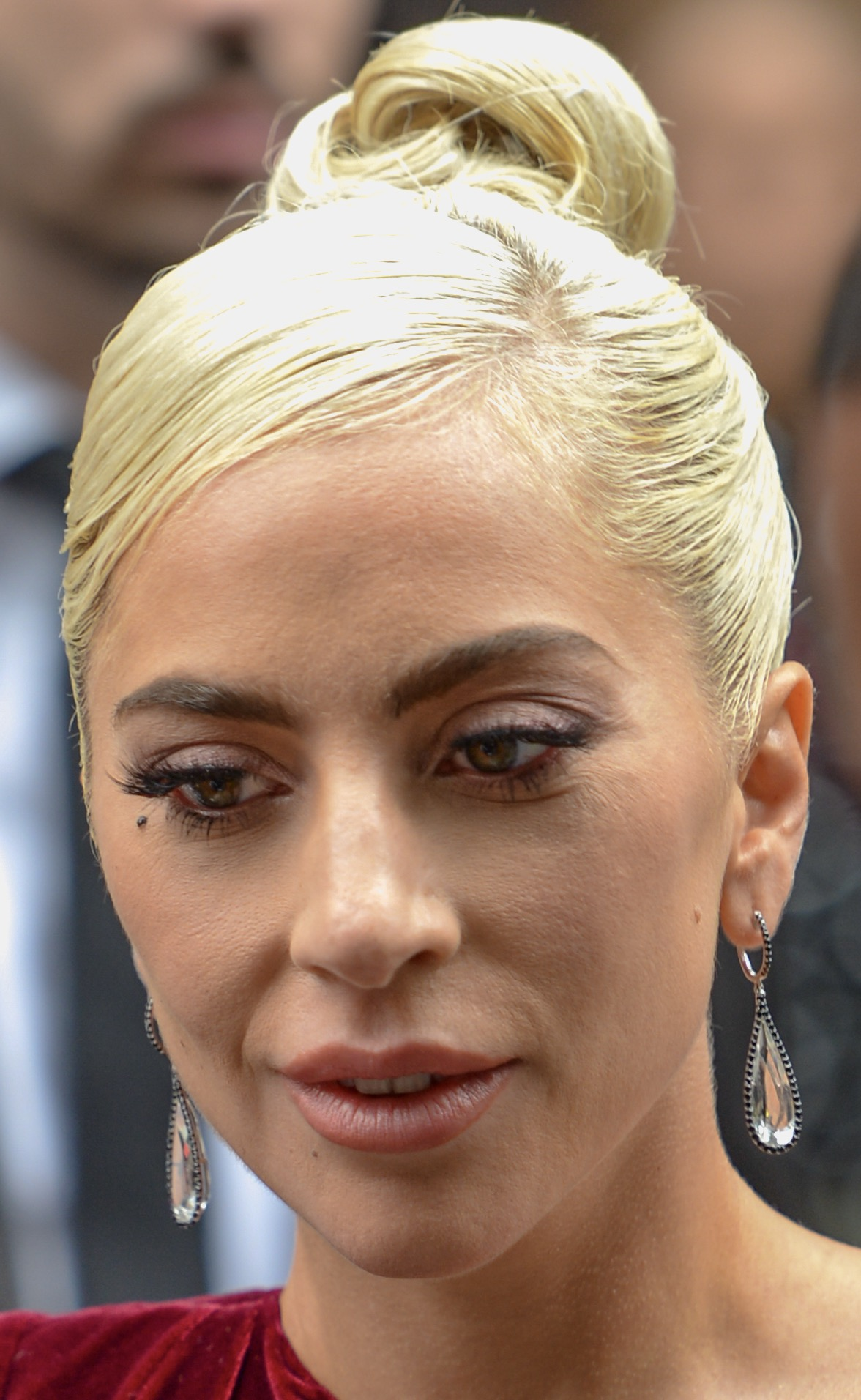
Lady Gaga, Best Original Song co-winner

Winners are listed first and highlighted in bold.

Best Motion Picture – Drama	Best Motion Picture – Comedy/Musical
**If Beale Street Could Talk**; Black Panther; First Man; Hereditary; Mary Queen of Scots; Widows	**A Star Is Born**; Crazy Rich Asians; The Favourite; Green Book; Mary Poppins Returns; Nico, 1988
Best Animated or Mixed Media Film	Best Director
**Isle of Dogs**; Incredibles 2; Liz and the Blue Bird; Mirai; Ralph Breaks the Internet; Ruben Brandt, Collector	**Alfonso Cuarón – Roma**; Bradley Cooper – A Star Is Born; Peter Farrelly – Green Book; Barry Jenkins – If Beale Street Could Talk; Yorgos Lanthimos – The Favourite; Spike Lee – BlacKkKlansman
Best Actor in a Motion Picture, Drama	Best Actress in a Motion Picture, Drama
**Willem Dafoe – At Eternity's Gate as Vincent van Gogh**; Ben Foster – Leave No Trace as Will; Ryan Gosling – First Man as Neil Armstrong; Ethan Hawke – First Reformed as Ernst Toller; Lucas Hedges – Boy Erased as Jared Eamons; Robert Redford – The Old Man & the Gun as Forrest Tucker	**Glenn Close – The Wife as Joan Castleman**; Yalitza Aparicio – Roma as Cleo; Viola Davis – Widows as Veronica Rawlings; Nicole Kidman – Destroyer as Erin Bell; Melissa McCarthy – Can You Ever Forgive Me? as Lee Israel; Rosamund Pike – A Private War as Marie Colvin
Best Actor in a Motion Picture, Comedy/Musical	Best Actress in a Motion Picture, Comedy/Musical
**Rami Malek – Bohemian Rhapsody as Freddie Mercury**; Bradley Cooper – A Star Is Born as Jackson Maine; Lin-Manuel Miranda – Mary Poppins Returns as Jack; Viggo Mortensen – Green Book as Frank "Tony Lip" Vallelonga; Nick Robinson – Love, Simon as Simon Spier; John David Washington – BlacKkKlansman as Ron Stallworth	**Olivia Colman – The Favourite as Anne, Queen of Great Britain**; Emily Blunt – Mary Poppins Returns as Mary Poppins; Trine Dyrholm – Nico, 1988 as Nico; Elsie Fisher – Eighth Grade as Kayla Day; Lady Gaga – A Star Is Born as Ally Campana Maine; Constance Wu – Crazy Rich Asians as Rachel Chu
Best Supporting Actor	Best Supporting Actress
**Richard E. Grant – Can You Ever Forgive Me? as Jack Hock**; Mahershala Ali – Green Book as Don Shirley; Timothée Chalamet – Beautiful Boy as Nic Sheff; Russell Crowe – Boy Erased as Marshall Eamons; Adam Driver – BlacKkKlansman as Flip Zimmerman; Sam Elliott – A Star Is Born as Bobby Maine	**Regina King – If Beale Street Could Talk as Sharon Rivers**; Claire Foy – First Man as Janet Armstrong; Nicole Kidman – Boy Erased as Nancy Eamons; Margot Robbie – Mary Queen of Scots as Queen Elizabeth I; Emma Stone – The Favourite as Abigail Masham, Baroness Masham; Rachel Weisz – The Favourite as Sarah Churchill, Duchess of Marlborough
Best Original Screenplay	Best Adapted Screenplay
**Roma – Alfonso Cuarón**; Eighth Grade – Bo Burnham; The Favourite – Deborah Davis and Tony McNamara; First Reformed – Paul Schrader; Green Book – Nick Vallelonga, Brian Hayes Currie, and Peter Farrelly; A Quiet Place – Scott Beck, John Krasinski, and Bryan Woods	**Can You Ever Forgive Me? – Nicole Holofcener and Jeff Whitty**; BlacKkKlansman – Charlie Wachtel, David Rabinowitz, Kevin Willmott, and Spike Lee; The Death of Stalin – Armando Iannucci, David Schneider, Ian Martin, and Peter Fellows; If Beale Street Could Talk – Barry Jenkins; Leave No Trace – Debra Granik and Anne Rosellini; A Star Is Born – Bradley Cooper and Eric Roth
Best Documentary Film	Best Foreign Language Film
**Minding the Gap**; Crime + Punishment; Free Solo; RBG; Three Identical Strangers; Won't You Be My Neighbor?	**Roma (Mexico)**; The Cakemaker (Israel); Cold War (Poland); The Guilty (Denmark); I Am Not a Witch (United Kingdom); Shoplifters (Japan)
Best Film Editing	Best Cinematography
**Roma – Alfonso Cuarón**; BlacKkKlansman – Barry Alexander Brown; First Man – Tom Cross; If Beale Street Could Talk – Joi McMillon and Nat Sanders; A Star Is Born – Jay Cassidy; Widows – Joe Walker	**A Star Is Born – Matthew Libatique**; Black Panther – Rachel Morrison; Cold War – Łukasz Żal; The Favourite – Robbie Ryan; If Beale Street Could Talk – James Laxton; Roma – Alfonso Cuarón
Best Original Score	Best Original Song
**First Man – Justin Hurwitz**; BlacKkKlansman – Terence Blanchard; Colette – Thomas Adès; If Beale Street Could Talk – Nicholas Britell; The Sisters Brothers – Alexandre Desplat; Widows – Hans Zimmer	"**Shallow" – A Star Is Born**; "All the Stars" – Black Panther; "Can You Imagine That?" – Mary Poppins Returns; "Requiem for a Private War" – A Private War; "Revelation" – Boy Erased; "Strawberries & Cigarettes" – Love, Simon
Best Costume Design	Best Art Direction and Production Design
**The Favourite – Sandy Powell**; Black Panther – Ruth E. Carter; Colette – Andrea Flesch; Fantastic Beasts: The Crimes of Grindelwald – Colleen Atwood; Mary Queen of Scots – Alexandra Byrne; A Star Is Born – Erin Benach	**Mary Poppins Returns – John Myhre**; Black Panther – Hannah Beachler; Fantastic Beasts: The Crimes of Grindelwald – Stuart Craig; The Favourite – Fiona Crombie; First Man – Nathan Crowley; Roma – Eugenio Caballero
Best Visual Effects	Best Sound (Editing and Mixing)
**Black Panther**; Avengers: Infinity War; Fantastic Beasts: The Crimes of Grindelwald; Jurassic World: Fallen Kingdom; Rampage; Ready Player One	**A Quiet Place**; Black Panther; First Man; Mary Poppins Returns; Roma; A Star Is Born
Best Independent Film	
**BlacKkKlansman**; Eighth Grade; First Reformed; Leave No Trace; Private Life; A Private War	

=== Films with multiple nominations ===
Nominations	Films
11	A Star Is Born
9	The Favourite
8	Roma
7	BlacKkKlansman
7	Black Panther
7	First Man
7	If Beale Street Could Talk
6	Mary Poppins Returns
5	Green Book
4	Boy Erased
4	Widows
3	Can You Ever Forgive Me?
3	Eighth Grace
3	Fantastic Beasts: The Crimes of Grindelwald
3	First Reformed
3	Leave No Trace
3	Mary Queen of Scots
3	A Private War
2	Cold War
2	Colette
2	Crazy Rich Asians
2	Love, Simon
2	Nico, 1988
2	A Quiet Place

=== Films with multiple wins ===
Wins	Films
4	Roma
3	A Star Is Born
2	Can You Ever Forgive Me?
2	The Favourite
2	If Beale Street Could Talk

== Television winners and nominees ==
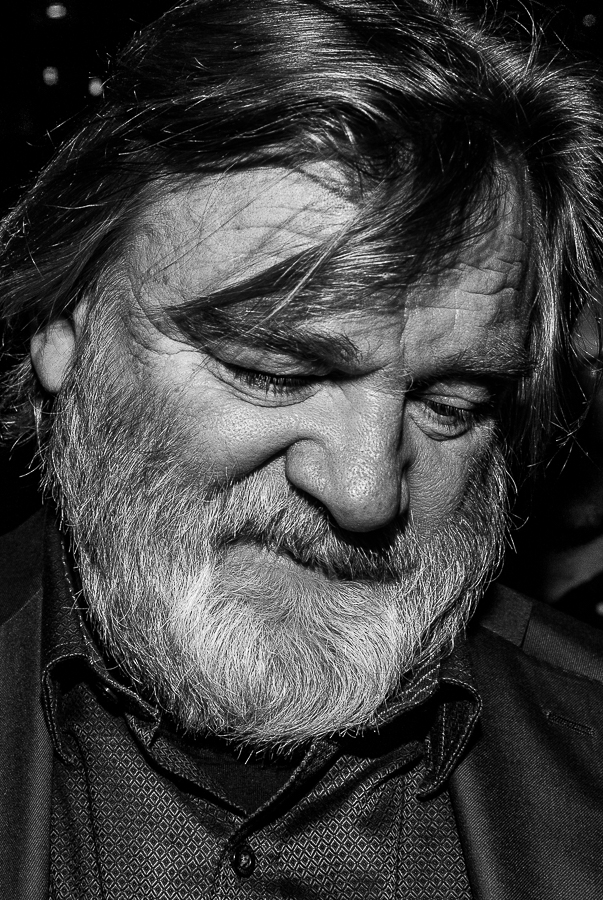
Brendan Gleeson, Best Actor in a Drama/Genre Series winner

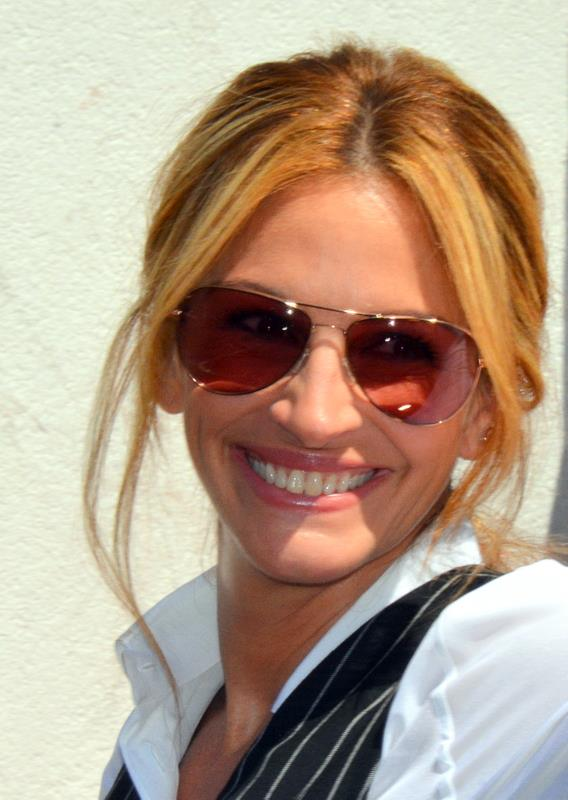
Julia Roberts, Best Actress in a Drama/Genre Series winner

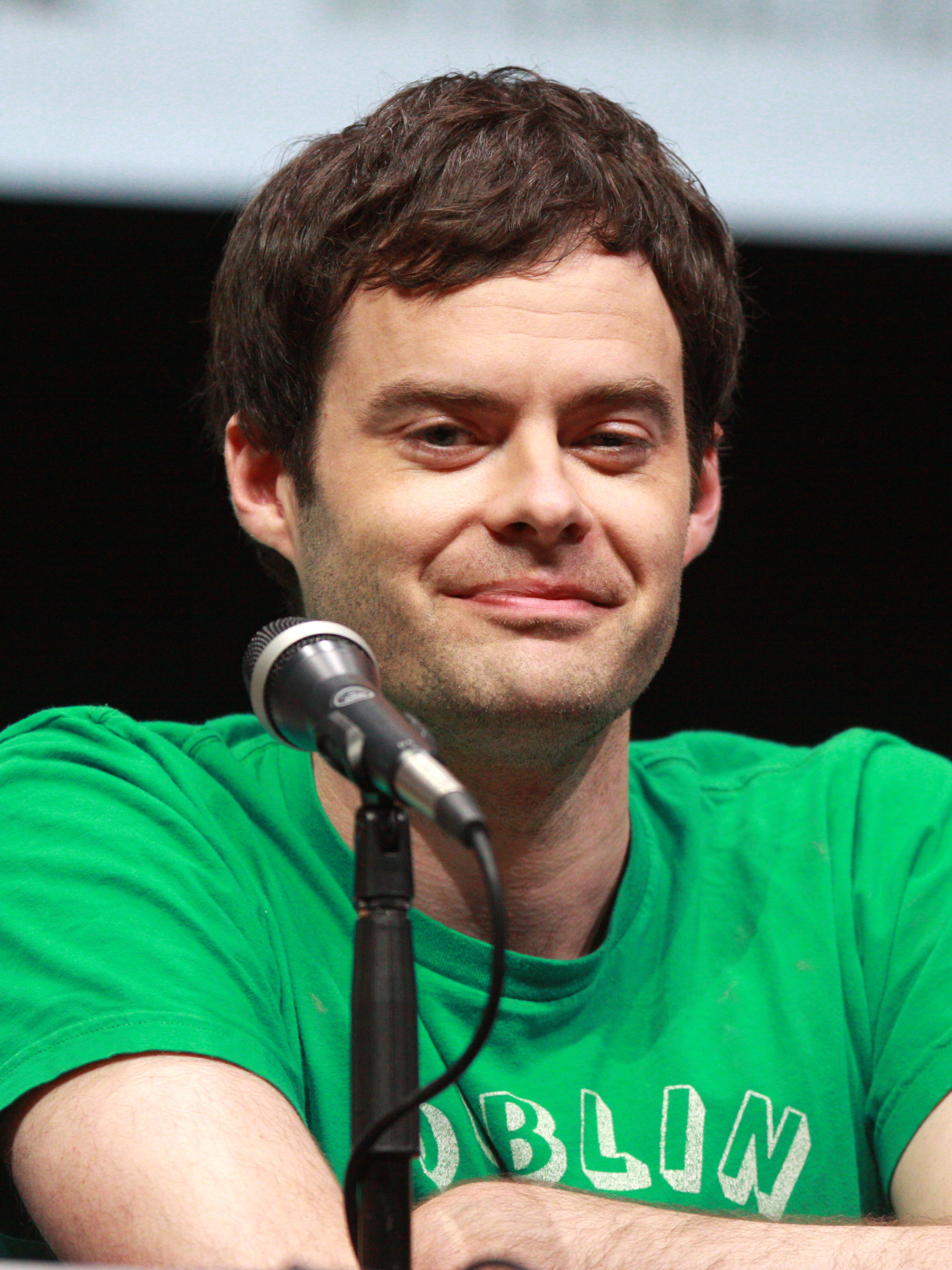
Bill Hader, Best Actor in a Comedy or Musical Series winner

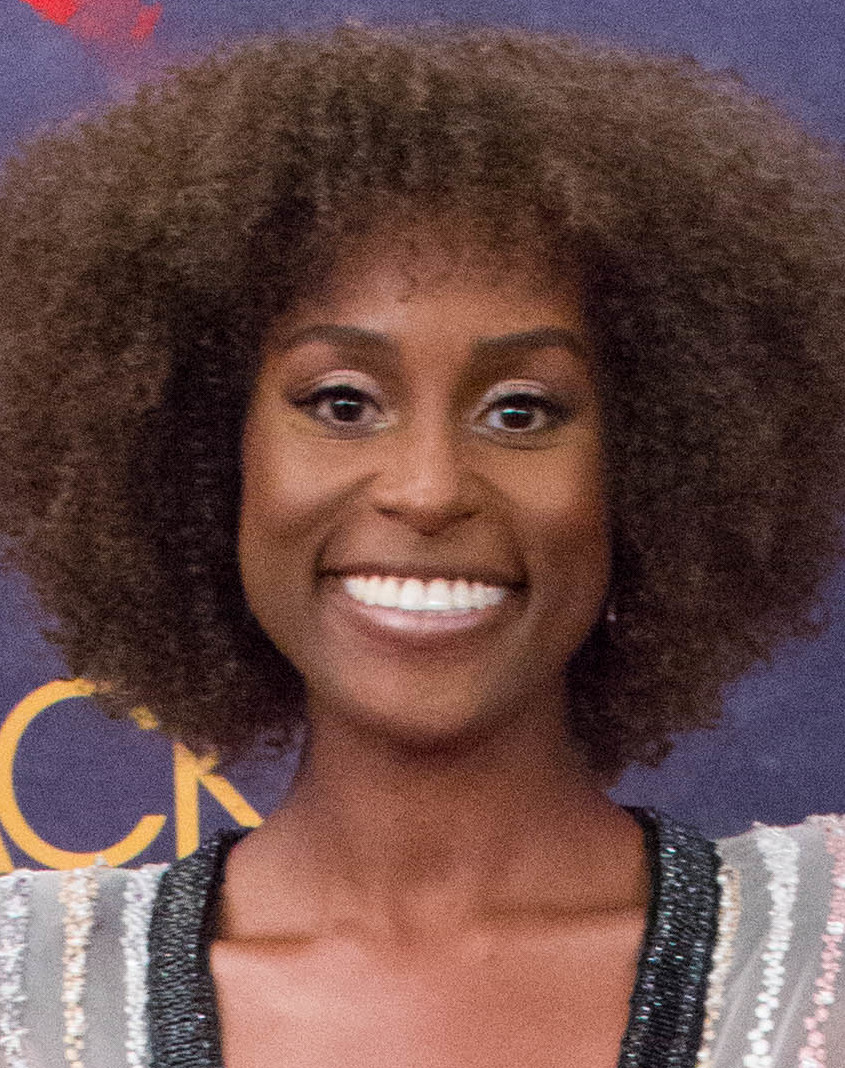
Issa Rae, Best Actress in a Comedy or Musical Series winner

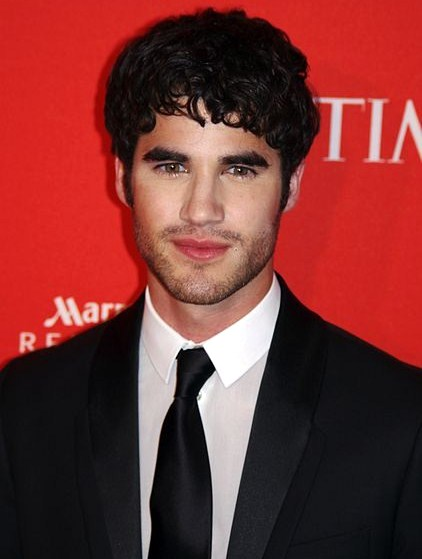
Darren Criss, Best Actor in a Miniseries or Television Film winner

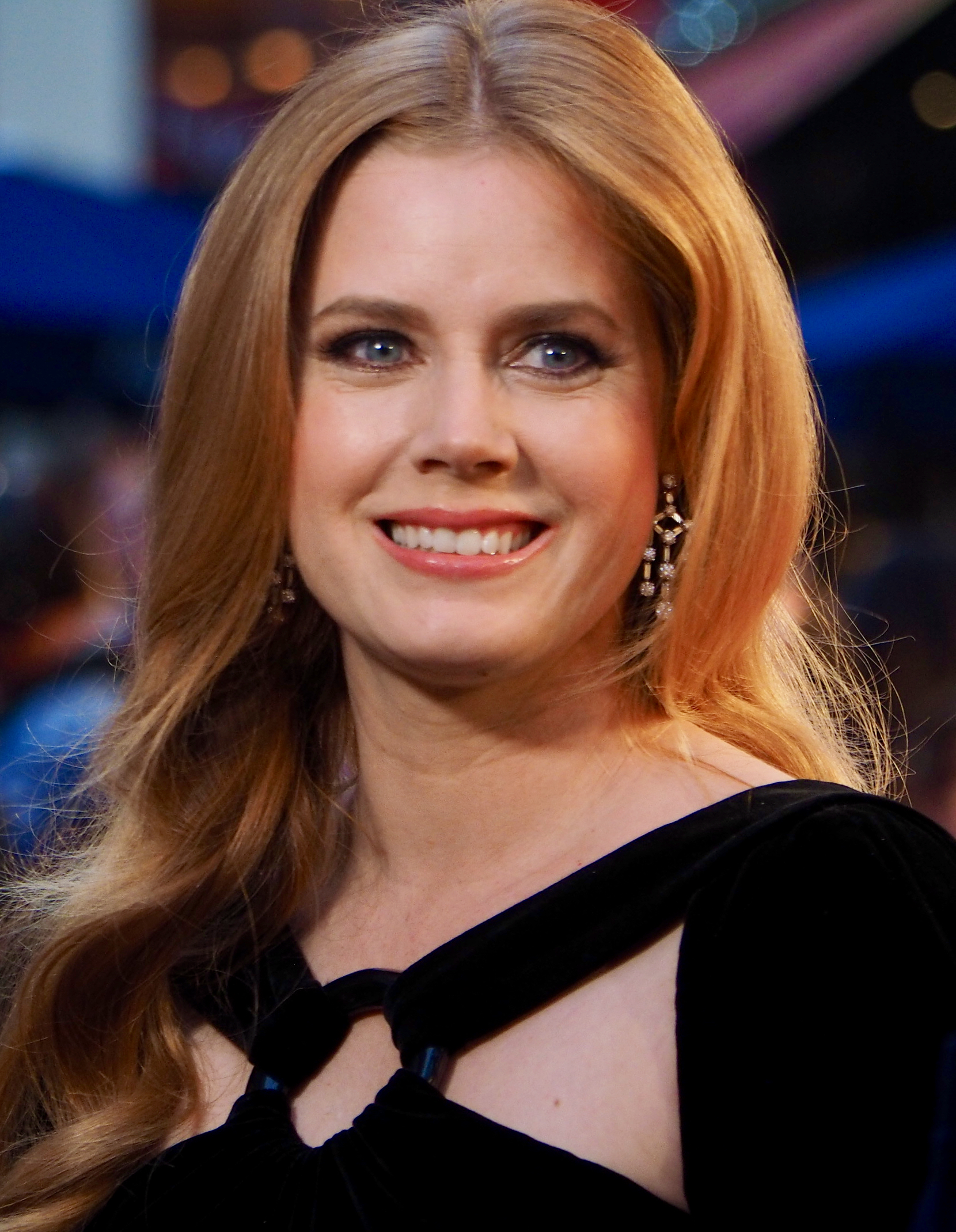
Amy Adams, Best Actress in a Miniseries or Television Film winner

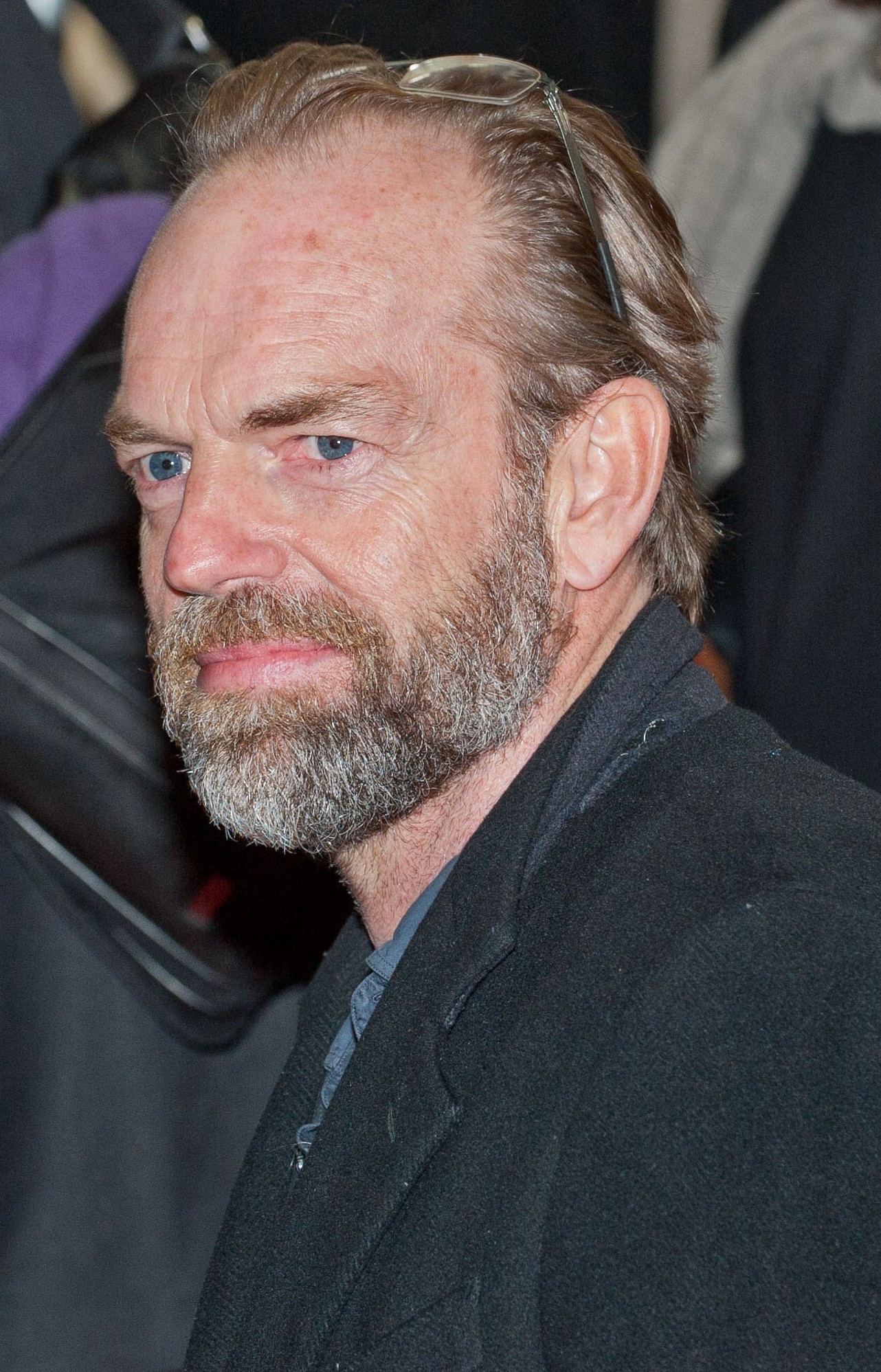
Hugo Weaving, Best Supporting Actor in a Series, Miniseries, or Television Film winner

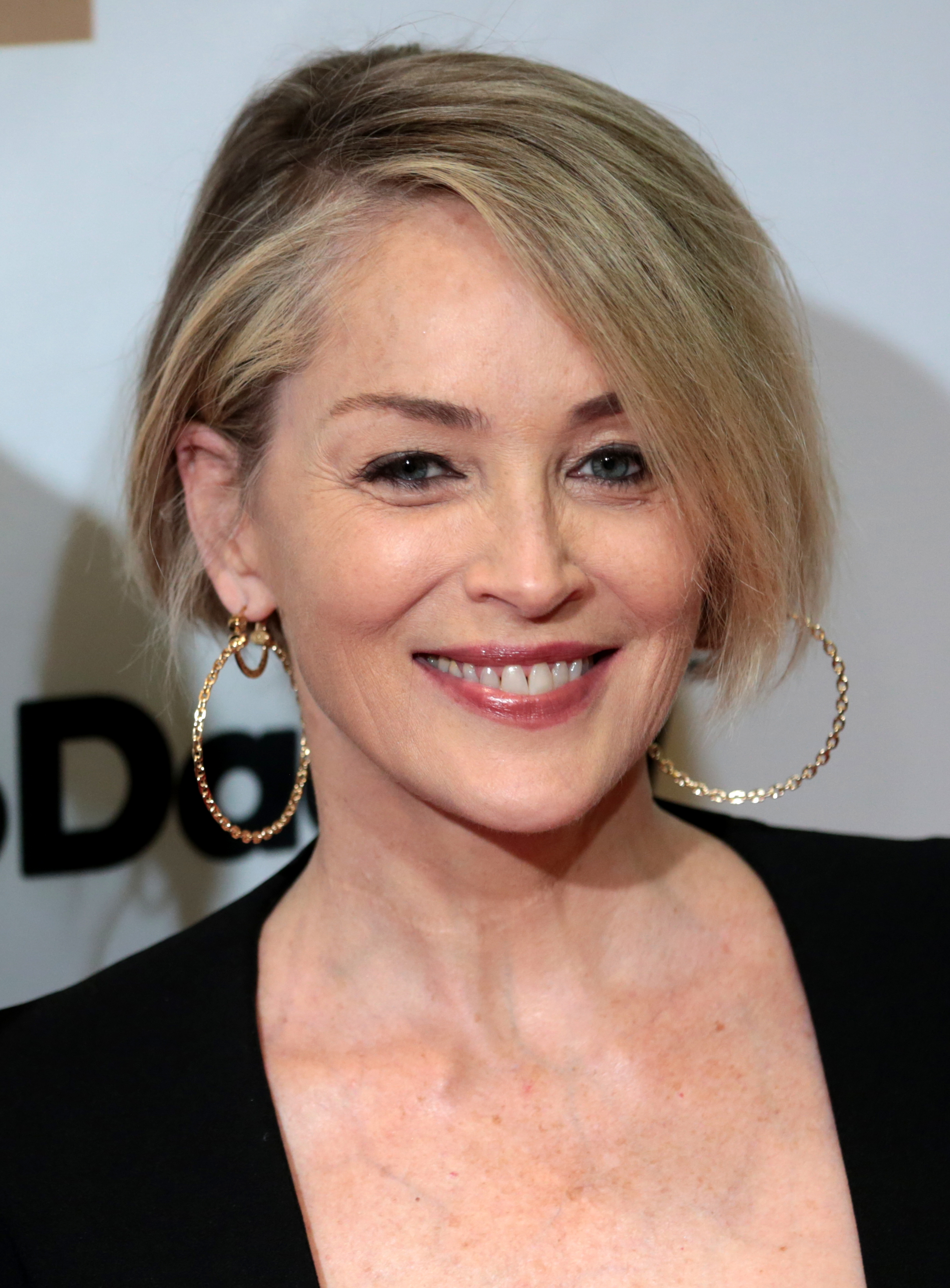
Sharon Stone, Best Supporting Actress in a Series, Miniseries, or Television Film winner

Winners are listed first and highlighted in bold.

Best Drama Series	Best Musical or Comedy Series
**Homecoming – Amazon**; The Bold Type – Freeform; The Handmaid's Tale – Hulu; Mr. Mercedes – AT&T; Succession – HBO; This Is Us – NBC	**Lodge 49 – AMC**; Arrested Development – Netflix; Atlanta – FX; Barry – HBO; Black-ish – ABC; The Good Place – NBC; Insecure – HBO
Best Genre Series	Best Miniseries
**The Terror – AMC**; Castle Rock – Hulu; Counterpart – Starz; Doctor Who – BBC; The Man in the High Castle – Amazon	**The Assassination of Gianni Versace: American Crime Story – FX**; The Looming Tower – Hulu; Patrick Melrose – Showtime; Sharp Objects – HBO; A Very English Scandal – Amazon
Best Actor in a Drama / Genre Series	Best Actress in a Drama / Genre Series
**Brendan Gleeson – Mr. Mercedes as Bill Hodges**; Jason Bateman – Ozark as Marty Byrde; Bob Odenkirk – Better Call Saul as Saul Goodman; Matthew Rhys – The Americans as Philip Jennings; J. K. Simmons – Counterpart as Howard Silk; Billy Bob Thornton – Goliath as Billy McBride	**Julia Roberts – Homecoming as Heidi Bergman**; Elisabeth Moss – The Handmaid's Tale as Offred / June Osborne; Sandra Oh – Killing Eve as Eve Polastri; Keri Russell – The Americans as Elizabeth Jennings; Jodie Whittaker – Doctor Who as The Doctor
Best Actor in a Musical or Comedy Series	Best Actress in a Musical or Comedy Series
**Bill Hader – Barry as Barry Berkman / Barry Block**; Anthony Anderson – Black-ish as Andre "Dre" Johnson Sr.; Ted Danson – The Good Place as Michael; Donald Glover – Atlanta as Earnest "Earn" Marks; William H. Macy – Shameless as Frank Gallagher; Thomas Middleditch – Silicon Valley as Richard Hendricks	**Issa Rae – Insecure as Issa Dee**; Alison Brie – GLOW as Ruth "Zoya the Destroya" Wilder; Christina Hendricks – Good Girls as Beth Boland; Ellie Kemper – Unbreakable Kimmy Schmidt as Kimmy Schmidt; Niecy Nash – Claws as Desna Simms; Tracee Ellis Ross – Black-ish as Rainbow "Bow" Johnson
Best Actor in a Miniseries or TV Film	Best Actress in a Miniseries or TV Film
**Darren Criss – The Assassination of Gianni Versace: American Crime Story as Andrew Cunanan**; Daniel Brühl – The Alienist as Laszlo Kreizler; Benedict Cumberbatch – Patrick Melrose as Patrick Melrose; Jeff Daniels – The Looming Tower as John O'Neill; Hugh Grant – A Very English Scandal as Jeremy Thorpe; Jared Harris – The Terror as Francis Crozier	**Amy Adams – Sharp Objects as Camille Preaker**; Laura Dern – The Tale as Jennifer Fox; Dakota Fanning – The Alienist as Sara Howard; Julia Roberts – Homecoming as Heidi Bergman; Emma Stone – Maniac as Annie Landsberg
Best Supporting Actor in a Series, Miniseries or TV Film	Best Supporting Actress in a Series, Miniseries or TV Film
**Hugo Weaving – Patrick Melrose as David Melrose**; Mark Duplass – Goliath as Tom Wyatt; John Macmillan – King Lear as Edmund; Édgar Ramírez – The Assassination of Gianni Versace: American Crime Story as Gianni Versace; Paul Ready – The Terror as Harry Goodsir; Ben Whishaw – A Very English Scandal as Norman Josiffe / Norman Scott	**Sharon Stone – Mosaic as Olivia Lake**; Penélope Cruz – The Assassination of Gianni Versace: American Crime Story as Donatella Versace; Jennifer Jason Leigh – Patrick Melrose as Eleanor Melrose; Justine Lupe – Mr. Mercedes as Holly Gibney; Nive Nielsen – The Terror as Lady Silence; Emma Thompson – King Lear as Goneril
Best Television Film
**The Tale – HBO**; Cargo – Netflix; Her Only Choice – BET; King Lear – Amazon

=== Series with multiple nominations ===
Nominations	Series
4	The Assassination of Gianni Versace: American Crime Story
4	Patrick Melrose
4	The Terror
3	Black-ish
3	Homecoming
3	King Lear
3	Mr. Mercedes
3	A Very English Scandal
2	The Alienist
2	The Americans
2	Atlanta
2	Barry
2	Counterpart
2	Doctor Who
2	Goliath
2	The Good Place
2	The Handmaid's Tale
2	Insecure
2	The Looming Tower
2	Sharp Objects
2	The Tale

=== Series with multiple wins ===
Wins	Series
2	The Assassination of Gianni Versace: American Crime Story
2	Homecoming
