= Lear =

Lear or Leir may refer to:

== Acronyms ==
- Liga de Escritores y Artistas Revolucionarios, a Mexican association of revolutionary artists and writers
- Low Energy Ion Ring, an ion pre-accelerator of the Large Hadron Collider at CERN
  - Low Energy Antiproton Ring, the former name and function of the Low Energy Ion Ring
- Rapeseed, a member of the family Brassicaceae cultivated for its oil-rich seed

== Arts and entertainment ==
- King Lear, a tragedy by William Shakespeare based on the legend of Leir of Britain
- King Leir, an anonymous 1594 play based on the legend of Leir of Britain
- Lear (play), a 1971 Edward Bond play
- Lear (opera), a 1978 opera by Aribert Reimann
- The Last Lear, a 2007 Indian play
- The Lears, a 2017 American comedy-drama film
- The Yiddish King Lear, an 1892 play
- Lear's (1988–1994), a monthly women's magazine

== People ==
- Leir of Britain, a legendary king of the Britons
- Lear (1808 cricketer)

=== Surname ===
- Alan W. Lear (1953–2008), Scottish writer of science fiction and horror
- Amanda Lear, French singer
- Andrew Lear (born 1958), American classicist
- Ben Lear (1879–1966), United States Army general
- Beth Lear, American politician
- Bill Lear (1902–1978), American engineer, businessman and inventor
- Edward Lear (1812–1888), English author and artist
- Eliot Lear, member of the Internet Engineering Task Force
- Evelyn Lear (1926–2012), American operatic soprano
- Frances Lear (1923–1996), American magazine publisher
- Hal Lear (1935–2016), American basketball player
- Jonathan Lear (1948–2025), American philosopher and psychoanalyst
- Les Lear (1918–1979), National (U.S.) and Canadian Football League player and coach
- Louise Lear (born 1967), BBC Weather presenter
- Moya Lear (1915–2001), American businesswoman
- Nicholas Lear (c.1826–1902), American Civil War Medal of Honor recipient
- Norman Lear (1922–2023), American television writer and producer
- Peter Lear (disambiguation)
- Roger Leir (1934–2014), American podiatric surgeon and ufologist
- Thomas Lear (disambiguation)
- Tobias Lear (1762–1816), personal secretary to President George Washington

== Other uses ==
- Lear Corporation, an American automotive supplier
- LearAvia Lear Fan, an American turboprop business aircraft designed in the 1970s
- Learjet, an aircraft series
- Leir (Marvel Comics), a fictional character in the Marvel universe
- Lear (crater), a crater on Oberon, a moon of Uranus
- Lear, County Londonderry, a townland in Cumber Upper, County Londonderry, Northern Ireland
- Lear, a thickened sauce used in Battalia pie and other dishes in English Early Modern cooking
- Lear, a character in Pokémon Masters EX

== See also ==
- Children of Lir, an Irish legend
- King Lear (disambiguation)
- LEA (disambiguation)
- Lear's macaw, a rare bird named after Edward Lear
- Lir (Irish), mythological gods of the sea
- Llŷr (Welsh), mythological gods of the sea
- Van Lear (disambiguation)
- Laer
