= Thomas Lear =

Thomas Lear may refer to:

- Sir Thomas Lear, 1st Baronet of the Lear baronets
- Thomas Van Lear, American politician, mayor of Minneapolis

== See also ==
- Lear (disambiguation)
