= Caroline Lennon =

Irish actor

Caroline Lennon is an Irish actor and voice artist known for her portrayal of Siobhan Hathaway in BBC Radio 4's long-running soap The Archers and for other stage, film, television and voice work.

Lennon was born in County Wicklow, Ireland, and trained at the Bristol Old Vic Theatre School. She performed at many theatres in the UK including Nottingham Playhouse, the Savoy Theatre and Bristol Old Vic.

She played Siobhan Hathaway (later Siobhan Donovan) in The Archers between 1999 and the character's death from cancer in 2007, and again in 2020 when it transpired that Siobhan had recorded a message for her son Ruari's 18th birthday, left on a CD in the care of her sister. (Siobhan had come to the village as the wife of doctor Tim Hathaway, but had an affair with central character Brian Aldridge; after she left the village and was diagnosed with terminal cancer, her child Ruairi came to live with his father Brian and stepmother Jennifer.)

Lennon played Goneril in the 1999 film King Lear starring and directed by Brian Blessed, and her television work has included roles in Casualty, London's Burning and The 10%ers. She has recorded over 300 audio books, including Roddy Doyle's 1996 novel The Woman Who Walked into Doors which she discussed in a Sunday Times article. Other voice work includes the narration of a 2019 video produced by the Royal Mail's Address Management Unit to celebrate the 60th anniversary of the introduction of UK postcodes.

Lennon has recorded audiobooks of Peter Tremayne's Sister Fidelma mysteries, gaining her the nickname "The Voice of Fidelma".
