= Cunedagius =

Legendary king of the Britons

Duke of Cornwall
- Predecessor: Henwin, Duke of Cornwall
- Successor: Rivallo

King of South Britain
- Reign: c. 850BCE
- Predecessor: Cordelia
- Successor: Rivallo

King of North Britain
- Reign: c. 850BCE
- Predecessor: Marganus I
- Successor: Rivallo
- Issue: Rivallo
- Father: Henwin, Duke of Cornwall
- Mother: Regan

Cunedagius (Latinized form; Welsh: Cunedda) was a legendary king of the Britons, as recounted by Geoffrey of Monmouth. He came to power in 850BC.

He was the son of Henwin, Duke of Cornwall, and Regan, the daughter of King Leir.

Cunedagius, grandson of Leir, despised the rule of his aunt Cordelia. With the help of his cousin Marganus, Cunedagius took over the kingdom from Cordelia and ruled half of it. Following Cordelia's Suicide, Cunedagius came to rule the region of Britain southwest of the Humber.

Two years after they split the island, Marganus invaded Cornwall and destroyed much of the land. Cunedagius met him in battle and defeated him. Marganus fled throughout Britain until he was cornered in Wales. Cunedagius killed him and became king of all of Britain. He ruled all of Britain for 33 years and was succeeded by his son Rivallo.

Geoffrey synchronizes Cunedagius' reign with the ministry of the Jewish prophet Isaiah and the founding of Rome by Romulus and Remus. Both events are dated to the 8th century BC.

== Later tradition ==
Cunedagius and Marganus' conflict is mentioned twice in Thomas Norton and Thomas Sackville's play Gorboduc (1561), as a warning against the possibility of civil strife: "Morgan slaine did yeld his conquered parte unto his cosins sworde in Camberland" (Act I, Scene II); "the cruell sworde bereft Morgan his life with cosyns hand" (Act III, Scene I).

Legendary titles
Preceded by Henwin	Duke of Cornwall	Succeeded by Rivallo
Preceded by Cordelia	King of South Britain	Succeeded by Rivallo
Preceded by Marganus I	King of North Britain	Succeeded by Rivallo
