= Peter Lear =

Peter Lear may refer to:

- Sir Peter Lear, 1st Baronet, of the Lear baronets
- Peter Lear, pen name of Peter Lovesey

== See also ==
- Lear (surname)
