= Marganus =

Marganus I

King of North Britain
- Predecessor: Cordelia
- Successor: Cunedagius
- Father: Maglurus, Duke of Albany
- Mother: Goneril

Marganus (Welsh: Margan) was a legendary king of the Britons as accounted by Geoffrey of Monmouth. He came to power in 850BC.

He was the son of Maglaurus, Duke of Albany, and Goneril, the daughter of King Leir.

Marganus, grandson of Leir, despised the rule of his aunt Cordelia in Britain. With the help of his cousin Cunedagius, Marganus took over the kingdom from Cordelia and ruled half of it. Following Cordelia's suicide, Marganus came to rule the region of Britain northeast of the Humber.

Marganus was eldest male heir of Leir and, influenced by his peers, became discontent with ruling only half of Britain. He began a scorched earth march through Cornwall until reaching the army of Cunedagius. Cunedagius defeated Marganus and Marganus fled. Cunedagius followed him throughout Britain until cornering him in Wales. There, Cunedagius killed Marganus and became king of all Britain. He named the place Margon in honour of his cousin.

== Later tradition ==
Marganus and Cunedagius' conflict is mentioned twice in Thomas Norton and Thomas Sackville's play Gorboduc (1561), as a warning against the possibility of civil strife: "Morgan slaine did yeld his conquered parte unto his cosins sworde in Camberland" (Act I, Scene II); "the cruell sworde bereft Morgan his life with cosyns hand" (Act III, Scene I).

Legendary titles
Preceded by Cordelia	King of North Britain	Succeeded by Cunedagius
