= King Lear (1999 film) =

1999 film by Brian Blessed

- Directed by: Brian Blessed; Tony Rotherham (additional segments)
- Release date: 1999
- Running time: 180 minutes
- Country: United Kingdom
- Language: English

King Lear is a 1999 adaptation of William Shakespeare's play of the same name. The film stars Brian Blessed (who also co-directed the film, along with Tony Rotherham) in the title role. Apart from Peter Brook's King Lear in 1971, it is the only feature-length film adaptation to preserve Shakespeare's verse. Yvonne Griggs, in Shakespeare's King Lear: A close study of the relationship between text and film (2009), characterised it as "a very stilted costume drama".

== Cast ==
- Brian Blessed as King Lear
- Hildegarde Neil as the Fool
- Phillipa Peak as Cordelia - King's good daughter
- Paul Curran as King of France - Cordelia's husband
- Claire Laurie as Regan - King's vengeful daughter
- Graham McTavish as Duke of Albany - Regan's husband
- Caroline Lennon as Goneril - King's vengeful daughter
- Mark Denny as Duke of Cornwall - Goneril's husband
- Robert Whelan as Earl of Glouster - Blinded by Cornwell
- Jason Riddington as Edmund - Glouster's evil bastard son
- Mark Burgess as Edgar - Glouster's legitimate son
- Iain Stuart Robertson as Earl of Kent - King's servant

== See also ==
- List of historical drama films
