= Cordelia (King Lear) =

Shakespearian character

- King Lear character
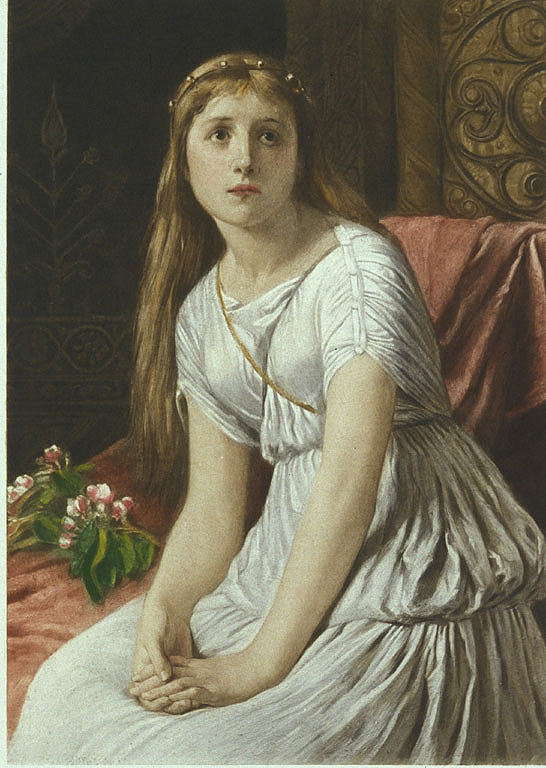
- Cordelia, by William Frederick Yeames
- Created by: William Shakespeare

In-universe information
- Family: Lear (father); Goneril (sister); Regan (sister)
- Spouse: King of France

Cordelia is a fictional character in William Shakespeare's tragic play King Lear. Cordelia is the youngest of King Lear's three daughters and his favorite. After her elderly father offers her the opportunity to profess her love to him in return for one-third of the land in his kingdom, she replies that she loves him "according to her bond" and she is punished for the majority of the play.

== Origin ==
Shakespeare had numerous resources to consult while writing King Lear. The oldest source in print was Geoffrey of Monmouth's The History of the Kings of Britain (c. 1136). This is the earliest written record of Cordelia. Here she is depicted as Queen Cordelia.

== Role in play ==
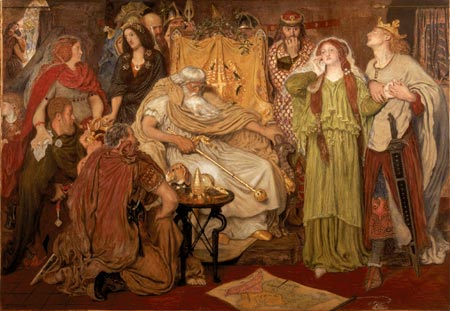
Ford Madox Brown, Cordelia's Portion

=== Introduction ===
In Shakespeare's King Lear, Cordelia is briefly on stage during Act 1, Scene 1. Her father Lear exiles her as a response to her honesty when he asks for professions of love from his three daughters to determine how to divide the lands of his kingdom between them. Cordelia's sisters, Goneril and Regan, give deceitfully lavish speeches professing their love, flattering his vanity. Cordelia, seeing right through her sisters' feigned professions of love, refuses to do the same. Lear deems her answer ("Love, and be silent" 1.1.62) as too simple. Lear asks her, "What can you say to draw / A third more opulent than your sisters? Speak." (1.1.84–5). Cordelia replies, "Nothing, my lord." (1.1.86). She continues, "Unhappy that I am, I cannot heave / My heart into my mouth. I love your majesty / According to my bond; no more nor less." (1.1 90–2). Unlike her father and sisters, Cordelia is able to differentiate love from property. Feeling outraged and humiliated that Cordelia will not publicly lavish love on him, Lear banishes Cordelia from the kingdom and disinherits her. The Earl of Kent objects to her treatment, and is subsequently banished as well. Her two suitors, the Duke of Burgundy and the King of France, are then summoned. The Duke of Burgundy withdraws his suit upon hearing that she has been disinherited, but the King of France was impressed by her honesty and agrees to marry her. She leaves with him and does not return until Act 4, Scene 4.

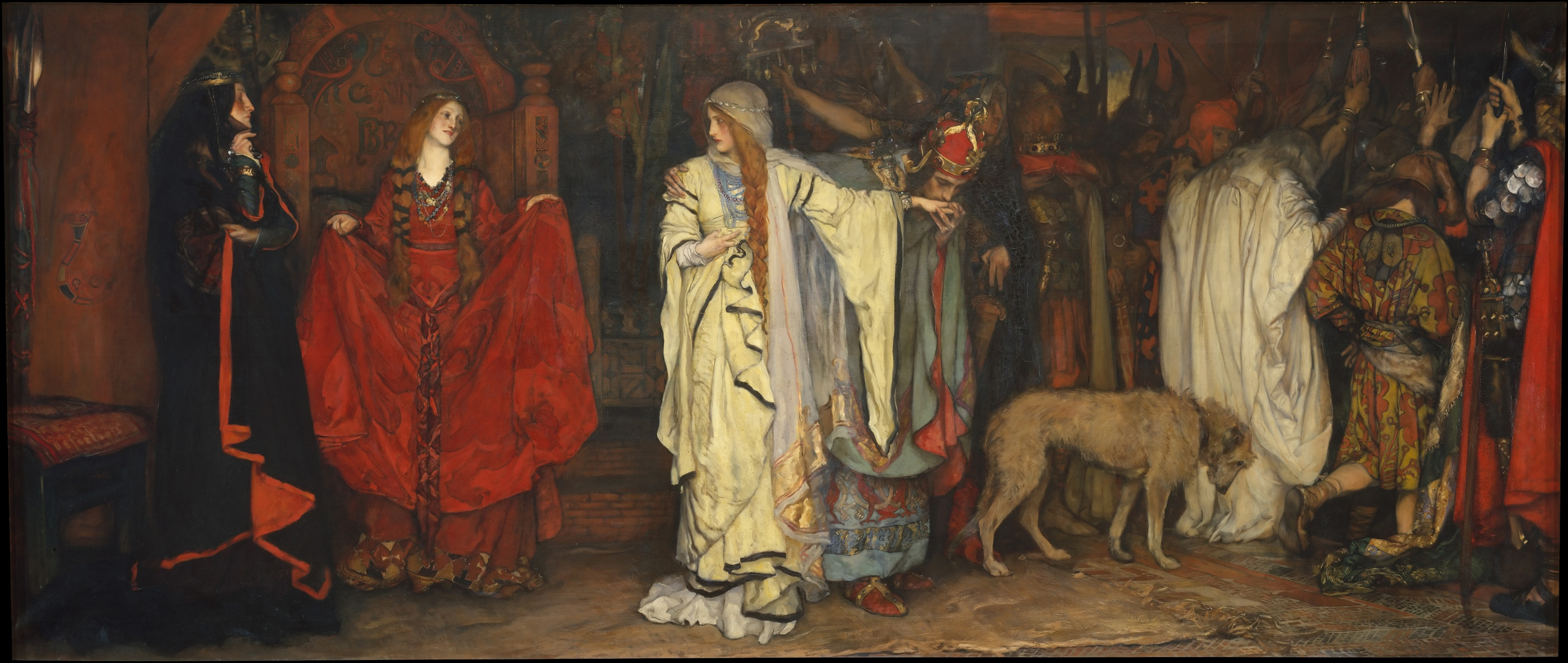
Edwin Austin Abbey (1852–1911) Cordelia's Farewell, King Lear, Act I, Scene I

=== The ending ===
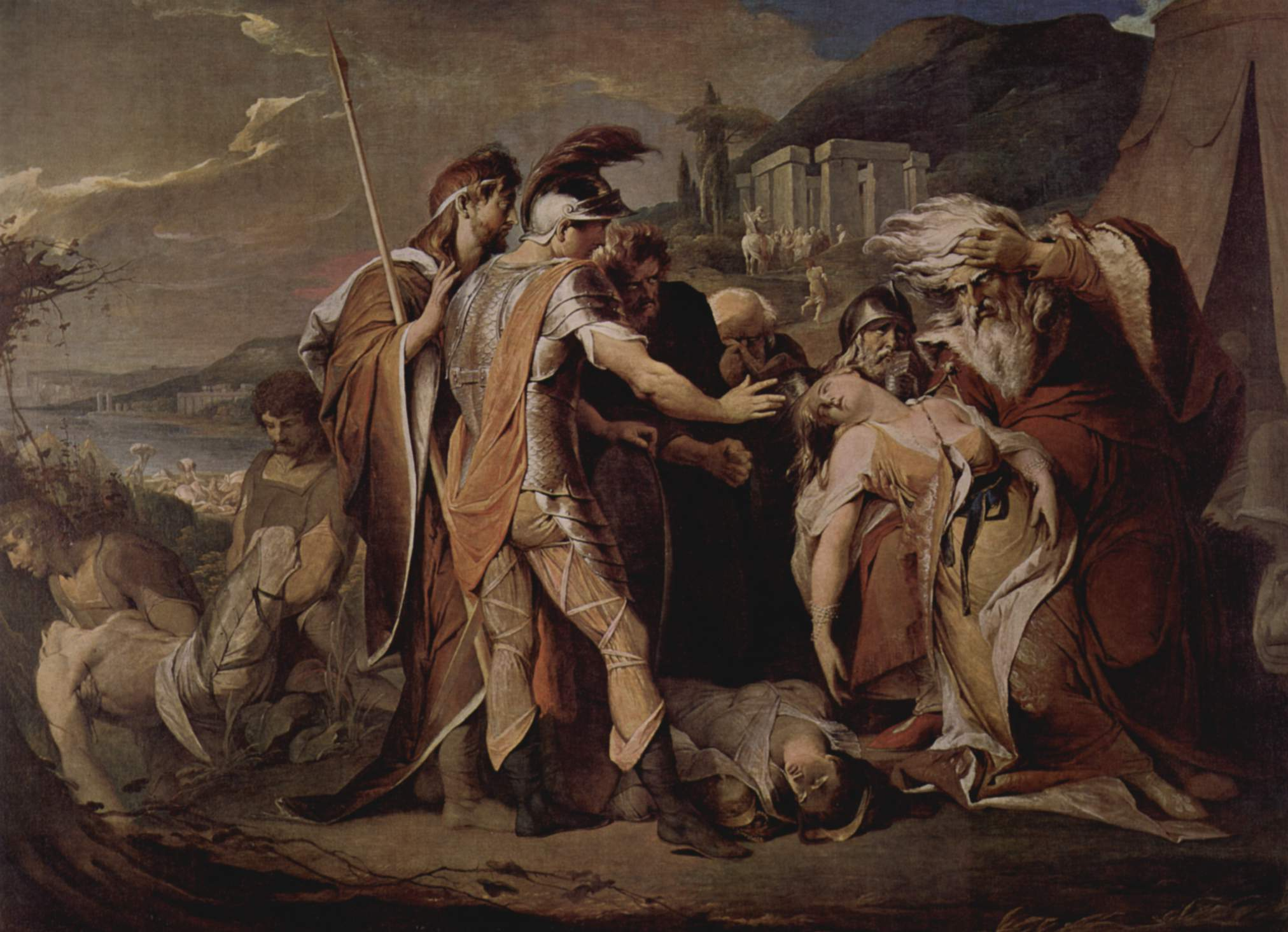
King Lear mourns Cordelia's death, James Barry, 1786–1788

Cordelia was always Lear's favourite daughter. After Lear is rejected by Cordelia's sisters, Goneril and Regan, he goes mad. Cordelia returns at the end of the play with the intention of helping Lear, ultimately reversing her role as daughter to that of mother. But when she arrives, Lear is not able to recognize her because of his state of madness. Nevertheless, she forgives him for banishing her. By the time Lear finally regains his reason and realizes who Cordelia is, they have little time to talk and reconcile, as both are soon captured after Cordelia sends a punitive expedition against her sisters. Edmund arrives and sends them both to prison, where Cordelia is ultimately hanged. In Nahum Tate's revision The History of King Lear (1681), which replaced Shakespeare's original version on stage for decades, the King of France is not mentioned, and Cordelia marries Edgar and becomes ruler of the kingdom.

== Cordelia as a mother figure ==
When Lear offers his kingdom to his three daughters, a role reversal occurs in which the daughters become mother figures for Lear. By dividing his kingdom among his daughters, Lear gives them the power to dictate his own future, just as a father has control over the future of his children. Because Cordelia is the daughter he loves most, Lear expects her to care for him as he hands over his power to his children and advances into old age, much like how a mother cares for her baby. By not doing this, Cordelia may have been trying to let her father maintain his power and not change their relationship.

== Performance on screen ==
- Florence Pugh, in King Lear (2018) Amazon Dir. Richard Eyre
- Romola Garai, in King Lear (2009) PBS Dir. Sir Trevor Nunn and Chris Hunt
- Julie Cox, as Claudia Lear in King of Texas (2002) TNT Dir. Uli Edel
- Phillipa Peak, in King Lear (1999) Dir. Brian Blessed & Tony Rotherham
- Victoria Hamilton, in Performance King Lear (1998) Dir. Richard Eyre
- Anna Calder-Marshall, in King Lear (1983, TV) Dir. Michael Elliott
- Brenda Blethyn, in King Lear (1982, TV) Dir. Jonathan Miller
- Wendy Allnutt, in King Lear (1976, TV) Dir. Tony Davenall
- Lee Chamberlin, in King Lear (1974, TV) Dir. Edwin Sherin
- Anne-Lise Gabold, in King Lear (1971, UK film) Dir. Peter Brook
- Valentina Shendrikova, in Korol Lir (1971, USSR film) Dir. Grigori Kozintsev & Iosif Shapiro
- Natasha Parry, in King Lear (1953, TV) Dir. Andrew McCullough
- Lorraine Huling, in King Lear (1916) Dir. Ernest C. Warde
