= Regan (King Lear) =

Character in Shakespeare's play

- King Lear character
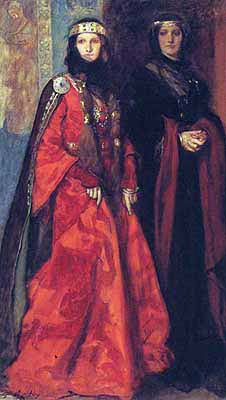
- Goneril and Regan by Edwin Austin Abbey
- Created by: William Shakespeare

In-universe information
- Family: Lear (father); Goneril (sister); Cordelia (sister)
- Spouse: Henwin, Duke of Cornwall
- Children: Cunedagius

Regan is a fictional character in William Shakespeare's tragic play King Lear, the daughter of the king named after a King of the Britons recorded by the medieval scribe Geoffrey of Monmouth.

Shakespeare based the character on Regan, a personage described by Geoffrey of Monmouth in his pseudo-historical chronicle Historia regum Britanniae ("History of the Kings of Britain", c. 1138) as one of the British king Lear's three daughters, alongside Goneril and Cordelia (the source for Cordelia), and the mother of Cunedagius.

== Role in play ==
Regan is the middle child of King Lear's daughters and is married to the Duke of Cornwall. Similarly to her older sister Goneril, Regan is attracted to Edmund. Both sisters are eager for power and convince their father with false flattery to hand over his kingdom.

"Sir, I am made
Of the self same metal that my sister is,
And prize me at her worth. In my true heart,
I find she names my very deed of love;
Only she comes too short, that I profess
Myself an enemy to all other joys,
Which the most precious square of sense possesses,
And find I am alone felicitate
In your dear highness' love."

-Regan's falsely flattering speech to King Lear, King Lear 1.1.67–74.

Later in the play, Lear leaves his kingdom to live with Goneril. She rejects him due to his refusal to give up his knights. After Lear leaves Goneril's house, he asks Regan to take him in. She tells him he has too many servants and knights, just as Goneril had. Unwilling to budge, Regan drives Lear into the storm. However, it was Lear's decision to go into the storm in a show of stubborn refusal to give up his knights.

In Act 3, Scene 7, after learning that the Earl of Gloucester has helped Lear escape to Dover, Regan, Goneril, and the Duke of Cornwall discuss what Gloucester's fate should be. While Regan suggests that they "hang him instantly," (3.7. 4), Goneril orders that his eyes be plucked out. After Goneril and Edmund leave, Regan watches as her husband plucks out Gloucester's eyes. When a servant attempts to stop the Duke of Cornwall, Regan kills him. She then leads her wounded husband offstage, where he dies.

After her husband's death, Regan attempts to woo Edmund, who is now the Earl of Gloucester. While Goneril seems romantically interested in Edmund, it is unclear whether Regan's affections are sincere. She says that Edmund is more "convenient" (4.6. 31) for her hand that for Goneril's, implying that her desire is at least partly political in nature. In the final act, Goneril poisons Regan's drink after learning that they share a desire for Edmund. Regan cries "Sick, O sick!" to which Goneril replies in an aside "If not, I'll ne'er trust medicine," (5.3. 97–98). Regan quickly becomes ill and dies offstage.

Regan, like her elder sister, is portrayed as unnecessarily cruel. After Gloucester's eyes have been plucked out, she orders to "Go, thrust him out the gates, and let him smell/his way to Dover." (3.7. 94–95). Stanley Cavell notes Regan's characteristic relish building upon and outdoing others' evils: "[S]he has no ideas of her own, her special vileness is always to increase the measure of pain that others are prepared to inflict; her mind itself is a lynch mob" (291).

== Performance on screen ==
- Emily Watson. King Lear (2018) (TV) Dir. Richard Eyre
- Monica Dolan. King Lear (2009) PBS Dir. Sir Trevor Nunn and Chris Hunt
- Claire Laurie. King Lear (1999) Dir. Brian Blessed & Tony Rotherham
- Amanda Redman. Performance King Lear (1998) Dir. Richard Eyre
- Diana Rigg. King Lear (1983) (TV) Dir. Michael Elliott
- Penelope Wilton. King Lear (1982) (TV) Dir. Jonathan Miller
- Ann Lynn. King Lear (1976) (TV) Dir. Tony Davenall
- Ellen Holly. King Lear (1974) (TV) Dir. Edwin Sherin
- Susan Engel. King Lear (1971 UK Film) Dir. Peter Brook
- Galina Volchek. Korol Lir (1971 USSR Film) Dir. Grigori Kozintsev & Iosif Shapiro
- Margaret Phillips. King Lear (1953) (TV) Dir. Andrew McCullough
