= Lear baronets =

Extinct baronetcy in the Baronetage of England

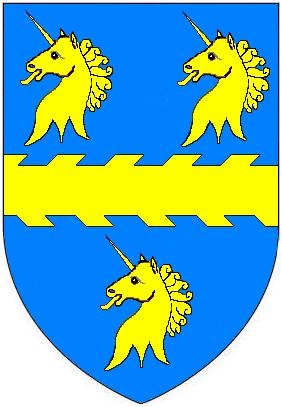
Arms of Lear: Azure, a fess raguly between three unicorn's heads erased or, as visible on the mural monument to Sir Peter Lear in Bishopsteignton Church, Devon

Two baronetcies both created for Peter Lear, West India merchant

== Lear of London ==
The Baronetcy of Lear of London was created in the Baronetage of England on 2 July 1660 for Peter Lear. The baronetcy became extinct upon his death about 1684.

=== Lear of London (1660) ===
- Sir Peter Lear, 1st Baronet (died c.1684)

Extinct on his death

== Lear of Lindridge ==
The new Baronetcy of Lear of Lindridge was created in the Baronetage of England on 2 August 1683 for Sir Peter Lear of London, Baronet, whose Devon residence was Lindridge House, Bishopsteignton, with a special remainder to his nephews, he being without issue.

His eldest nephew was Thomas Lear of Lindridge Devon, MP for Ashburton. The baronetcy became extinct upon the death of his brother the third Baronet in 1736.

=== Lear of Lindridge (1683) ===
- Sir Peter Lear, 1st Baronet (died c. 1684)
- Sir Thomas Lear, 2nd Baronet (1672–1705) MP for Ashburton 1701–05
- Sir John Lear, 3rd Baronet (died c. 1736)

Extinct on his death
