= Cordelia of Britain =

Legendary Queen of the Britons

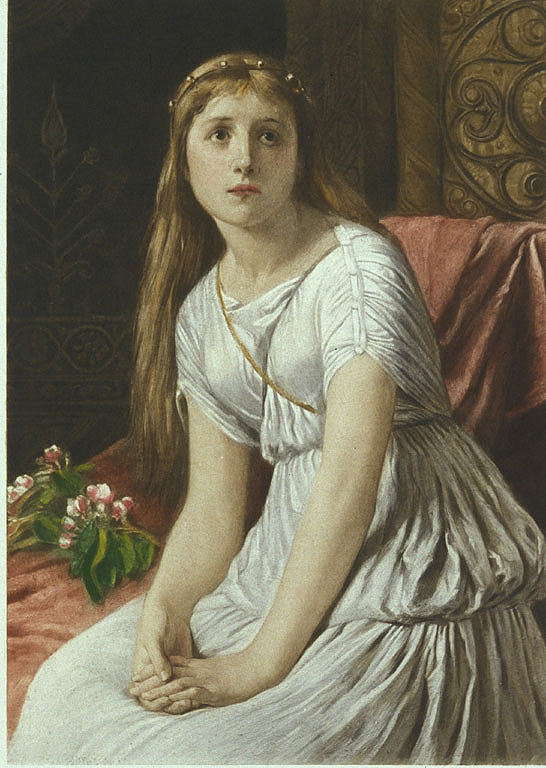
- Cordelia, by William Frederick Yeames

Queen of Britain
- Reign: fl. 855BCE
- Predecessor: Leir
- Successor: Marganus I (North Britain); Cunedagius (South Britain)
- Spouse: Aganippus
- Father: Leir

Cordelia (or Cordeilla) was a legendary Queen of the Britons, as recounted by Geoffrey of Monmouth. She came to power in 855BC.

She was the youngest daughter of Leir and the second ruling queen of pre-Roman Britain. There is no independent historical evidence for her existence. She is traditionally identified with the minor character Creiddylad from Welsh tradition, but this identification has been doubted by scholars.

== Legend ==
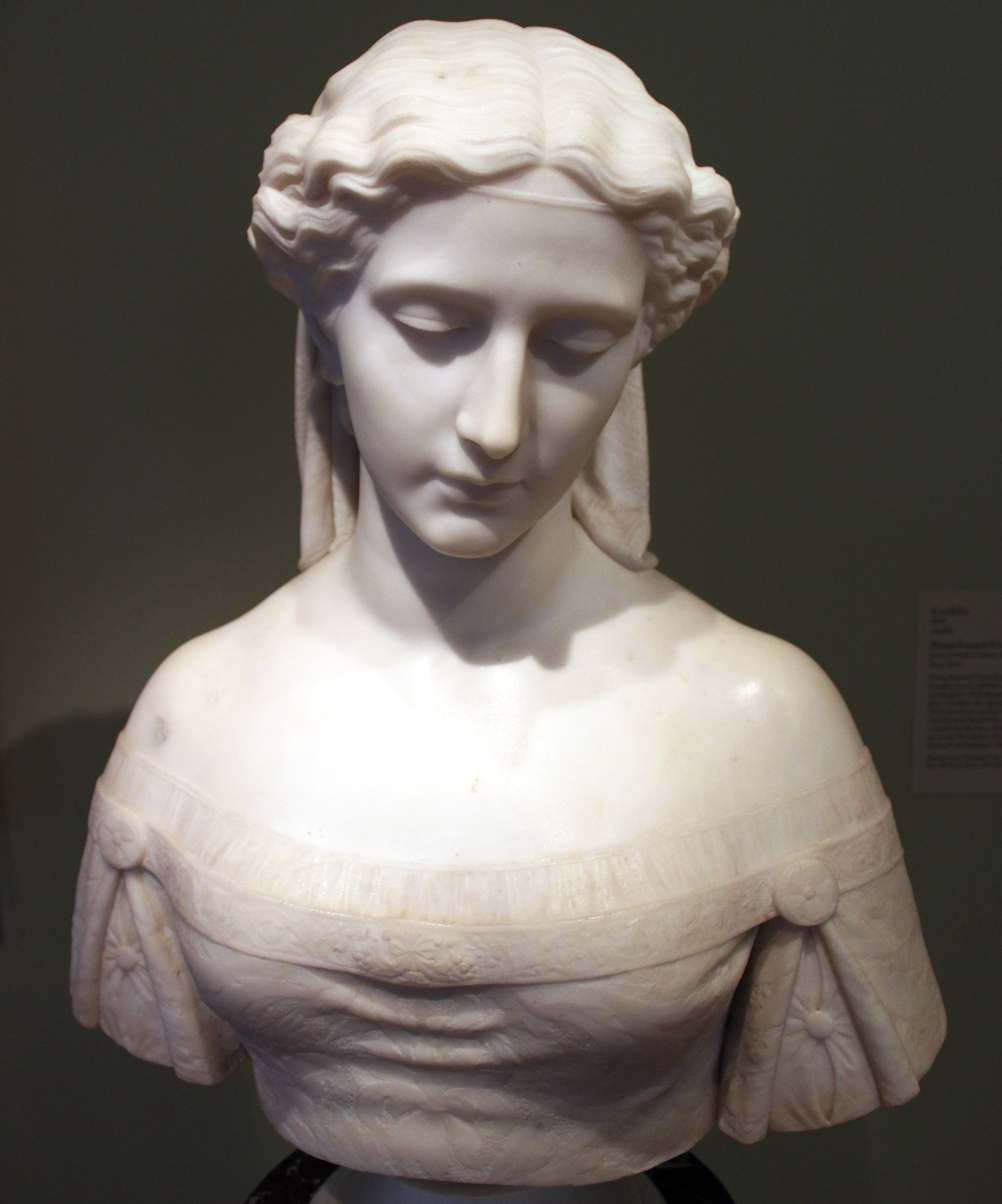
Cordelia by Pierce Francis Connelly

Cordelia was Leir's favourite daughter, being the younger sister to Goneril and Regan. When Leir decided to divide his kingdom among his daughters and their husbands, Cordelia refused to flatter him. In response, Leir refused her any land in Britain or the blessing of any husband. Regardless, Aganippus, the king of the Franks, courted her, and Leir granted the marriage but denied him any dowry. She moved to the royal court at Karitia in Gaul and lived there for many years.

Leir became exiled from Britain and fled to Cordelia in Gaul, seeking a restoration of his throne which had been seized by the husbands of his other daughters. She raised an army and invaded Britain, defeating the ruling dukes and restoring Leir. After Leir's death three years later, Cordelia's husband Aganippus died, and she returned to Britain and was crowned queen.

Cordelia ruled peacefully for five years until her sisters' sons, Cunedagius and Marganus, came of age. As the dukes of Cornwall and Albany, respectively, they despised the rule of a woman when they claimed proper descent to rule. They raised armies and fought against Cordelia, who fought in person at numerous battles. She was captured and imprisoned by her nephews. In her grief, she committed suicide. Cunedagius succeeded her in the kingship of Britain in the lands southwest of the Humber. Marganus ruled the region northeast of the Humber. Civil war broke out between them soon after, with Marganus' being defeated and killed.

== In culture ==
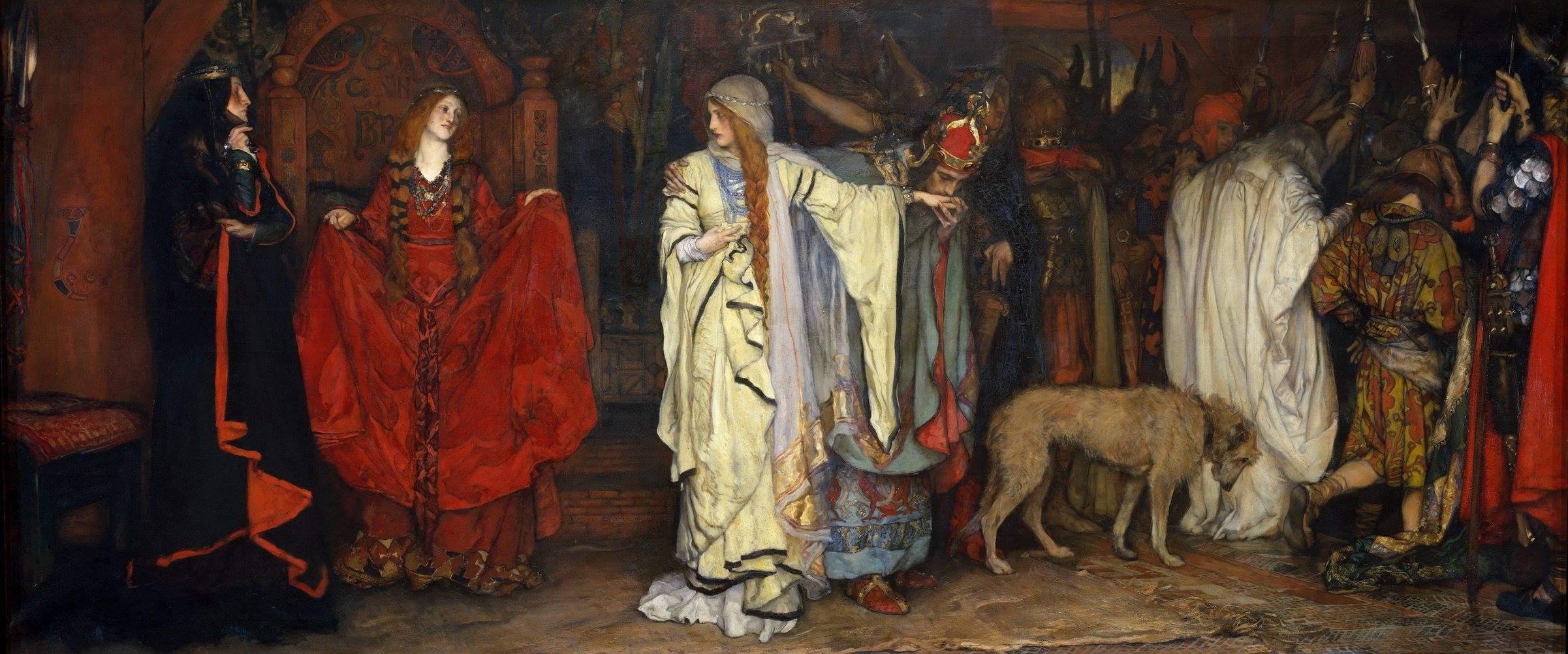
Edwin Austin Abbey (1852–1911) King Lear, Cordelia's Farewell

The story was used by William Shakespeare in his play King Lear. In Shakespeare's version, Cordelia's invasion of Britain is unsuccessful; she is captured and murdered, and her father does not retake the throne.

Before Shakespeare, the story was also used in Edmund Spenser's epic The Faerie Queene and in the anonymous play King Leir. The popularity of Cordelia at this period is probably because her role as a heroic queen was comparable to Queen Elizabeth I.

== See also ==
- List of women warriors in folklore
- Women warriors in literature and culture

Legendary titles
Preceded by Leir	Queen of Britain	Succeeded by Marganus I (North Britain); Cunedagius (South Britain)
