= Edmund (King Lear) =

Character in King Lear

- King Lear character
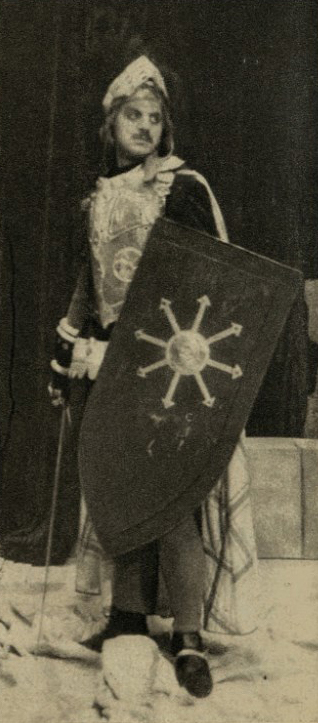
- Demeter Bitenc in costume as Edmund (Ljubljanska Drama, 1949)
- Created by: William Shakespeare

In-universe information
- Family: Earl of Gloucester (father); Edgar (half-brother)
- Nationality: English

Edmund is a fictional character and the main antagonist in William Shakespeare's King Lear. He is the illegitimate son of the Earl of Gloucester, and the younger brother of Edgar, the Earl's legitimate son. In the first act of the play, Edmund resolves to get rid of his brother, then his father, and become Earl in his own right. He later flirts with both Goneril and Regan and attempts to play them off against each other. His mother died during childbirth.

== Origins ==
Shakespeare's source for the subplot of Edmund, Edgar and Gloucester was a tale from Philip Sidney's Countess of Pembroke's Arcadia of a blind Paphlagonian king and his two sons, Leonatus and Plexirtus. The name "Edmund" itself means "wealth protector" or "protector of wealth".

Edmund and Edgar were also the names of the sons of Malcolm III of Scotland who killed Macbeth. Historically, Edmund of Scotland had betrayed his immediate family to support his uncle Donald III. Following the death of Malcolm III from being stabbed in the eye, they ordered the killing of Edmund's half-brother Duncan II, the rightful heir, to take the Scottish throne. Edgar, Edmund's younger brother, then returned to Scotland and defeated them to become King. Edmund was then sent to an English monastery where he later died. Due to these clear parallels the choice of Edmund and Edgar as names may have been a nod by Shakespeare to the continued story of the Scottish throne following the events of Macbeth.

There is also a more immediate literary forerunner in a play by an unknown author or authors, current in London around 1590: The True Chronicle history of King Lear, and his three daughters, Goneril, Regan, and Cordelia. (Note: The plot of the play The True Chronicle history of King Lear, and his three daughters, Goneril, Regan, and Cordelia (c. 1590) follows fairly closely the account given in Geoffrey of Monmouth but adds a significant character to whom no name is given, possibly because he does not figure in the original. Known only as Messenger, he does (or tries to do) much of what Shakespeare's character Edmund does: At the point the Messenger first appears, Lear has already left the household of Goneril for that of Regan, now Queen of Cambria. The Messenger allows Goneril to take from him Cornwall's letters for Lear, and replace them with her own to her sister, intended to provoke Regan to the murder of Lear. Having taken money for this service and promised, in terms full of sexual quibbles, to be Goneril's servant, he then extracts a second fee from Regan to see to Lear's murder, and a third fee for the murder of Lear's companion. He ends the scene by speculating that he believes he could make a sexual conquest of Regan as well as her sister. The part of the character which Shakespeare abandons is that the Messenger comes on Lear and his companion dozing in a garden and, in a lengthy scene of mixed pathos and comedy, loses his nerve after they wake, and abandons the enterprise altogether.)

== Analysis ==
Gloucester's younger, illegitimate son is an opportunistic, short-sighted character whose ambitions lead him to form a union with Goneril and Regan. The injustice of Edmund's situation fails to justify his subsequent actions, although at the opening of the play when Gloucester explains Edmund's illegitimacy (in his hearing) to Kent, with coarse jokes, although some can read this as obviously affection, the audience can initially feel sympathetic towards him, until his true character is revealed. Like Shylock and his "Has not a Jew eyes ... ?" (Merchant of Venice, act III, sc 1, ln 60), Edmund makes a speech, "Why bastard? Wherefore base?" (act I, sc 2, ln 5) decrying his stereotype before conforming to it. Edmund uses the circumstances of his birth as an excuse for his actions, although it is the stigma of bastardry and not illegitimacy itself which causes Edmund's evil. Arguably, an Elizabethan audience would have known that Edmund was intended to be an evil character because he was born under Ursa Major, with the evil influence of the Dragon's Tail at his conception.

Edmund rejects the laws of state and society in favour of the laws he sees as eminently more practical and useful: The supremacy of superior cunning and strength. Edmund’s desire to use any means possible to secure his own needs makes him appear initially as a villain without a conscience. But Edmund has some solid economic impetus for his actions, and he acts from a complexity of reasons, many of which are similar to those of Goneril and Regan. To rid himself of his father, Edmund feigns regret and laments that his nature, which is to honour his father, must be subordinate to the loyalty he feels for his country. Edmund thus excuses the betrayal of his own father, having willingly and easily left his father vulnerable to Cornwall's anger. Edmund later shows no hesitation, nor any concern, about killing the king or Cordelia; in the end, Edmund repents and tries to rescind his order to execute Cordelia and Lear, but it is done too late: Cordelia has already been executed by Edmund's order.

Because of primogeniture, Edmund will inherit nothing from his father. That gives Edmund motivation to betray his brother Edgar and manipulate his way into relationships with both Goneril and Regan. If Lear, Cordelia, and Kent represent the old ways of monarchy, order, and a distinct hierarchy, then Edmund is the most representative of a new order which adheres to a Machiavellian code. Edmund's determination to undo his brother and claim his father's title causes him to cut his own arm early in the play to make an imaginary fight between Edgar (his brother) and himself more convincing.

Late in the play, Edmund begins to adhere to the traditional values of society, and tries to repent for his sins, but he crucially delays in rescinding his order to execute Lear and Cordelia. There is some debate as to what motivates Edmund's change of heart. Edmund's declaring Nature as his goddess undermines the law of primogeniture and legitimacy. Another character that Edmund is often compared to is Iago of Othello, but Edmund is seen as the better character of the pair, as he tries to repent. After his betrayal of Edgar and his father, Cornwall, Regan's husband, becomes like a new father to Edmund, as he also has an opportunistic bent.

Edmund's affairs with Goneril and Regan tie the two subplots together very well, although the relationships are not presented in detail, and they do not exist in Plexirtus, the source material for Edmund. He does not appear to have as much affection for the two sisters as they do for him, and although he was effective against his father and brother, he cannot effectively play the two sisters off against each other. When he speaks to Goneril and Regan, he does not speak well, whereas in other situations he speaks very well – this is partially due to his trying to conceal from each his involvement with the other. Edmund is the sisters' lust object, rather than true love, although he himself does not realise this. His marrying the two sisters as he dies is an allusion to, and parody of courtly love, in which lovers separated by circumstance could be married in death.

== Spin offs ==
"Edmund, Son of Gloucester" by Chris Lambert was performed by Exiled theatre in 1996 and toured nationally. The play studied Edmund's back-story from birth to his appearance in King Lear to explore the reasons for his actions. The play starred Adrian Ross-Jones as Edmund and Robert Addie as Gloucester.
