= Goneril =

Character in Shakespeare's King Lear

- King Lear character
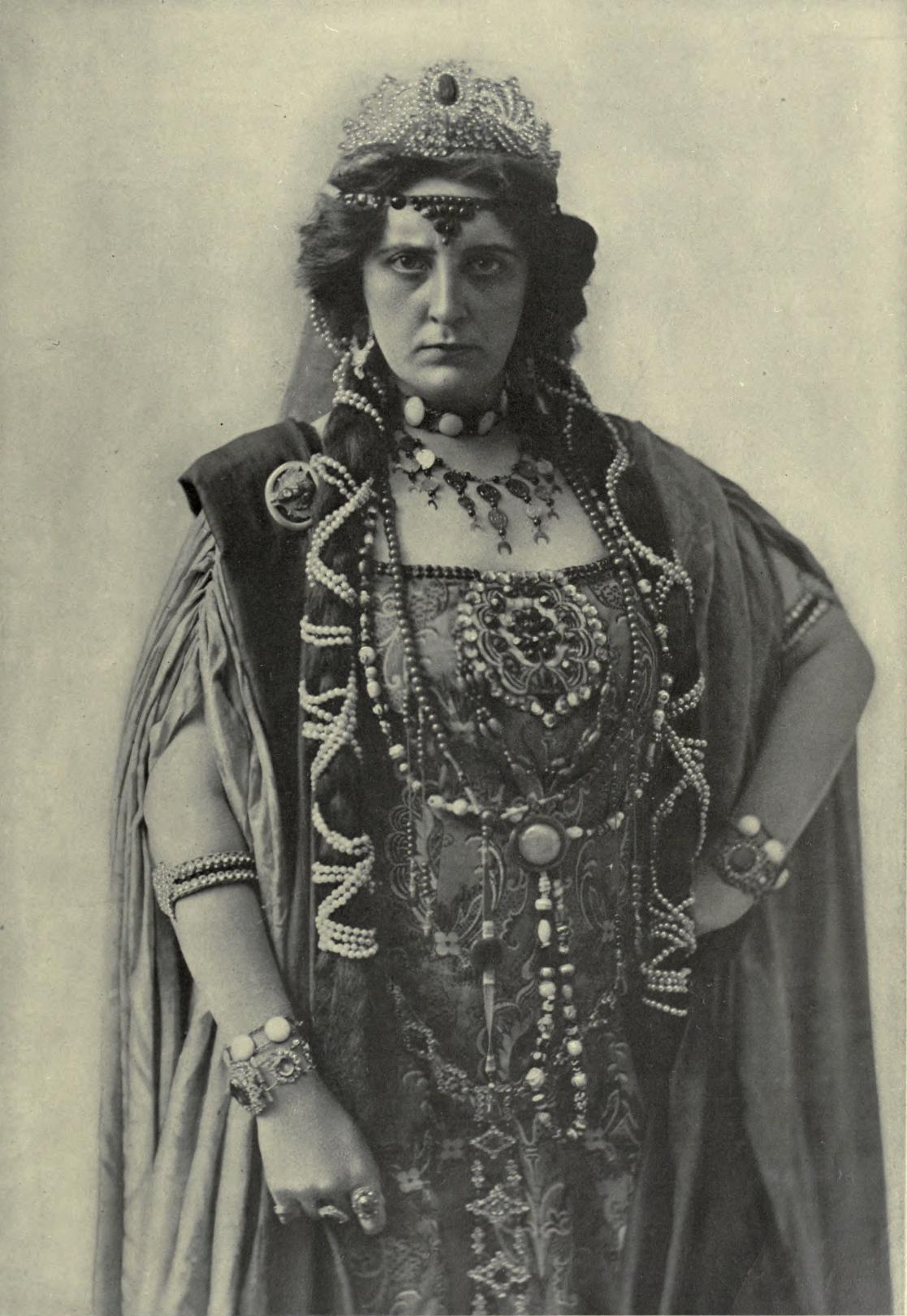
- Marie Booth Russell in costume as Goneril (1911)
- Created by: William Shakespeare

In-universe information
- Family: Lear (father); Regan (sister); Cordelia (sister)
- Spouses: Maglurus, Duke of Albany
- Children: Marganus

Goneril is a character in William Shakespeare's tragic play King Lear (1605). She is the eldest of King Lear's three daughters. Along with her sister Regan, Goneril is considered a villain, obsessed with power and overthrowing her elderly father as ruler of the kingdom of Britain.

Shakespeare based the character on Gonorilla, a personage described by Geoffrey of Monmouth in his pseudo-historical chronicle Historia regum Britanniae ("History of the Kings of Britain", c. 1138) as the eldest of the British king Lear's three daughters, alongside Regan and Cordeilla (the source for Cordelia) and the mother of Marganus.

== Role in play ==
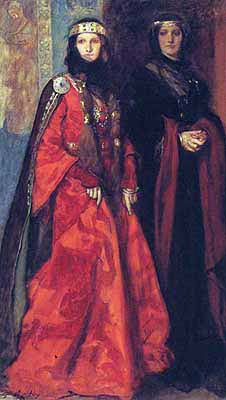
Goneril and Regan by Edwin Austin Abbey

Goneril is the oldest daughter of King Lear. She is married to the Duke of Albany. She is also one of the play's principal villains. In the first scene, her father asks each of his daughters to profess their love for him to receive their portion of the kingdom. Goneril's speech, while flattering, is not genuine as she only wishes to accrue power.

After Lear banishes his youngest daughter Cordelia for failing to flatter him as Goneril and Regan did, Lear decides that he will spend half the year in Goneril's castle and the other half in Regan's. She believes that her father is an old madman, and that "old fools are babes again" (1.3.20) and must be set straight with reprimands as well as flattery. Lear arrives at Goneril's castle with 100 knights who carry on with noisy debauchery. Goneril discusses with Oswald the unruly behavior of these knights and tells him to tell the other servants to neglect Lear so that he'll confront her about it. She also tells Oswald that she'll take responsibility for his actions. Later, she confronts her father, telling him to punish his knights for their behavior (before telling him to just get rid of the unruly ones) Lear erupts in anger, spews insults at her, and disowns her before departing for Regan's castle.

During Act 2, Goneril meets Regan and Lear at the Earl of Gloucester's house, where she supports her sister against her father, causing Lear to fly into a rage and rush into a thunderstorm. Goneril and Regan then order that the doors be shut on Lear.

In Act 3, after learning that Gloucester has helped Lear escape to Dover to have a rendezvous with an invading French army, Regan suggests that Cornwall pluck out Gloucester's eyes. Goneril takes a romantic interest in Edmund, seeing him as more manly than her cowardly husband Albany. Albany is repulsed by Goneril's actions and denounces her, but she questions his manhood.

In the play's final act, as the British forces battle with the French army (led by Cordelia), Goneril discovers that Regan is pursuing Edmund, so she poisons her (offstage) to ensure Regan does not marry him. After Regan dies, Goneril kills herself. There is little explanation for her suicide, as it seems uncharacteristic of the self-serving woman presented throughout the play, but it is implied that the cause of her suicide is a mixture of the thwarting of her plans and her confession to poisoning Regan.

== Analysis ==
Goneril is cruel and deceitful. The earliest example of her deceitfulness occurs in the first act. Without a male heir, Lear is prepared to divide his kingdom among his three daughters as long as they express their true love to him. Knowing her response will get her closer to the throne, Goneril professes, "Sir, I love you more than words can wield the matter" (1.1. 53). She has no reservations about lying to her father.

She finally begins to let go of the persona of an obedient and loving daughter when Lear goes to stay with her and her husband. She tells him to send away his knights and servants because there are too many of them and they are too loud. Livid that he is being disrespected, Lear curses her and leaves.

Goneril, the wife of the Duke of Albany (an archaic name for Scotland), has an intimate relationship with Edmund, one that may have been played up in the earlier editions of King Lear. She writes a note encouraging Edmund to kill her husband and marry her, but it is discovered. In the final act, Goneril discovers that Regan desires Edmund as well and poisons her sister's drink, killing her. However, once Edmund is mortally wounded, Goneril goes offstage and kills herself.

While the reasons for Goneril's hatred of her father never are explained explicitly in the text, Stephen Reid hypothesizes that Goneril, as the eldest daughter, hates her father because he favors Cordelia over her. In Reid's eyes, "Lear's actual rejection of a daughter, Cordelia, awakened in both Goneril and Regan dim memories of their past and long repressed bitterness at his rejection of them, a bitterness they had never been able to express or come to terms with."

== Performance history ==
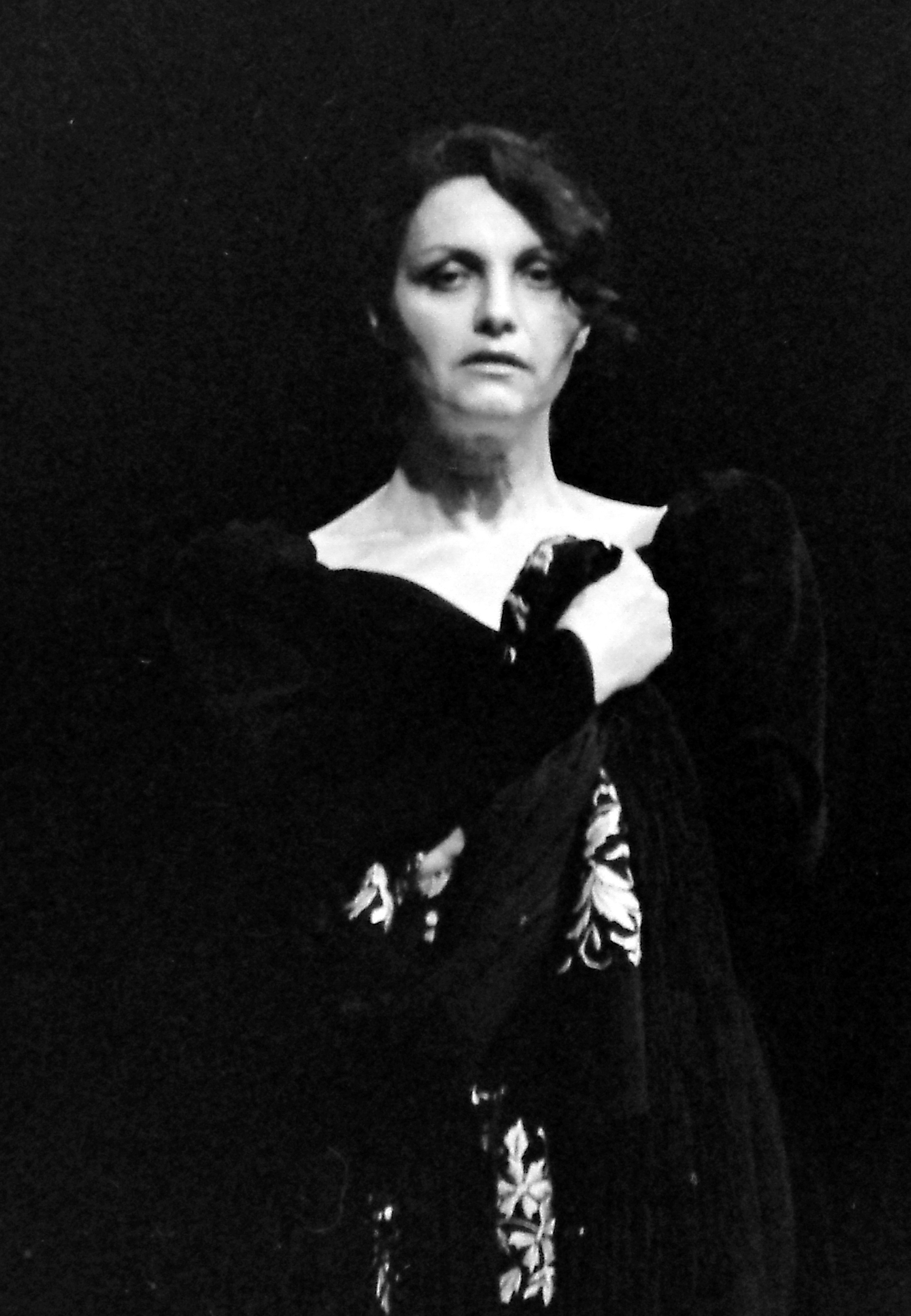
Jana Březinová playing Goneril in 1991

=== Onscreen ===
- Beatrice Straight. King Lear (1953, TV), directed by Andrew McCullough
- Elza Radzina. Korol Lir (1971, USSR Film), directed by Grigori Kozintsev & Iosif Shapiro
- Irene Worth. King Lear (1971, UK Film), directed by Peter Brook
- Rosalind Cash. King Lear (1974, TV), directed by Edwin Sherin
- Beth Harris. King Lear (1976, TV), directed by Tony Davenall
- Gillian Barge. King Lear (1982, TV), directed by Jonathan Miller
- Dorothy Tutin. King Lear (1983, TV), directed by Keith Elliott
- Barbara Flynn. Performance King Lear (1998), directed by Richard Eyre
- Caroline Lennon. King Lear (1999), directed by Brian Blessed & Tony Rotherham
- Frances Barber. King Lear (2009, PBS), directed by Sir Trevor Nunn and Chris Hunt
- Kate Fleetwood. King Lear (2014, National Theatre Live) directed by Sam Mendes
- Emma Thompson. King Lear (2018, TV), directed by Richard Eyre
