= Leir of Britain =

Pseudo-historical king

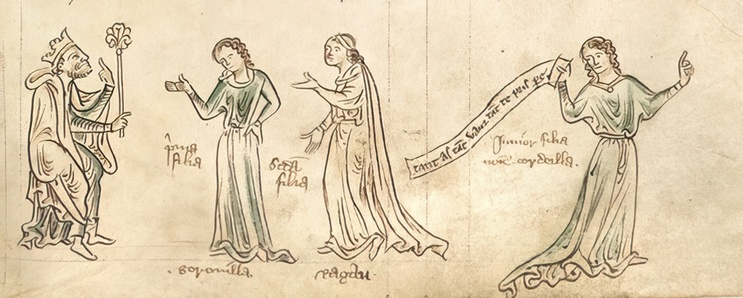
- King Leir and his daughters, a marginal illustration in the Chronica Majora, c. 1250

King of Britain
- Reign: 8th century BC
- Predecessor: Bladud
- Successor: Cordelia
- Issue: Goneril; Regan; Cordelia
- Father: Bladud

Leir was a legendary king of the Britons whose story was recounted by Geoffrey of Monmouth in his pseudohistorical 12th-century History of the Kings of Britain. According to Geoffrey's genealogy of the British dynasty, Leir reigned around the 8th century BC, around the time of the founding of Rome. The story was modified and retold by William Shakespeare in his Jacobean tragedy King Lear.

== Name ==
Geoffrey of Monmouth identified Leir as the eponymous founder of the city of Leicester (Ligoraceastre in Old English; Old Welsh: Cair Lerion, Welsh: Caerlŷr), which he called (using the Old Welsh form of the city's name) Kaerleir ("City of Leir"). Leir, Lerion, and Ligora(ceastre) all derive from the old Brittonic name of the River Soar, *Ligera or *Ligora.

== Legend ==
=== Reign ===
Leir's story was first recorded in Geoffrey of Monmouth's History of the Kings of Britain. In it, Leir is part of the dynasty of Brutus of Britain and succeeded to the throne after his father Bladud died while attempting to fly with artificial wings. The dating is inexact, but Geoffrey made Bladud a contemporary of the biblical prophet Elijah. Leir was given the longest reign of Geoffrey's kings, ruling for 60 years. Geoffrey claimed he was the eponymous founder of Leicester in England.

=== Abdication ===
Leir was said to have been the end of Brutus of Troy's male line of descent, siring three daughters: Goneril, Regan, and Cordelia. As he neared his death, he divided his kingdom among them. Goneril and Regan flattered their father and, at the advice of Leir's nobles, were married off to the Dukes of Albany and Cornwall, respectively. Cordelia, despite being her father's favourite, refused to flatter him, feeling that she should not need to make special assurances of her love, and was given no land to rule. King Aganippus of the Franks courted and married Cordelia, despite Leir's refusal to pay a dowry. Leir then gave Goneril and Regan half his kingdom, planning to bequeath them the remainder at his death; instead, his sons-in-law rebelled and seized the whole of it. Duke Maglaurus of Albany, Goneril's husband, maintained Leir with a retinue of 60 knights, but his wife reduced this by half after two years. Leir then fled to Regan, who reduced his entourage to only five men. Returning to Albany and pleading with Goneril, Leir was left with a single knight for protection.

=== Restoration ===
At this point, Leir feared both his elder daughters and fled to France. He sent Cordelia a messenger when he was outside her court at Karitia. She had him bathed, royally clothed, and assigned a fittingly large band of retainers. He was then officially received by the king and made regent of France, with the Frankish nobles vowing to restore him to his former glory. Leir, Cordelia, and her husband invaded Britain and overthrew his other daughters and sons-in-law. Leir ruled three years and then died. Cordelia succeeded him and buried him in an underground shrine to the god Janus beneath the River Soar near Leicester—allegedly the current site of the city's Jewry Wall. An annual feast was held nearby in his honour.

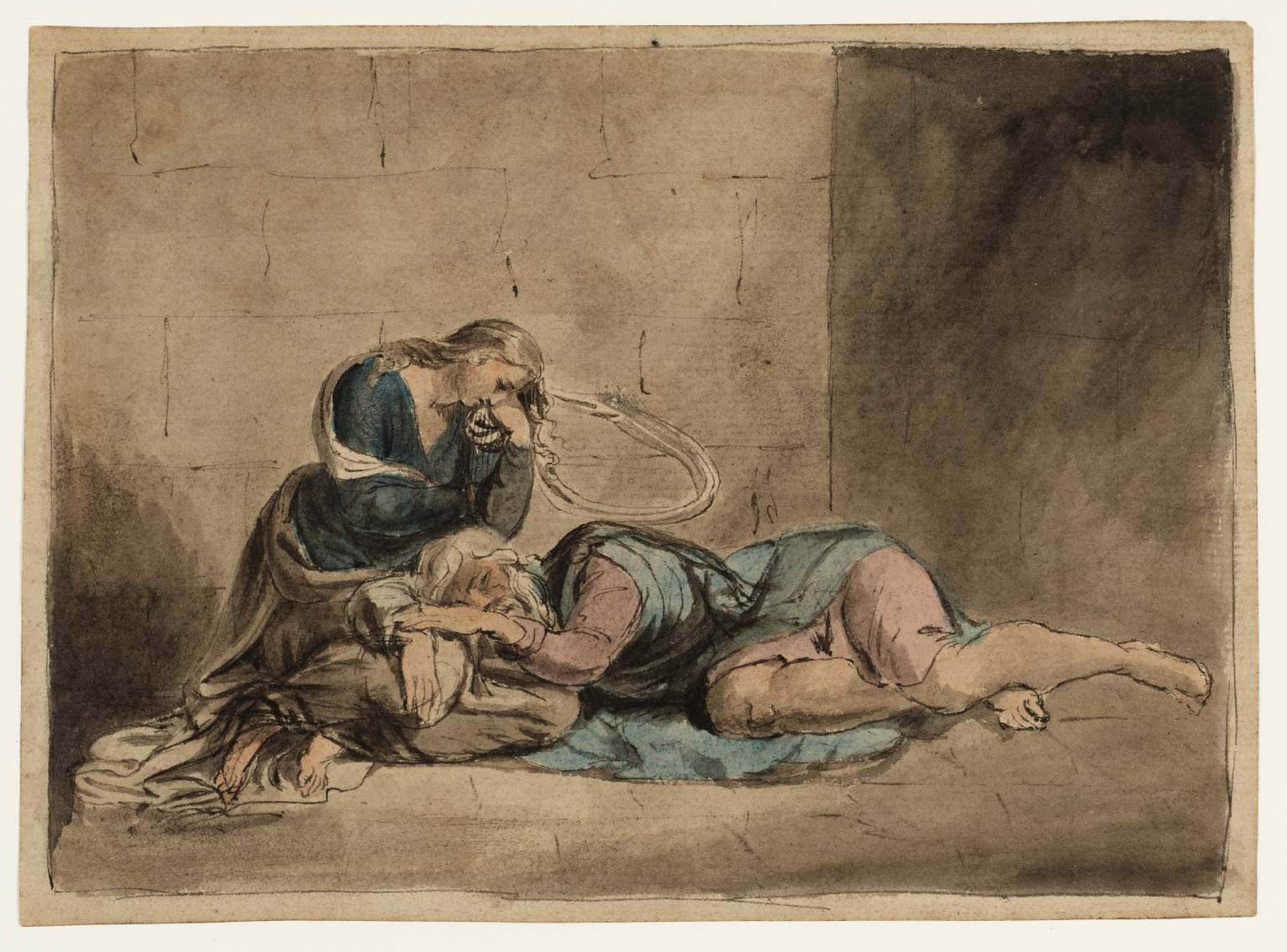
Lear and Cordelia in Prison by William Blake, c. 1779

== In culture ==
Leir's life was dramatised on the Elizabethan stage in an anonymous play, King Leir, which was registered in 1594 and published in 1605 under the title The True Chronicle History of King Leir, and his three daughters, Gonorill, Ragan, and Cordella. This precursor to William Shakespeare's tragedy was a comedy, repeating Geoffrey's story and ending happily with Leir's restoration to power. The story also appears in John Higgins's Mirror for Magistrates, Edmund Spenser's The Faerie Queene, and other works.

Legendary titles
Preceded by Bladud	King of Britain	Succeeded by Cordelia
