= List of compositions by Giuseppe Verdi =

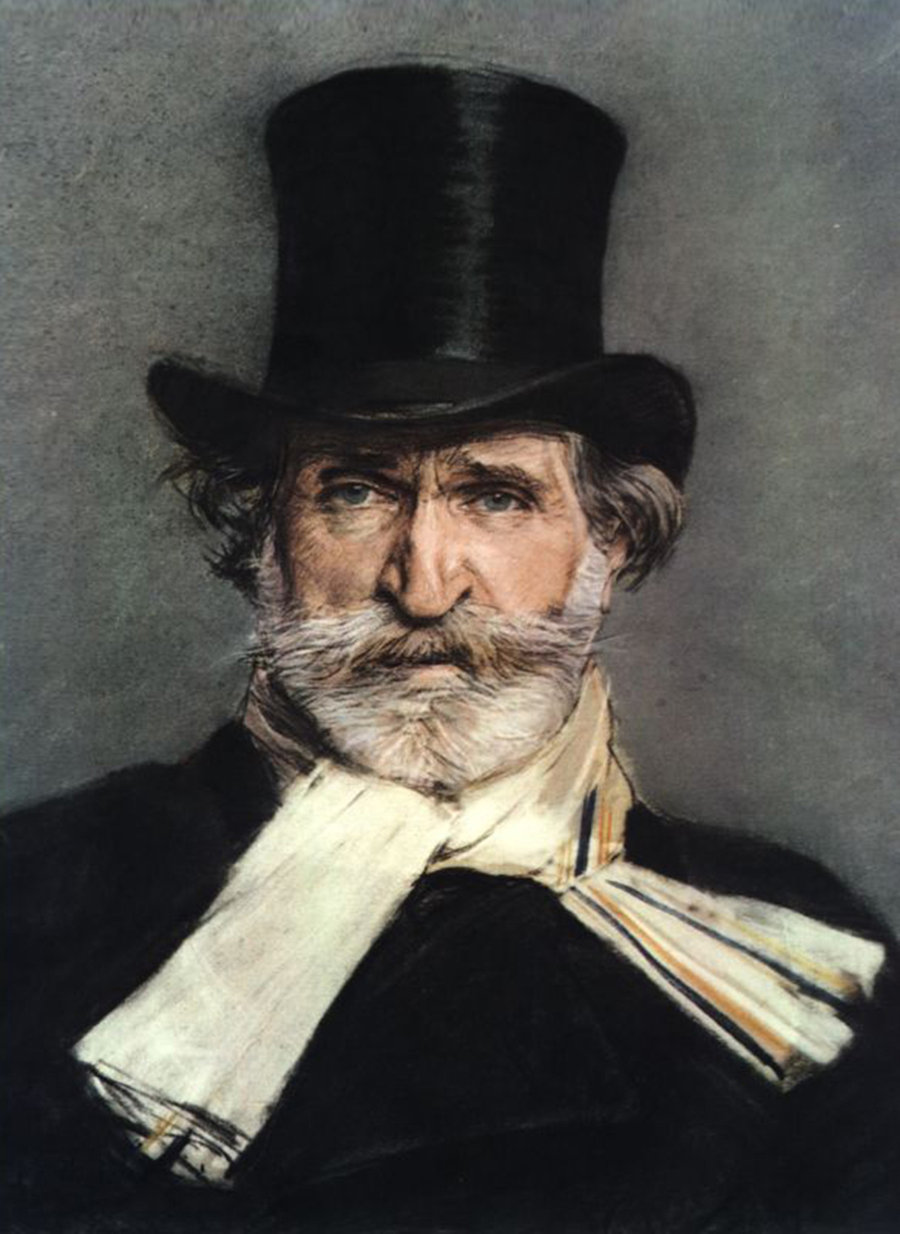
Giuseppe Verdi

The following is a list of compositions by Giuseppe Verdi (1813–1901).

The list includes original creations as well as reworkings of the operas (some of which are translations, for example into French or from French into Italian) or subsequent versions of completed operas.

== List of operas and revisions ==
Revision of earlier opera, including translations with material musical changes.

#	Title	Libretto	Acts	Language	Premiere	Remarks
1	Oberto, conte di San Bonifacio	Antonio Piazza; Temistocle Solera	2	Italian	La Scala, Milan; 17 Nov 1839	Lightly revised three times after the première
2	Un giorno di regno	Felice Romani	2	Italian	La Scala, Milan; 5 Sep 1840	Later revision known as Il finto Stanislao
3	Nabucodonosor	Temistocle Solera	4	Italian	La Scala, Milan; 9 Mar 1842	Later known as Nabucco
4	I Lombardi alla prima crociata	Temistocle Solera	4	Italian	La Scala, Milan; 11 Feb 1843	Later revised in French as Jérusalem
5	Ernani	Francesco Maria Piave	4	Italian	La Fenice, Venice; 9 Mar 1844	Based on work by Victor Hugo
6	I due Foscari	Francesco Maria Piave	3	Italian	Teatro Argentina, Rome; 3 Nov 1844	Based on work by Lord Byron
7	Giovanna d'Arco	Temistocle Solera	3	Italian	La Scala, Milan; 15 Feb 1845	Based on work by Friedrich Schiller
8	Alzira	Salvatore Cammarano	2	Italian	San Carlo, Naples; 12 Aug 1845	
9	Attila	Temistocle Solera; Francesco Maria Piave	3	Italian	La Fenice, Venice; 17 Mar 1846	Acts 1 and 2 written, and Act 3 sketched, by Solera; Act 3 completed by Piave.
10	Macbeth	Francesco Maria Piave	4	Italian	La Pergola, Florence; 14 Mar 1847	Based on work by William Shakespeare
11	I masnadieri	Andrea Maffei	4	Italian	Her Majesty's Theatre, London; 22 Jul 1847	Based on work by Friedrich Schiller
4a	Jérusalem	Temistocle Solera; Alphonse Royer; Gustave Vaëz	4	French	Salle Le Peletier, Paris; 26 Nov 1847	Revision and translation of I Lombardi alla prima crociata
12	Il corsaro	Francesco Maria Piave	3	Italian	Teatro Grande, Trieste; 25 Oct 1848	Based on work by Lord Byron
13	La battaglia di Legnano	Salvatore Cammarano	4	Italian	Teatro Argentina, Rome; 27 Jan 1849	
14	Luisa Miller	Salvatore Cammarano	3	Italian	San Carlo, Naples; 8 Dec 1849	Based on work by Friedrich Schiller
15	Stiffelio	Francesco Maria Piave	3	Italian	Teatro Grande, Trieste; 16 Nov 1850	Later revised as Aroldo
16	Rigoletto	Francesco Maria Piave	3	Italian	La Fenice, Venice; 11 Mar 1851	Based on work by Victor Hugo
17	Il trovatore	Salvatore Cammarano; Leone Emanuele Bardare	4	Italian	Teatro Apollo, Rome; 19 Jan 1853	Cammarano died before completion; his libretto was restructured by Bardare
18	La traviata	Francesco Maria Piave	3	Italian	La Fenice, Venice; 6 Mar 1853	Based on work by Alexandre Dumas fils
19	Les vêpres siciliennes	Charles Duveyrier; Eugène Scribe	5	French	Salle Le Peletier, Paris; 13 June 1855	
19a	Giovanna de Guzman	Charles Duveyrier; Eugène Scribe; Ettore Caimi	5	Italian	Teatro Regio, Parma; 26 Dec 1855	Revision and translation of Les vêpres siciliennes Also known as Batilda di Turenne in an 1858 Naples production After 1861 most commonly known as I vespri siciliani
17a	Le trouvère	Salvatore Cammarano; Leone Emanuele Bardare	4	French	La Monnaie, Brussels; 20 May 1856	Revision and translation of Il trovatore, with added ballet
20	Simon Boccanegra	Francesco Maria Piave	3	Italian	La Fenice, Venice; 12 Mar 1857	
15a	Aroldo	Francesco Maria Piave	4	Italian	Teatro Nuovo Communale, Rimini; 16 Aug 1857	Revision of Stiffelio set in Anglo-Saxon Britain; Act 3 expanded
21	Un ballo in maschera	Antonio Somma	3	Italian	Teatro Apollo, Rome; 17 Feb 1859	Revision of the unperformed Gustavo III
22	La forza del destino	Francesco Maria Piave	4	Italian	Bolshoi, Saint Petersburg; 10 Nov 1862	
10a	Macbeth	Francesco Maria Piave	4	Italian	Théâtre Lyrique, Paris; 21 Apr 1865	Revised version with cuts including Macbeth's final aria
23	Don Carlos	Joseph Méry; Camille du Locle	5	French	Salle Le Peletier, Paris; 11 Mar 1867	Based on work by Friedrich Schiller
23a	Don Carlo	Joseph Méry; Camille du Locle; Achille de Lauzières	5	Italian	Royal Italian Opera House, London; 4 Jun 1867	Translation of Don Carlos, first performed with unauthorised amendments and cuts Italian première of this version took place on 4 Jun 1867 at the Teatro Comunale, Bologna.
22a	La forza del destino	Francesco Maria Piave; Antonio Ghislanzoni	4	Italian	La Scala, Milan; 27 Feb 1869	Revised version, with text added by Ghislanzoni
24	Aida	Antonio Ghislanzoni	4	Italian	Khedivia, Cairo; 24 Dec 1871	
23b	Don Carlo	Joseph Méry; Camille du Locle; Achille de Lauzières; Antonio Ghislanzoni	5	Italian	San Carlo, Naples; Nov / Dec 1872	Revised version, with text added by Ghislanzoni
20a	Simon Boccanegra	Francesco Maria Piave; Arrigo Boito	3	Italian	La Scala, Milan; 24 Mar 1881	Revised version, with text changed and added by Boito; Act 1 Council Chamber finale added in this version
23c	Don Carlo	Joseph Méry; Camille du Locle; Charles-Louis-Étienne Nuitter; Achille de Lauzières; Angelo Zanardini	4	Italian	La Scala, Milan; 10 Jan 1884	Second revised version, omitting Act 1 and the ballet Initial revisions in French (from Don Carlos) by du Locle and Nuittier (working with Verdi); First performed in an Italian translation by Zanardini (incorporating previous work of de Lauzières)
23d	Don Carlo	Joseph Méry; Camille du Locle; Charles-Louis-Étienne Nuitter; Achille de Lauzières; Angelo Zanardini	5	Italian	Teatro Municipale, Modena; 29 Dec 1886	Third revised version, restoring Act 1
25	Otello	Arrigo Boito	4	Italian	La Scala, Milan; 5 Feb 1887	Based on work by William Shakespeare
26	Falstaff	Arrigo Boito	3	Italian	La Scala, Milan; 9 Feb 1893	Based on work by William Shakespeare

== Incomplete projects ==
- Re Lear (King Lear), 1856. Librettist Antonio Somma worked with Verdi on completing a libretto for an opera based on Shakespeare's King Lear. This libretto was based on an incomplete one written by librettist Salvatore Cammarano before he died in 1852. It was never set to music.

== Songs ==
- Sei Romanze (1838)
1. Non t'accostar all'urna (Jacopo Vittorelli)
2. More, Elisa, lo stanco poeta (Tommaso Bianchi)
3. In solitaria stanza (Jacopo Vittorelli)
4. Nell'orror di notte oscura (Carlo Angiolini)
5. Perduta ho la pace (trans. by Luigi Balestra from Goethe's Faust)
6. Deh, pietoso, o addolorata (trans. by Luigi Balestra from Goethe's Faust)
- L'esule (1839) (Temistocle Solera)
- La seduzione (1839) (Luigi Balestra)
- Guarda che bianca luna: notturno (1839) (Jacopo Vittorelli) for soprano, tenor, bass and flute obbligato
- Album di Sei Romanze (1845)
1. Il tramonto (Andrea Maffei)
2. La zingara (S. Manfredo Maggioni)
3. Ad una stella (Maffei)
4. Lo Spazzacamino (Felice Romani)
5. Il Mistero (Felice Romani)
6. Brindisi (Maffei)
- Il poveretto (1847) (Maggioni)
- L'Abandonée (1849) (Escudier)
- Stornello (1869) (anon.)
- Pietà Signor (1894) (Verdi and Boito)

== Sacred works ==
- Libera me for Messa per Rossini (1869; premiered posthumously 11 September 1988, Stuttgart). Mass in memory of Gioachino Rossini. Verdi wrote the "Libera me", with contributions from twelve other composers.
- Pater Noster (1873): for 5-part chorus
- Messa da Requiem (22 May 1874, San Marco, Milan): mass in memory of Alessandro Manzoni, for four solo voices, chorus, and orchestra; version with revised "Liber scriptus", London, May, 1875.
- Ave Maria (1880): for soprano and strings
- Quattro pezzi sacri (7 April 1898, Grande Opéra, Paris):
1. Ave Maria (1889): for mixed solo voices
2. Stabat Mater (1897): for mixed chorus and orchestra
3. Laudi alla Vergine Maria (1888): for female voices
4. Te Deum (1896): for double chorus and orchestra

== Other sacred works ==
- Tantum ergo in G major (1836)
- Tantum ergo in F major
- Messa in E♭ major
- Laudate pueri in D major
- Qui tollis in F major

== Other vocal works (secular) ==
- Suona la tromba (1848) (Goffredo Mameli), a patriotic hymn
- Inno delle nazioni (1862, London) (Arrigo Boito), cantata for tenor, chorus and orchestra. (See Hymn (or Anthem) of the Nations)

== Instrumental, orchestral, chamber works ==
Piano

- Romanza senza parole (written 1844, published 1865)
- Waltz in F Major (written 1859)
- Valzer (written by Verdi for piano, but not published until 1963 when Nino Rota adapted it for orchestra in his score for Luchino Visconti's film The Leopard)

Orchestral

- Sinfonia in B♭ major
- Sinfonia in C major
- Sinfonia del M. Verdi in D major
- with Giacomo Mori, Canto di Virginia Con Variazioni per Oboe Composte con accomp.to d'Orchestra quintetto
- Aida Sinfonia, 1872

Chamber

- String Quartet in E minor (1873)
- Stramberia for violin and piano
