= Ulrica Arfvidsson =

Swedish fortune-teller (1734–1801)

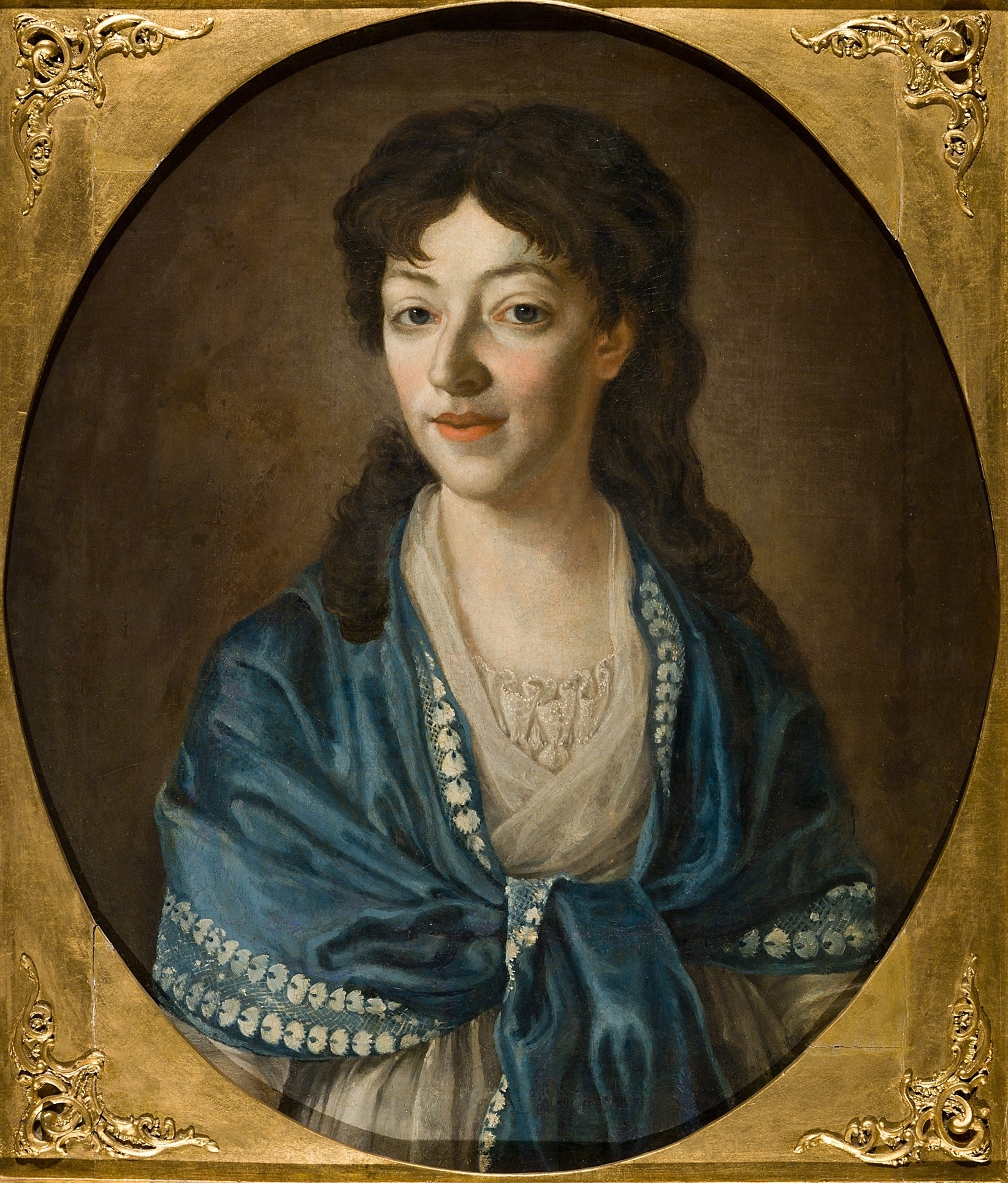
- Born: 1734; Sweden
- Died: 1801 (aged 66–67); Sweden
- Other names: Anna Ulrica Arfvidsson, Mamsell Arfvidsson, Madam Arfvidsson
- Occupation(s): Medium, fortuneteller

Notes
- Inspired the character in Daniel Auber's opera Gustave III and Giuseppe Verdi's Un ballo in maschera

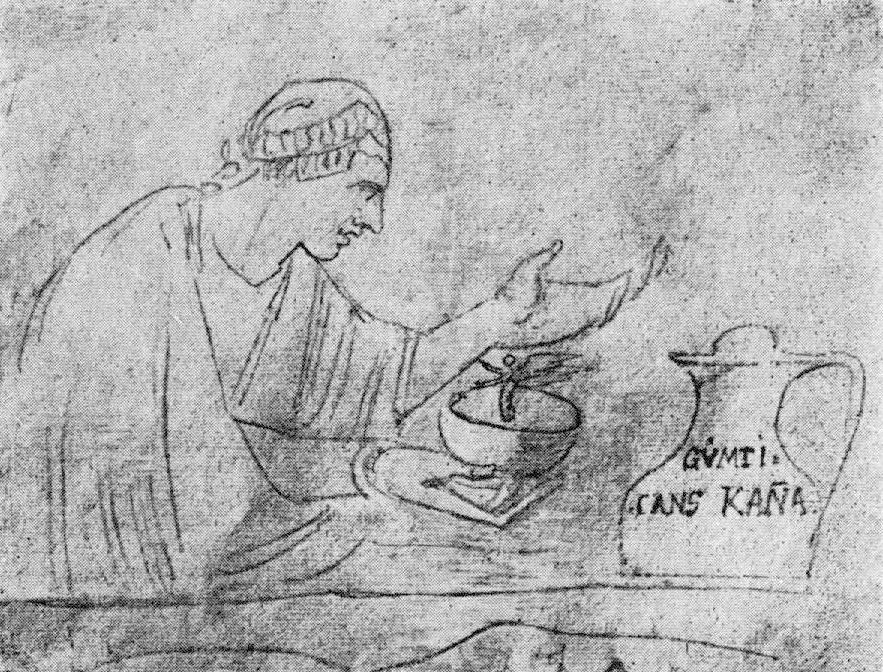
Ulrica Arfvidsson

Anna Ulrica Arfvidsson (1734–1801) was a professional Swedish fortune-teller during the reign of Gustav III of Sweden. She was commonly known as Mamsell Arfvidsson.

== Biography ==
=== Background ===
Ulrica Arfvidsson was the daughter of a caretaker of the royal palace, Erik Lindberg, and Anna Katarina Burgin (d. 1771). After the death of her father, her mother remarried in 1740 to a chef of the royal household, Arfvid Arfvidsson (d. 1767), and Ulrica took the name of her stepfather.

Ulrica Arfvidsson grew up comfortably in an environment where she heard many rumours and gossip of the higher circles in society. She became well-informed about things which many people outside of the court would like to know. Ulrica is described as an intelligent, with a sharp talent, well-developed intuition, and always very up-to-date about everything in society. Judging from the school-books from the inventory of her childhood-home, she seem to have been given a good education. She had no siblings.

Not much is known of her earlier life. It seems she had run away from home at one point, since she was sought via a newspaper advertisement. She never married. After the death of her widowed mother in 1771, she received an inheritance which made her moderately wealthy.

=== Professional fortune teller ===
The Gustavian age was a great age for fortune tellers and mediums: though occultism was formally a crime at this point, the law was in practice seldom enforced. It is not known from which point she was professionally active, though it is believed to have been from 1774 onward. In 1780, she is confirmed as a professional fortune-teller, and her clientele came from all walks of society.

Arfvidsson had her business at Lästmakargatan not far from Johannis Church in Stockholm, hidden away in an alley where mainly poor people, such as "blind and crippled women" lived, in order for her customers to come to her discreetly.

Speculation about her background pointed her out both as an eloped noblewoman and as a Finnish woman.

Her office was reportedly not much different from that of an ordinary room, however it had a corner covered by a drape, behind which she used to retire during the seances. Her clients were banned from entering it, as there was a rumor that she hid some sort of magic device behind the drape. Though she offered several different methods of fortune telling, such as card readings, her primary method was the reading of coffee grounds, thereby earning the nickname Kaffepytissan (The Coffee Seeress). During this time, several female professional fortune tellers supported themselves by this method, and they were commonly referred to as "coffee goddesses", but Arfvidsson became the most successful of her trade.

She had two assistants. One was the former domestic of her childhood home, Maja Persdotter. The other has been called Adrophia, Adotia and Adrecka Dordi (d. 1800), who was of African origin and described as a Turkish woman from Morocco, which was seen as exotic. Nothing is known of her origin other than that she had arrived to Sweden from Germany, and that she had originally been a slave.

Arfvidsson enjoyed great popularity within the aristocracy. It was said that she was never wrong, and that her predictions became more and more accurate every year. Reportedly, Ulrica Arfvidsson had a wide net of informers from all over society, reaching from the royal household to private homes. She was said to have been an informer of the police, and members of the royal house asked her for political advice, such as the future King Charles XIII of Sweden. She was consulted by Gustav III, duke Charles and other influential people during the Russo-Swedish War (1788–1790). She was also protected by Gustav III. In 1790, the chief of police Henrik Liljensparre cautioned her to discontinue her fortune telling, Liljensparre was ordered by the monarch to allow Arfvidsson to continue her trade.

During her last years, her business seems to have become less lucrative. The reason for this is suggested to have been connected to the coffee ban, which was applied twice during these years, in 1794–96 and again in 1799–1802, something which would have affected her activity significantly, as it was the reading of coffee grounds which was the preferred method of fortune telling for her and her clients. She died in poverty.

Ulrica Arfvidsson is perhaps the most famous fortune-teller in Swedish history. She is mentioned in many contemporary memoirs and diary notes. During the 19th-century, several professional fortune tellers used her fame by claiming to have been her students in the occult. Another famed occultist was Elin Håkansson, who had the ear of both Charles XI of Sweden and Charles XII of Sweden.

=== Predictions ===
In 1783, she received a visit from Carl August Ehrensvärd and the General-Admiral af Trolle in disguise. She looked into the coffee, revealed their identities, and stated that Ehrensvärd would replace af Trolle in his position. This was not likely at the time, as Ehrensvärd was not designated as the replacement of af Trolle. In 1784, however, af Trolle died during the King's visit to Italy, and it was found that the King had left an instruction that Ehrensvärd should be his replacement in the event of af Trolle's death.

In 1786, Ulrica Arfvidsson was consulted by King Gustav III of Sweden in disguise, who came to her in the company of Count Jacob De la Gardie posing as someone else. Arfvidsson presented several predictions about his past and his future, as well as that of his escort. At this occasion, she warned him about a man in a mask with a sword. This was remembered when in 1792, the King was assassinated at a masque ball by Jacob Johan Anckarström who shot the King from behind. She also warned the King: Beware of the man with a sword you will meet this evening, for he aspires to take your life.

When the King and the Count left her, they saw no one suspicious on their way back to the palace. The Count told the King to ignore her warning, but he answered: But she has told me so many other things, that have already come true! When they entered the palace and were proceeding up the stairs, they met a man with a sword leaving the apartment of the King's sister-in-law the duchess of Södermanland, consort of Prince Charles, who was suspected of conspiring against him. The man was Adolph Ludvig Ribbing, one of the future participants in the conspiracy which planned the regicide of the King in 1792. During the Russo-Swedish war of 1788–1790, the King consulted Arfvidsson again. After the murder of Gustav III, the chief of the police, Henrik Liljensparre, interviewed her about the attitude toward the King in the upper class opposition, and she is said to have been of some assistance in the investigation.

In 1792, Ulrica Arfvidsson was also consulted in connection to the conspiracy of Gustaf Mauritz Armfelt, who conspired to depose the guardian government of King Gustav IV Adolf of Sweden by an alliance with Russia. The co-conspirator of Armfelt, Magdalena Rudenschöld, was instructed by him to consult Arfvidsson, which she did three days after his departure from Sweden. Rudenschöld described the prediction in her correspondence to Armfelt. Arfvidsson consulted her coffee leaves and stated that the man of whom Rudenschöld was thinking (Armfelt) had recently left the country in anger over a child (the King) and a small man (the regent, Duke Charles), whom he would soon scare by an agreement with a woman with a non-royal crown on her head (Catherine the Great). She predicted that Armfelt risked to be revealed by the loss of a letter, which would be his ruin. As for Rudenschöld herself, Arfvidsson told her that she was observed and mentioned to Catherine the Great in letters by a fat man (the Russian ambassador Stackelberg), that she should be careful, and that great sorrows awaited her.

In 1797, she was consulted by Hedvig Ulrika Armfelt about the future of her exiled spouse, Gustaf Mauritz Armfelt, upon which she answered, that the days of sorrow would soon be over for Hedvig Ulrika Armfelt, and that all would be well for her spouse.

== Ulrica Arfvidsson in culture ==
Ulrica Arfvidsson is a character in Daniel Auber's opera Gustave III, ou Le bal masqué (Gustave III, or The Masked Ball), which used a libretto by French playwright Eugene Scribe.

In preparing his opera Gustavo III between 1857 and 1859, the Italian composer, Giuseppe Verdi, had his librettist, Antonio Somma, use Scribe's libretto as its basis. As a result of changes imposed by censors in both Naples and Rome, the title of the opera became Un ballo in maschera and it premiered in Rome on 17 February 1859.

She is also mentioned in the famed novel The Queen's Tiara by Carl Jonas Love Almquist.

She is the basis for Sofia Sparrow in The Stockholm Octavo.

== See also ==
- Henrik Gustaf Ulfvenklou
- Charlotta Roos, who also predicted misfortune to King Gustav III, something he reportedly referred to on his death bed after the assassination.
