= Gustave III =

Gustave III may refer to:

== People ==
- King Gustav III of Sweden

== Operas ==
- Daniel Auber's opera, Gustave III (Auber) with a libretto by Eugène Scribe, 1833
- Giuseppe Verdi's opera, Gustavo III (Verdi) from a libretto by Antonio Somma, 1857
