= Simon Boccanegra =

Opera by Giuseppe Verdi

- Opera by Giuseppe Verdi
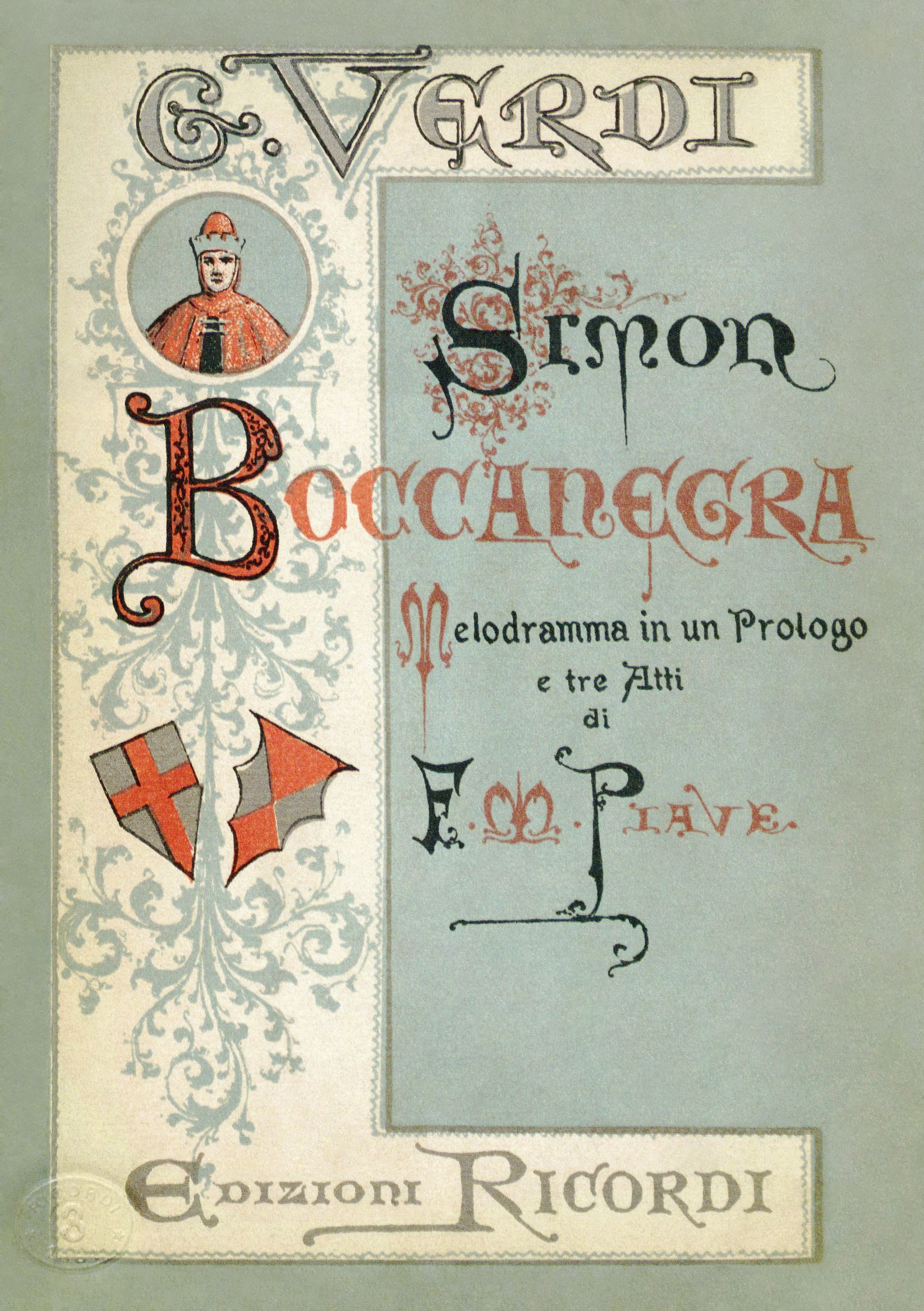
- First edition libretto for the 1881 revision
- Librettist: Francesco Maria Piave (first version); Arrigo Boito (second version)
- Language: Italian
- Based on: Antonio García Gutiérrez's Simón Bocanegra (1843)
- Premiere: 12 March 1857 (first version); 24 March 1881 (second version); La Fenice, Venice (first version); La Scala, Milan (second version)

Simon Boccanegra (Italian: [siˈmom ˌbokkaˈneːɡra]) is an opera with a prologue and three acts by Giuseppe Verdi to an Italian libretto by Francesco Maria Piave, based on the play Simón Bocanegra (1843) by Antonio García Gutiérrez.

Simon Boccanegra was first performed at Teatro La Fenice in Venice on 12 March 1857. Given the complications of the original plot and the generally poor popular response – although the critical one was more encouraging – the opera dropped out of favour after 1866. Finally, 23 years later, Verdi's publisher persuaded the composer to revise the opera, with text changes to be prepared by Arrigo Boito, the librettist who aspired to work with the ageing composer on a project which eventually became a new opera, Otello, but to whom Verdi had not totally committed at that time.

The revised version of Simon Boccanegra, with the now-famous Council Chamber scene, was first performed at La Scala in Milan on 24 March 1881. It is this version which is the one most frequently performed today.

== Composition history: the 1857 version ==
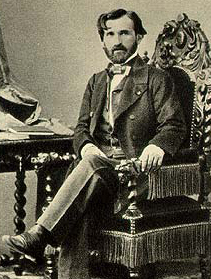
Verdi in 1859

Musicologist and author Julian Budden points to three projects which the composer had in mind when, at the beginning of 1855, he turned down an invitation from La Fenice to write a new opera for them for the following year. He responded: "the chief obstacle is my unshakable determination not to bind myself anymore to a definite period for either the composition or the production". While that approach did not turn out to be practicable at that time, it was an ultimate goal and, in aiming to achieve it, his partner of the previous four years, Giuseppina Strepponi greatly encouraged it when she wrote to him at the time of his frustrations two years earlier when working in Paris on Les vêpres siciliennes.

The only project for which there was forward motion was towards accomplishing his long-planned Re Lear, an opera to be based on King Lear, for which his new librettist (following Salvadore Cammarano's death) was Antonio Somma. But a year later, when overseeing a revival of La traviata at La Fenice, he agreed to a new opera for that house for the 1856/7 season, and he proposed the Gutiérrez play, which Budden presumes he had read in translation. Budden also presumes that the translation had been done by Strepponi, because she had been the translator of Gutiérrez' other play El trovador which had become Il trovatore.

The somewhat convoluted plot of Simon Boccanegra can be hard to follow. Budden notes: "All the characters define themselves against an ingeniously shifting pattern of intrigue such as can be highly effective in a play but well-nigh impossible to follow in an opera". Verdi had gone so far as to actually write out the scenario in prose, which he then submitted to Piave in August; all that he expected from his librettist was that it would be turned into poetry, so Verdi balked somewhat when the censors demanded a complete poetic version: "what does it matter for the moment it's in prose or verse?" He pushed harder, stating that "I plan to compose music for a prose libretto! What do you think of that?" In the end, there was a poetic version and all was well: it was accepted by the opera house and the censors.

Beginning in July and throughout most of the period of the preparation of the libretto, the composer and Strepponi had been in Paris taking care of securing various performance and publication rights, including working on a translated version of Il trovatore, the opera which became Le trouvère. Piave was informed that Verdi's stay would need to be lengthened and everything would be handled between them and the Venetian authorities by mail.

However, Verdi's dissatisfaction with some of the librettist's work led him to find a local collaborator to help revise some of the sections. Accordingly, he called upon an Italian exile in Paris, the politician, former professor of law, poet and writer Giuseppe Montanelli, to do this. Piave learned nothing of the revisions until he received a note from Verdi: "Here is the libretto, shortened and altered more or less as it must be. You can put your name to or it, just as you please". However, he also learned nothing of the anonymous collaborator either. After the premiere of Le trouvère on 12 January 1857, Verdi and Strepponi left Paris to return to Italy, then both went to Venice for the March premiere.

However, the relationship was soon restored and Piave came to Sant'Agata in April to work on some revisions, but it was the libretto which came in for the heaviest criticism: "It was generally condemned as one of the most unintelligible to have reached the stage" notes Kimbell and its general dark and gloomy feel was to affect its fortunes for many years.

== Composition history: the 1881 revision ==
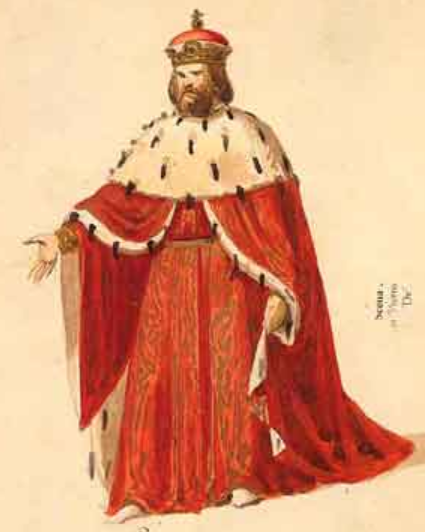
Doge's costume for the 1881 revision

In 1868, Giulio Ricordi suggested the idea of revisions to Boccanegra; the idea was again broached ten years later, early in 1879, but was shrugged off by Verdi with a note saying that the 1857 score, which had been sent to the composer for review, would remain untouched "just as you sent it to me". Persisting with further attempts to convince the composer, Ricordi had also broached the idea of a collaboration with Arrigo Boito for a new opera based on Shakespeare's Othello. Musicologist Roger Parker speculates that Verdi's final agreement to revise Boccanegra was based on a desire to "test the possibility" of working with Boito before possibly embarking on the larger project.

Once Verdi began to re-look at his earlier work, objections – and new ideas – began to emerge: "the score is not possible as it stands" and "I shall have to redo all the second act [1857: act 2, which became act 1 in the 1881 revision] and give it more contrast and variety, more life" are examples of his reasoning, which he laid out in a letter to Ricordi in November 1880. His principal concern was how to make changes to the 1857, act 2. "I have said in general it needs something to give life and variety to the drama's excessive gloom", he writes and he continues by recalling:

two magnificent letters of Petrarch's, one addressed to [the historical] Boccanegra, the other to the [then-]Doge of Venice, warning them not to start a fratricidal war, and reminding them that both were sons of the same mother, Italy, and so on. This idea of an Italian fatherland at this time was quite sublime!

In spite of the complexity of many of Boito's proposed ideas, along with his alternative scenarios, which are expressed in a long letter to Verdi(most of which the composer regarded as excessive), the Council Chamber scene emerged as the focus of the new collaboration. Although he had confidence in the young librettist's abilities ("[The scene] written by you could not possibly be dull"), Verdi did caution Boito that he appeared to be "aiming at a perfection impossible here. I [Verdi] aim lower and am more optimistic than you and I don't despair", in essence, expressing an unwillingness to re-write the opera as completely as Boito had proposed. It would have been far more work than the composer wished to be involved in at the time.

The pair spent the latter part of 1880 and into January 1881 with back-and-forth additions and revisions (the composer in Genoa, the librettist in Milan and meeting only once), all of which are heavily documented in the Verdi-Boito correspondence, the Carteggio Verdi-Boito, and significantly quoted in Budden. All this was the build-up to performances in Milan the following March, although the composer was constantly concerned about the suitability of the singers engaged there for that season, and he threatened to withdraw the opera on more than one occasion.

The result was the contrast, which Parker describes, between the original 1857 act 2 finale, "set in a large square in Genoa, [as] a conventional four-movement concertante finale, a grand ceremonial scene" whereas, in the 1881 revision, "[Verdi] injected into the heart of the work an episode of enormous vividness and power, enriching the character of Boccanegra in such a way that his subsequent death scene gains considerably in impressiveness". And, as Budden puts it, "Simone (sic) rises to spiritual greatness. For the first time, his moral authority puts forth all its strength, ... positively as in the appeal for peace ..."

== Performance history ==
Original 1857 version

Francesco Maria Piave, librettist of the 1857 version

While not a popular success, it did garner some critical acclaim, "with the music being praised for its fidelity to the text, the orchestration for its elegance, the melody for its inspiration" noted the Gazzetta Musicale, but Budden notes that "complaints of 'obscurity', 'severity', harmonic abstruseness' are heard from even the most respectful of critics". And Verdi himself was fairly blunt in his assessment: "I've had a fiasco in Venice almost as great as that of La traviata" he reported to Clara Maffei.

Following its 1857 premiere, Simon Boccanegra was performed in Reggio Emilia, "where it triumphed ... ... and again in Naples in 1858 ..." There was similar acclaim after the Rome presentation about the same time, but "on the other hand, Boccanegra had been laughed off the stage in Florence" and "had been a fiasco at La Scala in 1859".

It was given in Malta in 1860, Madrid and Lisbon in 1861, and Buenos Aires and Montevideo in 1862, but, after that, it almost completely disappeared with only a sporadic performance or two, including Corfu in 1870 and Alexandria in late 1880.

A concert performance of the original version, possibly its first hearing in 100 years (and its UK premiere), took place at the Golders Green Hippodrome in London on 2 August 1975 before an invited audience "masterminded" by Julian Budden with Sesto Bruscantini in the title role and André Turp as Gabriele. This production was broadcast on 1 January 1976 and issued on CD. It was also performed by the Royal Opera, London in concert in June 1995 with Anthony Michaels-Moore and José Cura and staged at Covent Garden in June 1997 with Sergei Leiferkus and Plácido Domingo in the two aforementioned male roles. The Amelias in the 1995 and 1997 versions were Amanda Roocroft and Kallen Esperian respectively.

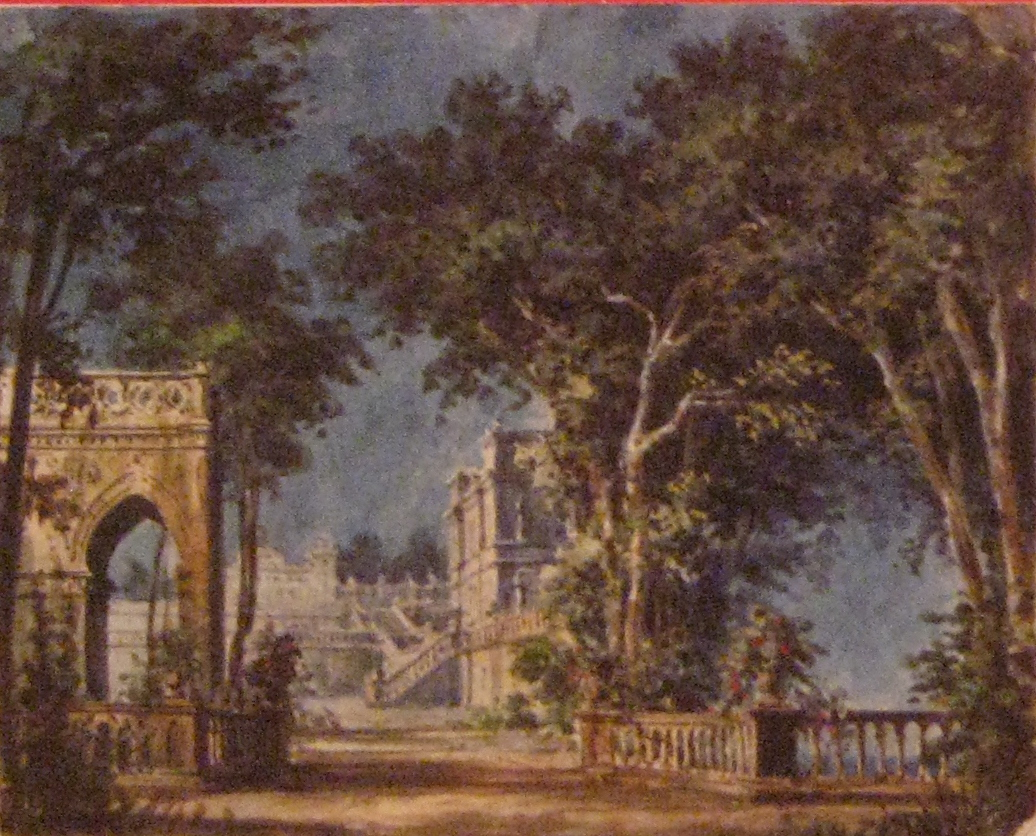
Set design by Girolamo Magnani for 1881 revision

In August 1999 there was a set of performances at the Festival della Valle d'Itria in Martina Franca, which was recorded. That same year it was given by New York Grand Opera, this being its first New York performance. Sarasota Opera, in its "Verdi Cycle" series of all of the composer's works, gave it its American premiere in 1992.

Revised version of 1881

It is this later version, unveiled in 1881 in Milan, and given in Vienna and Paris in 1882 and 1883, respectively, that has become part of the standard operatic repertory. The British premiere did not occur until 1948, when it was given in English at Sadler's Wells, with Arnold Matters (Simone), James Johnston (Adorno), Joyce Gartside (Amelia) and Howell Glynne (Fiesco).

== Roles ==
Role	Voice type	Premiere cast 12 March 1857 (Conductor: – )	Revised version Premiere cast 24 March 1881 (Conductor: Franco Faccio)
Simon Boccanegra, a corsair, later the first Doge of Genoa	baritone	Leone Giraldoni	Victor Maurel
Jacopo Fiesco, a Genoese nobleman, known as Andrea Grimaldi	bass	Giuseppe Echeverria	Édouard de Reszke
Maria Boccanegra, his adopted daughter and actual granddaughter, known as Amelia Grimaldi	soprano	Luigia Bendazzi	Anna D'Angeri
Gabriele Adorno, a Genoese gentleman	tenor	Carlo Negrini	Francesco Tamagno
Paolo Albiani, a goldsmith and the Doge's favourite courtier	baritone	Giacomo Vercellini	Federico Salvati
Pietro, a Genoese popular leader and courtier	bass	Andrea Bellini	Giovanni Bianco
Captain of the Crossbowmen	tenor		Angelo Fiorentini
Amelia's maid	mezzo-soprano		Fernanda Capelli
Soldiers, sailors, people, senators, the Doge's court, prisoners – Chorus

== Synopsis ==
Time: The middle of the 14th century.
Place: In and around Genoa.

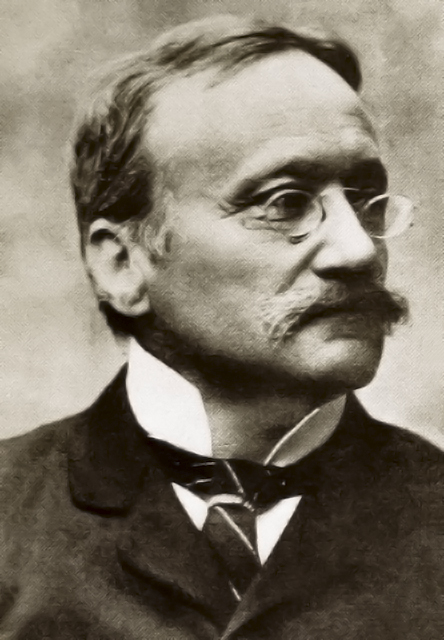
Arrigo Boito, librettist of the 1881 revision

=== Prologue ===
==== (Act 1 in the 1857 original) ====
A piazza in front of the Fieschi palace

Paolo Albiani, a plebeian, tells his ally Pietro that in the forthcoming election of the Doge, his choice for the plebeian candidate is Simon Boccanegra. Boccanegra arrives and is persuaded to stand when Paolo hints that if Boccanegra becomes Doge, the aristocratic Jacopo Fiesco will surely allow him to wed his daughter Maria. When Boccanegra has gone, Paolo gossips about Boccanegra's love affair with Maria Fiesco – Boccanegra and Maria have had a child, and the furious Fiesco has locked his daughter away in his palace. Pietro rallies a crowd of citizens to support Boccanegra. After the crowd has dispersed, Fiesco comes out of his palace, stricken with grief; Maria has just died (Il lacerato spirito – "The tortured soul of a sad father"). He swears vengeance on Boccanegra for destroying his family. When he meets Boccanegra he does not inform him of Maria's death. Boccanegra offers reconciliation and Fiesco promises clemency only if Boccanegra lets him have his granddaughter. Boccanegra explains he cannot because the child, put in the care of a nurse, has vanished. He enters the palace and finds the body of his beloved just before crowds pour in, hailing him as the new Doge.

=== Act 1 ===
==== (Act 2 in the 1857 original) ====
Leo Nucci and Barbara Frittoli sing "Figlia! a tal nome io palpito" at the Liceu, 2015

Bass Giorgio Tozzi as Fiesco

[Twenty-five years have passed. Historically the action has moved from 1339, the year of Simon's election in the prologue, forward to 1363, the year of the historical Simone Boccanegra's death – for acts 1, 2 and 3.]

[The Doge has exiled many of his political opponents and confiscated their property. Among them is Jacopo Fiesco, who has been living in the Grimaldi palace, using the name Andrea Grimaldi to avoid discovery and plotting with Boccanegra's enemies to overthrow the Doge. The Grimaldis have adopted an orphaned child of unknown parentage after discovering her in a convent (she is in fact Boccanegra's child, Maria – known as Amelia – named after her mother, and she is Fiesco's granddaughter). They called her Amelia, hoping that she would be the heir to their family's fortune, their sons having been exiled and their own baby daughter having died. Amelia is now a young woman.]

Scene 1: A garden in the Grimaldi palace, before sunrise

Amelia is awaiting her lover, Gabriele Adorno (Aria: Come in quest'ora bruna – "How in the morning light / The sea and stars shine brightly"). She suspects him of plotting against the Doge and when he arrives she warns him of the dangers of political conspiracy. Word arrives that the Doge is coming. Amelia, fearing that the Doge will force her to marry Paolo, now his councilor, urges Adorno to ask her guardian Andrea (in reality, Fiesco) for permission for them to marry: Sì, sì dell'ara il giubilo / contrasti il fato avverso – "Yes, let the joy of marriage be set against unkind fate".

[1857 original version: the duet ended with a cabaletta (set to the same words as the 1881 text) then "a coda and a battery of chords followed by applause."]

Fiesco reveals to Adorno that Amelia is not a Grimaldi, but a foundling adopted by the family. When Adorno says that he does not care, Fiesco blesses the marriage. Boccanegra enters and tells Amelia that he has pardoned her exiled brothers. She tells him that she is in love, but not with Paolo, whom she refuses to marry. Boccanegra has no desire to force Amelia into a marriage against her will. She tells him that she was adopted and that she has one souvenir of her mother, a picture in a locket. The two compare Amelia's picture with Boccanegra's, and Boccanegra realizes that she is his long-lost daughter. Finally reunited, they are overcome with joy. Amelia goes into the palace. Soon after, Paolo arrives to find out if Amelia has accepted him. Boccanegra tells him that the marriage will not take place. Furious, Paolo arranges for Amelia to be kidnapped.

Scene 2: The council chamber

[1881 revision: This entire scene was added by Verdi and Boito in place of the 1857 scene, which took place in a large square in Genoa.]

The Doge encourages his councillors to make peace with Venice. He is interrupted by the sounds of a mob calling for blood. Paolo suspects that his kidnapping plot has failed. The Doge prevents anyone leaving the council chamber and orders the doors to be thrown open. A crowd bursts in, chasing Adorno. Adorno confesses to killing Lorenzino, a plebeian, who had kidnapped Amelia, claiming to have done so at the order of a high-ranking official. Adorno incorrectly guesses the official was Boccanegra and is about to attack him when Amelia rushes in and stops him (Aria: Nell'ora soave – "At that sweet hour which invites ecstasy / I was walking alone by the sea"). She describes her abduction and escape. Before she is able to identify her kidnapper, fighting breaks out once more. Boccanegra establishes order and has Adorno arrested for the night (Aria: Plebe! Patrizi! Popolo! – "Plebeians! Patricians! Inheritors / Of a fierce history"). He orders the crowd to make peace and they praise his mercy. Realizing that Paolo is responsible for the kidnapping, Boccanegra places him in charge of finding the culprit. He then makes everyone, including Paolo, utter a curse on the kidnapper.

=== Act 2 ===
==== (Act 3 in the 1857 original) ====
The Doge's apartments

[1881 revised version: There are some small adjustments in this act which include expanding Paolo's opening aria, thus giving him greater stature in the work: Me stesso ho maledetto! / "I have cursed myself", the wording of which was originally: O doge ingrato ... ch'io rinunci Amelia e i suoi tesori? / "O ungrateful Doge! ... Must I give up Amelia and her charms".]

Paolo has imprisoned Fiesco. Determined to kill Boccanegra, Paolo pours a slow-acting poison into the Doge's water, and then tries to convince Fiesco to murder Boccanegra in return for his freedom. Fiesco refuses. Paolo next suggests to Adorno that Amelia is the Doge's mistress, hoping Adorno will murder Boccanegra in a jealous rage. Adorno is furious (Aria: Sento avvampar nell'anima – "I feel a furious jealousy / Setting my soul on fire"). Amelia enters the Doge's apartments, seeming to confirm Adorno's suspicions, and he angrily accuses her of infidelity. She claims only to love him, but cannot reveal her secret – that Boccanegra is her father – because Adorno's family were killed by the Doge. Adorno hides as Boccanegra is heard approaching. Amelia confesses to Boccanegra that she is in love with his enemy Adorno. Boccanegra is angry, but tells his daughter that if the young nobleman changes his ways, he may pardon him. He asks Amelia to leave, and then takes a drink of the poisoned water, which Paolo has placed on the table. He falls asleep. Adorno emerges and is about to kill Boccanegra, when Amelia returns in time to stop him. Boccanegra wakes and reveals to Adorno that Amelia is his daughter. Adorno begs for Amelia's forgiveness (Trio: Perdon, Amelia ... Indomito – "Forgive me, Amelia ... A wild, / Jealous love was mine"). Noises of fighting are heard – Paolo has stirred up a revolution against the Doge. Adorno promises to fight for Boccanegra, who vows that Adorno shall marry Amelia if he can crush the rebels.

=== Act 3 ===
==== (Act 4 in the 1857 original) ====
[1857 original version: Act 4 opened with a double male voice chorus, and a confused dialogue involving references to details in the original play.]

Inside the Doge's palace

The uprising against the Doge has been put down. Paolo has been condemned to death for fighting with the rebels against the Doge. Fiesco is released from prison by the Doge's men. On his way to the scaffold, Paolo boasts to Fiesco that he has poisoned Boccanegra. Fiesco is deeply shocked. He confronts Boccanegra, who is now dying from Paolo's poison. Boccanegra recognizes his old enemy and tells Fiesco that Amelia is his granddaughter. Fiesco feels great remorse and tells Boccanegra about the poison. Adorno and Amelia, newly married, arrive to find the two men reconciled. Boccanegra tells Amelia that Fiesco is her grandfather and, before he dies, names Adorno his successor. The crowd mourns the death of the Doge.

== Music ==
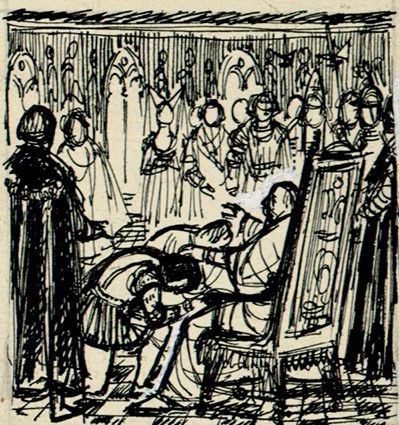
Disegno per copertina di libretto, drawing for Simon Boccanegra (1955).

Budden makes a useful observation on the musical qualities of the original version: "all the devices that we associate with the term bel canto are sparingly used" and he suggests that, at mid-century, "this amounted to a denial of Italy's national birthright" for an audience brought up on the conventions employed by Vincenzo Bellini or Gaetano Donizetti. In his "Introduction to the 1881 Score", James Hepokoski emphasizes that Budden's assertion appeared to be true, since the 1857 original "resounded with clear echoes of [Verdi's] earlier style" and that he employed the known techniques but, at the same time, moved away from them, so that:

the basic musical conventions of the Risorgimento (separate numbers with breaks for applause, multi-movement arias and duets with repetitive codas, cadenzas and repeated cabalettas, static concertato ensembles, and so on) were indeed present, if usually modified [so that] the musical discourse was characteristically terse, angular, and muscular.

Budden goes on to suggest the implications of this move away from the standard forms, albeit that "[it] was a daring, innovative work. Without altering the letter of the contemporary Italian forms, it certainly altered their spirit ... Quite unheard of was a protagonist without a single extended lyrical solo to himself. Additionally, Budden suggests that musically "the richness and subtlety of the musical language acquired over twenty-four years suffice to fill out Simon's personality further.

The 1881 revisions then, which, in most cases, did not require changes in the libretto, were made to the music by Verdi. As David Kimbell demonstrates with a few examples, areas such as which illustrate more refined use of the orchestra include the first scene of the Prologue: "the dialogue, instead of being punctuated by the customary figurations of accompanied recitative, is set against a gravely flowing orchestral theme."
