= Ebel riot =

1793 riot in Stockholm, Sweden

Ebel riot (Swedish: Ebelska upploppet) was a riot taking place in Stockholm 7 January 1793.

The riot took place when a group of burgher men, among them Ebel, was insulted by a royal guardsman and was given the sympathy by a crowd of people, who accompanied them to the police and then to the Royal Palace to complain and demand action, while a speech was made by Ebel, before the crowd was dissolved by the military.

The riot was, in fact, not of a violent nature. However, it was perceived as such by the regent duke Charles and Gustaf Adolf Reuterholm, who were reportedly greatly frightened, and it is resulted in the abortion of the enlightened policy of the guardian government: Nils Henric Liljensparre lost his position for having frightened the duke-regent by exaggerating the riot, Ebel was exiled and five other sentenced to prison on water and bread, all crowds and private clubs were banned and public bars, pubs and other gathering places were to be closed at nine o'clock.
