= Jacob Johan Anckarström the Elder =

Swedish nobleman (1729–1777)

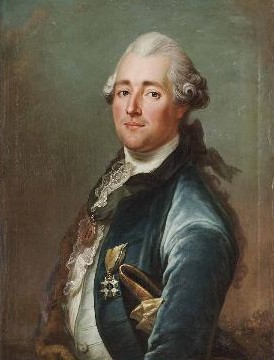
Jacob Johan Anckarström the Elder

Jacob Johan Anckarström the Elder (11 September 1729 – 6 April 1777) was a Swedish nobleman and colonel of the Anckarström family. He was a knight of the Order of the Sword (from 1761) and the Order of Vasa (from 1775) and the father of Jacob Johan Anckarström, who assassinated Gustav III.

== Life ==
Born at Uppland, he was the son of Major Clas Anckarström and Brigita Charlotta Realize Stjerna. He was raised by his stepfather, a colonel Faber. He first joined the army aged 15, as a hantlangare in the artillery, and in 1745 travelled to France with lieutenant-colonel Leslie. He was immediately employed in the Swedish Royal Suédois regiment, rising to lieutenant aged 18 (in 1747) and wounded at the 1746 Siege of Namur.

He returned to Sweden in 1748 and in 1750 (aged only 21) he was promoted to be a captain with the Nylands regemente. During the 1750s he was ordered to Sveaborg (Suomenlinna), then outside Helsinki. In 1757 he was sent to the Pomeranian War, in which he was captured and held prisoner in Demmin. In 1759 his Prussian captors allowed him to leave captivity to go to Sweden to take up a legacy from his father, who had died that year. In 1760 he married Hedvig Ulrika Drufva, daughter of the governor Peter Drufva - they had three sons, including Jacob Johan the Younger. He died, aged 47, at Lindö sätesgård.

== Sources ==
- (in Swedish) Vilhelm Fredrik Palmblad: Biographiskt Lexicon öfver namnkunnige Svenska Män, v. 1 - 1835, s.180-183
