= Un ballo in maschera =

1859 opera by Giuseppe Verdi

- Opera by Giuseppe Verdi
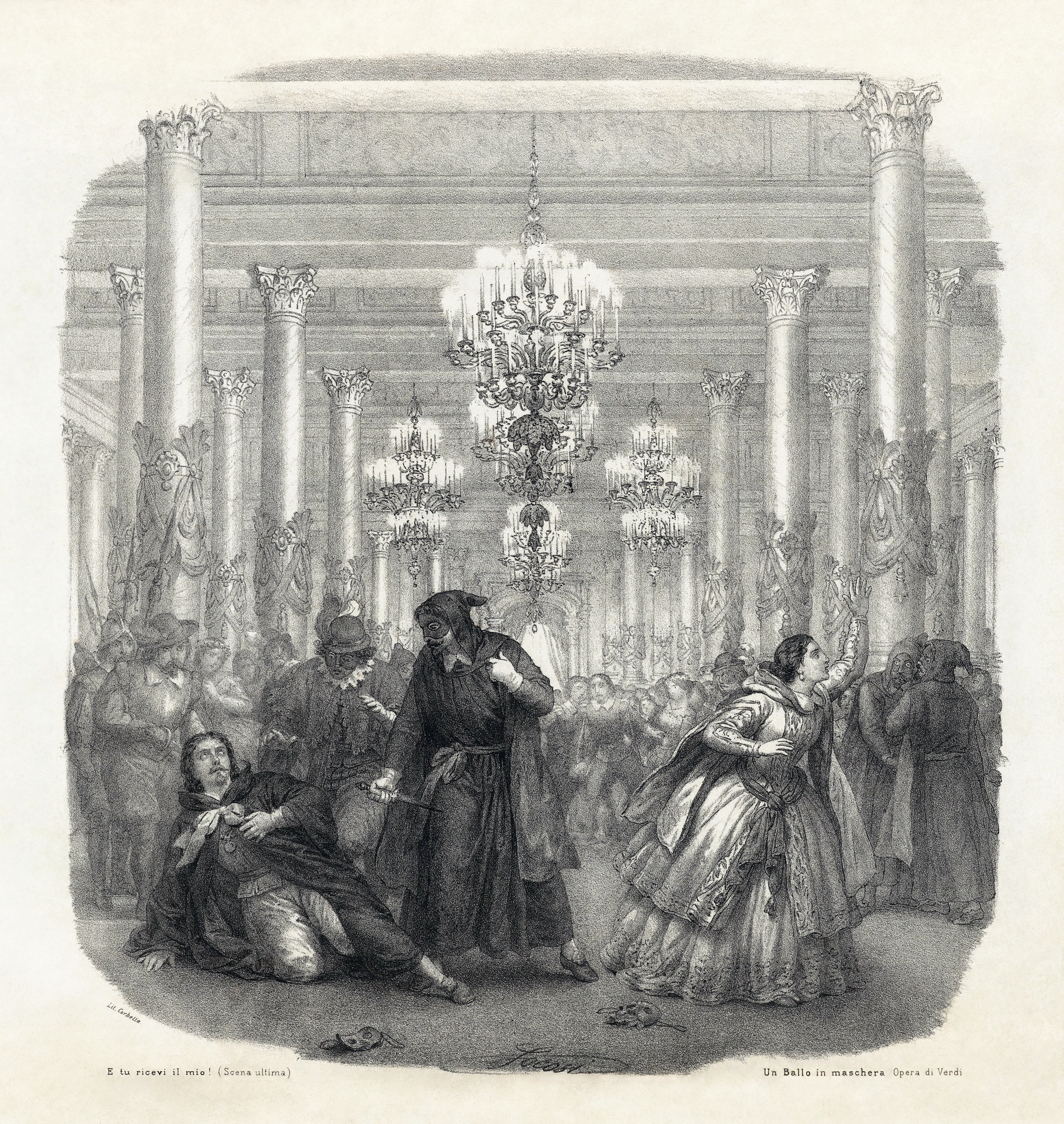
- Frontispiece of the 1860 vocal score, depicting the final scene of the opera
- Translation: A Masked Ball
- Librettist: Antonio Somma
- Language: Italian
- Based on: Eugène Scribe's libretto for Daniel Auber's 1833 Gustave III, ou Le bal masqué
- Premiere: 17 February 1859; Teatro Apollo, Rome

"È scherzo od è follia"
Enrico Caruso, Frieda Hempel, Maria Duchêne, Andrés de Segurola and Léon Rothier (1914), from act 1, scene 2

Un ballo in maschera ('A Masked Ball') is an 1859 opera in three acts by Giuseppe Verdi. The text, by Antonio Somma, was based on Eugène Scribe's libretto for Daniel Auber's 1833 five act opera, Gustave III, ou Le bal masqué.

The plot concerns the assassination in 1792 of King Gustav III of Sweden who was shot, as the result of a political conspiracy, while attending a masked ball, dying of his wounds thirteen days later.

It was to take over two years between the commission from Naples, planned for a production there, and its premiere performance at the Teatro Apollo in Rome on 17 February 1859. In becoming the Un ballo in maschera which we know today, Verdi's opera (and his libretto) underwent a significant series of transformations and title changes, caused by a combination of censorship regulations in both Naples and Rome, as well as by the political situation in France in January 1858. Based on the Scribe libretto and begun as Gustavo III set in Stockholm, it became Una vendetta in domino set in Stettin, and finally Un ballo in maschera set in Boston during the colonial era. It became one of the most frustrating experiences of Verdi's career.

From the mid-20th century, it has become more common for the setting to revert to its original 18th-century Stockholm location. A re-creation of the original Gustavo III has been staged in Sweden.

== Composition history ==
For a full account of the evolution of the opera which eventually became Un ballo in maschera, see Gustavo III (Verdi)

=== 1857: From Gustavo III to Una vendetta in domino ===
A commission by the Teatro San Carlo in Naples in early 1857 led Verdi to begin to oversee the finalization of the libretto (also by Somma) for Re Lear with the aim of presenting the finished opera during the 1858 carnival season. When this proved to be impracticable, Verdi turned to the subject of King Gustav III's assassination as portrayed in Scribe and Auber's opera, albeit not an historically accurate narrative. That subject was well known and had been used by other composers, including Saverio Mercadante for his Il reggente in 1843.

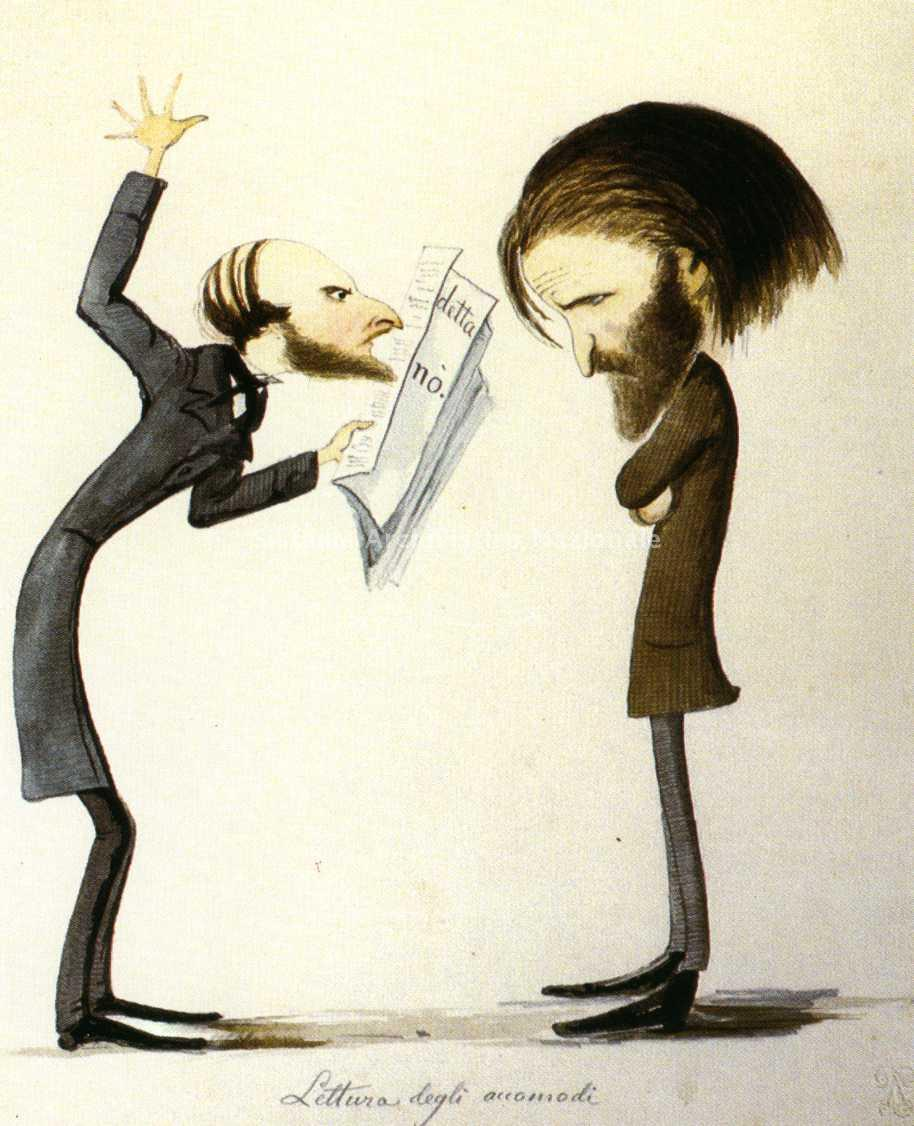
Verdi and the Naples censor when preparing "Ballo", 1857–58, caricature by Delfico

For the libretto, Scribe retained the names of some of the historical figures involved (including fortune teller Ulrica Arfvidsson), the conspiracy, and the killing at the masked ball, but, as noted by Budden, "it was a simple case of 'cherchez la femme'": for the rest of the play Scribe invented the romance between the King and the fictional Amélie, the wife of the king's secretary and best friend, and adds characters and situations such as Oscar, the page boy.

Somma's new libretto, known as Gustavo III, was presented to the censors in Naples by late 1857. By November, Verdi informed Somma that objections had been raised and revisions demanded by the censors, the most significant of which was the refusal to allow the depiction of a monarch on the stage - and especially the monarch's murder. As had happened with Rigoletto, changes in characters' names and titles were proposed (the King of Sweden became the Duke of Pomerania; Anckarström became Count Renato) and the location was moved from Stockholm to Stettin.

Working together with Somma over Christmas, Verdi accommodated these changes. Somma was asked to change the names of the characters on the Gustave libretto while Verdi worked on completing sketches of the music. The name of the opera became Una vendetta in domino.

By 9 January 1858, prior to setting out for Naples, Verdi wrote from his home to the San Carlo that "the opera is done and even here I am working on the full score". The composer then travelled to Naples and rehearsals of Una vendetta were about to begin when, on 14 January 1858, three Italians attempted to assassinate Emperor Napoleon III in Paris, an event which was to affect the opera's production.

=== 1858: The censor blocks Una vendetta ===
The imposition of still further, more stringent requirements by the censor incurred Verdi's wrath. He broke his contract, returned to Sant'Agata in April, and was sued by the management of the San Carlo house. This provoked him to lodge a counter-claim against the theatre for damages and, eventually, the legal fight ended.

It was during this period of turmoil that Verdi was to describe the previous sixteen years of his composing life: in a letter to Countess Clara Maffei, he states: "From Nabucco, you may say, I have never had one hour of peace. Sixteen years in the galleys!"

=== 1859: Una vendetta becomes Un ballo in maschera ===
When the legal issues were resolved within a few months, Verdi was free to present the libretto and musical outline of Gustave III (which was basically Una vendetta with characters' names and locations changed) to the Rome Opera. There, the censors demanded further changes. Removing the action from Europe, the location became Boston during the British colonial period and the leading character became Riccardo, the Count (or Earl) of Warwick. At this point, the opera became Un ballo in maschera set in North America.

== Performance history ==
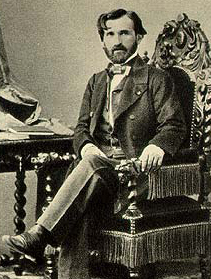
Verdi in 1859

=== Notable productions ===
Un ballo in maschera received its premiere performance at the Teatro Apollo in Rome on 17 February 1859 and was immediately successful. The opera was first seen in the US in New York on 11 February 1861 at the Academy of Music in Manhattan for seven performances, conducted by Emanuele Muzio; the future president Abraham Lincoln attended one of the performances. Two further performances were given at the old Brooklyn Academy of Music on Montague Street. The first performance in the UK was on 15 June of that year.

In the 20th century, especially after a 1935 production in Copenhagen, many modern stagings have restored the original Swedish setting and characters' names. On 7 January 1955, Marian Anderson, singing the role of Ulrica, broke the "color barrier" at the Metropolitan Opera, becoming the first African-American vocal soloist to appear with that company. As part of the "Verdi Cycle," an effort to produce all of Verdi's music, Sarasota Opera mounted the opera in 1991.

A "hypothetical reconstruction" of Gustavo III, based on the unorchestrated original and much of Una vendetta "grafted" onto Un ballo's score, occurred in a production by the Gothenburg Opera in Gothenburg, Sweden in 2002.

The opera has become a staple of the repertoire and is now performed frequently.

=== Homosexuality of Gustav III ===
Scribe's libretto for Gustave III includes details that could be understood as signs of the king's homosexuality. Verdi and Somma eliminated many of these coded signals, but new codes take their place, particularly relating to the character of Oscar. David Richards has argued that although the opera was no longer explicitly based on Gustav III, Verdi deliberately deviated from his usual practice and set Oscar for a soprano – despite disliking women singing men's parts: "Verdi goes as far as one could go within the repressive conventions of his period to portray Gustavo (based on a widely known flamboyantly homosexual ruler) as either a gay man or, at a minimum, a bisexual man". Richards believes this therefore demonstrates that "Verdi's art embraces all forms of sexualities". Ralph Hexter has examined the "masking" of homosexual aspects of the main character and how it relates to the idea of masking in the opera as a whole.

Several productions have attempted to draw out this suggestion – most notably the staging by Göran Gentele for the Royal Swedish Opera in 1959 where Gustavo is having an affair with his Oscar even while pining for Amelia, and also the 1993 staging by Götz Friedrich for Berlin.

== Roles ==
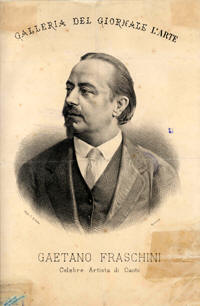
Tenor Gaetano Fraschini, the first Riccardo

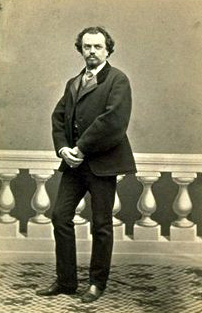
Baritone Leone Giraldoni, the first Renato (c. 1865)

Roles, voice types, premiere cast
Role BO: Original Boston setting and characters SW: Swedish setting and characters	Voice type	Premiere cast (BO) 17 February 1859
BO: Riccardo, Earl of Warwick and governor of Boston; SW: Gustavo, King of Sweden	tenor	Gaetano Fraschini
BO: Amelia, wife of Renato, in love with Riccardo; SW: Amelia, wife of Anckarström, in love with Gustavo	soprano	Eugenia Julienne-Dejean
BO: Renato, husband of Amelia and Riccardo's secretary, best friend and confidant SW: Count Anckarström, husband of Amelia and Gustavo's secretary, best friend and confidant	baritone	Leone Giraldoni
BO: Oscar, Riccardo's page SW: Oscar, Gustavo's page	coloratura soprano (en travesti)	Pamela Scotti
BO: Ulrica; SW: Madame Arvidson, a fortune-teller	contralto	Zelina Sbriscia
A judge	tenor	Giuseppe Bazzoli
BO: Silvano; SW: Cristiano	bass	Stefano Santucci
Amelia's servant	tenor	Luigi Fossi
BO: Samuel; SW: Count Ribbing	bass	Cesare Rossi
BO: Tom; SW: Count Horn	bass	Giovanni Bernardoni

== Synopsis ==
Place: Stockholm, Sweden, or Boston, Massachusetts
Time: March 1792 in Sweden, or the end of the 17th century in Boston

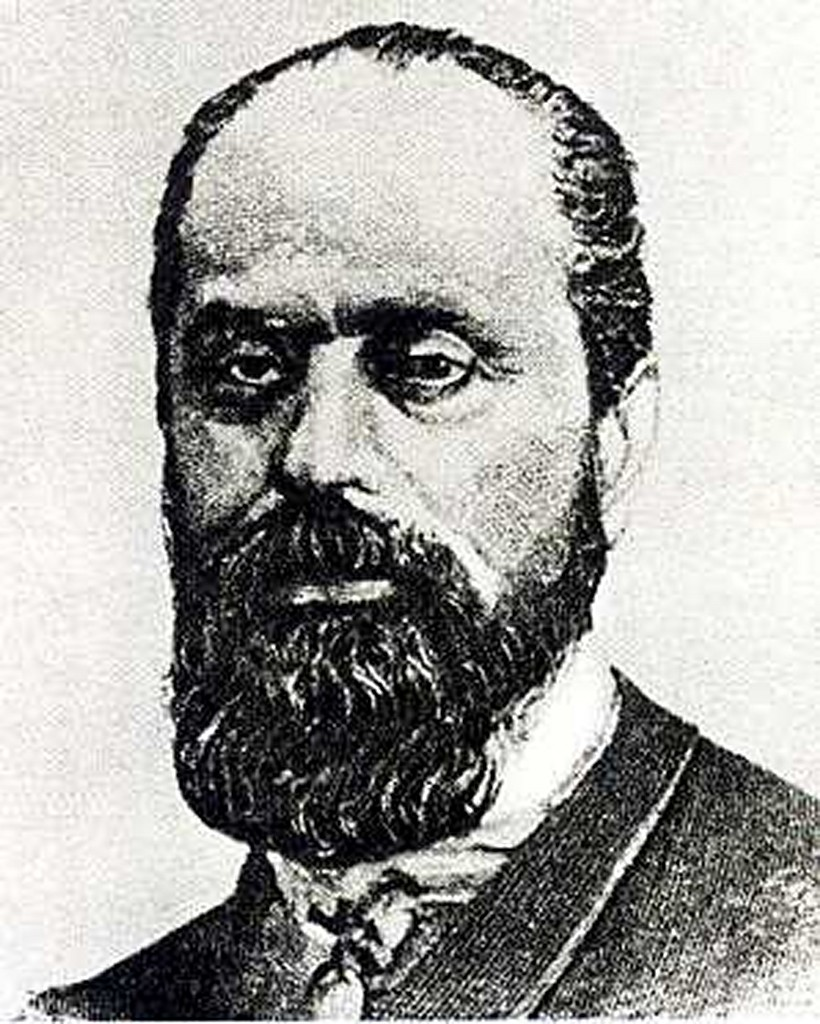
Antonio Somma, the librettist of the opera

=== Act 1 ===
Scene 1: A public audience at Riccardo's palace, attended by his supporters, but also by his enemies who hope for his demise.

Riccardo (Gustavo) reviews the list of guests who will attend an upcoming masked ball. He is elated to see the name of the woman he loves on the list – Amelia, the wife of his friend and advisor, Renato (Count Anckarström). (Aria: La rivedrò nell'estasi / "There I will be in ecstasy to see her again"). When Renato arrives, he tries to warn Riccardo about the growing conspiracy against him (aria: Alla vita che t'arride / "Your life, so full of joy and hope"), but Riccardo refuses to listen to his words.

Next, Riccardo is presented with a complaint against a fortune-teller named Ulrica (Madame Arvidson), accused of witchcraft. A magistrate calls for her banishment, but Oscar the page defends her (Aria: Volta la terrea / "Turning her eyes from the earth"). Riccardo resolves to investigate for himself and tells the members of the court to disguise themselves and to meet him at Ulrica's lodging later that day.

Scene 2: At Ulrica's dwelling

Ulrica summons her magical powers: Re dell'abisso, affrettati / "King of the abyss, make haste". Disguised as a fisherman, Riccardo arrives before the others. He makes the fortune of a sailor named Silvano come true by spiriting a document of promotion into his pouch, convincing the crowd of the truth of Ulrica's powers. When he realizes that Amelia is coming to see Ulrica, he hides and watches. Alone with Ulrica, Amelia confesses that she is tormented by her love for Riccardo, and asks for a means to bring peace to her heart. Ulrica tells her to gather a certain herb with magical powers; Riccardo resolves to be there when she does so. Amelia leaves.

Now Riccardo presents himself again, along with all of the courtiers, and asks to have his fortune told. (Aria: Di' tu se fedele / "Tell me if the sea awaits me faithfully"). Ulrica reveals that he will be killed by the next man who shakes his hand. He laughingly dismisses her prophecy and offers his hand to the courtiers, who refuse to take it. Renato arrives and shakes Riccardo's hand in greeting. Riccardo's true identity is now revealed and he is acclaimed by the people.

=== Act 2 ===
On the outskirts of the town, at the gallows-place. Midnight

Amelia, conquering her fears, has come here alone to pick the herb of which Ulrica told her (Aria: Ma dall'arido stelo divulsa / "But when I have plucked the herb"). She is surprised by Riccardo, who has come to meet her, and the two finally declare their love for each other.

Unexpectedly, Renato arrives, and Amelia covers her face with her veil before he can recognize her. Renato explains to Riccardo that the conspirators are pursuing him, and his life is in danger. Riccardo leaves, making Renato promise to escort the veiled woman safely back to town, not asking her identity. When the conspirators arrive, they confront Renato; in the struggle, Amelia's veil drops. Renato assumes that Amelia and Riccardo have been involved in an adulterous love affair. He asks the two leaders of the conspiracy, Samuel and Tom, to meet him the next day.

=== Act 3 ===
Scene 1: Renato's house

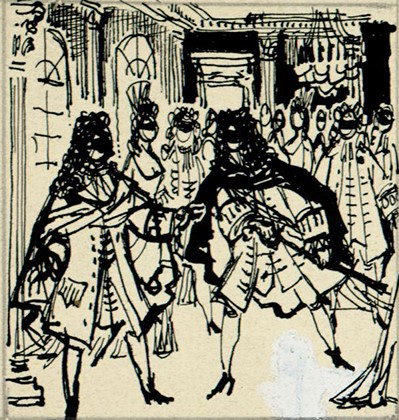
Undated design, depicting the final act for a libretto cover by Peter Hoffer

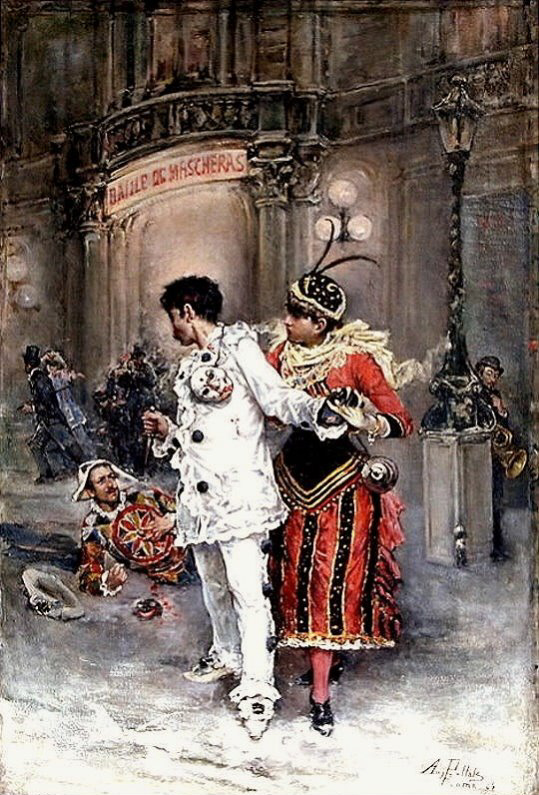
Death of Gustavo, act 3, sc. 2, by August Pollak

Renato has resolved to kill Amelia for the dishonor she has brought on him. She protests her innocence and begs to see her son one last time. (Aria: Morrò, ma prima in grazia / "I will die, but first, a kindness"). Renato relents, and declares that it is Riccardo, not Amelia, who deserves to die (Aria: Eri tu che macchiavi quell'anima / "You were the one who stained her soul").

Samuel (Count Ribbing) and Tom (Count Horn) arrive, and Renato asks to join their plot, pledging the life of his son as proof of his sincerity. They agree to draw lots to decide who will kill Riccardo. Amelia is forced to draw the winning name – Renato.

Oscar, the page, arrives with invitations to the masked ball; Samuel, Tom and Renato agree that this is where the assassination will take place.

Scene 2: The ball

Riccardo, torn between love and duty, has resolved to renounce his love for Amelia and send her and Renato back to England (Aria: Ma se m'è forza perderti / "But if I am forced to lose her").

At the ball, Renato tries to learn from Oscar what costume Riccardo is wearing. Oscar at first refuses to tell (Aria: Saper vorreste / "You want to know"), but finally answers: a black cloak and a red ribbon. Riccardo manages to identify Amelia and tells her of the decision he has made. As they say goodbye, Renato stabs Riccardo. The wounded Riccardo discloses that though he loved Amelia, she never broke her marriage vows. He pardons all the conspirators, bidding farewell to his friends and his country as he dies.

== Music ==
The prelude to the piece is composed of themes from the opening scene of the opera, with dramatic contrast between the music of Riccardo's devoted courtiers and the dark mutterings of those who hate him. This is followed by a transition to a love theme, the melody of Riccardo's first aria La rivedrà nell'estasi.

Influence of French opera is felt in the first scene, both in the vocal writing for Oscar the page-boy, sprinkled with coloratura effects, and in the closing ensemble in which Riccardo invites everyone to visit the witch's den in disguise. The music of this ensemble combines French-style elan and a sense of joie de vivre with continued low grumblings from those plotting Riccardo's assassination.

The second scene of the first act is preceded by a dramatic orchestral prelude, with dark instrumental colourings. Riccardo's light-hearted character is developed in the aria he sings in the disguise of a fisherman Di' tu se fedele, with the characteristics of a barcarolle. Ulrica's prophecy of Riccardo's assassination sets off a quintet with chorus in which Riccardo laughingly rejects the warning as nonsense, the conspirators express their dismay at having seemingly been found out, Ulrica insists that her prophecy is no joke and Oscar has the highest vocal line expressing his grief at the thought of Riccardo's murder. The act ends with a patriotic anthem like theme for the chorus juxtaposed with different vocal lines for the principals.

The second act begins with a stormy orchestral introduction. The grand scene for the soprano which follows is multi-sectioned with a slow cantilena accompanied by solo cor anglais, then a dramatic and quick middle section as Amelia is terrified by an apparition, and a slower anguished prayer with a final cadenza calling for an exceptional range from high to low. The following love duet is also multi-sectioned, building to a rapturous climax. A quartet with chorus closes the act, with radically different emotions once again being conveyed simultaneously in a single piece of music – the sardonic, mocking laughter of the conspirators, the anguish of Amelia and the implacable hatred and desire for revenge of her husband.

Act 3, scene 1, is notable for Amelia's mournful aria with cello obbligato Morrò, ma prima in grazia and for the celebrated baritone aria Eri tu, which begins in a fast minor key and ends in a slow major key, reversing the usual order of Italian operatic arias at this time, which had the slow section first. The conspirators return accompanied by the same contrapuntal theme which depicted them in the prelude and accompanied their appearance in the previous scene. With the entrance of Oscar, the music again acquires something of the spirit of French opéra comique, closing with a quintet in which Oscar's glittery and cheerful vocal line is underpinned by the music expressing Amelia's fears and the conspirators' thirst for vengeance.

The music of the aria for Riccardo that opens the final scene delineates the character's evolution from a selfish and light-hearted pleasure seeker to a serious man who will sacrifice his own happiness in order to do what he now recognises as the right thing. An offstage banda is heard playing dance music as the scene switches to the ball. Once again Oscar's music introduces the spirit of French opera-comique with his sparkling song Saper vorreste. A string ensemble onstage plays dance music as Riccardo and Amelia bid farewell in a duet, which is interrupted by Renato's stabbing of Riccardo. The musicians, unaware of what has happened, continue to play their music for some bars after this event. An ensemble with harp develops as Riccardo forgives his murderer and the opera ends with an exclamation of horror from all.

The music of the piece is often praised for its variety, its vivid and dramatic combinations of varying emotions into one piece of music as in the ensembles in the first and second acts, and its blending of the conventions of Italian serious opera with the spirit of French opera comique.

== Instrumentation ==
The opera is scored for flute, piccolo, two oboes, cor anglais, two clarinets, two bassoons, four horns, two trumpets, three trombones, cimbasso, timpani, cymbals, bass drum, harp and strings, together with offstage wind band, offstage bell and small onstage string orchestra (four to six first violins, two second violins, two violas, two cellos and two double basses).

== Cultural references ==
The opera plays a prominent part in the plot of the 1975 film The Adventure of Sherlock Holmes' Smarter Brother.

A rehearsal of act 3, scene 2, including the stabbing of Riccardo, is featured in the closing scene of Bernardo Bertolucci's 1979 film La Luna.

It also confused Leslie Titmuss in John Mortimer's novel Titmuss Regained; when a friend said that she was going to see Un ballo in maschera at Covent Garden, he replied "never been one for dancing".
