= Löwenströmska lasarettet =

- Location within Stockholm Location within Sweden Location within European Union
- Coordinates: 59°33′N 17°55′E
- Country: Sweden
- Province: Uppland
- County: Stockholm County
- Municipality: Upplands Väsby Municipality

Area
  - Total: 0.76 km^{2} (0.29 sq mi)

Population (31 December 2020)
  - Total: 581
  - Density: 760/km^{2} (2,000/sq mi)
- Time zone: UTC+1 (CET)
  - Summer (DST): UTC+2 (CEST)

Löwenströmska lasarettet is a locality situated in Upplands Väsby Municipality, Stockholm County, Sweden.

It takes its name from a hospital that was founded by the brother of Jacob Johan Anckarström, the murderer of king Gustav III of Sweden. His brother, Gustaf Adolf Anckarström, changed his surname to Löwenström and founded the hospital as an act of penance.

The original hospital was built in 1809–1811 and was in use until 1993. A number of other buildings were added over the years, including a sanatorium and a psychiatric hospital. A new building from the 1960s took over most of the functions of the hospital once it opened. The old buildings are now disused.

== Gallery ==
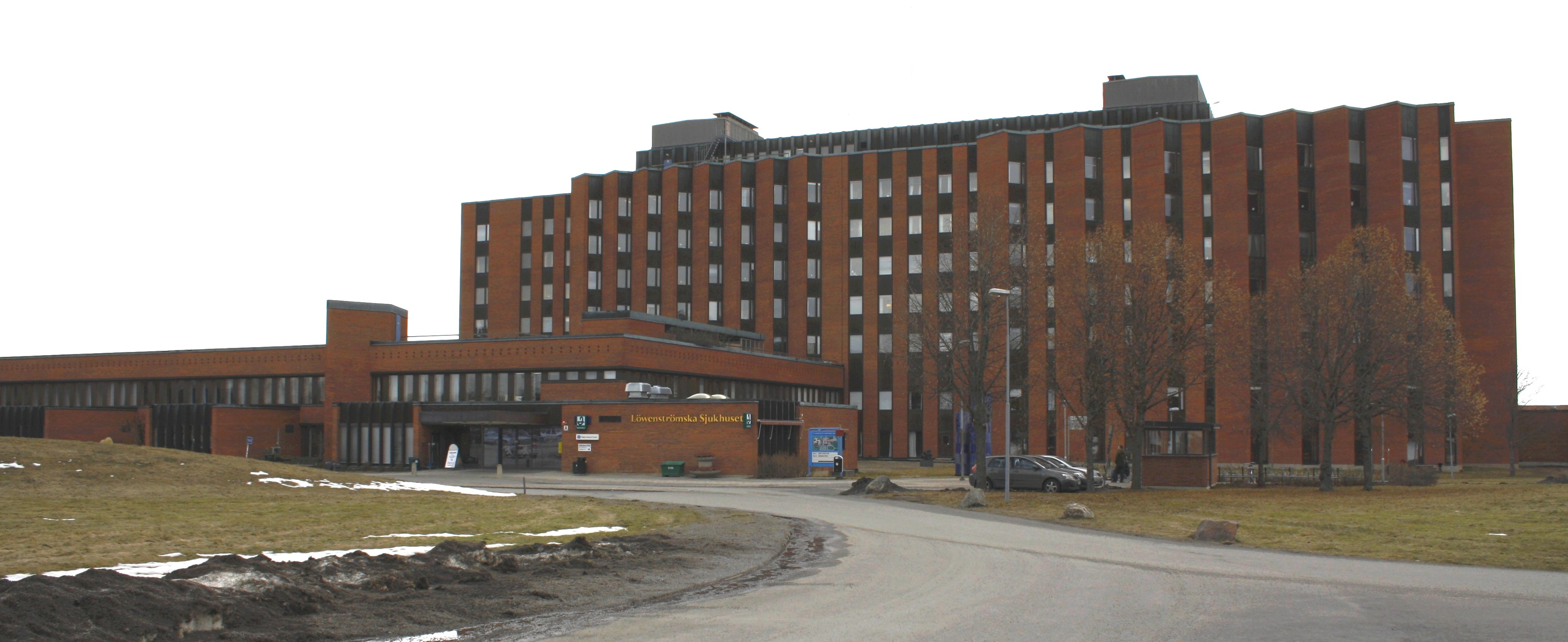
The new hospital

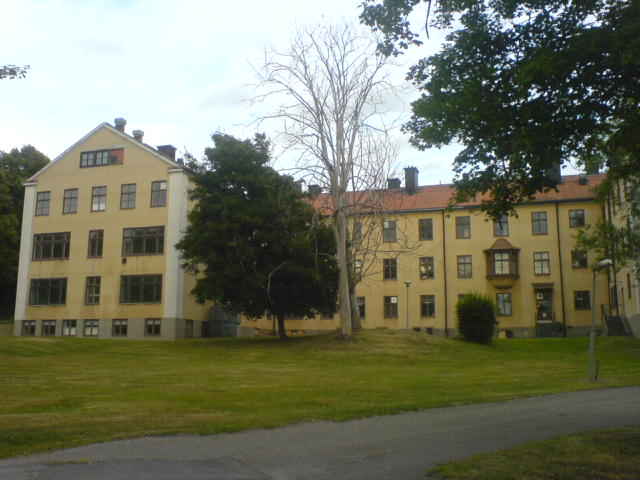
The old hospital

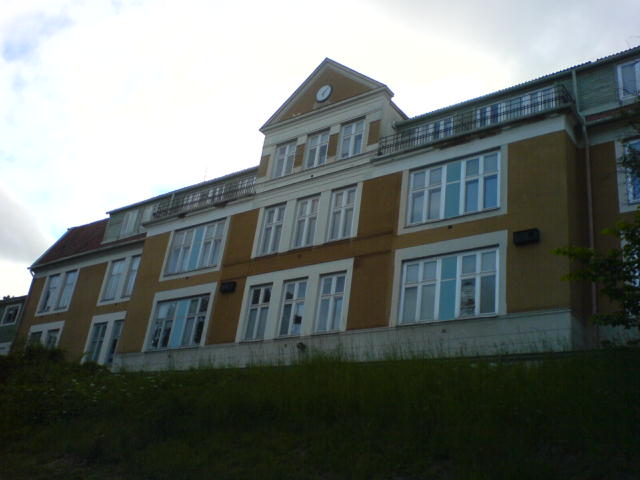
The old sanatorium

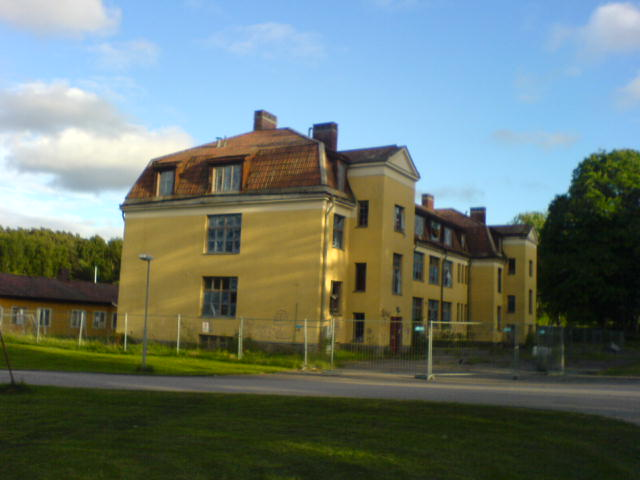
The old psychiatric hospital
