= Jacob Johan Anckarström =

Assassin of Swedish King Gustav III

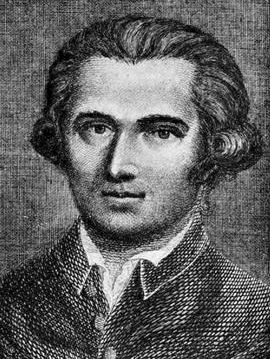
- Anckarström, c. 1792
- Born: 11 May 1762
- Died: 27 April 1792 (aged 29); Stockholm, Sweden
- Occupation: Military captain
- Status: Executed
- Conviction: Murder
- Penalty: Death

Jacob Johan Anckarström (11 May 1762 – 27 April 1792) was a Swedish military officer who is known as the assassin of King Gustav III of Sweden. He was convicted and executed for regicide.

== Life ==
He was the son of Jacob Johan Anckarström the Elder and Hedvig Ulrika Drufva. He married Gustaviana Elisabet Löwen (1764-1844) in 1783, and had two daughters and two sons: Gustafva Eleonora Löwenström (1785-1860), Carolina Lovisa, Johan Jacob and Carl David.

Anckarström served as a page at court and then as a captain in King Gustav III's regiment between 1778 and 1783. During travels to Gotland, he was accused of slandering the king and fled to Stockholm, where he spent the winter; he was subsequently arrested, brought back, and tried in Gotland. Although he was acquitted due to lack of evidence, he later maintained in his confession that this incident sparked his fire of hatred towards the king, fuelled by the contemporary revolutionary movement in Europe.

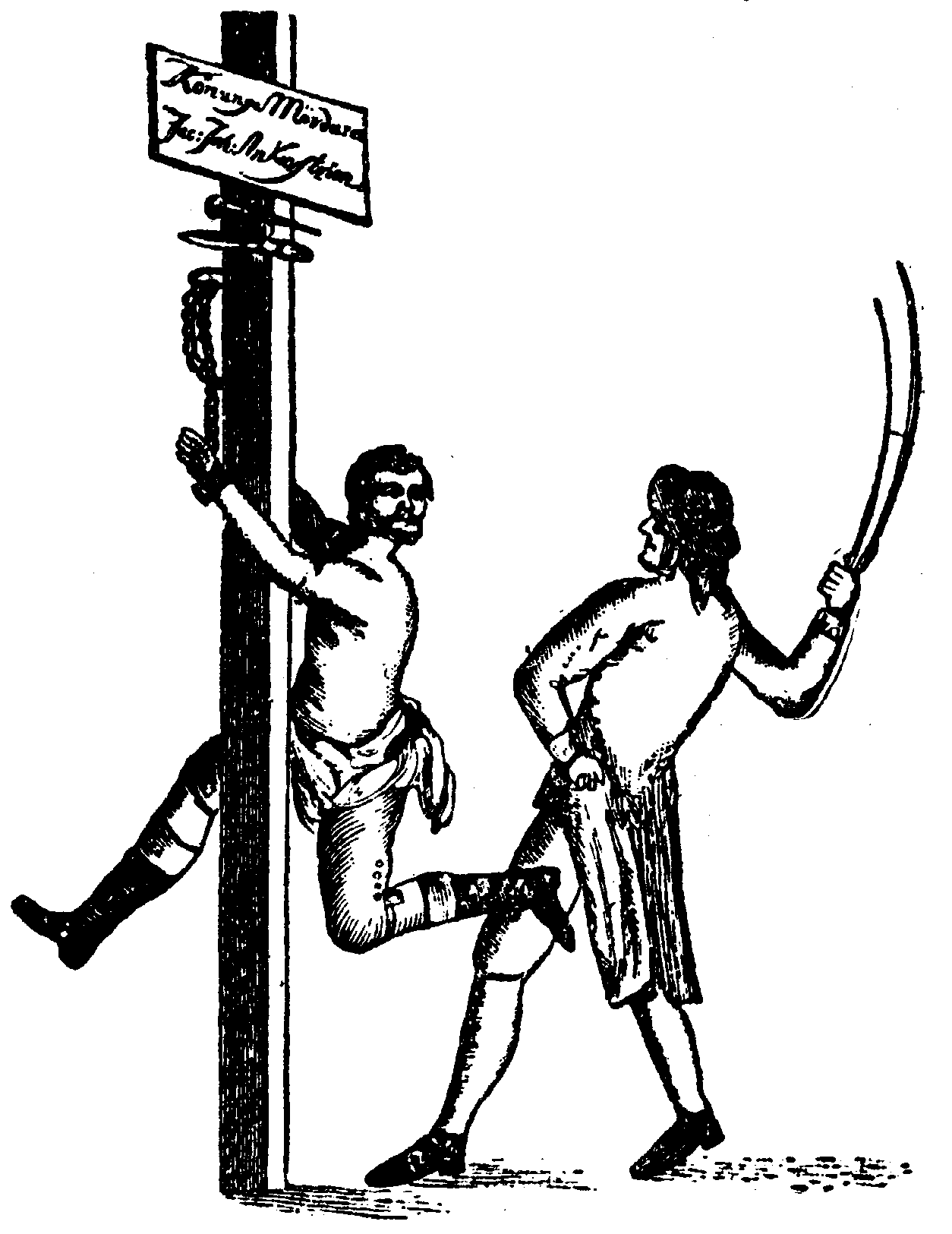
Drawing of Anckarström being flogged

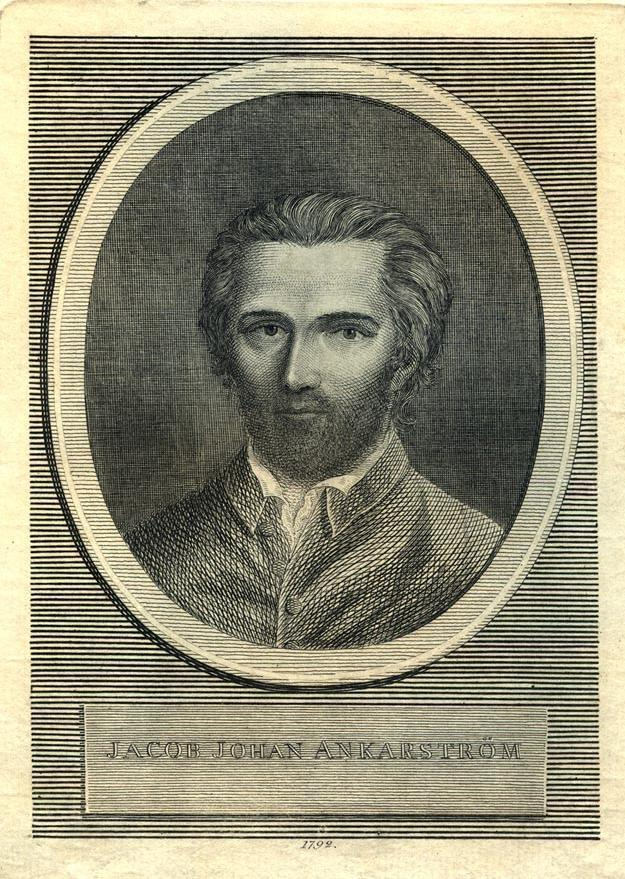

Beginning in 1788 the Swedish nobles were starting to become violently opposed to the king, who, through the aid of the other estates in Parliament, had wrested most of their power from them and was now ruling the nation as an absolute ruler. This dislike was increased by a war against Russia and his implementation of the Union and Security Act of 1789 which stripped the nobles of nearly all of their power and privileges, as well as by the king's desire to interfere in favour of Louis XVI in the ongoing French Revolution. Anckarström, a man of strong passions and known to have a violent temper, decided the only path forward was the assassination of the king and communicated his intention to other disaffected nobles, including the Counts Claes Horn and Adolf Ribbing.

An early attempt to kill the king at a masquerade ball ended in failure.

=== The murder ===
On 16 March 1792, Gustav III had returned to Stockholm, after spending the day at Haga Palace outside the city, to dine and visit a masquerade ball at the Royal Opera. During dinner, the king received an anonymous letter (written by the colonel of the Life Guards, Carl Pontus Lilliehorn) that contained a threat to his life, but as the king had received numerous threatening letters in the past, he chose to ignore the warning.

After dining, the king with Baron Hans Henrik von Essen at his right arm went around the theatre once and then into the foyer where they met Captain Carl Fredrik Pollet. The king, von Essen and Pollet continued through a corridor towards the stage where several dancers and masked men filled the space. Due to the crowd, Pollet receded behind the king, who then leaned back to talk to Pollet.

Anckarström stood at the entrance to the corridor and edged himself behind the king, took out a pistol from his left inner pocket and either he or Count Ribbing, who was next to him, pulled the trigger. Because of the king leaning back at that exact moment the shot went in at an angle left of the third lumbar vertebrae towards the left hip region. The shot consisted of two bullets, furniture tacks and bits of lead clippings; Anckarström later confessed that the composition of the shot was intended to be as lethal as possible.

The king twitched and said “aee” without falling. Anckarström then lost courage; he had thought that the king would fall directly. Bewildered, Anckarström dropped the pistol and knife on the floor, took a few steps and shouted fire. He quickly went towards the entrance, but the guards had already closed the doors. Despondent, he hid his second pistol and mixed in with the crowd. His intention had been to shoot himself with the second pistol. Witnesses told the court that Anckarström had been agitated and asked if the king was badly wounded. All guests at the masquerade were forced to give their names before leaving.

In the 19th Century the history of the assassination was embellished upon, embellishments that still are taken as facts today. Most notably is the tale of how one of the conspirators (often cited as Claes Fredrik Horn) taps the king on the shoulder and saying “bonsoir, beau masque” (Good evening, beautiful masque) to point out Anckarström's target. The other embellishment would be that the king was shot at a certain point in a counter dance, “Plaisir de Grönsö”. The conductor, so the legend goes, marked the sound of the shot in his notes and the music stopped. But the court records show that few people noticed the shot and the music continued playing for some time afterwards.

Anckarström's pistols, legend aside, were brought to several gunsmiths the next morning and one who had repaired them for Anckarström recognized them and identified him as their owner. Anckarström was arrested the same morning and immediately confessed to the murder, although he denied a conspiracy until he was informed that Horn and Ribbing had been arrested and confessed in full.

Anckarström was jailed in a prison not far from the Royal Palace in Stockholm. Today the former prison is an underground restaurant named after the viceroy Sten Sture.

Curiously, the murder had been predicted to the king four years earlier, when he paid an anonymous visit to the celebrated medium of the Gustavian era, Ulrica Arfvidsson. She was often employed by his brother, Duke Charles, and was said to have a large net of informers all over town; she was never suspected to be involved, but she was questioned about the murder. In 1791, Charlotta Roos also predicted misfortune to King Gustav III, something he reportedly referred to on his death bed after the assassination.

=== Execution ===
Gustav III died of his wounds on 29 March and on 16 April, Anckarström was sentenced to be cast in irons for three days and publicly flogged. In addition, his right hand was cut off, his head removed, and his corpse quartered. The execution took place on 27 April 1792. Anckarström endured his sufferings with the greatest fortitude, and seemed to rejoice in having rid his country of a tyrant. His principal accomplices Ribbing and Horn were stripped of titles and estates and expelled from the country.

=== Aftermath ===
In the same year, the Anckarström family changed its surname to Löwenström and donated funds for a hospital as a gift of appeasement. This resulted in the Löwenström Hospital, or Löwenströmska lasarettet in Upplands Väsby north of Stockholm. Living descendants of Anckarström include Ulf Adelsohn, and solo sailor Sven Yrvind.

== Operas ==
Anckarström is a character in Daniel Auber's opera Gustave III and Giuseppe Verdi's Un ballo in maschera (A Masked Ball). In both operas, his motivation is changed to jealousy over his wife Amelia, whom Gustav is portrayed as being in love with. Before he switches allegiances he is portrayed as being Gustav's close friend, and Gustav pardons him with his last breath. In the censored version of the Verdi libretto, set in Colonial-era Boston, he is called Renato (Rene).
