= Nils Henric Liljensparre =

Swedish police officer

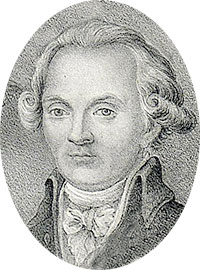
Nils Henric Liljensparre

Nils Henric Aschan Liljensparre, born Sivers (22 July 1738, Norrköping - 5 January 1814, Stockholm), was a Swedish police officer. He is most known for conducting the investigation of the regicide of king Gustav III of Sweden in 1792.

Liljensparre studied law at Uppsala University and served in Svea hovrätt from 1762. He became an official at the royal council in 1765, secretary in 1772, and the head of the Stockholm police in 1776. Liljensparre is regarded as a devoted and effective police. He did, however, adjust himself to the demands of the crown even in cases when they bent the laws. This made him unpopular, but a favorite of the monarch, who ennobled him under the name Liljensparre in 1786. He organised a network of police agents in Stockholm.

In 1792, he was in charge of the investigation of the regicide of King Gustav III of Sweden. He succeeded in identifying the culprit, but his investigation about the plots against the late monarch was not popular with the new regent, Duke Charles. In an attempt to ingratiate himself with the new regent, he is believed to have had rumors spread which contributed to the fall of Gustaf Mauritz Armfelt. In 1793, he was deposed from his position, due to his handling of the Ebel Riot, and send to Swedish Pomerania to organize the police force there. In 1799, he was given the responsibility of the Stockholm customs, where he was described as effective but despotic. He retired in 1811.

== Sources ==
- Svenskt biografiskt lexikon (artikel av Gardar Sahlberg), hämtad 2013-07-10
