= Julian Budden =

Julian Medforth Budden OBE FBA (9 April 1924 in Hoylake, Wirral – 28 February 2007 in Florence, Italy) was a British opera scholar, radio producer and broadcaster. He is particularly known for his three volumes on the operas of Giuseppe Verdi (published in 1973, 1978, and 1981), a single-volume biography in 1982 and a single-volume work on Giacomo Puccini and his operas in 2002. He is also the author of numerous entries in the Grove Dictionary of Music and Musicians.

== Personal life ==
His parents were the then professor of architecture at Liverpool University, Lionel Budden, and a poet, writer and journalist Maud, (née Fraser) who from 1938 until 1964 provided the rhymes for the strip Curly Wee and Gussie Goose, which was syndicated in newspapers throughout the world. Neither of his parents was especially musical and were not interested in what little opera was available locally. His operatic awakening occurred at school when a touring company with piano accompaniment and spoken recitatives performed The Marriage of Figaro.

He attended Stowe School and read Classics at Queen's College Oxford. The war interrupted his studies; he worked in the Friends' Ambulance Unit from 1943 to 1946, serving in Austria and Italy. He completed his BA in 1948 and then studied piano (with Thornton Lofthouse) and bassoon (with Archie Camden) at the Royal College of Music.

== Career ==
From 1951 until 1983, Budden worked for the BBC, progressing from junior posts to become a producer, then Chief Producer of Opera (1970–76) and External Services Music Organizer (1976–83). This time saw many little-known works produced and important revivals, including the original versions of Macbeth, La forza del destino, Simon Boccanegra, and the full French version of Don Carlos. He also produced programmes for others and was meticulous in checking scripts and encouraging contributions.

Concurrently, Budden pursued a career as a writer, starting with the BBC publication The Listener. Then came his major study of Verdi, built on the foundation of "patient archival research, practical musicianship, a sense of history, and wide cultural sympathies", with every opera covered by a detailed discussion of the literary background, compositional process, and the music as part of the drama. The books were "free from obscure technical analysis or deconstructionist jargon". His writing style was "generous to past scholars and generous to his readers. His prose was full of wit and relaxed communication". Budden was considered a key figure in securing the reputation of Verdi during the second half of the twentieth century.

After leaving the BBC, he was based in both London and Florence (where he spoke fluent Italian), where he was a regular correspondent for Opera magazine and was a presence at the Istituto Nazionale di Studi Verdiani in Parma. He was president of the Centro di Studi Giacomo Puccini in Lucca until his death.

He was made a Fellow of the British Academy in 1987 and appointed an OBE for services to opera in 1991.

== Publications ==
- The Operas of Verdi, Volume 1 (3rd edition), New York: Oxford University Press, 1983 ISBN 0-19-816261-8
- The Operas of Verdi, Volume 2 (3rd edition), New York: Oxford University Press, 1983 ISBN 0-19-816262-6
- The Operas of Verdi, Volume 3 (3rd edition), New York: Oxford University Press, 1983 ISBN 0-19-816263-4
- The New Grove Masters of Italian Opera (with others), New York, W.W. Norton, 1981 ISBN 0-333-35383-8
- Verdi (Master Musicians Series), New York, Weidenfeld & Nicolson, 1986 ISBN 0-460-02472-8; Oxford: Oxford University Press, 1992 ISBN 0-460-86111-5
- Encounters with Verdi (with Marcello Conati and Richard Stokes), Cornell University Press, 1997 ISBN 0-8014-9430-3
- Puccini: His Life and Works, New York: Oxford University Press, 2002. (4 Editions) ISBN 0-19-816468-8
