= Gustave III (Auber) =

Opera by Daniel Auber

- Grand opera by Daniel Auber
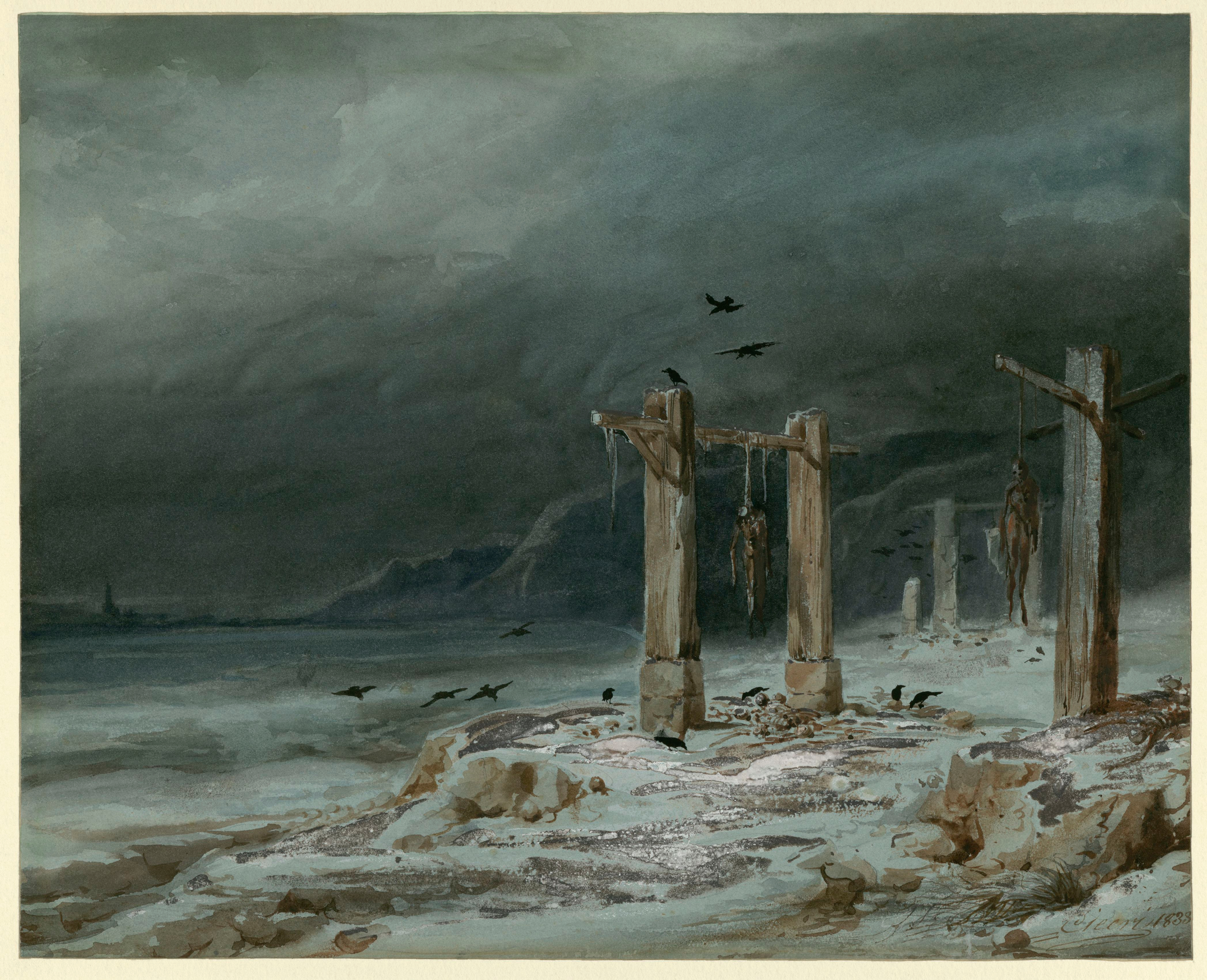
- Act III set design by Pierre-Luc-Charles Cicéri
- Librettist: Eugène Scribe
- Language: French
- Premiere: 27 February 1833; Salle Le Peletier, Paris

Gustave III, ou Le bal masqué (Gustavus III, or The Masked Ball) is an opéra historique or grand opera in five acts by Daniel Auber, with a libretto by Eugène Scribe.

== History ==
Auber wrote Gustave III, ou Le bal masqué as a grand opera in five acts to a libretto by Eugène Scribe, about some aspects of the real-life assassination of Gustav III, King of Sweden. The major aspects of the plot can be found in Giuseppe Verdi's planned opera, Gustavo III, which was never performed as written, but whose major elements were incorporated into a revised version of the story in the opera which eventually became Un ballo in maschera.

=== Performance history ===
The opera received its first performance at the Salle Le Peletier of the Paris Opéra on 27 February 1833, with costumes designed by Eugène Lami and Paul Lormier, and sets by Léon Feuchère (act 1 and act 5, scene 2), Jules Diéterle (act 2), Alfred (act 3), Pierre-Luc-Charles Ciceri (act 4), René-Humanité Filastre and Charles-Antoine Cambon (act 5, scene 1). The opera was a major success for the composer, with 168 performances until 1853.

Ellen Creathorne Clayton has translated French critic Jules Janin's description of the last act, which was often presented separately from the opera, as follows:

"I believe ... that never, even at the Opéra, was seen a spectacle more grand, more rich, more curious, more magnificent, that the fifth act of Gustave. It is a fairlyland of beautiful women, of gauze, of velvet, of grotesqueness, of elegance, of good taste and of bad taste, of details, of learned researches, of esprit, of madness and of whimsicality – of every thing in a word, which is suggestive of the eighteenth century. When the beautiful curtain is raised, you find yourself in an immense ballroom." The stage of the Grand Opéra, the largest in Paris, is admirably adapted for masked balls, and the side-scenes being removed, the stage was surrounded a salon, the decorations of which corresponded with those of the boxes. "This salle de bal is overlooked by boxes, these boxes are filled with masks, who play the part of spectators. At their feet, constantly moving, is the circling crowd, disguised in every imaginable costume, and dominoes of every conceivable hue. Harlequins of all fashions, clowns, peddlers, what shall I say? One presents the appearance of a tub, another of a guitar; his neighbor is disguised en botte d'asperges; that one is a mirror, this a fish; there is a bird, here is a time-piece – you can hardly imagine the infinite confusion. Peasants, marquises, princes, monks, I know not what, mingle in one rainbow-hued crowd. It is impossible to describe this endless madness, this whirl, this bizarrerie, on which the rays of two thousand wax tapers, in their crustal lustres, pour an inundation of mellow light. I, who am so well accustomed to spectacles like this – I, who am, unfortunately, not easily disposed to be surprised – I am yet dazzled with this radiant scene."

== Roles ==
Roles, voice types, premiere cast
Role	Voice type	Premiere cast, 27 February 1833 (Conductor: – )
Gustave III, King of Sweden	tenor	Adolphe Nourrit
Ankastrom, his friend	bass	Nicolas-Prosper Levasseur
Amélie, Countess of Ankastrom, in love with Gustave	soprano	Cornélie Falcon
Oscar, the King's page	soprano	Julie Dorus-Gras
Arvedson, fortune teller	mezzo-soprano	Louise-Zulmé Dabadie-Leroux
Ribbing (or "Warting"), conspirator	tenor	Alexis Dupont
Dehorn, conspirator	baritone	Henri-Bernard Dabadie
A chamberlain	tenor	Hyacinthe Trévaux
Armfelt, Minister of Justice	bass	Ferdinand Prévost
Général Kaulbart, Minister of War	bass	Pierre-François Wartel
Christian	tenor	Jean-Étienne-Auguste Massol
A servant of Ankastrom	singer	François-Alphonse Hens
Roslin, painter	silent	Ferdinand
Sergell, sculptor	silent	Henri
Chorus: courtiers, deputies of state, military officers in the service of the King, royal guards, sailors, soldiers, people

== Synopsis ==
Place: Stockholm
Time: 15 and 16 March 1792

The opera concerns some aspects of the real-life assassination of Gustav III, King of Sweden.

== Recordings ==
- Gustave III: Laurence Dale, Rima Tawil, Christian Treguier, French Lyrique Orchestra; Intermezzo Vocal Ensemble, conducted by Michel Swierczewski (Arion, 1993)
- The overture and ballet music from Gustave III appears at the end of the second disc of Richard Bonynge's recording of Auber's Le domino noir.
