= Gustavo III (Verdi) =

Opera by Giuseppe Verdi

- Opera by Giuseppe Verdi
- Librettist: Antonio Somma
- Language: Italian
- Based on: Gustav III of Sweden
- Premiere: 2002; Gothenburg Opera

Gustavo III is an opera by Giuseppe Verdi to a libretto begun in early 1857 by the Italian playwright Antonio Somma. Never performed as written, the libretto was later revised (or proposed to be revised) several times under two additional names – Una vendetta in dominò and Adelia degli Adimari – during which the setting was changed to vastly different locations. Eventually, it was agreed that it could be called Un ballo in maschera, the name by which it is known today, but Verdi was forced to accept that the location of the story would have to be Colonial Boston. This setting became the "standard" one until the mid-20th Century. Most productions today locate the action in Sweden.

However, a "hypothetical reconstruction" of Gustavo III under its original name was performed by the Gothenburg Opera in Sweden during the 2002/03 season.

== Composition history ==
In early 1856 Vincenzo Torelli, secretary to the Teatro San Carlo's management approached Verdi with a contract offer, the proposed opera being Re Lear, an opera based on Shakespeare's King Lear. It was known to be a subject dear to the composer, but this libretto, for which Somma and Verdi had worked for some time, raised concerns for Verdi, not the least of which was finding a suitable cast in Naples, given the practice of a company engaging a group of singers for an entire season and giving them the major roles to sing in all productions, thus forcing a composer to take into account their strengths and weaknesses in the roles he was creating.

Even though it proved to be impracticable to continue with Re Lear, Verdi signed a contract in February 1857 for performances during the 1857/58 carnival season, but, as the year progressed and with time running out, he had misgivings and failed to meet commitments regarding Lear. Finally, in a letter which he wrote to Torelli in September 1857, Verdi confessed that he had "looked through an infinite number of plays.....but not one of them will do for me..." but he then described an existing libretto which interested him, one which was written by the French playwright and librettist Eugene Scribe for Daniel Auber's very successful 1833 opera, Gustave III, ou Le bal masqué:

"At present I'm scaling down a French drama, Gustavo III di Svezia (Note: Verdi's translation of the French title), libretto by Scribe, performed at the Opéra twenty years ago. It's vast and grandiose; it's beautiful....It is now too late to find other subjects."

Verdi turned to the historical subject of King Gustav III of Sweden, who was shot while attending a masked ball in Stockholm in 1792 and died thirteen days later. Anckarström, his assassin, was executed. Although noting it as "a French drama", Verdi was referring to Scribe's libretto, and this became the source of Somma's libretto.

In his version, Scribe had retained the names of some of the historical figures involved including Gustave, Anckarström (the king's secretary and his best friend), Ulrica Arfvidsson (the fortune teller), and conspirators Ribbing and Horn; the conspiracy itself; and the killing at the masked ball. As noted by Budden, Scribe invented much of the rest of the action, including Gustav's romance with the fictional Amélie (Anckarström's wife) and he added characters and situations such as the page boy, Oscar. "It was a simple case of 'cherchez la femme'" says Budden, who sees Scribe using the romance as the reason for the murder (rather than the purely political motive behind the actual event) and he describes the plot of Scribe's libretto as "cleverly constructed...in which irony follows irony. It abounds in striking situations and coups de théatre; it offers opportunities for a display of the most intense and varied emotions; and it is full of suspense."

=== Initial preparation of the Gustavo III libretto ===
Throughout the autumn of 1857 correspondence between librettist and composer flowed regularly, and on 19 October, Verdi sent a synopsis to Torelli. He immediately received a reply warning him that "a change of locale would be necessary at the very least and the poet had better be advised of this." While Verdi did not necessarily see a problem in changing location, he did lament the loss of other things: "what a pity to have to give up the pomp of a court like that of Gustavo III. Then too it will be difficult to find another monarch on the lines of that Gustavo. Poor poets, poor composers"

When Somma's verses (to which Verdi had contributed a significant amount, including an initial prose outline) were sent to the composer by late November 1857, the outline of the opera was complete, and Verdi began to create musical sketches of significant scenes. At the same time, word came of the seven requirements imposed by the Naples censorship. These included that (i) "The King must become a Duke"; (ii) "the action must be transferred to a pre-Christian age"; (iii) the conspirators must not hate the Duke because they wanted to take power; and (iv) "no firearms".

Somma had several suggestions, including a possible new title, Il duca Ermanno with a 12th Century setting, which Verdi rejected; but he did accept the proposed change to Pomerania. The pair spent Christmas of 1857 together working on changes. However, Somma insisted that his name be changed on the libretto to "Tommaso Anoni".

=== Gustavo III becomes Una vendetta in domino ===
Discussions with the censors eventually resulted in the location being changed to Stettin in Pomerania in Northern Germany, the main character becoming a Duke, and the title becoming Una vendetta in domino. A compromise seemed to have been reached. However, as has been noted, "Verdi did not begin preparing the skeleton score for Una vendetta before composer and versifier decided on the Pomeranian setting"

After an arduous journey, Verdi arrived in Naples in January 1858. He brought with him the skeleton score and this was handed over to Torelli. With the major problems seeming to have been resolved and rehearsals of Un vendetta about to begin, an attempt to assassinate Emperor Napoleon III in Paris by three Italians led by Felice Orsini occurred on 14 January 1858.

After attempting to obtain agreement on the singers during his first ten days in Naples, Verdi finally discovered that the company's management had withheld the news that the censors had refused to approve the libretto some three months before. Now, with the latest news regarding the Emperor, the Naples Chief of Police had ruled the opera's text would have to be entirely re-written. Verdi regarded this as outrageous and, in his letter to Somma, he laid out his objections to their list of demands:

"1. Transform the hero into some great lord, so that all thought of a sovereign is eradicated.
2. Transform the wife into a sister.
3. Change the scene with the fortune-teller, and put it back into a time when people believed in such things.
4. No ballet.
5. The murder is to be behind the scenes.
6. Leave out completely the scene with the drawing of the name."

In between this correspondence with his librettist, Verdi hit upon an important musical point with Torelli regarding his feelings about the impossibility of changing the character of Gustavo. The composer says that to do so would make everything:

"false and uninteresting [so that] that quality of brilliance and chivalry, that aura of gaiety that pervaded the whole action and which made a fine contrast and was like a light in the darkness surrounding the tragic moments, has vanished."

If these kind of changes were to be made, Somma replied later, then he would insist that the title be changed and "another author be credited with the words" The opera would no longer be his.

When the manuscript of Una Vendetta was returned to him, Verdi found that it been renamed Adelia degli Adimari and now set in 14th Century Florence. Even worse, he noted that of Una Vendetta's 884 lines, 297 had been changed in Adelia. Although Torelli attempted to get the composer to compromise and meet with the censor on 20 February, Verdi dug in his heels and, in his reply to Torelli, refused to accept any changes: "...I cannot commit the monstrosities that were inflicted here (Naples) on Rigoletto ", referring to how that opera had been butchered by the censors when it was presented in his absence a few years before. Rejecting any involvement with Adelia, a lawsuit was then set in place by the theatre for breach of contract. In his countersuit, Verdi claimed damages and, in the document which he prepared called "Defense of Maestro Cavalier Giuseppe Verdi" and in which he gave instructions to his lawyer, he laid what he regarded as the absurdity of some of the requirements. These included the substitution of one word of the opening chorus' "Die!" for "He sleeps". In addition, it has been noted that he instructed a copyist to "place the two librettos (Vendetta and Adelia)in parallel columns"

In summary, Verdi rhetorically asks:

"What the management's drama has in common with mine:
The title? – No
The poet? – No
The period? – No
The place? – No
The characters? – No
The situations? – No!
The drawing of lots? – No!
The ball? – No!
A composer who respects his art and himself could not or would not dishonor himself by accepting as a subject for his music, written on quite a different basis, these absurdities....."

The countersuit was presented to the Commercial Court in Naples on 13 March, and Verdi's efforts were rewarded with the Court's ruling that there was merit to the case and its injunction for the parties to reach agreement. This allowed Verdi to leave Naples with his score in hand, but promising to return to Naples later in the year to stage at least one of his other operas.

=== Gustavo III is revived ===
However, while many of the negotiations noted above were proceeding, Verdi became determined to find another location for his opera. In March 1858, after contacting his friend, the sculptor Vincenzo Luccardi in Rome, and requesting information on the performances of a play Gustavo III currently being presented there, he proposed that Rome stage the work. Verdi sent the libretto of the opera under the name of Gustavo III, which at that point was identical to Una vendetta but with the original setting and names restored.

When Jacovacci, impresario of the Teatro Apollo (where Il trovatore had been presented successfully) received the libretto, his reaction was encouraging, but he warned the composer that there may be problems with the censor. Verdi was surprised: "In Rome they allow Gustavo III as a spoken play but won't allow a libretto on the same subject. Very strange!"

At first, Verdi wanted the libretto returned, but Jacovacci's persistence prevailed, and it was found that the censors did not insist on such dramatic changes as originally had been thought possible. However, the censors' prime demand was the requirement that Gustavo III be set elsewhere than in Europe. Verdi proposed Boston in the 17th century to Somma, alternatively "the Caucasus perhaps?" His letter began: "Arm yourself with courage and patience. Particularly with patience.....Remember that under present conditions our best plan is to present the opera in Rome.....".

Eventually, when the censors refused to allow a Duke, Somma came up with "Riccardo Conte di Varvich (Warwick)" and then refused to make other changes; that was acceptable to all. Once again, Somma refused to have his name appear on the libretto.

=== Gustavo III becomes Un ballo in maschera ===
By 11 September 1858, Verdi wrote to Somma accepting the revised changes in Gustavo III, but renamed it as Un ballo in maschera. Until his arrival in Rome in January 1859, Verdi was involved in completing and orchestrating the opera. Basing it as he did on the skeleton score of Una vendetta, Verdi transformed the setting and characters' names to fit the requirements. The score's text required modification to agree with Ballo and not Una vendetta, orchestration was completed, and musical changes and adjustments were made. Significant changes in the music occurred after 11 September and are also detailed by Gossett.

The first performance of the new opera was presented on 17 February 1859.

By about 1870, after Ballo had become successful and when Italian unification removed much of regional censorship, Verdi could probably have returned the opera to its original Swedish setting, but he never did so. Until the mid-20th Century, the "standard" location of Ballo remained in the United States.

Today, Ballo has become part of the standard repertory and is often performed.

== Performance history of Gustavo III ==
Gustavo III disappeared for close to one hundred and fifty years, but it again made an appearance with the publication of the critical edition of Un ballo in maschera and the subsequent "hypothetical reconstruction", based on the unorchestrated original and much of Una vendetta "grafted" onto Un ballo's score.

The complete history of Gustavo III has been outlined by musicologist Philip Gossett in his Divas and Scholars but, as noted by George Loomis, for the 25% of the score which is lost "Gossett and (Ilaria) Narici (who edited the critical edition) had to use an earlier sketched version at Sant'Agata that spans the entire opera (with some gaps) but consists largely of only the melodic line. Gossett says that the sketched draft nevertheless permits one conversant with Verdi's style to reconstruct the original with a reasonable degree of probability. And the opera's final version often supplies guidance in matters of harmony and orchestration."

Gustavo III was presented by the Gothenburg Opera in Gothenburg, Sweden during the 2002/03 season, 146 years after Verdi took his libretto for Gustavo III away from the Teatro San Carlo in Naples. Gustavo III was given at the San Carlo in January/February 2004.

== Roles ==
| Role | Voice type |
|---|---|
| Gustavo, King of Sweden | tenor |
| Amelia, wife of Anckarström, in love with Gustavo | soprano |
| Count Anckarström, husband of Amelia and Gustavo's secretary, best friend and confidant | baritone |
| Oscar, Gustavo's page | coloratura soprano |
| Madame Arvidson, a fortune-teller | contralto |
| A judge | tenor |
| Cristiano | bass |
| Amelia's servant | tenor |
| Count Ribbing | bass |
| Count Horn | bass |

== Recordings ==
| Year | Cast (Gustavo III, Anckarström, Amelia, Ulrica Arfvidsson, Oscar) | Conductor, Opera House and Orchestra | Label |
|---|---|---|---|
| 2002 | Thomas Lind, Krister St. Hill, Hillevi Martinpelto, Susanne Resmark, Carolina Sandgren | Maurizio Barbacini, Gothenburg Opera House Orchestra and Chorus (Recording of the original version given under the title Gustavo III with reconstructed score from drafts written by Verdi) | Audio CD: Dynamic; Cat: CDS 426/1-2 |
