= Re Lear =

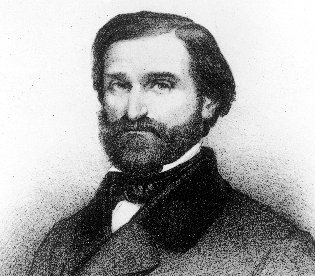
Verdi in the 1850s around the time of Rigoletto

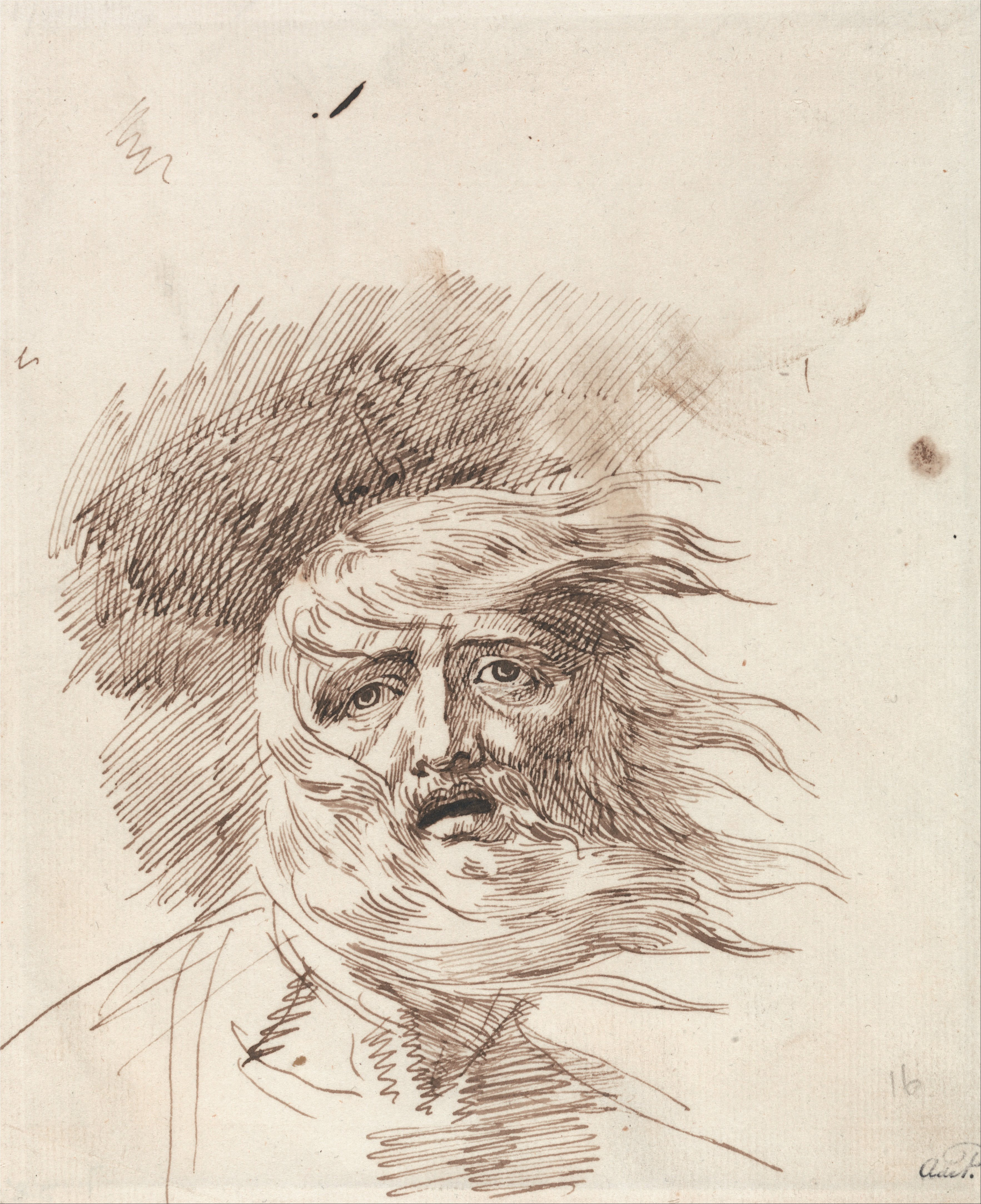
"Lear in the Storm"; George Romney, 19th century drawing, date unk.

Re Lear (Italian pronunciation: [ˌre lˈli(ːa)r]; King Lear) is an Italian operatic libretto in four acts written by Antonio Somma for the Italian opera composer Giuseppe Verdi. It was based on King Lear, "the Shakespeare play with which Verdi struggled for so many years, but without success".

The Re Lear project is widely considered illustrative of Verdi's complex and enduring fascination with Shakespeare. Verdi commissioned the libretto first from Salvadore Cammarano, who died in June 1852 before he could complete it. Then, three years later, while working with Antonio Somma on what was eventually to become Un ballo in maschera, he proposed that Somma read King Lear and he re-read the play himself, then sought Somma's reactions. Their extensive correspondence has been preserved; it thoroughly documents Verdi's oversight and detailed supervision, the result being two completed and still extant versions of the libretto prepared by Somma in 1853 and 1855.

However, while the idea of Re Lear remained with Verdi into the 1890s, no music for the opera was ever composed.

== Development of a libretto ==
=== Working with Cammarano ===
In a letter of 28 February 1850, Verdi outlined his thoughts to Cammarano:

At first sight, Lear is so tremendous, so intricate, that it would seem impossible to make an opera of it. However, after examining it closely, it seems to me that the difficulties, great as they are, are not insuperable. You know, we need not turn Lear into the sort of drama that has been customary up to now. We must treat it in a completely new way, without any regard for convention.

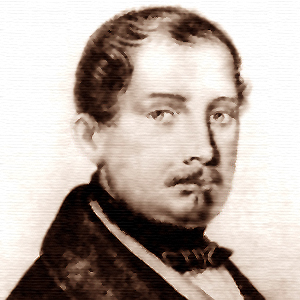
Salvadore Cammarano

Right from the beginning, Verdi had ideas as to how the play should be adapted. His 1850 letter lays out what he sees as certain strategies, including the relative importance of the characters. Specifically, he saw only five main ones: Lear, Cordelia, the brothers Edgar and Edmund, and, as the Fool who would be sung by a contralto. The "Secondary roles would be reduced to four: Regan, Goneril, Kent, and Gloucester. The others, would be very subordinate roles and the work would only 8 or 9 scenes (as compared to the play's 22). However, Verdi sent an outline of 11 scenes (the same as in I Lombardi, he notes.)

In his last letter to Cammarano, on 19 June 1852, Verdi wrote: "Cheer up, Cammarano, we have to make this Re Lear which will be our masterpiece."

After the librettist's death, the detailed sketch was handed over to Verdi; it still survives.

=== Working with Somma ===
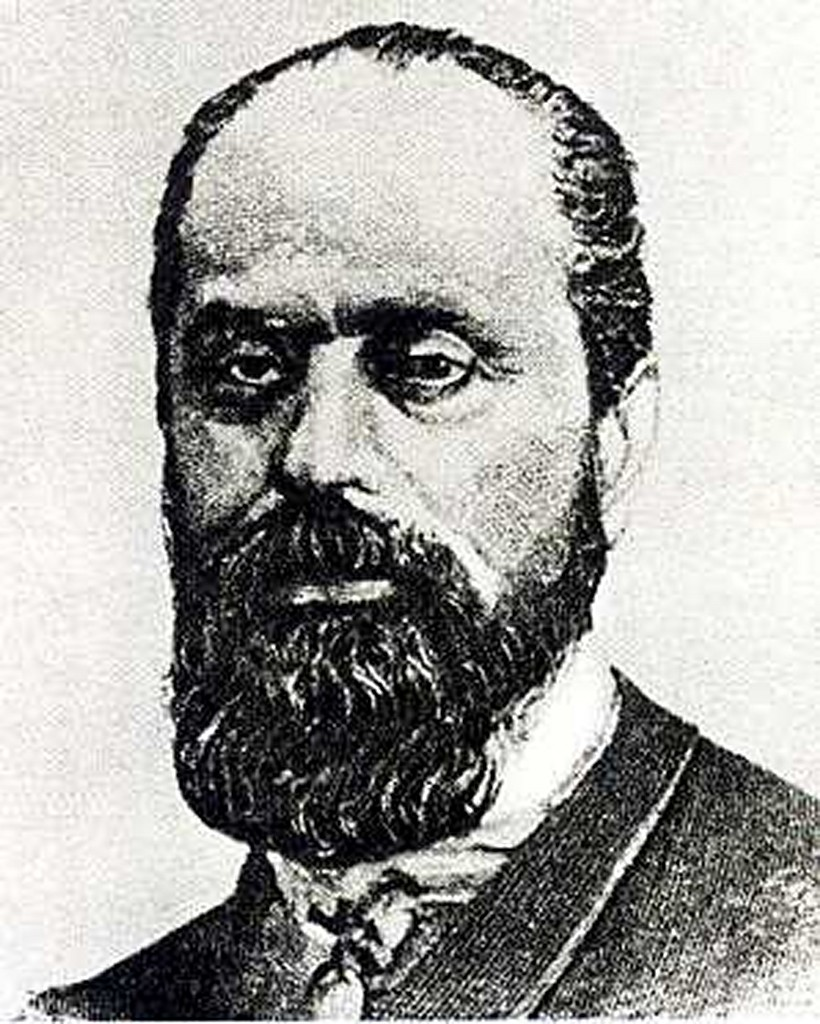
Antonio Somma

Following Cammarano's death, Antonio Somma, who was both a friend and a dramatist ("but also a neophyte in the libretto making trade") approached Verdi with ideas for a libretto. He was instrumental in anonymously writing the original libretto for Gustavo III, an opera which changed its name several times and which finally became Un ballo in maschera in 1859.

However, in his letter to Somma of 22 April 1853, Verdi laid out some of his reasons for disliking the subjects which Somma had proposed, noting his reservations about repeating subject areas which he had already tackled and observing that "I prefer Shakespeare to all dramatists, not excepting the Greeks". Accordingly, he asked the librettist to take a look at Shakespeare's King Lear, seeking his ideas.

In a further letter to Somma a month later (after he had re-read the play), Verdi detailed his concept of how the opera should be constructed.

As documented in their extensive correspondence and with Verdi's overall detailed supervision, two completed and still extant versions of the libretto were prepared, the first in 1853 followed by the second in 1855. Only in 1996 did music historian Leo Karl Gerhartz come across a brief paper in the Carrara-Verdi archives at Sant' Agata, Verdi's home near Busseto, and it was through the later support from that family (as well as the American National Endowment for the Humanities) that much more material including Somma's manuscript libretto became available on microfilm.

Many of the subsequent letters from the composer (those of 29 June, 30 August, and 9 September 1853 for example), in addition to others continuing into April 1856, constantly demonstrate Verdi's detailed oversight. Subsequent correspondence with Somma up to 1859 focuses primarily on the problems which Verdi was having with the censors on Un Ballo in Maschera.

But the Re Lear project kept haunting Verdi to the end of his life. In 1896, he offered his Lear material to Pietro Mascagni who asked "Maestro, why didn't you put it into music?". According to Mascagni, "softly and slowly he replied 'the scene in which King Lear finds himself on the heath scared me'".
