= Antonio Somma =

Italian playwright (1809–1864)

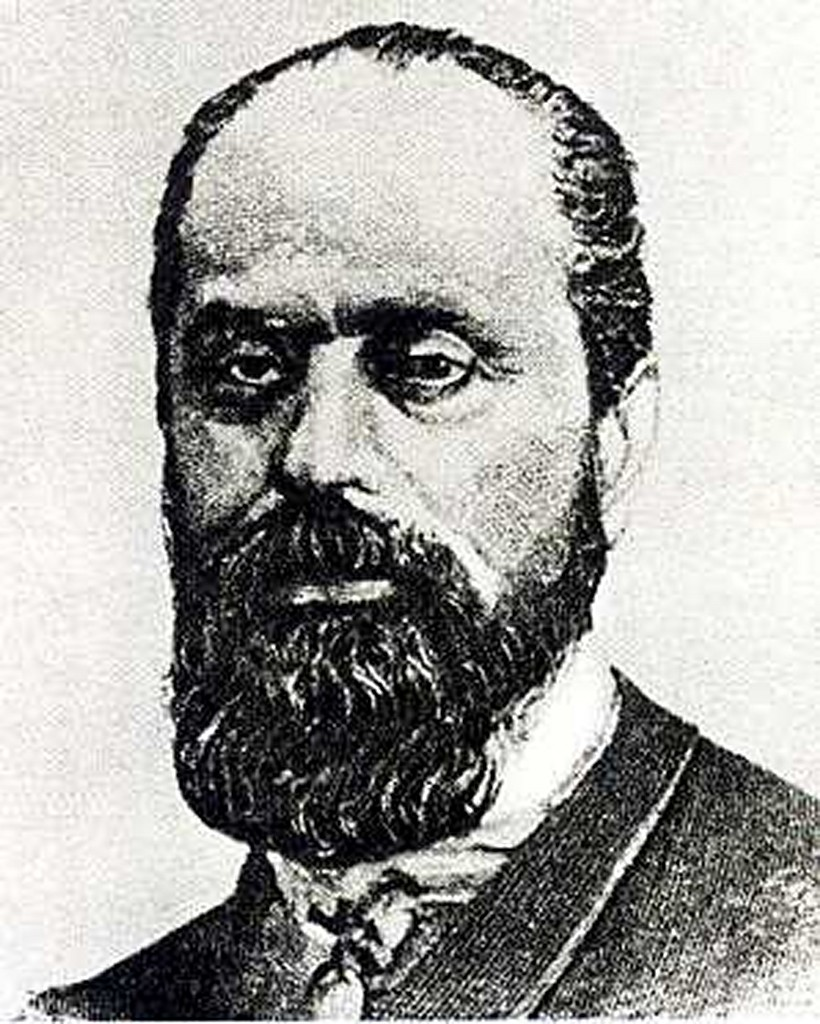
Antonio Somma

Antonio Somma (28 August 1809, Udine – 8 August 1864, Venice) was an Italian playwright who is most well known for writing the libretto of an opera which ultimately became Giuseppe Verdi's Un ballo in maschera in 1859. While a student, his tragedy, Parisina, gave him quite a success.

Initially, his contact with Verdi came about when the composer was seeking to continue work on his proposed Re Lear, an adaptation of the Shakespeare play, King Lear, for the opera stage which had begun under his long-time collaborator Salvadore Cammarano who had died. Under Verdi's supervision, Somma wrote the libretto for Re Lear, a project that Verdi never realised musically although extensive work was done and a full libretto completed to the point where Verdi was considering this to be the opera he wrote for Naples for the 1858 season.

However, Ballo had a troubled history and, originally, Somma wrote the libretto under the title of Gustavo III. As a result of required changes by, firstly, the Bourbon censors and, then, the Papal ones, it became transformed into Un vendetta in domino (with a different setting and characters' names).

Finally, for its Rome premiere, the opera became Un ballo in maschera, but with another location change (this time to Boston in colonial times) and further title and name changes.

Overall, Somma then specialized in stage plays and wrote no further libretti.
