= The Salt Prince =

- Theatrical release poster by V. Vavrek
- German: Soľ nad zlato, Der Salzprinz
- Directed by: Martin Hollý
- Written by: Martin Hollý; Peter Kováčik
- Starring: Libuše Šafránková; Karol Machata; Gábor Nagy (actor); Jozef Kroner
- Cinematography: Dodo Šimončič
- Edited by: Maximilián Remeň
- Music by: Karel Svoboda
- Production companies: Slovenský film Koliba, Omnia film Munchen
- Distributed by: Slovenská požičovňa filmov Bratislava
- Release date: February 27, 1983
- Running time: 85 minutes
- Countries: Czechoslovakia, West Germany
- Language: Slovak

The Salt Prince (Slovak: Soľ nad zlato, Czech: Sůl nad zlato, German: Der Salzprinz, Italian: Il Principe del Sale) is a 1983 Slovak fairy-tale film based on a novel by Pavol Dobšinský. The film's central lesson is that salt, as it is necessary for life, is more precious than gold and emeralds.

== Viewpoint ==
The Salt Prince makes several observations about life and human nature. It also probes into Slovak cultural heritage and values.

== Plot ==
The old king Pravoslav wants to pass his throne on to one of his three daughters. The closest to his heart is his youngest, Maruška, but he wants to confirm his decision by reason not only by feelings, so he follows the advice of the court jester to decide according to their confessions of daughterly love towards him and of their bridegrooms. At the ceremony of confessions the oldest of the sisters, who loves money and power, pleases her father with the confession that she loves him more than gold. Her bridegroom promises power and order to his country. The younger one, who is obsessed with jewelry, confesses that she loves him more than even the most expensive jewels. Lastly, Maruška confesses that she loves him more than salt, because salt is a requisite for life. Her bridegroom, the Salt Prince, promises love to his daughter, prosperity, justice, and charity towards their people if he and Maruška should reign. The king is offended by Maruška's confession, because salt is common – everybody, even the poor, have some. The Salt Prince tries to defend Maruška, but her father expels Maruška from his kingdom. Meanwhile, the King of Nature, the father of the Salt Prince, appears and places a curse upon Pravoslav's kingdom. From then on, every grain of salt within the kingdom would turn to gold, a good of supposed great worth. This event would not only influence the kingdom, but also the Salt Prince: because his ideas of good and of good will were taken so negatively, he disappears and is turned into a pillar of salt in the underworld. Maruška, expelled from the country of her father, undertakes a journey of finding her lost love, the Salt Prince. She finds the way to the underworld, the kingdom of the King of Nature.

Meanwhile, Pravoslav and his other two daughters enjoy the gold they have, but once all of the food in the kingdom has become utterly unpalatable due to lack of salt, the two bridegrooms start quarrelling about money and the people of the kingdom strive to find any ingredient which would make their bread comestible. When illnesses start to spread, Pravoslav decides to sell gold in exchange for salt from the neighboring country. However, as carriages with gold cross the border, the contents change to salt – and as salt (re)enters Pravoslav's kingdom, it returns to gold. After realizing that this is happening, they recognize that their kingdom is cursed.

After being in the underworld, Maruška meets a group of nymphs who help her to find a wise old woman, who will advise her where to look for the Salt Prince. Here, Maruška is given a test in order to prove that she is capable of fighting for her love and able to resist temptation: she is tasked to fill an old, dry well with water from a nearby stream. The well proves to be incapable of being filled in this manner, so she becomes distraught, but persists because of the love she feels. While being exhausted and dirty from her labors, a prince comes and asks her to marry him, but she refuses because she loves the Salt Prince. After this, the old woman advises her that she has to collect the tears of the people from her father's country, which are concentrated in the underworld meadow of oblivion. After collecting the tears, she revives the Salt Prince, whom she marries. As a marriage gift from the King of the Nature, the young couple is given a bag of salt which can never become depleted. They depart from the kingdom of the underworld to Pravoslav's country, where they give the people salt. Pravoslav passes his crown to them and decrees that, in order to remind the people and guarantee that such a story should never repeat, people shall from that time welcome each stranger not only with bread, but also with salt.

== Cast ==
- Karol Machata ... King Pravoslav
- Libuše Šafránková ... Princess Amelia
- Gábor Nagy ... Salt Prince
- Ladislav Chudík ... King of Nature (the Underworld)
- Zuzana Kocúriková ... Princess Vanda
- Dietlinde Turban ... Princess Barbora
- Ľubomír Paulovič ... Prince Kazimír
- Juraj Kukura ... King Norbert
- Diethard Kirschlechner ... Argonit
- Jozef Kroner ... clown
- Viera Strnisková ... Old wise woman (Mother of nymphs)
- Vlasta Fabiánová ... fostress
- Tibor Bogdan ... counsellor
- Anton Šulík ... Chef
- Ján Kramár ... leader of guards
- Juraj Paška ... marshal
- Anton Korenčí ... cashier
- Milan Kiš ... jeweller
- Ivan Krivosudský ... gardener
- Boris Farkaš ... foreign prince
- Jaroslav Rozsíval ... shopkeeper with salt
- Helena Húsková ... kingdom's tailor

== Themes ==
One of the themes is the depiction of old Slovak tradition of welcoming guests with bread and salt. Bread symbolizes utility necessary for life whereas salt symbolizes love and the act of giving, which makes life meaningful. Wisdom stemming from life experience, especially that of common people, as collected by Dobšinský, are featured in the narrative. The state of being lost with ideals, after experiencing crash with reality is shown in the metaphor of the petrified Salt Prince. The ideal of selfless love is shown in the scene where Maruška does not stop filling the dry well even when she sees no results stemming from her actions. The metaphor of reconciling mistakes is shown in the scene where Maruška collects the tears of the people hurt by her father's mistake on the meadow of forgetting (Oblivion) and uses them to revive the Salt Prince. The metaphor of the curse uttered upon those disregarding and nature, symbolized by Pravoslav's contempt towards salt and the son of the King of Nature (Underworld), shows the damage that man's domination can cause and its consequences when not controlled.

== Quotations ==
- "People strive only for gold and now they have it. You can not recognize true gifts of Mother Earth!" King of Nature (Underworld)
- "Not everywhere can be the waterwell, but it is important to try." Old wise woman (Mother of nymphs)
- "They fight and kill each other, lead wars, loot the insides of the mother Earth for silly vanity." King of Nature (Underworld)

== Reception ==
The film received mixed reviews. Critics said it was overly sad and gloomy. In addition, this version was compared in Czechoslovakia in with the older Czech version of the story Byl jednou jeden král (Once Upon a Time There Was a King) from 1954 which was better received and considered a classic. This version of the film is still played at Christmas in Slovakia.

== See also ==
- Water and Salt
- Cap-o'-Rushes
- The Goose-Girl at the Well
- The Dirty Shepherdess
