= King Leir =

Anonymous Elizabethan play

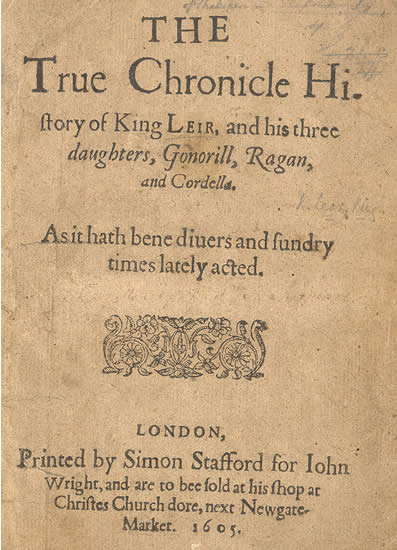
1605 quarto of The True Chronicle History of King Leir

King Leir is an anonymous Elizabethan play about the life of the ancient Brythonic king Leir of Britain. It was published in 1605 but was entered into the Stationers' Register on 15 May 1594. The play has attracted critical attention principally for its relationship with King Lear, Shakespeare's version of the same story.

== Performance ==
The records of theatre impresario Philip Henslowe show that King Leir was performed on 6 and 8 April 1594 at the Rose Theatre, by a cast that combined personnel from two acting companies, Queen Elizabeth's Men and Sussex's Men. Other records claim that the play was often acted, though these two are the only specific performances known. It has been suggested that Shakespeare, who might have been a player in the Queen's company of the 1590s, may have performed in King Leir.

== Publication ==
The moste famous Chronicle historye of Leire king of England and his Three Daughters was entered into the Stationers' Register on 14 May 1594, by stationer Adam Islip; but Islip's name is crossed out of the record and the name of fellow stationer Edward White is substituted. Perhaps this conflict between stationers prevented the play's publication in 1594; certainly it did not appear in print until the next decade. It was registered again on 8 May 1605 (as the Tragecall historie of kinge Leir and his Three Daughters &c) by stationer Simon Stafford. The first edition appeared later that year, printed by Stafford for the bookseller John Wright, with the title The true Chronicle History of King Leir and his three daughters, Gonorill, Ragan and Cordella. The title page states that the drama "hath been diverse and sundry times lately acted". The 1605 quarto was the sole edition of the play during the 17th century.

== Authorship ==
There is no consensus of scholarly opinion on the authorship of King Leir. The play has been variously attributed to Thomas Kyd, Robert Greene, George Peele, Thomas Lodge, Anthony Munday, and Shakespeare himself.

== Sources ==
The author drew primarily on Raphael Holinshed's Chronicles for the story of Leir and his daughters. Other sources and influences include Geoffrey of Monmouth's Historia Regum Britanniae, The Mirror for Magistrates, William Warner's Albion's England, and Edmund Spenser's The Faerie Queene.

In turn, critics widely agree that King Leir served as a primary source for Shakespeare's King Lear.

== Genre ==
King Leir has been called a "chronicle history", a "tragical history", a "tragicomedy", and even "a tragedy with a happy ending". (Leir is alive and restored to his kingship at the end of his play.) Leir does not contain the subplot about Gloucester, Edgar, and Edmund that Shakespeare added to the story.

== The Annesley case ==
Some commentators have argued that King Leir was printed in 1605 to take advantage of the attention drawn by Shakespeare's similar play – which would mean that Shakespeare's Lear was being acted in 1605. Yet "a remarkable historical parallel" provided "a topical reason" for the publication of Leir, and perhaps also for Shakespeare's interest in the story c. 1605.

A true-life scandal with noteworthy parallels to the Leir/Lear story was in the news in 1603 and 1604, and may have helped to inspire both Shakespeare's play and the publication of the old play King Leir. Brian Annesley (or Anslowe) was an elderly former follower of Queen Elizabeth, a wealthy Kentishman with three daughters: Grace (married to Sir John Wildgose), Christian (the wife of William Sandys, 3rd Baron Sandys), and the youngest, the unmarried Cordell, who had been a maid of honour to Queen Elizabeth. In 1603, Grace tried to have her father declared senile and incompetent to manage his estate. Cordell wrote to Robert Cecil, 1st Earl of Salisbury, to protest her older sister's action, and otherwise supported her father against his eldest daughter. Brian Annesley died in July 1604; Cordell successfully defended her father's last will and testament, which left most of the family property to Cordell.

One of the executors of the will was Sir William Hervey; he was a veteran of the 1588 campaign against the Spanish Armada and the third husband of the Dowager Countess of Southampton, the mother of Shakespeare's patron Henry Wriothesley, 3rd Earl of Southampton. (Hervey is also one of the many proposed candidates for the "W. H." of Shakespeare's sonnets.) Once the Dowager Countess died in 1607, Hervey married Cordell Annesley.
