= The Goose-Girl at the Well =

German fairy tale

Folk tale
- Name: The Goose-Girl at the Well
- Aarne–Thompson grouping: ATU 923
- Country: Germany
- Published in: Grimm's Fairy Tales

"The Goose-Girl at the Well" (German: Die Gänsehirtin am Brunnen) is a German fairy tale collected by the Brothers Grimm (KHM 179). It is Aarne-Thompson type 923 ('Love Like Salt').

== Synopsis ==
An old woman raised geese in the mountains. One day, speaking of her heavy burden, she persuaded a count to carry it for her up the mountain. He found it burdensome, but she would not let him even rest. When they arrived at the hut, there was an ugly girl tending the old woman's geese, but the old woman would not let them stay together, lest "he may fall in love with her". Before the old woman sent the count away, she gave him a box cut out of an emerald as thanks for carrying her burden.

The count wandered the woods for three days before he arrived at a town where a king and queen reigned. He showed them the box. When the queen saw the box, she collapsed as if dead, and the count was led to a dungeon and kept there. When the queen woke, she insisted on speaking with him. She told him that her youngest daughter had been a beautiful girl who wept pearls and jewels. But one day, when the king had asked his three daughters how well they loved him, the youngest said that she loved him like salt. The king divided his kingdom between the two older girls and drove the youngest out, giving her only a sack of salt. The king regretted this decision afterward, but the girl was never to be found again.

When the queen had opened the box, a pearl just like how her daughter's jewel tears looked like was in it. The count told them where he had gotten the box, and the king and queen resolved to speak with the old woman.

Meanwhile, in the mountains, the ugly girl washed in a well by night. She became a beautiful girl, though sad. She returned to her usual form when the moonlight was blocked. When she returned to the hut, the old woman was cleaning the hut, although it was late. The old woman told the girl that it had been three years, so they could stay no longer together. The girl was upset, and asked what would happen to her, but the old woman said that she was disrupting her work and sent her to wait in her room.

The count had gone with the king and queen but become separated. He saw the ugly girl make herself beautiful and was entranced by her beauty. He followed her, and met with the king and queen at the hut. The old woman said to the king and queen that they could have spared themselves a walk if they had not been so unjust to their daughter. She led them in and told their daughter to come out of the room, and the family wept to see each other again.

The old woman disappeared and the hut became a castle. The count married the youngest princess, and they lived there ever afterward.

== In popular culture ==
=== Television ===
- It was turned into a TV movie by Fernsehen Der DDR in East Germany in 1979.
- It was adapted as part of the TV series Simsala Grimm under a differently translated English title "The Two Princesses". However, the King Lear-esque backstory was changed to have the princess be cast out by her stepmother.

=== Music ===
- Based on the fairy tale, the German musical production ''Gans oder gar nicht!'' opened in 2015 at the Waldbühne Kloster Oesede in Georgsmarienhütte.

== See also ==
- Water and Salt
- Cap O' Rushes
- The Dirty Shepherdess
- King Lear
