= The Dirty Shepherdess =

Folk tale
- Name: The Dirty Shepherdess
- Aarne–Thompson grouping: ATU 923 (Love Like Salt)
- Country: France

The Dirty Shepherdess (La Pouilleuse) is a French fairy tale collected by Paul Sébillot in Les Littératures populaires de toutes les nations, Volume I (Littérature orale de la Haute-Bretagne). Andrew Lang included it in The Green Fairy Book.

== Plot summary ==
A king asked his two daughters how much they loved him. His older said as the apple of her eye. The younger said as much as the salt on her food. He ordered her out of the kingdom. She went, with her dresses and jewels. She made herself ugly, so that a farmwife would not be unready to lease her, and wore beggar's clothing. Finally, she was leased as a shepherdess. One day, she dressed herself in her fine gowns just to remember. The prince, hunting, saw her, and asked who the beautiful woman was who tended the sheep, garnering much ridicule. The prince fell ill with longing, and said that only a loaf of bread baked by the shepherdess would cure him. She made it, and her ring fell into the dough. When he ate it, he found the ring and declared he would marry only the woman whose finger it fitted. When every other woman had tried it, he insisted on the shepherdess as well, and the ring fit her. She dressed herself in her fine gowns, and the king agreed to the wedding.

She insisted that they ask her father's permission and invite him to the wedding. She had his food cooked without salt, and he realized that he had misinterpreted her words.

== Analysis ==
This tale seems related to the common fairy tale classified as Aarne-Thompson-Uther Index ATU 923, "Love Like Salt", in which a father rejects his youngest daughter for a statement of her love that does not please him.

== See also ==
- Cap O' Rushes
- Donkeyskin
- The Goat Girl
- The Goose-Girl at the Well
- Water and Salt
