= R. A. Foakes =

20th/21st-century English author and Shakespeare scholar

Reginald A. Foakes (18 October 1923 – 22 December 2013) was an English author and Shakespeare scholar. He has published works on Shakespeare and the Romantic poets and edited many of Shakespeare's plays in the Arden and New Cambridge editions. He also helped found the Shakespeare Institute in Stratford-upon-Avon. He was Professor Emeritus in the department of English literature at UCLA. He died at his home in Stratford-upon-Avon.

Beyond Shakespeare, his scholarly work also included editing the theatrical papers of Philip Henslowe, work on Samuel Taylor Coleridge's literary criticism.

In 2001, the University of Birmingham gave Foakes an honorary degree in honor of the 50th anniversary of their Shakespeare Institute in Stratford-upon-Avon.
