= William Warner (poet) =

English poet and lawyer

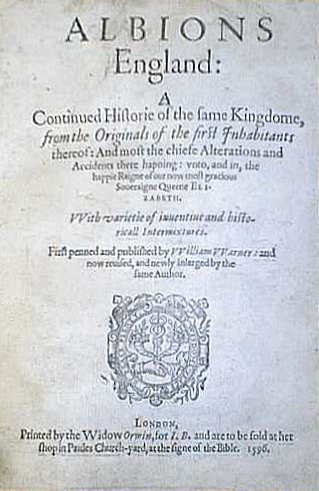
Title page of Albion's England, 1586

William Warner (1558? – 9 March 1609) was an English poet and lawyer.

== Life ==
William Warner was born in London about 1558. In his later published work, Albion's England, Warner describes his father accompanying explorer Richard Chancellor on a voyage to Russia in 1553 and dying on a voyage to The Guianas in 1557. The 17th century antiquarian Anthony Wood states that Warner was educated at Magdalen Hall, Oxford, but there are no records to support this, or that he took a degree there. He practised in London as an attorney, and gained a great reputation among his contemporaries as a poet. He married Anne Dale in 1599 and their son William was born at Ware, Hertfordshire in 1604. Warner died suddenly at Great Amwell in Hertfordshire on 9 March 1609.

== Works ==
His chief work is a long poem in fourteen-syllabled verse, entitled Albion's England (1586), and dedicated to Henry Carey, 1st Baron Hunsdon. His history of his country begins with Noah, and is brought down to Warner's own time including the beheading of Mary, Queen of Scots. The chronicle is by no means continuous, and is varied by fictitious episodes, the best known of which is the idyll in the fourth book of the loves of Argentine, the daughter of the king of Deira, and the Danish prince, Curan.

His book, with its patriotic subject, was very popular. Francis Meres ranked him with Spenser as the chief heroical poets of the day, and compared him with Euripides.

His other works are Pan His Syrinx, or Pipe (1584), a collection of prose tales; and a translation of the Menæchmi of Plautus (1595). Albion's England consisted originally of four "books," but the number was increased in successive issues, and a posthumous edition (1612) contains sixteen books. It was reprinted (1810) in Alexander Chalmers's English Poets.

== Sources ==
- Lee, Sidney (1899). "Warner, William" . In Lee, Sidney (ed.). Dictionary of National Biography. Vol. 59. London: Smith, Elder & Co.
