= Water and Salt =

Italian fairy tale

Water and Salt is an Italian fairy tale, it can be found in the collection Italian Popular Tales, collected by Thomas Frederick Crane.

In the Aarne-Thompson classification system, Water and Salt is Type 923.

== Synopsis ==
A king with three beautiful daughters asks them how much they love their father, the eldest says she love him as bright as the sunshine, the second as wide as the ocean, and the youngest as much as water and salt. The father, not satisfied with the youngest daughter's reply, sentences her to death. Her two sisters instead give a small dog and one of the youngest sister's garments to the executioners. They cut off the small dog's tongue, and show the king, saying it was the youngest princess's. In reality, the executioners left her in a cave.

She is found in that cave by a wizard who takes her into his castle across from a palace. Here a King's son falls in love with the Princess, and a match is soon agreed upon. The day before the wedding, they kill and quarter the wizard, and the blood turns the castle into a palace.

On the day of the wedding, the girl passes salt and water to everybody except for the King. When asked why he is not eating, he explains he is not feeling well. After the meal, everyone tells stories. The king tells the crowd of the daughter he executed. He is devastated, but then the Princess puts on the same dress she had when she told him she loved him as much as water and salt. She tells him how hard it is to eat anything without any water and salt, and he realizes how much she loved him all along. Reconciled, they embrace.
