= Eudaf Hen =

Mythic king of Welsh legend

Eudaf Hen (Eudaf "the Old") is a figure of Welsh tradition. He is remembered as a King of the Britons and the father of Elen Luyddog and Conan Meriadoc in sources such as the Welsh prose tale The Dream of Macsen Wledig and Geoffrey of Monmouth's Latin chronicle Historia Regum Britanniae. He also figures into Welsh genealogies. Geoffrey of Monmouth calls him Octavius, a corruption and faux-Latinization of Old Welsh/Breton Outham (later spelled Eudaf). According to the medieval Welsh genealogy from Mostyn MS. 117, Eudaf was a direct ancestor of King Arthur.

== Etymology ==
Modern Welsh Eudaf (Middle Welsh Eudav, early Old Welsh Out(h)am) comes from Brittonic *Aui-tamos meaning "Very Strong in Will".

== Geoffrey of Monmouth ==
Geoffrey of Monmouth, in his Historia Regum Britanniae, renders the name in pseudo-Latin form as Octavius and introduces him as a half-brother to Constantine I, who has become King of the Britons following the death of his father Constantius. Eventually Constantine is made Roman Emperor, requiring him to leave Britain in the hands of a proconsul. Octavius (Eudaf Hen), rebels against Roman rule, killing the proconsul and proclaiming himself king.

Constantine responds by sending three legions to Britain under the command of his great-uncle Trahern, the brother of the late King Coel. Trahern lands at "Kaerperis" and captures it, forcing Octavius to conscript all the island into the army to combat the Roman legions. Octavius engages Trahern in a field outside Winchester and is victorious. Trahern flees to Alba (Scotland) and pillages the land, and Octavius comes after him. They meet at Westmorland, and Octavius was defeated and forced out of Britain. Trahern takes the crown himself, while Octavius seeks aid from King Gunbert of Norway. In Britain, supporters of Octavius ambush Trahern and kill him near London, allowing Octavius to return to Britain. Once arrived, he scatters the Roman forces and retakes the throne of Britain, gaining an incredible amount of wealth and prestige.

Eventually, Caradocus, Duke of Cornwall, suggests that Octavius marry his only daughter Helen to the new Roman Emperor, Maximianus (Magnus Maximus), thereby uniting the British and Roman crowns. Octavius agrees, and Caradocus' son Mauricius is sent to Rome with the proposal. However Octavius' nephew Conan Meriadoc (elsewhere his son) opposes the union, and nearly attacks the arriving Maximianus. Finally Caradocus restores the peace, and Octavius abdicates the throne in favor of Maximianus.

== The Breton Life of Saint Gurthiern ==
Utilizing an archaic spelling of his name, Eudaf Hen is mentioned as Outham Senis (Outham "the Old") in a fabricated genealogy from the Life of Saint Gurthiern, included in the Breton Latin Kemperle Cartulary, compiled between 1118 and 1127. This text traces the descent of Saint Gurthiern back to the ancestor figure Beli (Beli Mawr) son of Outham son of Maximianus (Maximus) son of Constantius the son of Constantine the son of Helen "who was thought to have held the Cross of Christ". Outham is given another son, Kenan (Conan Meriadoc), who is said to have been the founder of Brittany. Evidence suggests that the sources for the Life originated in Wales. The text's compiler, Gurheden, says that his source for the information was one "Iuthael son of Aidan"; while the name Iuthael is a Brythonic name known in both Wales and Brittany, the Gaelic Aidan is not attested in early Brittany, but is known in Wales. Additionally, Gurthiern's genealogy corresponds strongly with the descent elsewhere attributed to the Welsh saint Cadoc, further suggesting a Welsh origin.

== The Dream of Macsen Wledig ==
Although the Mabinogion tale Breudwyt Macsen Wledic (The Dream of Macsen Wledig) is written in later manuscripts than Geoffrey's version, the two accounts are so different that scholars agree the Dream cannot be based purely on Geoffrey's version. The Dream's account also seems to accord better with details in the Triads, so it perhaps reflects an earlier tradition.

Macsen Wledig, the Emperor of Rome, dreams one night of a lovely maiden in a wonderful, far-off land. Awakening, he sends his men all over the earth in search of her. With much difficulty they find the maiden in a rich castle in Wales, Segontium (Caernarfon), and lead the Emperor to her. Everything he finds is exactly as in his dream, including the presence of her young, gwyddbwyll-playing brothers Cynan (Conan Meriadoc) and Gadeon, as well as her father, king Eudaf Hen, son of Caradawc (Caradog ap Bran). The maiden, whose name is Helen or Elen Llwyddawc, accepts and loves him. Because Elen is found a virgin, Macsen gives her father sovereignty over the island of Britain and orders three castles built for his bride. In Macsen's absence, a new emperor seizes power and warns him not to return. With the help of men from Britain led by Cynan and Gadeon, Macsen marches across Gaul and Italy and recaptures Rome. In gratitude to his British allies, Macsen rewards them with a portion of Gaul that becomes known as Brittany.

== Medieval Welsh Genealogies and Triads ==
Eudaf appears in a number of medieval Welsh genealogies and Triads including:

=== Genealogies from Jesus College MS 20 ===
==== The lineage of Saint Cattwg (Llyma weithon ach Cattwc sant) ====
Kynan son of Eudaf son of Custenin son of Maxen son of Maximianus son of Constantinus son of Custeint.

==== Family of Cunedda (Plant Cunedda) ====
The wife of Coel Hen was daughter of Gadeon son of Eudaf Hen (Gwreic Coyl hen oed verch Gadeon m Eudaf hen vchot).

==== Lineage of Morgan son of Owein (Ach Morgan ab Owein) ====
Gereint son of Erbin son of [Custennin son of] Kynwawr son of Tudwawl son of Gwrwawr son of Gadeon son of Cynan son of Eudaf Hen.

=== Genealogies from Mostyn MS. 117 ===
Arthur son of Vthyr son of Kustenhin son of Kynuawr son of Tutwal son of Moruawr son of Eudaf son of Kadwr son of Kynan son of Karadawc son of Bran son of Llyr lletieith.

=== The North Britain Triads ===
==== These are the three times when the Lordship of Gwynedd went by the Distaff ====
One of them was Stradweul daughter of Gadean ap Cynan ab Eudaf ap Caradog ap Bran ap Llyr Llediaith; and this Stradweul wife of Coel Godebog was mother to Dyfrwr and mother to Ceneu son of Coel (Vn o naddunt yw Stradweul verch Gadean ap Kynan ap Eudaf ap Kyradawg ap Bran ap Llyr llediaith, gwreig i Goel Godebac hon oedd vam Dyfrwr a mam Genev ap Koel).

== Medieval Welsh Poetry ==
=== The Gododdin ===
The "daughter of Eudaf Hir (the Tall)" is mentioned briefly in the famous poem Gododdin of Aneirin:

A.67 (LXVII):
Ardyledawc canu claer orchyrdon
Ar neges mynydawc mynawc maon
A merch Eudaf hir dreis gwananhon
Oed porfor gwisgyadur dir amdrychyon

"Poetry as deserved for brilliant high hosts.
for the purpose of the courtly subjects of the mountain realm,
and the daughter of Tall Eudaf, [there came] the violence of border fighting.
The breakers of countries were dressed in purple."

=== Lewis Glyn Cothi ===
The poet Lewis Glyn Cothi (fl. 1447-86 CE), in an ode to Dafydd ap Sion of Gower, compares his subject to Macsen Wledig and his bride Gwenllian (daughter of Jenkin son of Owen) to Elen daughter of Eudaf:

XXXVI, I Davydd ap Sion, o Vro Wyr, l. 51:
Ail yw Gwenllian Elen verch Eudav;
"Gwenllian is a second Elen daughter of Eudaf"

Legendary titles
Unknown	Duke of the Gewissei	Unknown
Preceded by Constantine I	King of Britain first reign	Succeeded by Trahern
Preceded by Trahern	King of Britain second reign	Succeeded by Maximianus
