= Porth yr Aur =

Coordinates: 53°08′27″N 4°16′41″W

Porth yr Aur is a Grade I listed 13th-century fortification in Caernarfon which forms part of Caernarfon Castle's medieval defences. Originally known as the West gate, it was the main seaward entrance to the walled town. The building has been the home of the Royal Welsh Yacht Club since 1854. Porth yr Aur forms part of the Castles and Town Walls of King Edward in Gwynedd UNESCO world heritage site.

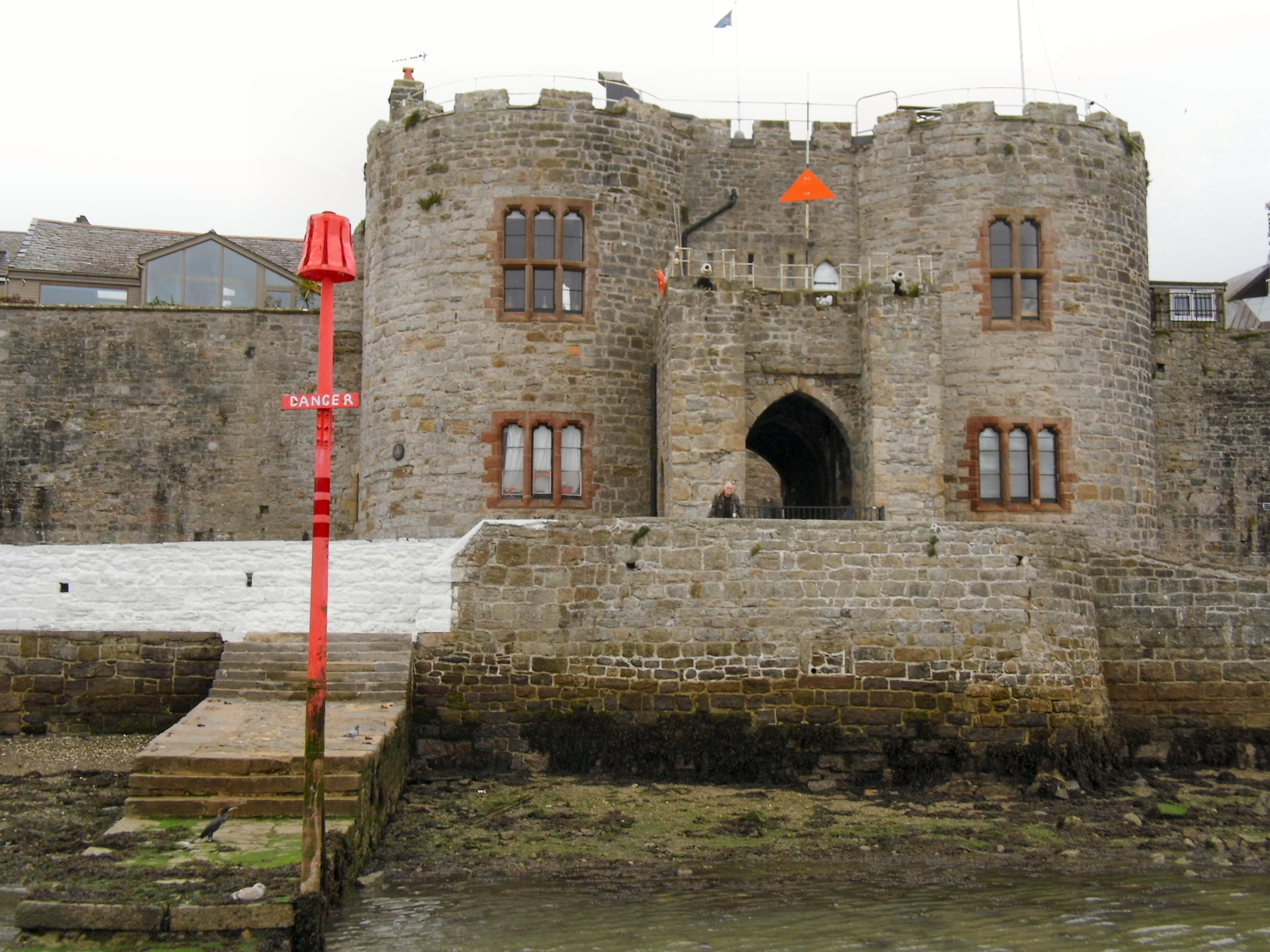
Porth Yr Aur (the golden gate) currently owned by the royal Welsh yacht club

Construction began in 1283 at the same time as Caernarfon castle, both integral components of the city walls, and was completed by 1292.

== History ==
Porth Yr Aur and the town walls were constructed on the instruction of Edward I in order to consolidate his conquest and occupation of North Wales on 1283. Caernarfon became the main base of English power in North Wales and the borough of Caernarfon was created under the statute of Wales in 1284. The walls and castle were built under the direction of James of St George, who was Edwards military architect in North Wales, and cost £3500 by completion in 1292. In 1294, the Welsh revolted under the leadership of Madog Ap Llywelyn During this period, Porth Yr Aur was badly damaged and was repaired and improved at a cost of £1195, a considerable sum for the period. The gate was further renovated in 1326 when it became home to William of Shaldeford, though it wasn't referred to as Porth Yr Aur until the 16th century.

Following the English Civil War maintaining the Castles defences became less important, although seven canons were installed on Porth Yr Aur in the 1790s to defend against the threat of Napoleonic invasion. The decline of the walls was arrested in the 19th century as parts were acquired for use in housing and offices, as the towns population expanded significantly due to the booming slate trade Porth Yr Aur was acquired by the recently formed Welsh Royal Yacht Club in 1854 and was remodelled and restored to fit this new purpose. The club was founded in 1847 and first received royal patronage in 1859 from Prince Edward, later Edward VII. The clubs most recent patron was Prince Philip.

== Architecture ==
Porth yr Aur was built as the western gate to the city of Caernarfon, built as a twin towered gatehouse with a projecting barbican, as it was the only route into the city from the quayside. The towers are crenelated two story round towers, in contrast to the Polygonal towers of the castle. The single story barbican, built from coursed limestone, is similarly crenelated, with projecting corner turrets. One of the Napoleonic era canon is still in place on the gate.
