= Conan Meriadoc =

Legendary 4th-century king of Britain

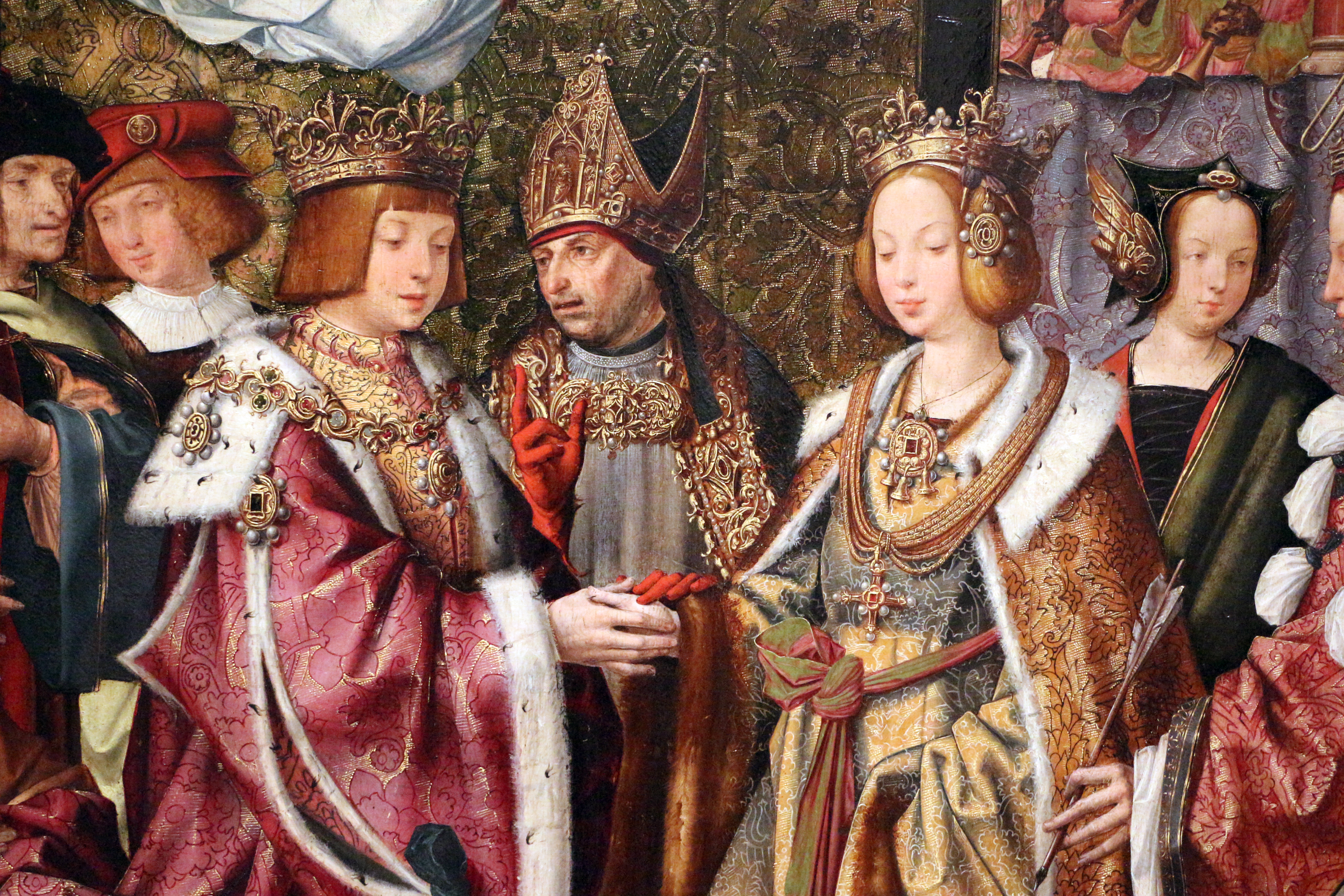
- Detail from the Saint Auta Altarpiece (Lisbon, 1522–25), depicting the marriage of Conan and Saint Ursula
- Born: 4th century
- Known for: Legendary British Celt who was said to have founded Brittany
- Spouse(s): Saint Ursula and Darerca of Ireland

Conan Meriadoc (/ˈkoʊnən/; Welsh: Cynan Meiriadog; Breton: Konan Meriadeg) is a legendary British Celtic leader credited with founding Brittany. Versions of his story circulated in both Brittany and Great Britain from at least the early 12th century, and supplanted earlier legends of Brittany's foundation. His story is known in two major versions, which appear in the Welsh text known as The Dream of Macsen Wledig, and in Geoffrey of Monmouth's Historia Regum Britanniae. Both texts associate him with Magnus Maximus (Macsen Wledic, reigned 383–388), a Roman usurper against the Valentinianic dynasty who was widely regarded as having deprived Britain of its defences when he took its legions to claim the imperial throne. Conan's cousin or sister, Saint Elen, is said to have been Macsen Wledic's wife.

== Early evidence ==
The earliest undisputed evidence connecting Conan to the foundation of Brittany appears in the Life of Saint Gurthiern, included in the Kemperle Cartulary compiled between 1118 and 1127. This text traces the descent of Gurthiern back to the ancestor figure Beli Mawr, given as a son of Outham Senis (Outham the Old), the figure known in later sources as Eudaf Hen and Octavius. Outham is given another son, Kenan (an Old Welsh spelling of Conan), who is said to have been the founder of Brittany. This reference shows that the Conan story was known in Brittany from a comparatively early date, but certain evidence suggests that it was imported from Wales. The text's compiler, Gurheden, says that his source for the information was one "Iuthael son of Aidan"; while the name Iuthael is a brittonic name known in Wales and Brittany as well as Devon and Cornwall, the Gaelic Aidan is not attested in early Brittany but is known in Wales. Additionally, Gurthiern's genealogy corresponds strongly with the descent elsewhere attributed to the Welsh saint Cadoc, further suggesting a Welsh origin.

Conan Meriadoc also appears in the prologue to the Latin Life of Saint Goeznovius, though the date of this text is disputed. The prologue, the only part of the work still extant, survives in a copy by the French historian Pierre Le Baud (died 1505), but contains a passage claiming it was originally written in 1019 by a certain Guillaume, a servant of Bishop Eudo. This date has been defended by Gwenaël Leduc and Léon Fleuriot. However, Hubert Guillotel has argued that the text dates instead to the mid-12th century.

There is evidence that Conan Meriadoc figured into the brittonic prophetic tradition as a messianic saviour who would return to lead his people in a time of need. A Cynan appears in several prophetic poems, most notably the Armes Prydein, where he is named alongside Cadwaladr as a figure whose return is promised. Geoffrey of Monmouth, whose knowledge of this tradition is evinced in both the Historia Regum Britanniae and the Vita Merlini, specifically identified this Cynan with Conan Meriadoc. Rachel Bromwich suggests that Geoffrey was relying on an older tradition identifying the founder of Brittany with the prophetic Cynan, and argues that this identification is made already in Armes Prydein. At the time Armes Prydein was composed, the Breton nobility under Alan II of Brittany had forged an alliance with Æthelstan, king of England, in the face of Viking attacks on their territory. Hywel Dda, then ruler of most of Wales, had also formed a similar relationship with Æthelstan at that time. In spite of this, the poet repeatedly refers to the men of Llydaw (Brittany) as part of his prophesied pan-Celtic union which will oust the English from Britain for good. Bromwich reads the line "A chymot Cynan gan y gilyd" ("there will be concord between Cynan and his fellow") as a reference to the reunion of the Bretons and their leader Conan Meriadoc with their fellow Britons.

== Geoffrey and the Dream of Macsen ==
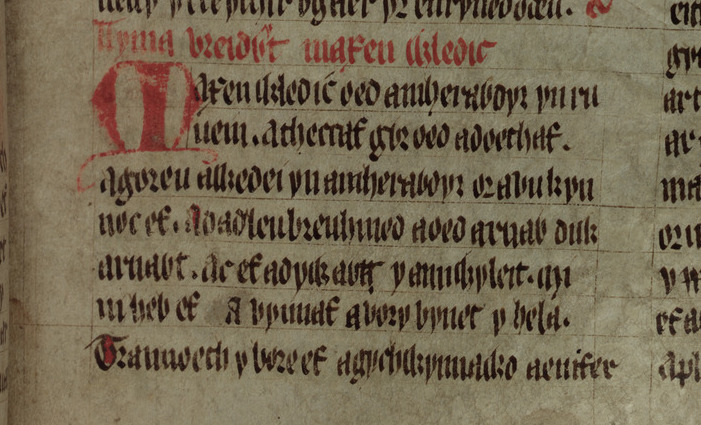
One of the Mabinogi's tales: The Dream of Macsen Wledig; opening lines from the Red Book of Hergest: Maxen wledig oedd amherawdr yn Rhufain, a thecaf gwr oedd a doethaf.

The story of Conan is attested in several medieval sources, the most substantial versions being those included in Geoffrey of Monmouth's Historia Regum Britanniae and the Welsh tale known as The Dream of Macsen Wledig. Both of these tie Conan and the founding of Brittany to the story of the Roman usurper Magnus Maximus, though in both cases this is heavily embellished. In Geoffrey, Conan is the nephew of Octavius, King of the Britons (Welsh Eudaf Hen), and a potential heir to the throne. When the throne is offered instead to "Maximianus", Geoffrey's version of Magnus Maximus, Conan at first opposes him, but the two are reconciled after Maximianus' marriage to Octavius' daughter. Later Maximianus leads the armies of Britain to march on Rome, and he quickly conquers Armorica, where he establishes Conan as the king with instructions to found "another Britain". He does so, and repels numerous attacks from the Gauls and Aquitanians, and asks for British wives for his men from Maximianus' regent Dionotus, with whose daughter, Saint Ursula, he was said to be "most passionately in love", as reflected in her legends. Later, when Maximianus has been killed in Rome, his fleeing troops return to Armorica and join Conan's settlement.

The version of the story given in The Dream of Macsen Wledig differs from the Historia account on a number of points. Though the text postdates Geoffrey, it contains material older than either version. In The Dream, Conan is the son, rather than nephew, of Eudaf Hen (Geoffrey's Octavius), and the brother of Saint Elen. Maxen Wledig (Magnus Maximus), here portrayed as the rightful Roman Emperor rather than a usurper, sees Elen and her kingdom in a dream vision, and seeks her out and marries her. In this version Conan and his brother Afaon immediately become Maxen's loyal associates, later helping him reclaim the throne of Rome. For this service the grateful Macsen gives Conan dispensation to lead his army to conquer whatever realm he wants. Conan chooses Armorica, where he kills all the men and replaces them with his own soldiers. He then orders the tongues of all the women cut out, lest their speech corrupt that of the Britons; a fanciful etymology connects this event with Welsh name of Brittany, Llydaw, supposedly from the Welsh lled-taw or "half-silent".

== Later developments ==
The Conan story became a dominant founding myth for the Bretons for hundreds of years. Earlier traditions of the foundation of the Brittonic settlement in Armorica are recorded in Gildas' De Excidio et Conquestu Britanniae and in the hagiographies of various saints. Especially important in this regard are the stories of the so-called Seven Founder Saints of Brittany, which were largely forgotten or overlooked after the spread of the Conan legend.

In the wake of Geoffrey and The Dream of Macsen, Conan subsequently appears as a founder-figure in several genealogies of Breton aristocratic families. He is venerated as the ancestor of the Rohans, according to the Life of Saint Meriadoc, the protagonist of which is said to have been descended from him. Meriadoc appears in one of the genealogies from Jesus College MS 20, which traces the descent of Geraint mab Erbin, king of Dumnonia in the West Country, back to "Cynan map Eudaf Hen". In the Cornish miracle play Beunans Meriasek, Conan is a kinsman of Saint Meriasek who tries (unsuccessfully) to dissuade Meriasek from pursuing a religious life.

In the 15th century the Bretons used the Conan story as it appears in the Life of Saint Meriadoc to establish precedence for the Breton aristocracy over the kings of France. The story's political impact declined with the Union of Brittany and France in 1532, and it thereafter declined in popularity. However, in the 17th century the Rohans used their supposed descent from Conan Meriadoc to seek status as "foreign princes" at the French court; King Louis XIV recognised their pedigree, but denied their foreign status. Beginning in the mid-18th century Breton historians attempted to establish the historical existence of Conan, though he is now regarded as a mythical figure.

== See also ==
- Gradlon
- Ys

== Notes ==
Regnal titles
| First | Legendary British Kings (Brittany) | Unknown Next known title holder: Aldroenus |
