= Andragathus =

Andragathus (Ancient Greek: Ἀνδράγαθος) was a man in ancient Greece given command of the garrison at Amphipolis by Demetrius I of Macedon in 287 BCE to keep the threat of rival general Lysimachus in check while Demetrius went off to wage war against Pyrrhus of Epirus at Beroea (now modern Veria). Andragathus surrendered the city to Lysimachus, perhaps after being offered a bribe.

In some works, the name Andragathus is used to refer to the murderer of Roman emperor Gratian. This person's name was actually Andragathius.
