= Royal Welsh Yacht Club =

Yacht clubs

Coordinates: 53°8′26″N 4°16′41″W

- Ensign
- Short name: RWYC
- Founded: 1847
- Location: Porth-yr-Aur, Caernarfon, Gwynedd, Wales
- Commodore: Tom Edges
- President: Neville Roberts
- Website: Royal Welsh Yacht Club

The Royal Welsh Yacht Club (RWYC) (Welsh: Clwb Iotio Brenhinol Cymru) is a yacht club based in Caernarfon, Gwynedd, Wales. It is one of the oldest yacht clubs still operating in the world today, and the one situated in the oldest premises. It is the fourteenth Royal Yacht Club in Britain and one of the twelve oldest clubs in the world.

== History ==
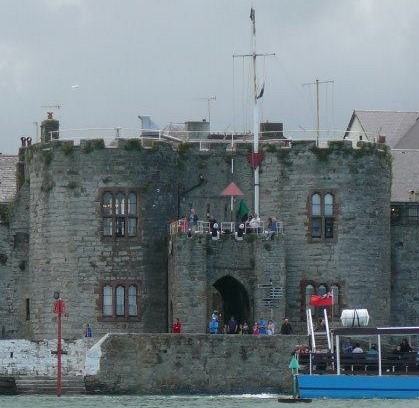
Clubhouse as seen from the Menai Strait

The Royal Welsh Yacht Club was formed in Caernarfon in 1847 by local solicitor Llewellyn Turner, William Knight (Rear-Commodore of Royal Harwich Yacht Club), Lord George Douglas-Pennant and other prominent locals. It became the 14th Royal Yacht Club in Britain and the first in Wales. Sailing regattas had been held in the town in 1829 and 1846 and were subsequently organised regularly by the club. The first flag officers at the club were Commodore Henry Paget K.G.; Vice-Commodore Robert Stephenson and Rear-Commodore Llewelyn Turner. On 5 May the same year it was also awarded the warrant to fly the defaced blue ensign and three days later Queen Adelaide, bestowed her royal patronage upon the club. In 1854 the Club took the 13th century Porth-yr-Aur, formerly the town's west gate or watergate, built c.1284, as its clubhouse.

== Membership ==
As of April 2023, the club had 301 members. Its membership was 260 as of April 2022.

== Notable members ==
Club members have achieved a number of seafaring accomplishments, including major ocean crossings and circumnavigations of the world. Notable members include:

- Robert Stephenson, a civil engineer who designed the Britannia Bridge across the Menai Strait, who was the first vice-commodore of the club.
- Thomas Assheton Smith, a vice-commodore of the club, whose schooner, Titania, competed in the first America's Cup (then known as the 100 Guineas Cup).
- Lionel Rees, who in 1933 sailed single-handedly across the Atlantic from Wales to Nassau in a ketch, for which he was awarded the prestigious Blue Water Medal by the Cruising Club of America in 1934.
