= Battle of Poetovio =

388 CE battle

Coordinates: 46.4186°N 15.8714°E

Date	c. July 388 CE
Location	Drava River, near Ptuj, modern Slovenia
Result	Eastern Roman victory

Belligerents
Eastern Roman Empire	Western Roman Empire

Commanders and leaders
Theodosius I	Magnus Maximus; Marcellinus

The Battle of Poetovio was fought in 388 between the forces of Western Roman Emperor Magnus Maximus and the Eastern Roman Emperor Theodosius I. Magnus Maximus's army was defeated and he was later captured and executed at Aquileia.

== Background ==
Following the death of Emperor Valentinian I, his son Gratian, already co-emperor, assumed the role of Emperor of the Western Roman Empire while his other son, Valentinian II, a child of four, was proclaimed Emperor. On 19 January 379, months following the death of Emperor Valens at the Battle of Adrianople, Gratian appointed Theodosius as Emperor of the Eastern Roman Empire. Theodosius set about containing the incursions by Goths into the empire.

In 383, Magnus Maximus was proclaimed Emperor in Roman Britain. Gratian, in the midst of campaigning against the Alemanni, heard of the revolt and marched his army towards Paris. Maximus quickly transported his army across the channel, landing at the mouth of the Rhine. By the time Gratian arrived in Paris, Maximus was waiting. After a five day skirmish, Gratian's army deserted him. Gratian fled, and was later murdered.

In 387, following Theodosius's edict to raise taxes, the Eastern Roman Empire experienced a general uprising. Taking advantage of riots in major cities throughout the eastern Roman empire, Maximus invaded Italy. Valentinian II and his court fled, first to Aquileia and then to Salonica, to seek the protection of Theodosius.

Theodosius greeted the imperial court of Valentinian at Salonica. Faced with the choice of avoiding a civil war or supporting Valentinian, Theodosius chose Valentinian. Theodosius took his time gathering Alans, Goths, Huns, and Armenians into his army. He planned to attack Maximus in Italy, while marching with the main army into Pannonia. Along with his two-prong attack on Maximus's territory, Theodosius also stationed a sizable force in Egypt, due to demonstrations in favour of Maximus.

Maximus, in the meantime, had marched part of his army to Siscia commanded by Andragathius, blocking Theodosius's advance into Italy. When Maximus learned of Theodosius navy moving towards Italy, he ordered Andragathius to intercept, but he failed to stop Theodosius naval attack. Theodosius I arrived at Siscia with a large force consisting of Goths, Huns and Alans as cavalry.

== Battle ==
A brief skirmish at Siscia occurred between the two armies. Theodosius's cavalry, consisting of Alans, Goths, and Huns, charged across the Sava river directly at Maximus's forces. Maximus's forces broke and ran, being massacred by Theodosian forces. Theodosius's army took very few casualties.

Theodosius continued his march and met Maximus's army under the command of his brother, Marcellinus, at Poetovio. The following day, the battle started with both armies' infantry fighting in squares. The cavalry of both armies appear to have negated each other, neither unable to gain an advantage. Maximus's infantry fought "with the desperation of gladiators", unwilling to yield ground. Finally Theodosius's infantry gained the upper hand and Maximus's troops either capitulated or fled. Maximus fled to Aquilia.

== Aftermath ==
After his decisive victory Theodosius, following in swift pursuit, besieged Maximus in his refuge of Aquilia, a fortress west of the Julian Alps. The garrison soon surrendered, delivering Maximus to Theodosius. The death of Maximus (August 28th), and of his son Victor (captured and executed by Arbogastes), ended the conflict. Now in command of the entire Roman world, Theodosius planned to court the Roman nobility during his stay in Italy (388–391).

== Sources ==
- Ambrose of Milan (2005). Liebesschuetz, J.H.W.G. (ed.). Ambrose of Milan: Political Letters and Speeches. Liverpool University Press.
- Burns, Thomas S. (1994). Barbarians Within the Gates of Rome: A Study of Roman Military Policy and the Barbarians, ca. 375-425 A.D. Indiana University Press.
- Elton, Hugh (2018). The Roman Empire in Late Antiquity: A Political and Military History. Cambridge University Press.
- Halsall, Guy (2007). Barbarian Migrations and the Roman West, 376–568. Cambridge University Press.
- Kaldellis, Anthony (2024). The New Roman Empire: A History of Byzantium. Oxford University Press.
- Lenski, Noel Emmanuel (2002). Failure of empire: Valens and the Roman state in the fourth century A.D. University of California Press. ISBN 978-0-520-23332-4.
- Mitchell, Stephen; Greatrex, Geoffrey (2023). A History of the Later Roman Empire, AD 284-700 (3rd ed.). John Wiley & Sons.
- White, Cynthia (2011). The Emergence of Christianity: Classical Traditions in Contemporary Perspective. Fortress Press.
- Williams, Stephen; Friell, Gerard (1995). Theodosius, The Empire at Bay. Yale University Press.
- Wolfram, Herwig (1988). History of the Goths. Translated by Dunlap, Thomas J. University of California Press.
