= Saint Elen =

Late 4th century Welsh founder of churches

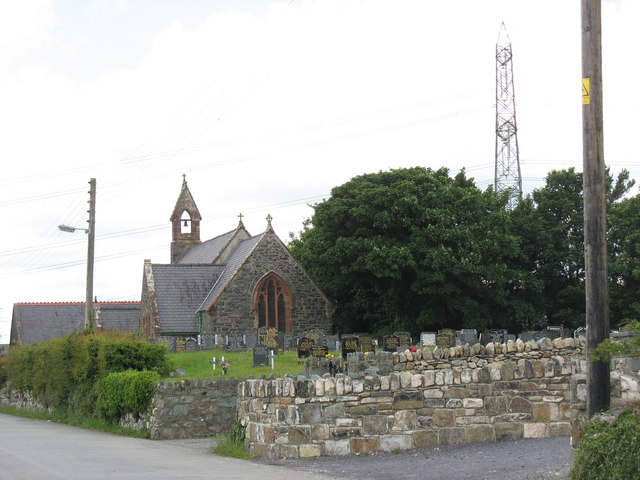
St Helen's parish church, Penisa'r Waun, Gwynedd, Wales

Saint Elen (Welsh: Elen Luyddog, lit. "Helen of the Hosts"), often anglicized as Helen, was a late 4th-century founder of churches in Wales. Although never formally canonized by Rome, Elen is traditionally considered a saint in the Welsh Church; in English she is sometimes known as Saint Helen of Caernarfon to distinguish her from Saint Helena ("Helen of Constantinople").

== Church tradition ==
Traditionally, she is said to have been a daughter of the Romano-British ruler Octavius / Eudaf Hen (and therefore sister of Conan Meriadoc) and the wife of Magnus Maximus / Macsen Wledig, the 4th-century emperor in Britain, Gaul, and Spain who was killed in battle in 388.

Elen was mother of five, including a boy named Custennin or Cystennin (Constantine). She lived about sixty years later than Helena of Constantinople, the mother of Constantine the Great, with whom she has often been confused. She is patron of Llanelan in West Gower and of the church at Penisa'r-waun near Caernarfon, where her feast day is 22 May. Together with her sons, Cystennin and Peblig (Publicus, named in the calendar of the Church in Wales), she is said to have introduced into Wales the Celtic form of monasticism from Gaul. Saint Gregory of Tours and Sulpicius Severus record that Maximus and his wife met Saint Martin of Tours while they were in Gaul.

== Literary tradition ==
Elen's story is told in The Dream of Macsen Wledig, one of the tales associated with the Mabinogion. Welsh mythology remembers her as the daughter of a chieftain of north Wales named Eudaf or Eudwy, who probably lived somewhere near the Roman base of Segontium, now Caernarfon. She is remembered for having Macsen build roads across her country so that the soldiers could more easily defend it from attackers, thus earning her the name Elen Luyddog (Elen of the Hosts).

== Legacy ==
She is said to have ordered the making of Sarn Helen, the great Roman road running from Caernarfon to south Wales via Dolgellau, Pennal and Bremia (Llanddewi Brefi). Though this road bears her name, it is considerably older than Elen's accepted time period. Many other Roman roads in Wales bear her name (e.g. Llwybr Elen) and she is thus acknowledged as the patron saint of British roadbuilders and the protectress of travellers. There are over 20 holy wells in Britain dedicated to a "Saint Helen", although these are frequently taken as honoring the mother of Constantine the Great.

== Sources ==
- Morris, Lewis; Evans, Daniel Silvan (1878). Celtic Remains. J. Parker. p. 159. LCCN 10-13761. OCLC 12825229. OCLC 34225220. Google Book Search. Retrieved on January 25, 2009. (She is listed as ELEN verch Eudaf.)
- Farmer, David Hugh (1997). The Oxford Dictionary of Saints (4th ed). Oxford [u.a.]: Oxford University Press. ISBN 0-19-280058-2. ISBN 978-0-19-280058-9. LCCN 97-12837 OCLC 36597843 (She is listed as Helen of Caernarvon.)
- Pennick, Nigel (1997). The Celtic Saints: An Illustrated and Authoritative Guide to These Extraordinary Men and Women. New York: Sterling Pub.; London: Thorsons. ISBN 0-7225-3481-7. ISBN 0-8069-9600-5. ISBN 978-0-7225-3481-6. ISBN 978-0-8069-9600-4. LCCN 96-39794. OCLC 35986219. OCLC 36791984. OCLC 59667225.
