= Llewellyn Turner =

Welsh politician

Sir Llewellyn Turner (February 11, 1823 – September 18, 1903), was a Welsh politician and Deputy Constable of Caernarfon Castle.

He was born at Parkia, Criccieth, the son of William Turner of Parkia, who had been High Sheriff of both Caernarfonshire (1823–24) and Merionethshire (1832–33). He was educated privately by Rev H. D. Owen, DD.

He served eleven consecutive years as Mayor of Caernarfon from 1859 to 1870, and was Deputy Constable of Caernarfon Castle.

Commodore of the Royal Welsh Yacht Club, in 1860 he received the thanks of the Lord Commissioners of the Admiralty and of the officers commanding the West Coast of England and Wales, for his exertions in promoting and keeping up the Reserve Forces of the Royal Navy.

Knighted in 1870, he was appointed High Sheriff of Caernarvonshire in 1886–1887, 43 years after his father had held the same post.

Honorary titles
Preceded by John Ernest Greaves	High Sheriff of Caernarvonshire; 1886–1887	Unknown
