= Trahern =

Legendary Briton king

Trahern (Welsh: Trahaearn) is a legendary King of the Britons in Geoffrey of Monmouth's fictional Historia Regum Britanniae.

According to Geoffrey, Trahern was king of the Britons and Roman senator. He was the brother of the late Coel Hen and uncle of Saint Helena. Trahern was sent by Emperor Constantine I to restore Britain to Roman rule during the usurpation of Octavius (Eudaf).

When Octavius took control of Britain from Rome, Constantine sent three Roman legions to Britain under the command of Trahern. He landed at 'Kaerperis' and captured it forcing Octavius to conscript all the island into the army to combat the Roman legions. Octavius met Trahern in a field outside Winchester where they fought and Octavius won.

Trahern fled to Albany and pillaged the land. That caused Octavius to react again, where he met Trahern in Westmorland, but Octavius was defeated this time. Octavius fled Britain and Trahern took on the crown himself. A few years later, supporters of Octavius, who was in exile in Norway, attacked Trahern in a forest. They killed him and Octavius immediately returned and was recrowned king.

Legendary titles
Preceded by Octavius	King of Britain	Succeeded by Octavius
