= Caernarfon Castle =

Medieval fortress in Gwynedd, Wales

- Castell Caernarfon (Welsh) (Note: Since 2024, Cadw, who maintain the site, use the Welsh name only.)
- Caernarfon, Gwynedd in Wales
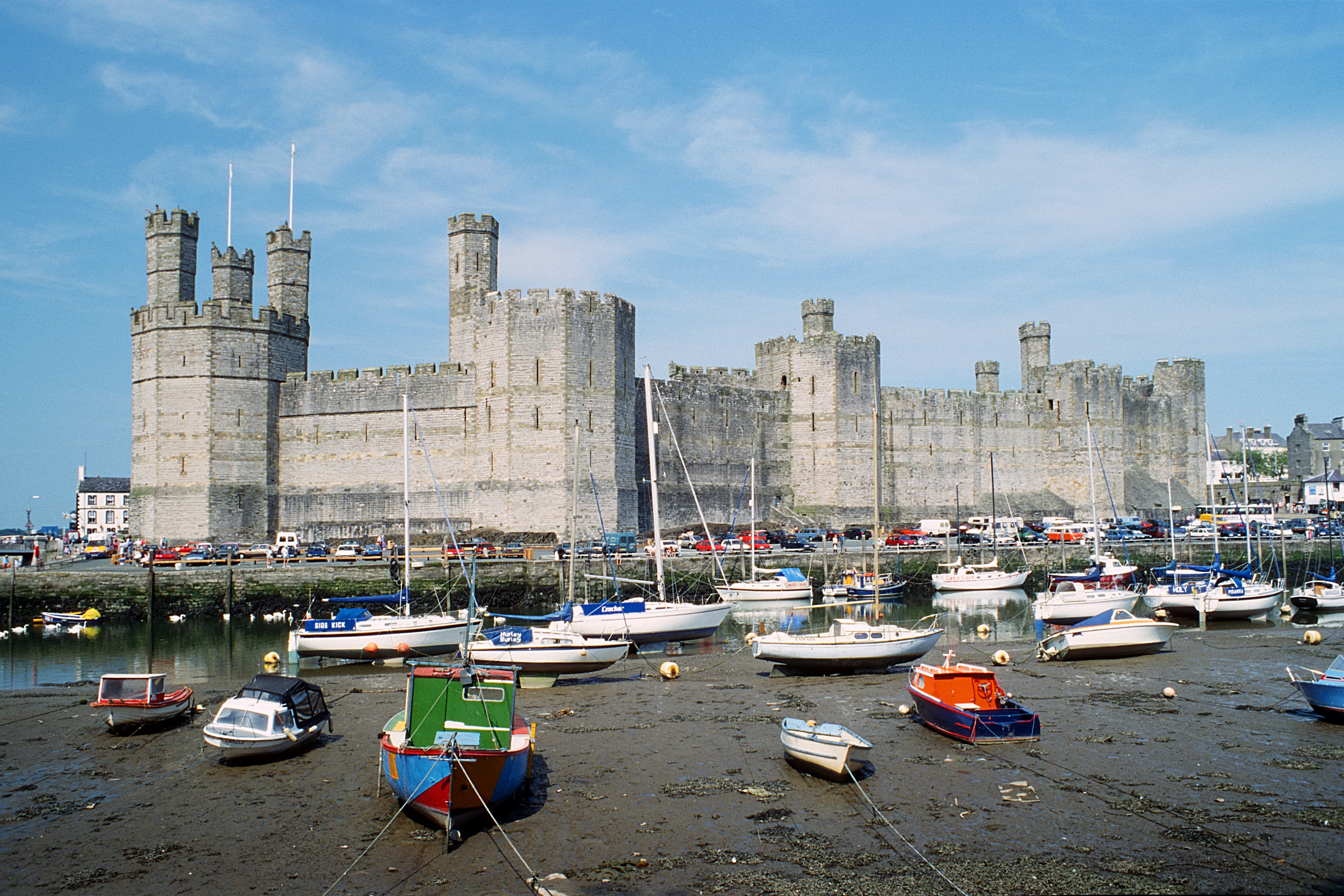
- The castle from across the River Seiont

Site information
- Type: Castle
- Open to the public: Yes
- Website: Castell Caernarfon (Cadw)

Location
- Location in Wales
- Location within Wales
- Coordinates: 53.1393°N 4.2769°W

UNESCO World Heritage Site
- Part of: Castles and Town Walls of King Edward in Gwynedd
- Criteria: Cultural: i, iii, iv
- Reference: 374
- Inscription: 1986 (10th Session)

Listed Building – Grade I
- Official name: Caernarfon Castle
- Designated: 31 March 1983; 43 years ago
- Reference no.: 3814

Caernarfon Castle (Welsh: Castell Caernarfon; Welsh pronunciation: [kastɛɬ kaɨrˈnarvɔn]) is a medieval fortress in Gwynedd, north-west Wales. The first fortification on the site was a motte-and-bailey castle built in the late 11th century, which King Edward I of England began to replace with the current stone structure in 1283. The castle and town established by Edward acted as the administrative centre of north Wales, and as a result the defences were built on a grand scale. There was a deliberate link with Caernarfon's Roman past—nearby is the Roman fort of Segontium—and the castle's walls are reminiscent of the Walls of Constantinople.

While the castle was under construction, town walls were built around Caernarfon. The work cost between £20,000 and £25,000 from the start until the work ended in 1330. Although the castle appears mostly complete from the outside, the interior buildings no longer survive and many parts of the structure were never finished. In 1294 the town and castle were sacked and captured by Madog ap Llywelyn during his rebellion against the English, but were recaptured the following year. The castle was unsuccessfully besieged during the Glyndŵr Rising of 1400–1415. When the Tudor dynasty ascended to the English throne in 1485, tensions between the Welsh and English began to diminish and castles were considered less important. As a result, Caernarfon Castle was allowed to fall into a state of disrepair.

Despite its dilapidated condition, during the English Civil War Caernarfon Castle was held by Royalists and besieged three times by Parliamentarian forces. This was the last time the castle was used in war. The castle was neglected until the 19th century when the state funded repairs. The castle was used for the investiture of the Prince of Wales in 1911 and again in 1969. The castle is managed by Cadw, the Welsh Government's historic environment service. It is part of the World Heritage Site "Castles and Town Walls of King Edward in Gwynedd".

== Background ==
The first fortifications at Caernarfon were built by the Romans. Their fort, which they named Segontium, is on the outskirts of the modern town. The fort sat near the bank of the River Seiont; the fort was probably built here due to the sheltered position and because it could be resupplied via the river Seiont. Caernarfon derives its name from the Roman fortifications. In Welsh, the place was called y gaer (lenition of caer) yn Arfon, meaning 'the stronghold in the land over against Môn'; Môn is the Welsh name for Anglesey. Little is known about the fate of Segontium and its associated civilian settlement after the Romans departed from Britain in the early 5th century.

== Early castle ==
Following the Norman Conquest of England, William the Conqueror turned his attention to Wales. According to the Domesday Survey of 1086, the Norman Robert of Rhuddlan was nominally in command of the whole of northern Wales. He was killed by the Welsh in 1088. His cousin Hugh d'Avranches, Earl of Chester, reasserted Norman control of north Wales by building three castles: one at an unknown location somewhere in Meirionnydd, one at Aberlleiniog on Anglesey, and another at Caernarfon. This early castle was built on a peninsula, bounded by the River Seiont and the Menai Strait; it would have been a motte and bailey, defended by a timber palisade and earthworks. The motte, or mound, was integrated into the later Edwardian castle, but the location of the original bailey is uncertain, although it may have been to the north-east of the motte. Excavations on top of the motte in 1969 revealed no traces of medieval occupation, suggesting any evidence had been removed. It is likely that the motte was surmounted by a wooden tower known as a keep. The Welsh recaptured Gwynedd in 1115, and Caernarfon Castle came into the possession of the Welsh princes. From contemporary documents written at the castle, it is known that Llywelyn the Great and later Llywelyn ap Gruffudd occasionally stayed at Caernarfon.

== Edwardian castle ==
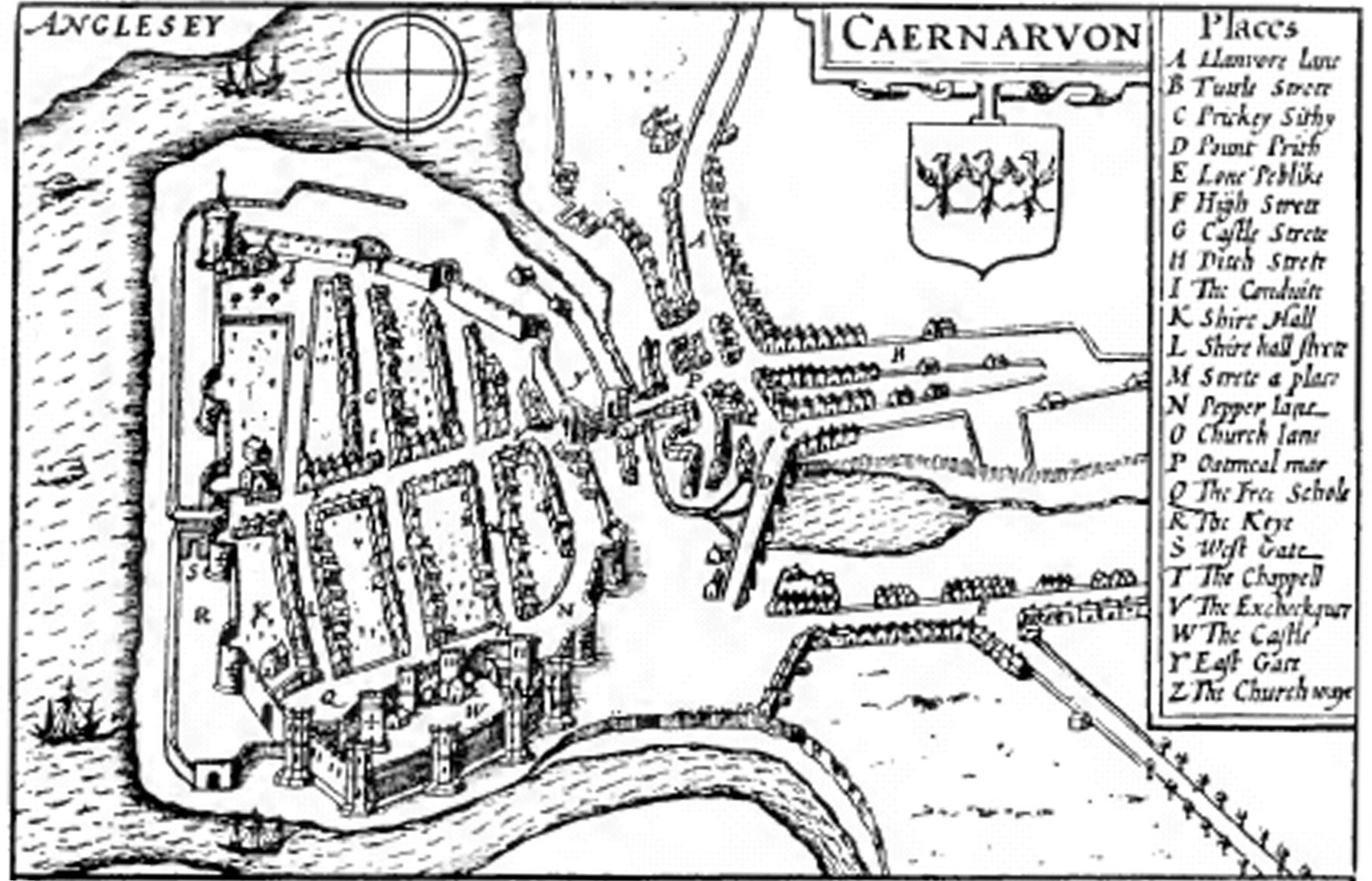
Map of Caernarfon in 1610 by John Speed. The castle was at the south end of the settlement.

War broke out again between England and Wales on 22 March 1282. The Welsh leader, Llywelyn ap Gruffudd, died later that year on 11 December. His brother Dafydd ap Gruffydd continued to fight against the English, but in 1283 Edward I was victorious. Edward marched through northern Wales, capturing castles such as that at Dolwyddelan, and establishing his own at Conwy. War finally drew to a close in May 1283 when Dolbadarn Castle, Dafydd ap Gruffudd's last castle, was captured. Shortly afterwards, Edward began building castles at Harlech and Caernarfon. The castles of Caernarfon, Conwy and Harlech were the most impressive of their time in Wales, and their construction—along with other Edwardian castles in the country—helped establish English rule. The master mason responsible for the design and construction of the castle was probably James of Saint George, an experienced architect and military engineer who played an important role in building the Edwardian castles in Wales. According to the Flores Historiarum, during the construction of the castle and planned town, the body of the Roman emperor Magnus Maximus was discovered, and Edward I ordered its reburial in a local church.

The construction of the new stone castle was part of a programme of building which transformed Caernarfon; town walls were added, connected to the castle, and a new quay was built. The earliest reference to building at Caernarfon dates from 24 June 1283, when a ditch had been dug separating the site of the castle from the town to the north. A bretagium, a type of stockade, was created around the site to protect it while the permanent defences were under construction. Timber was shipped from as far away as Liverpool. Stone was quarried from nearby places, such as from Anglesey and around the town. A force of hundreds worked on the excavation of the moat and digging the foundations for the castle. As the site expanded, it began to encroach on the town; houses were cleared to allow the construction. Residents were not paid compensation until three years later. While the foundations for the stone walls were being created, timber-framed apartments were built for Edward I and Eleanor of Castile, his queen. They arrived at Caernarfon on either 11 or 12 July 1283 and stayed for over a month.

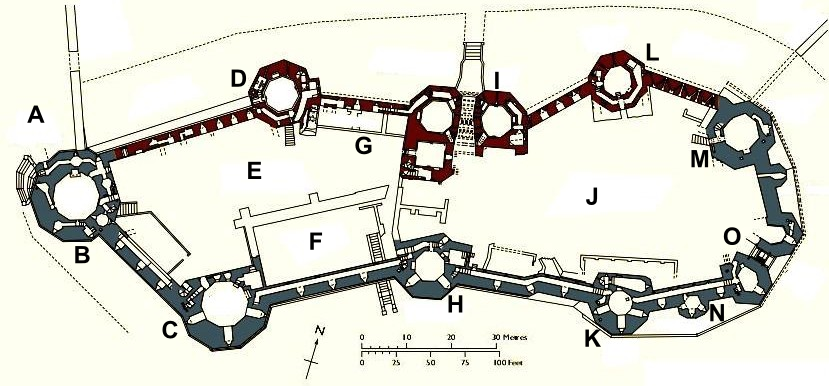
Plan of Caernarfon Castle: A – Site of Water Gate; B – Eagle Tower; C – Queen's Tower; D – Well Tower; E – Lower Ward; F – Great Hall; G – Kitchens; H – Chamberlain Tower; I – King's Gate; J – Upper Ward; K – Black Tower; L – Granary Tower; M – North-East Tower; N – Cistern Tower; O – Queen's Gate. Blue shows the area built between 1283–92, red that between 1295–1323

Construction at Caernarfon Castle continued over the winter of 1283–84. The extent of completion is uncertain, although architectural historian Arnold Taylor speculated that when Edward and Eleanor visited again in Easter 1284 the Eagle Tower may have been complete. The Statute of Rhuddlan, enacted on 3 March 1284, made Caernarfon a borough and the administrative centre of the county of Gwynedd. According to tradition, Edward II was born at Caernarfon on 25 April 1284. Edward was created Prince of Wales in 1301, with control over Wales and its incomes. Since then the title has traditionally been held by the eldest son of the monarch. According to a famous legend, the king had promised the Welsh that he would name "a prince born in Wales, who did not speak a word of English" and then produced his infant son to their surprise; but the story may well be apocryphal, as it can only be traced to the 16th century. In 1284, Caernarfon was defended by a garrison of forty men, more than the thirty-strong garrisons at Conwy and Harlech. Even in peace time, when most castles would have a guard of only a few men, Caernarfon was defended by between twenty and forty people due to its importance.

By 1285, Caernarfon's town walls were mostly complete. At the same time work continued on the castle. Spending on construction was negligible from 1289 and accounts end in 1292. Edward I's campaign of castle-building in Wales cost £80,000 between 1277 and 1304, and £95,000 between 1277 and 1329; by 1292 £12,000 had been spent on the construction of Caernarfon's castle—of which the southern façade was furthest along—and town walls. As the southern wall and town walls completed a defensive circuit around Caernarfon, the plan was to build the castle's northern façade last.

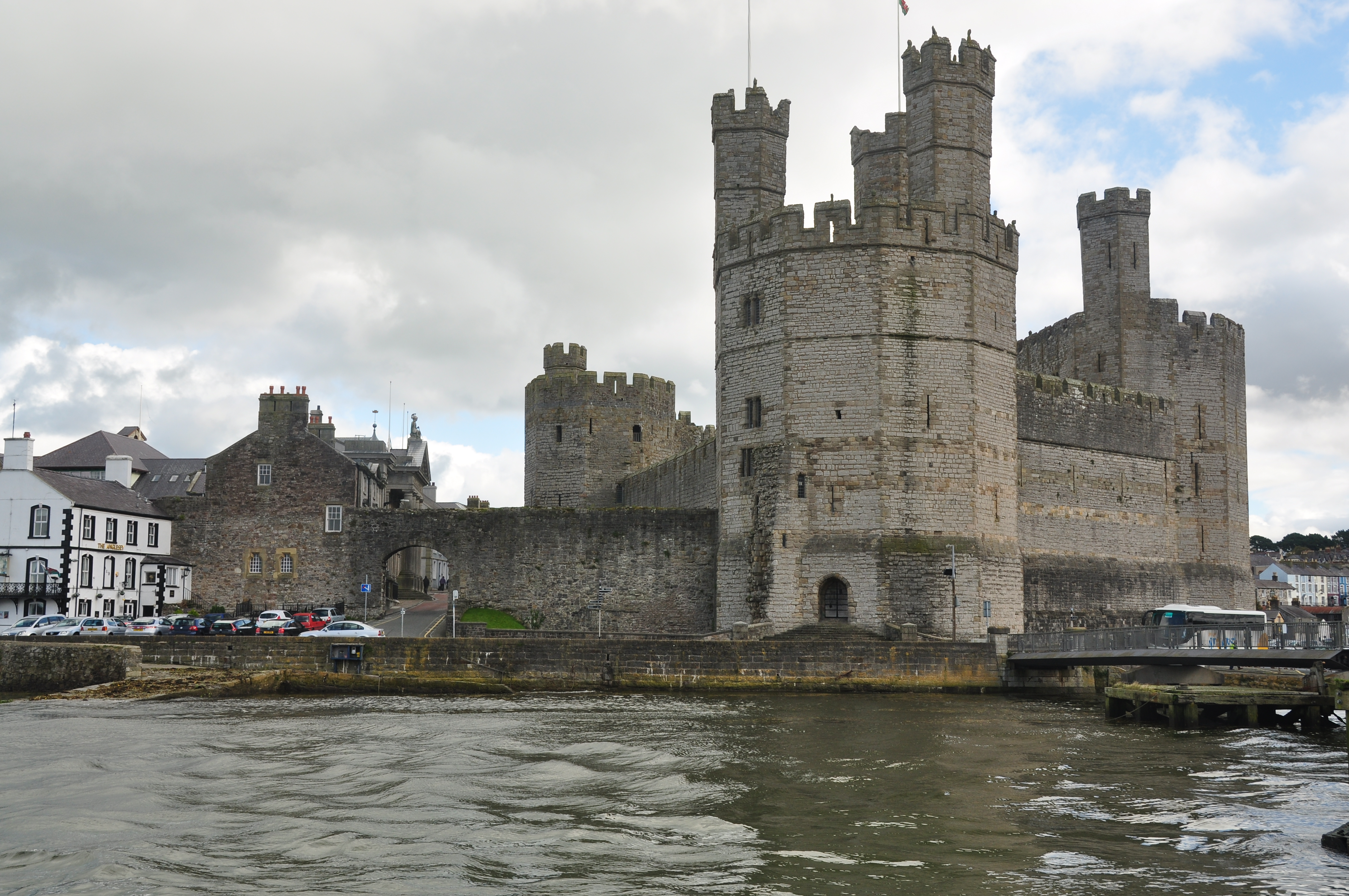
Caernarfon Castle from the west. The town's walls, which were mostly complete by 1285, join with the castle and continue off to the left of the photo.

In 1294, Wales broke out in rebellion led by Madog ap Llywelyn, Prince of Wales. As Caernarfon was the centre of administration in Gwynedd and a symbol of English power, it was targeted by the Welsh. Madog's forces captured the town in September, and in the process heavily damaged the town walls. The castle was defended by just a ditch and a temporary barricade. It was quickly taken and anything flammable was set alight. Fire raged across Caernarfon, leaving destruction in its wake. In the summer of 1295, the English moved to retake Caernarfon. By November the same year, the English began refortifying the town. Rebuilding the town walls was a high priority, and £1,195 (nearly half the sum initially spent on the walls) was spent on completing the job two months ahead of schedule. Attention then shifted to the castle and on finishing the work that had halted in 1292. Once the rebellion was put down, Edward began building Beaumaris Castle on the Isle of Anglesey. The work was overseen by James of Saint George; as a result, Walter of Hereford took over as master mason for the new phase of construction, though some historians, such as John Goodall, consider Walter to have been responsible for the design of Caernarfon from the outset. By the end of 1301, a further £4,500 had been spent on the work; the focus of the work was on the northern wall and towers. The accounts between November 1301 and September 1304 are missing, possibly because there was a hiatus in work while labour moved north to help out with England's war against Scotland. Records show that Walter of Hereford had left Caernarfon and was in Carlisle in October 1300; he remained occupied with the Scottish wars until the autumn of 1304 when building at Caernarfon resumed. Walter died in 1309 and his immediate subordinate, Henry of Ellerton, took over the position of master mason. Construction continued at a steady rate until 1330.

... to cause 100 suitable masons experienced in such work as the king is engaged upon at Kaernaruan to be chosen in the town of Chester and in other parts within his bailiwick, and to cause them to come with their tools to Kaernaruan without delay, there to do what Edmund the king's brother shall enjoin upon them, as the king needs masons for his work there at once

— A letter to the Earl of Chester in 1295, asking him to send masons to Caernarfon urgently.

From 1284 to 1330, when accounts end, between £20,000 and £25,000 was spent on Caernarfon's castle and town walls. Such a sum was enormous and dwarfed the spending on castles such as Dover and Château Gaillard, which were amongst the most expensive and impressive fortifications of the later 12th and early 13th centuries. Subsequent additions to Caernarfon were not major, and what remains of the castle is substantially from the Edwardian period. Despite the expense, much of what was planned for the castle was never carried out. The rears of the King's Gate (the entrance from the town) and the Queen's Gate (the entrance from the south-east) were left unfinished, and foundations in the castle's interior mark where buildings would have stood had work continued.

== Later history ==
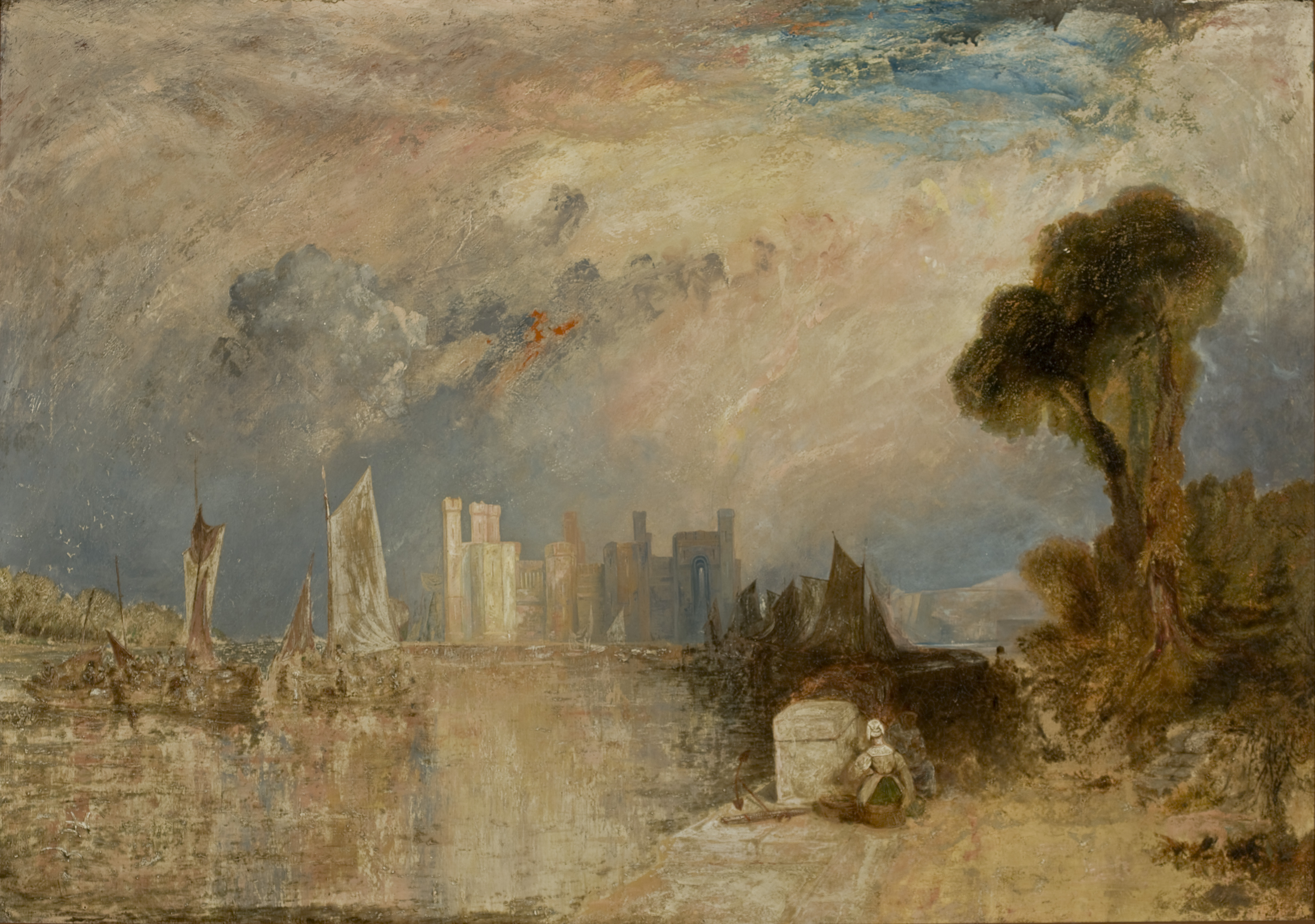
A painting of Caernarfon by J. M. W. Turner in 1830–1835

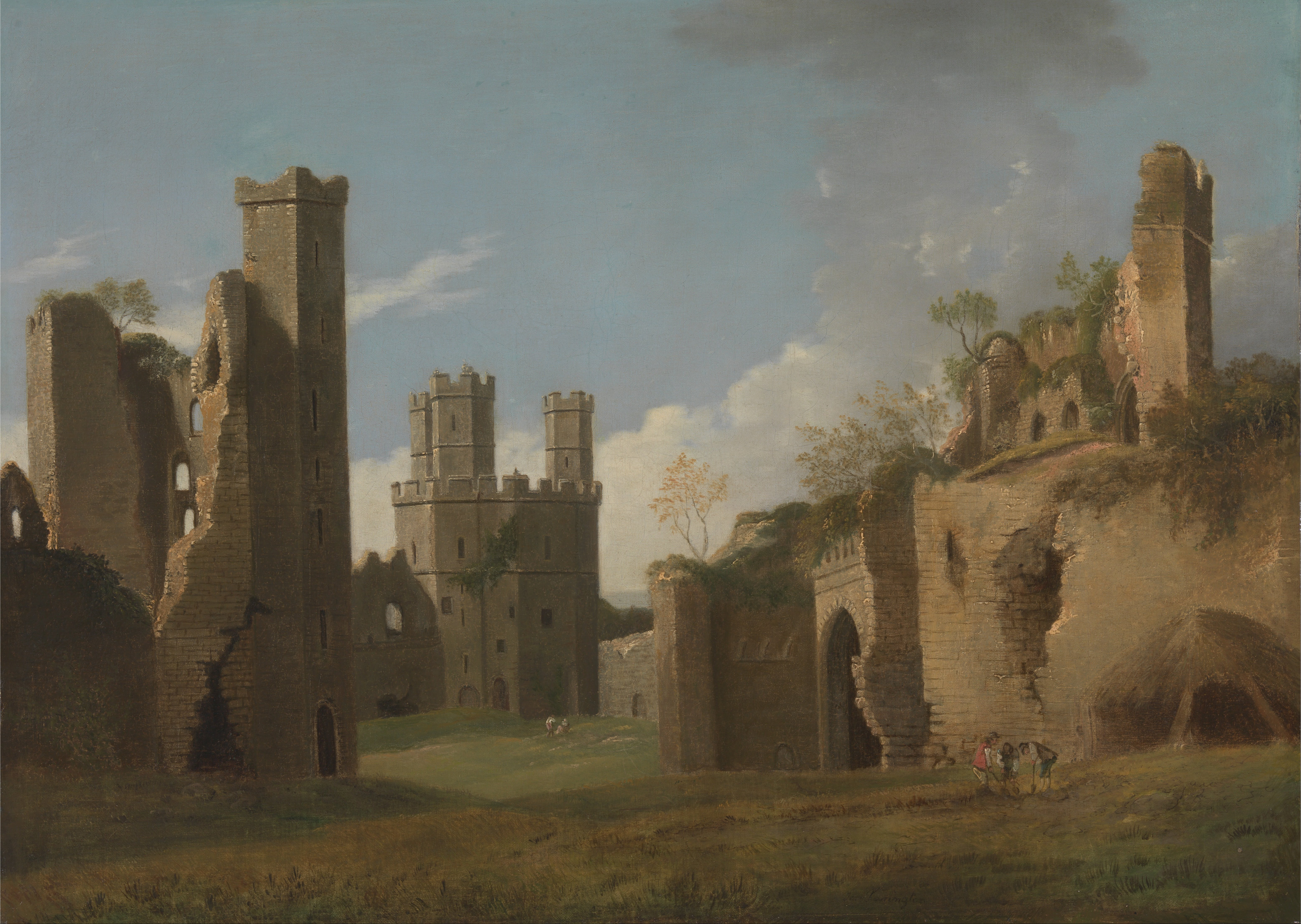
A painting of Caenarfon castle from the 18th century by Joseph Farrington

For around two centuries after the conquest of Wales, the arrangements established by Edward I for the governance of the country remained in place. During this time the castle was constantly garrisoned, and Caernarfon was effectively the capital of north Wales. There was a degree of discrimination, with the most important administrative jobs in Wales usually closed to Welsh people. Tension between the Welsh and their English conquerors spilled over at the start of the 15th century with the outbreak of the Glyndŵr Rising (1400–1415). During the revolt, Caernarfon was one of the targets of Owain Glyndŵr's army. The town and castle were besieged in 1401, and in November that year the Battle of Tuthill was fought nearby between Caernarfon's defenders and the besieging force. In 1403 and 1404, Caernarfon was besieged by Welsh troops with support from French forces; the garrison at the time was around thirty. The accession of the Tudor dynasty to the English throne in 1485 heralded a change in the way Wales was administered. The Tudors were Welsh in origin, and their rule eased hostilities between the Welsh and English. As a result, castles such as Caernarfon, which provided secure centres from which the country could be administered, became less important. They were neglected, and in 1538 it was reported that many castles in Wales were "moche ruynous and ferre in decaye for lakke of tymely reparations".

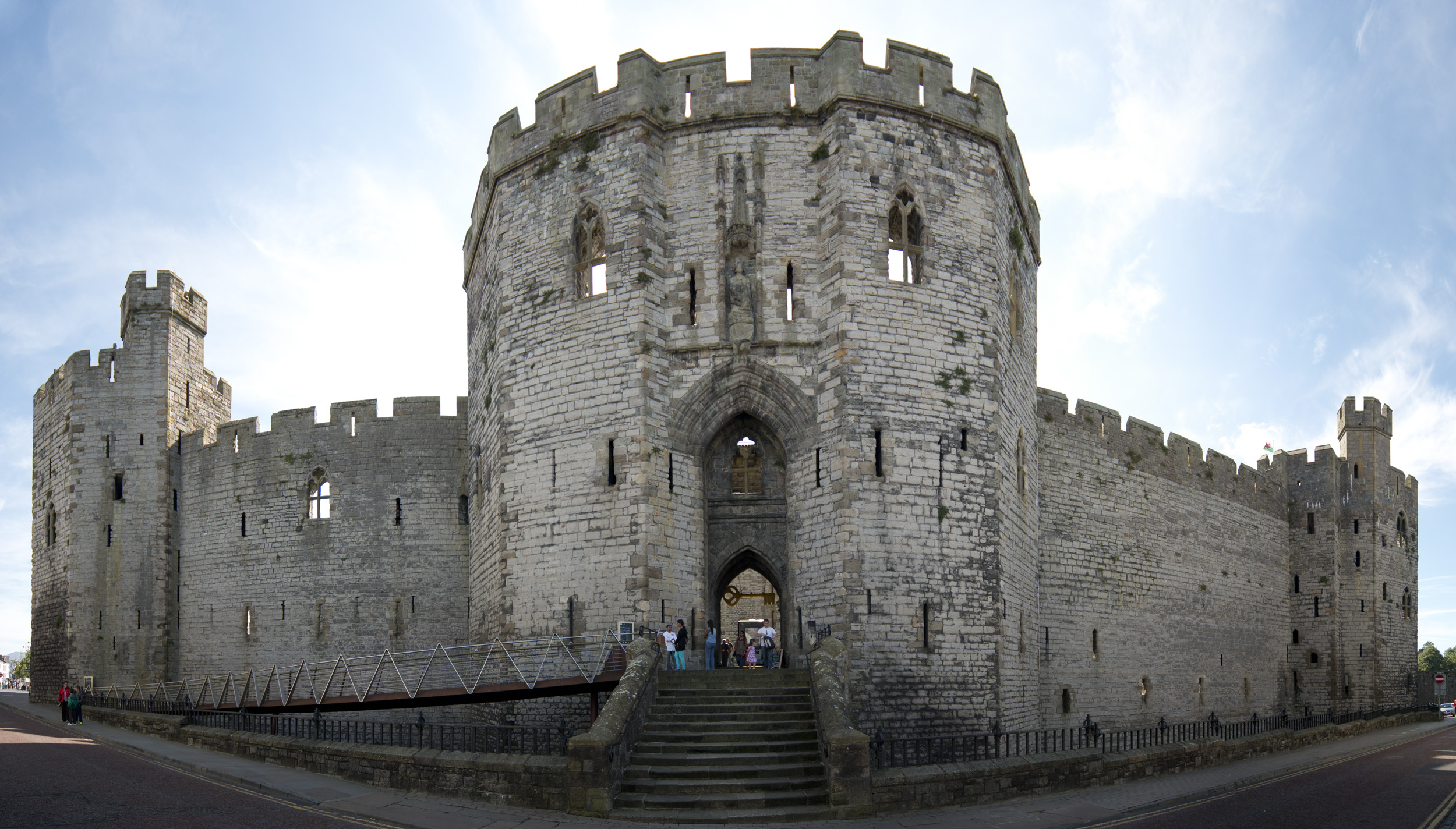
The King's Gate was one of the few areas of the castle which still had a roof by 1620.

In Caernarfon's case the walls of the town and castle remained in good condition, while features which required maintenance—such as roofs—were in a state of decay and much timber was rotten. Conditions were so poor that of the castle's seven towers and two gatehouses, only the Eagle Tower and the King's Gate had roofs by 1620. The domestic buildings inside the castle had been stripped of anything valuable, such as glass and iron. Despite the disrepair of the domestic buildings, the castle's defences were in a good enough state that during the English Civil War in the mid-17th century it was garrisoned by Royalists. Caernarfon Castle was besieged three times during the war. The constable was John Byron, 1st Baron Byron, who surrendered Caernarfon to Parliamentarian forces in 1646. It was the last time Caernarfon Castle saw fighting. Although it was ordered in 1660 that the castle and town walls should be dismantled, the work was aborted early on and may never have started.

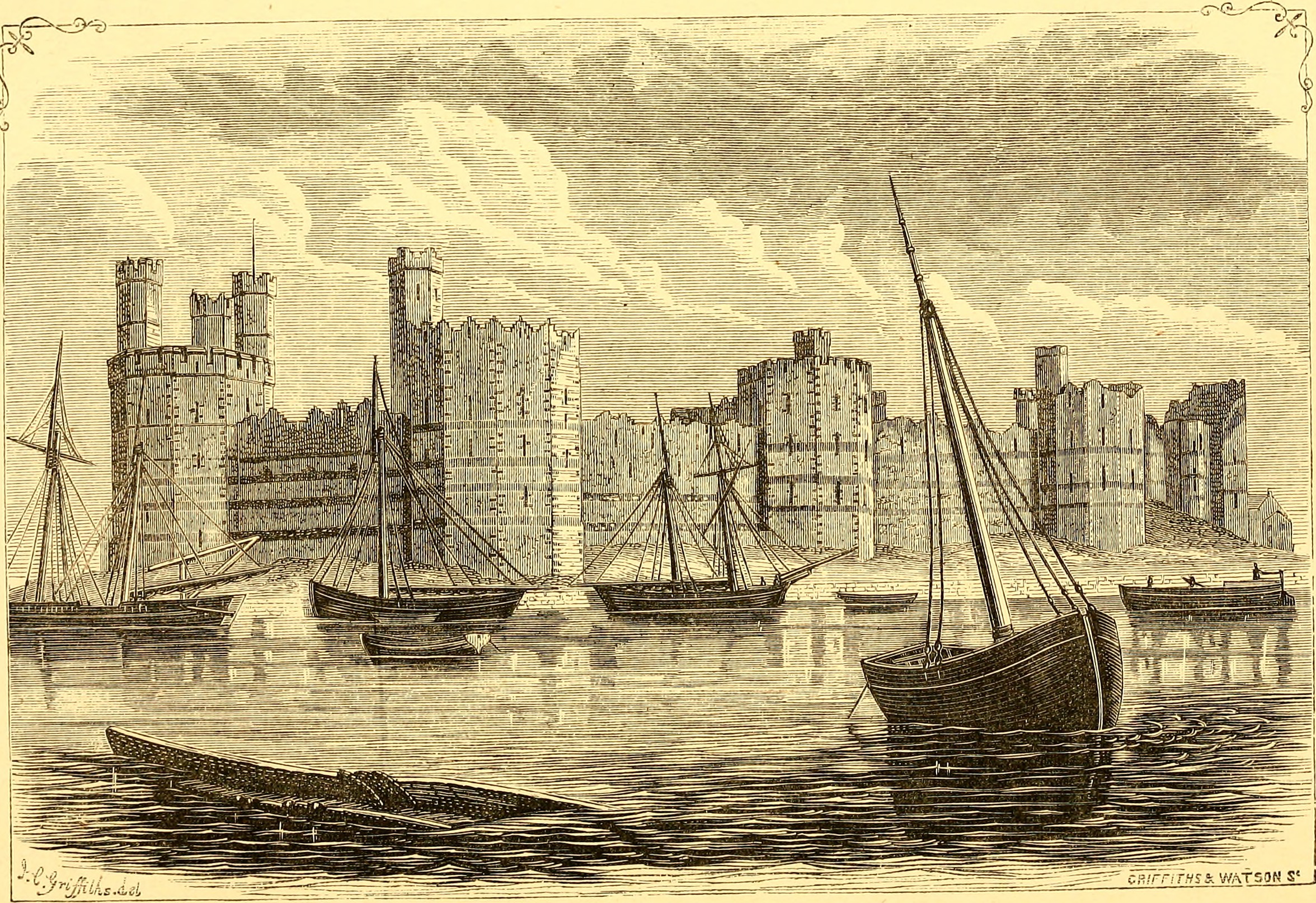
The castle in 1872

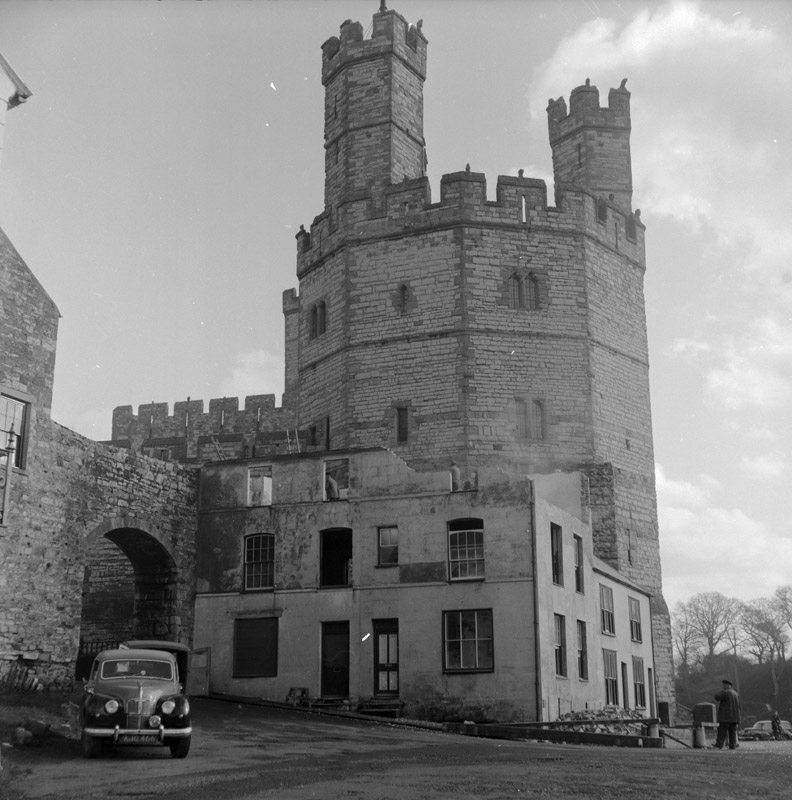
Demolition work in 1959 to clear modern buildings around the Eagle Tower

Despite avoiding slighting, the castle was neglected until the late 19th century. From the 1870s onwards, the government funded repairs to Caernarfon Castle. The deputy-constable Llewellyn Turner oversaw the work, in many cases controversially restoring and rebuilding the castle, rather than simply conserving the existing stonework. Steps, battlements, and roofs were repaired, and the moat to the north of the castle was cleared of post-medieval buildings that were considered to spoil the view, despite the protest of locals. Under the auspices of the Office of Works and its successors since 1908, the castle was preserved due to its historic significance. In 1911, Caernarfon was used for the investiture of the Prince of Wales, for the investiture of Edward, Prince of Wales (later Edward VIII), eldest son of the newly crowned King George V; the ceremony was held there at the insistence of the Chancellor of the Exchequer David Lloyd George, a Welshman raised in Caernarfonshire. In 1969, the precedent was repeated with the Investiture of Charles, Prince of Wales, (who acceded as Charles III in 2022). Although Caernarfon Castle has been the property of the Crown since it was built, it is currently cared for by Cadw (English: to keep), the Welsh Government's historic environment division, responsible for the maintenance and care of Wales' historic buildings. In 1986, Caernarfon was added to the UNESCO list of World Heritage Sites as part of the "Castles and Town Walls of King Edward in Gwynedd" in recognition of its global importance and to help conserve and protect the site. The castle houses the Royal Welch Fusiliers Museum. During 2015 a new "entrance pavilion" was built, designed by architects Donald Insall Associates.

Caernarfon Castle is now a major tourist attraction, with over 155,000 people visiting the attraction in 2024-25. A three-year restoration project, costing £5M and concluding in April 2023, has opened up previously-closed areas of the castle, and enabled wheelchair access to the battlements.

Since 2024, Cadw have used the Welsh name Castell Caernarfon in English, as part of an effort to standardise the names in both languages.

== Architecture ==
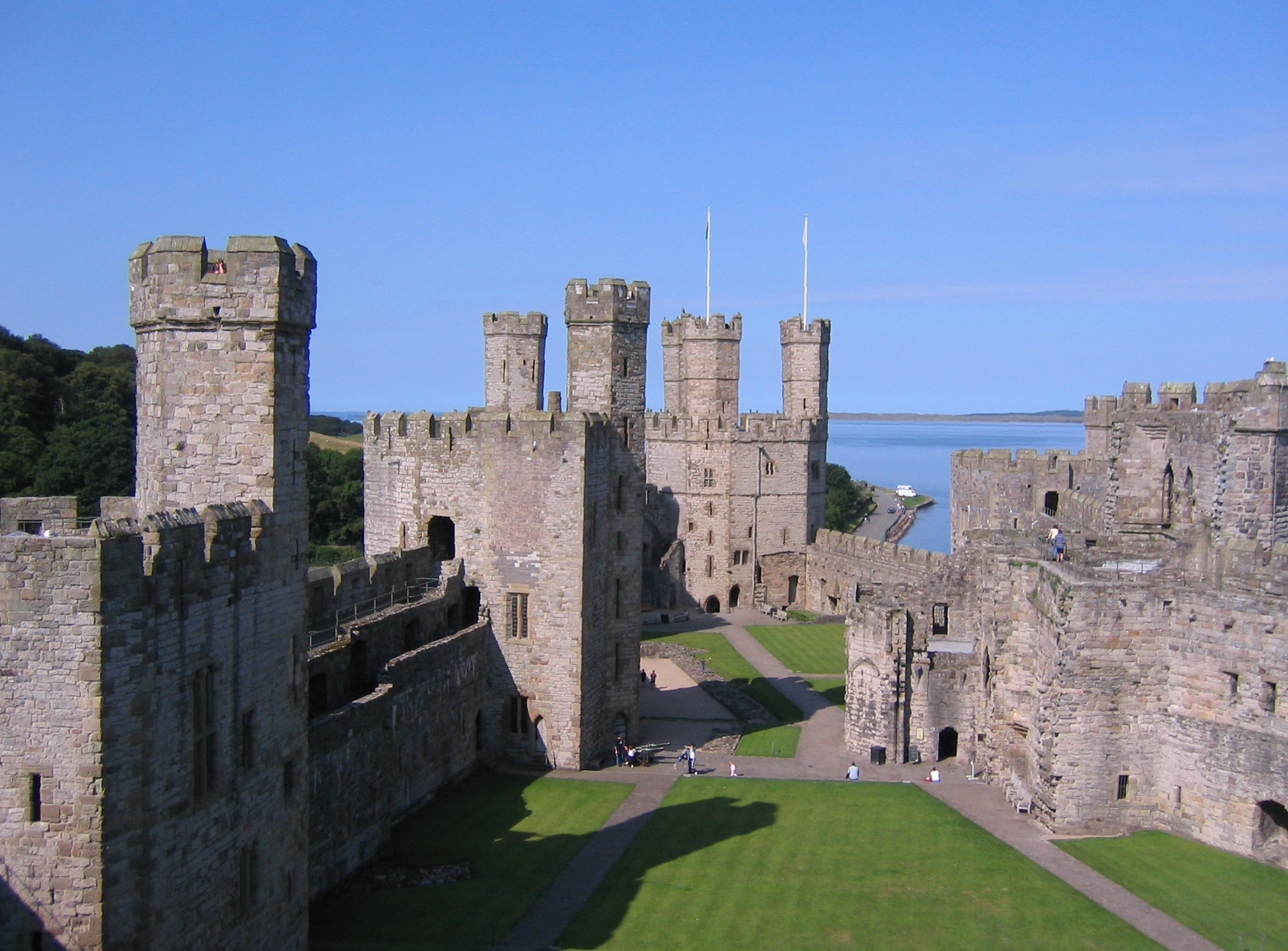
The ward of Caernarfon Castle, showing (from left to right) the Black Tower, the Chamberlain's Tower, and the Eagle Tower. By the 17th century, the castle's domestic buildings had been stripped of valuable materials such as iron and lead.

The architect, Master James of Saint George, was partly influenced by a desire to make the structure impressive as a symbol of the new English rule in Wales. This was particularly acute as Caernarfon was made the centre of government in the northern part of the country. The Edwardian castle's layout was mostly dictated by the lie of the land, although the inclusion of the previous castle's motte played a part. It is a narrow enclosure, roughly in the shape of a figure eight. It was divided into two enclosures, upper and lower "wards", in the east and west respectively, with the eastern containing royal accommodation, although this was never completed. The divide was supposed to be established by a range of fortified buildings, however these too were never built.

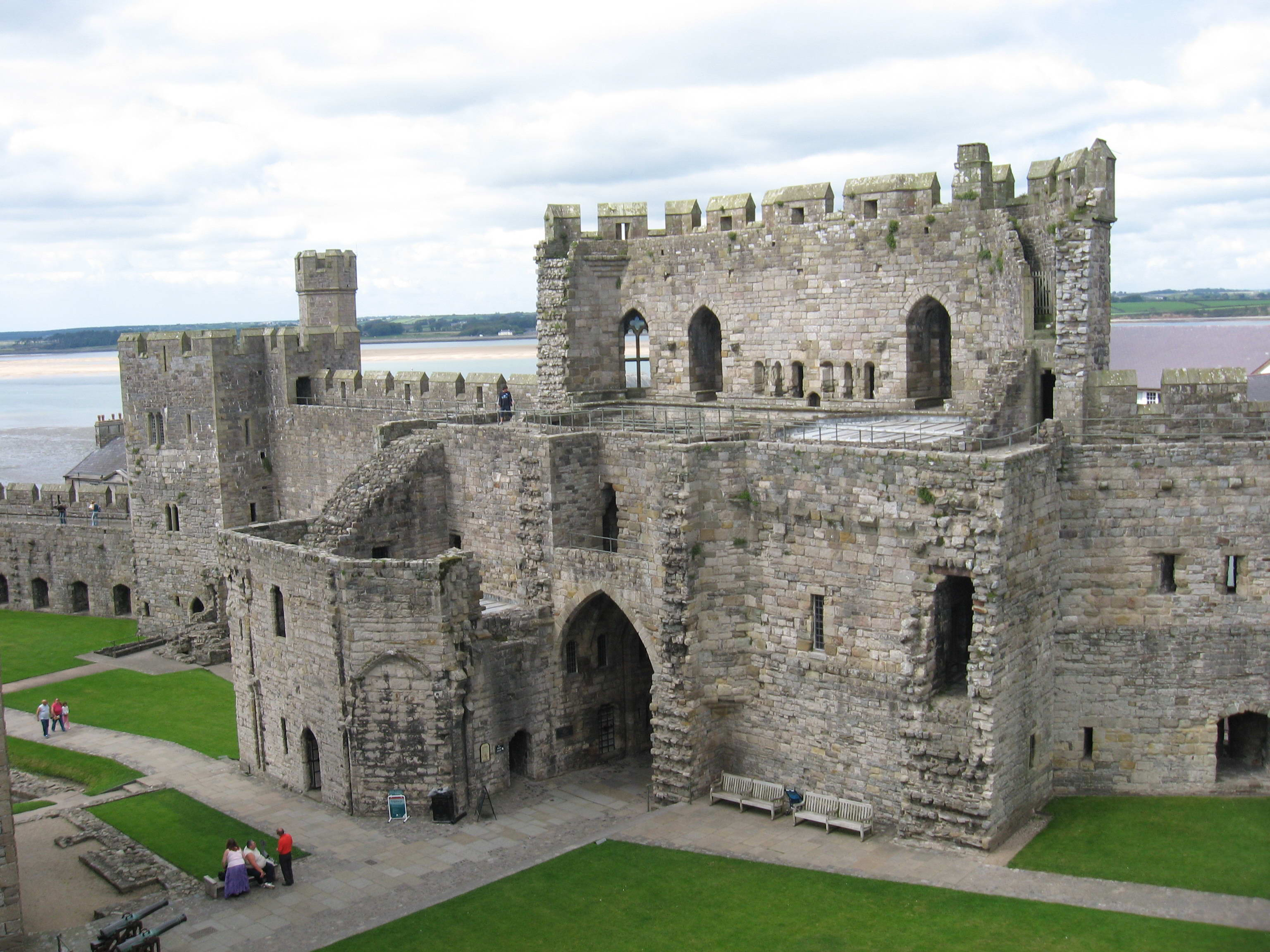
The unfinished rear of the King's Gate, the main entrance to the castle from the town.

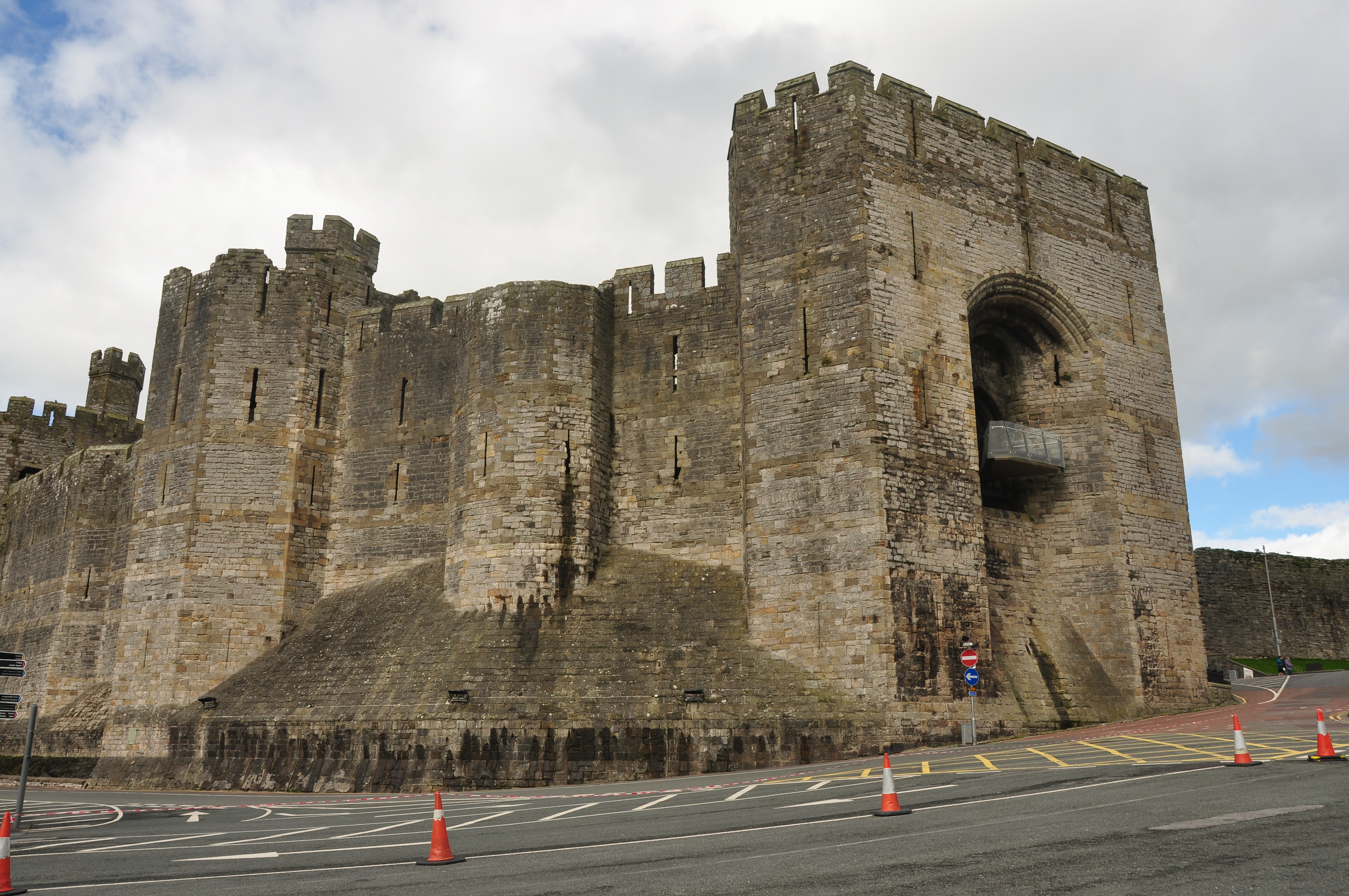
The Queen's Gate

Studded along the curtain wall are several polygonal towers from which flanking fire could be deployed. There were battlements on the tops of walls and towers, and along the southern face were firing galleries; it was intended to include galleries along the northern face but they were never built. In the opinion of military historian Allen Brown, this combined to make Caernarfon Castle "one of the most formidable concentrations of fire-power to be found in the Middle Ages".

Most of the northern towers had four storeys including a basement. The Eagle Tower at the western corner of the castle was the grandest. It has three turrets which were once surmounted by statues of eagles. The tower contained grand lodgings, and was probably built for Sir Otton de Grandson, the first justiciar of Wales. A basement level contained a water gate, through which visitors travelling up the River Seiont could enter the castle. Water was drawn from a well in the eponymous Well Tower.

Caernarfon's appearance differs from that of other Edwardian castles through the use of banded coloured stone in the walls and in its polygonal, rather than round, towers. There has been extensive academic debate over the interpretation of these features. Historian Arnold Taylor argued that the design of the castle was a representation of the Walls of Constantinople. The conscious use of imagery from the Byzantine Roman Empire was therefore an assertion of authority by Edward I, and influenced by Breudwyt Macsen Wledig, the legendary dream of Magnus Maximus, a Roman emperor. In his dream Maximus had seen a fort, "the fairest that man ever saw", within a city at the mouth of a river in a mountainous country and opposite an island. Edward interpreted this to mean Segontium was the city of Maximus' dream and drew on the imperial link when building Caernarfon Castle. The purported discovery of Magnus's remains and the addition of carved imperial eagles to one of the towers may have been intended to reinforce this narrative. Recent work by historian Abigail Wheatley suggests that the design of Caernarfon was indeed an assertion of Edward's authority, but that it drew on imagery from Roman sites in Britain with the intent of creating an allusion to Arthurian legitimacy for the king.

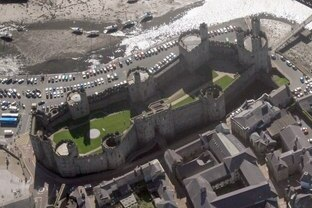
Aerial view of Caernarfon Castle

There were two main entrances, one leading from the town (the King's Gate) and one allowing direct access to the castle without having to proceed through the town (the Queen's Gate). Their form was typical of the time: a passage between two flanking towers. If the King's Gate had been completed, a visitor would have crossed two drawbridges, passed through five doors and under six portcullises, and negotiated a right-angle turn before emerging into the lower enclosure. The route was overlooked by numerous arrow loops and murder holes. A statue of Edward II was erected in a niche overlooking the town, above the entrance to the King's Gate. In the opinion of architectural historian Arnold Taylor, "No building in Britain demonstrates more strikingly the immense strength of medieval fortifications than the great twin-towered gateway to Caernarfon Castle." The Queen's Gate is unusual in that its entrance is above ground level; this was due to the integration of the earlier motte, raising the ground level of the interior. Externally, the gate would have been approached by a stone ramp which is no longer present.

While the curtain wall and its towers survive largely intact, all that remains of the buildings contained within the castle are the foundations. While royal lodgings were in the upper ward, the lower ward contained buildings such as the kitchens. The kitchens were located immediately west of the King's Gate. On the basis of their insubstantial foundations, Taylor suggests that the kitchens were not strongly built. The other key feature of the castle's domestic side was the Great Hall. This abutted the south side of the lower ward and was 30.5 metres (100 ft). Though only the foundations survive, the Great Hall would have been an impressive building, featuring fine architecture, and used to host royal entertainment. Had Caernarfon been completed as intended, it could have contained a royal household of several hundred people.

== Constables of Caernarfon Castle ==
Before 1835 the Constable of the castle served as mayor of Caernarfon. A list of the constables from 1284 to 1835 is thus available at the Caernarfon Royal Town Council site, below.

- 1890–1908: John Henry Puleston
- 1908–1945: David Lloyd George, OM, PC
- 1945–1963: Lord Harlech, KG, GCMG, PC
- 1963–2017: The Earl of Snowdon, GCVO
- 2018–present: Edmund Seymour Bailey, Lord Lieutenant of Gwynedd

== See also ==
- Castles in Great Britain and Ireland
- List of castles in Wales
