= Segontium =

Roman fort in Gwynedd, Wales

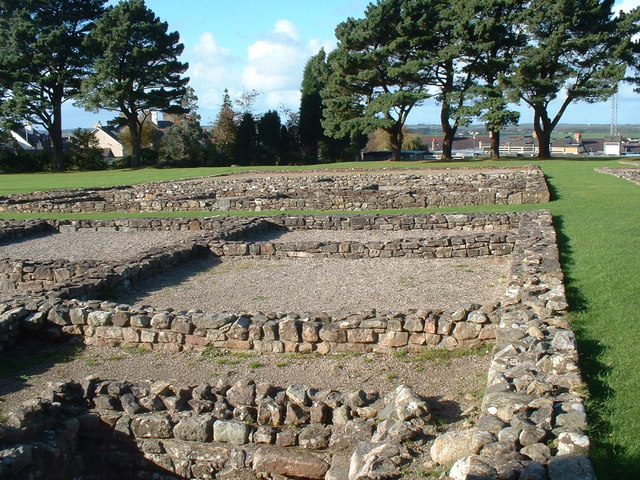

- Location within Gwynedd
- 53.1373°N 4.2659°W
- Location: Caernarfon, Gwynedd, Wales

History
- Founded: CE 77 or 78
- Abandoned: CE 4th century

Site notes
- Website: cadw.gov.wales/daysout/segontiumromanfort/?lang=en

Segontium (Old Welsh: Cair Segeint) is a Roman fort on the outskirts of Caernarfon in Gwynedd, North Wales.

== Etymology ==
The fort probably takes its name either directly from the Afon Seiont or from a pre-existing British settlement itself named for the river. The name is a Latinised form of the Brythonic language *seg-ontio, which may be translated as "strong place".

There is no evidence that the fort is connected to the Segontiaci, a British tribe noted by Julius Caesar.

== History ==
=== Roman ===
Segontium was founded by Agricola in AD 77 or 78 after he had conquered the Ordovices in North Wales. It was the main Roman fort in the north of Roman Wales and was designed to hold about a thousand auxiliary infantry. It was connected by a Roman road to the Roman legionary base at Chester, Deva Victrix. Unlike the medieval Caernarfon Castle that was built alongside the Seiont estuary more than a thousand years later, Segontium was situated on higher ground to the east giving a good view of the Menai Strait.

The original timber defences were rebuilt in stone in the first half of the 2nd century. In the same period, a large courtyard house (with its own small bathhouse) was built within the fort. The high-status building may have been the residence of an important official who was possibly in charge of regional mineral extraction. Archaeological research shows that, by the year 120, there had been a reduction in the military numbers at the fort. An inscription on an aqueduct from the time of the Emperor Septimius Severus indicates that, by the 3rd century, Segontium was garrisoned by 500 men from the Cohors I Sunicorum, which would have originally been levied among the Sunici of Gallia Belgica. The size of the fort continued to reduce through the 3rd and 4th centuries. At this time Segontium's main role was the defence of the north Wales coast against Irish raiders and pirates. Coins found at Segontium show the fort was still occupied until at least 394.

=== Medieval ===
Segontium is generally considered to have been listed among the 28 cities of Britain listed in the History of the Britons traditionally ascribed to Nennius, either as Cair Segeint or Cair Custoeint. Bishop Ussher cites another passage in Nennius: "Here, says Nennius, Constantius the Emperor (the father probably of Constantine the Great) died; that is, near the town of Cair Segeint, or Custoient, in Carnarvonshire". Nennius stated that the emperor's inscribed tomb was still present in his day. Constantius Chlorus actually died at York; the Welsh monument might be for Constantine who was the son of Saint Elen, the supposed patron of the Sarn Helen.

In the 11th century, the Normans built a motte nearby, whose settlement formed the nucleus of present-day Caernarfon. Following the 13th-century Edwardian conquest, the earlier work was replaced by Caernarfon Castle.

=== Present day ===
Although the A4085 to Beddgelert cuts through the site, most of the fort's foundations are preserved. Guidebooks can be bought from other Cadw sites, including Caernarfon Castle. The remains of a civilian settlement together with a Roman temple of Mithras, the Caernarfon Mithraeum, and a cemetery have been also identified around the fort.

== Mythology and fiction ==
Segontium is referenced in the prose of the Mabinogion, a collection of early medieval Welsh prose first collated in the 1350s. In Breuddwyd Macsen Wledig ("The dream of Macsen Wledig")—one of its Four Independent Tales—Macsen (identified with the Emperor Magnus Maximus) dreams of a beautiful woman (Saint Elen) who turns out to be at "the fort at the mouth of the Seiont".

It is also suggested as the location of Snowdon/Synadowne in the Libeaus Desconus.

Wallace Breem's novel Eagle in the Snow begins and ends in post-Roman Segontium and references its temple of Mithras.

The fort also features in The Crystal Cave and The Hollow Hills of Mary Stewart's Merlin trilogy.

== Gallery ==
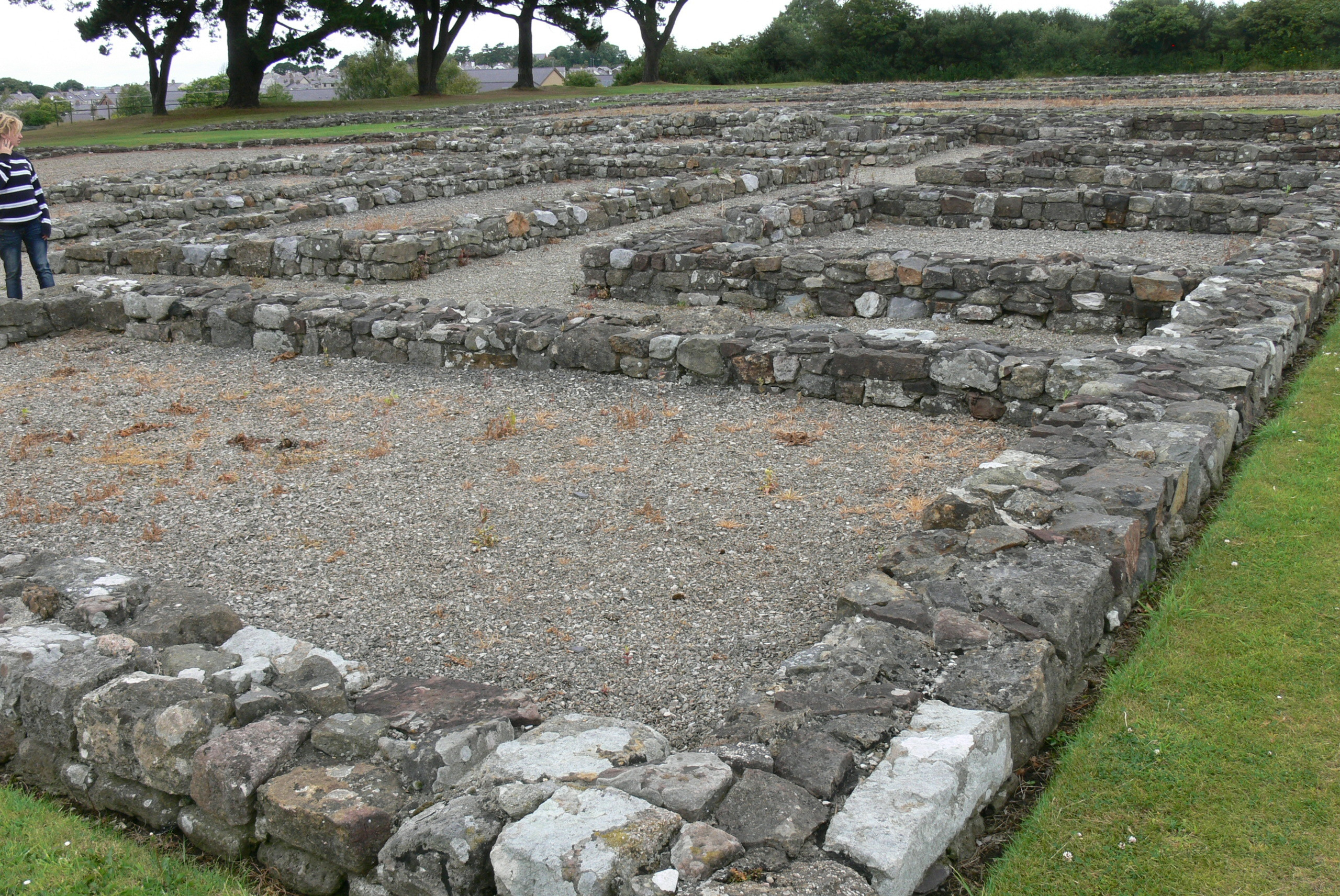
Foundations of the commander's house

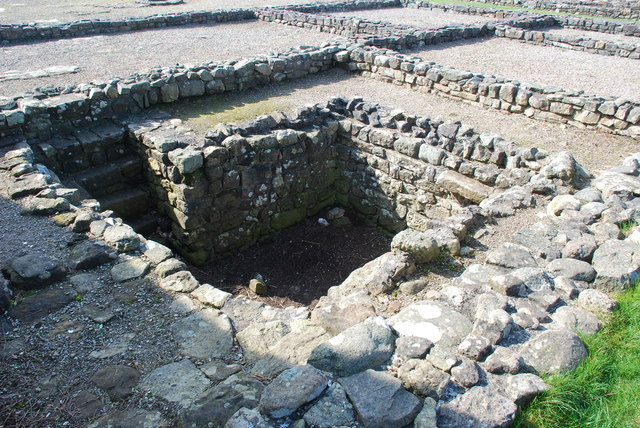
Basement strongroom

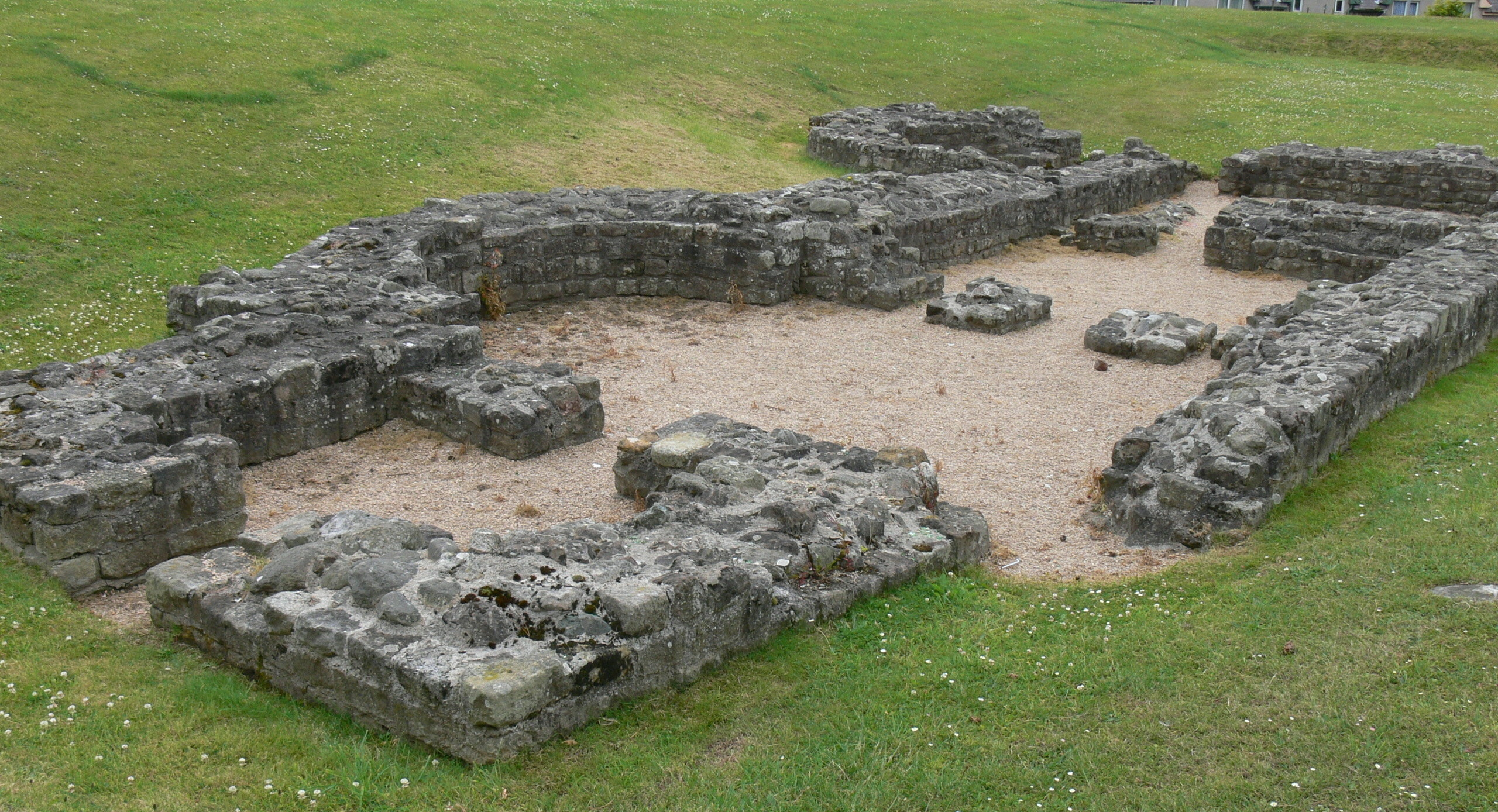
Remains of bath house

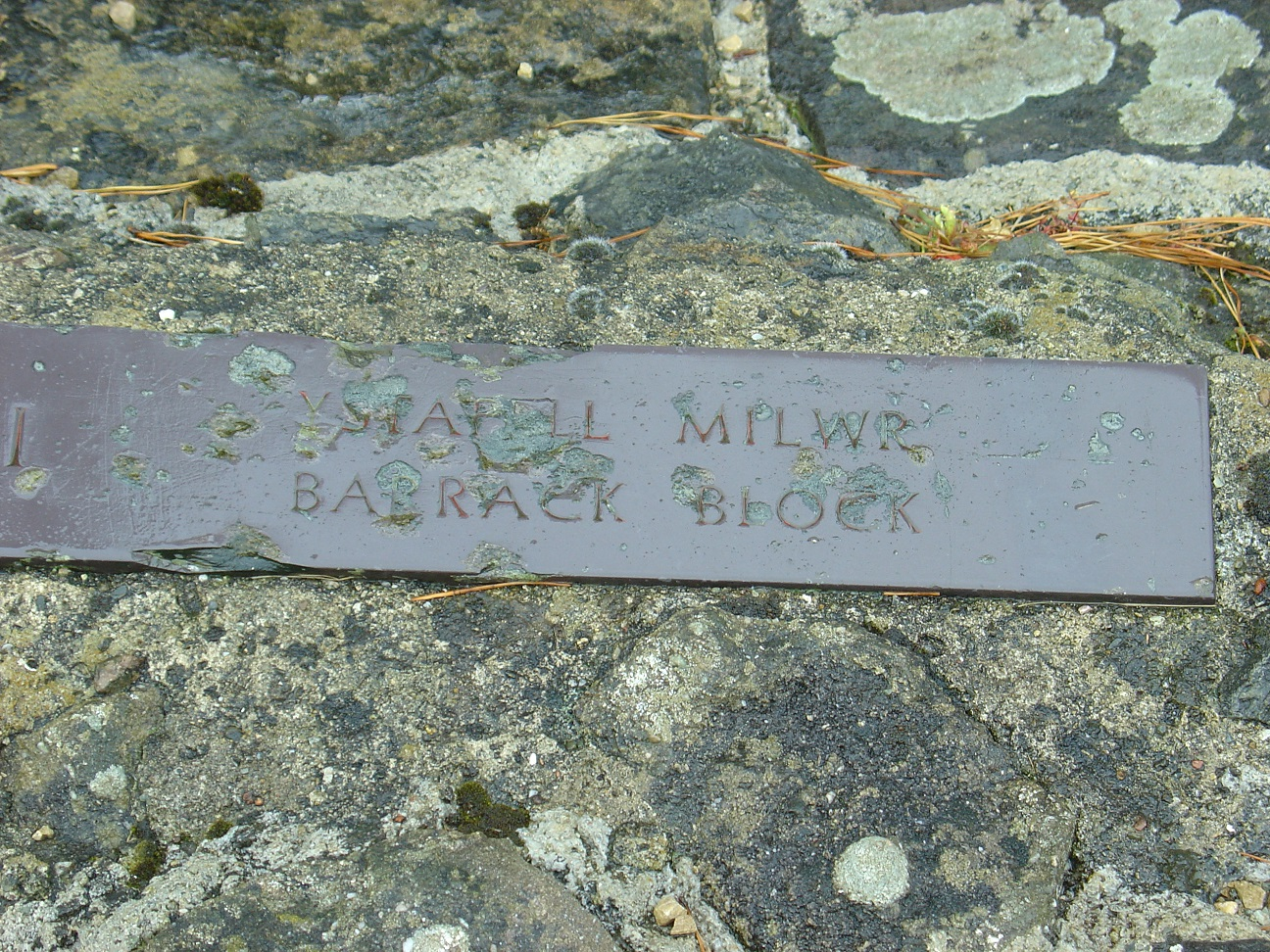
Plaque marking barrack block

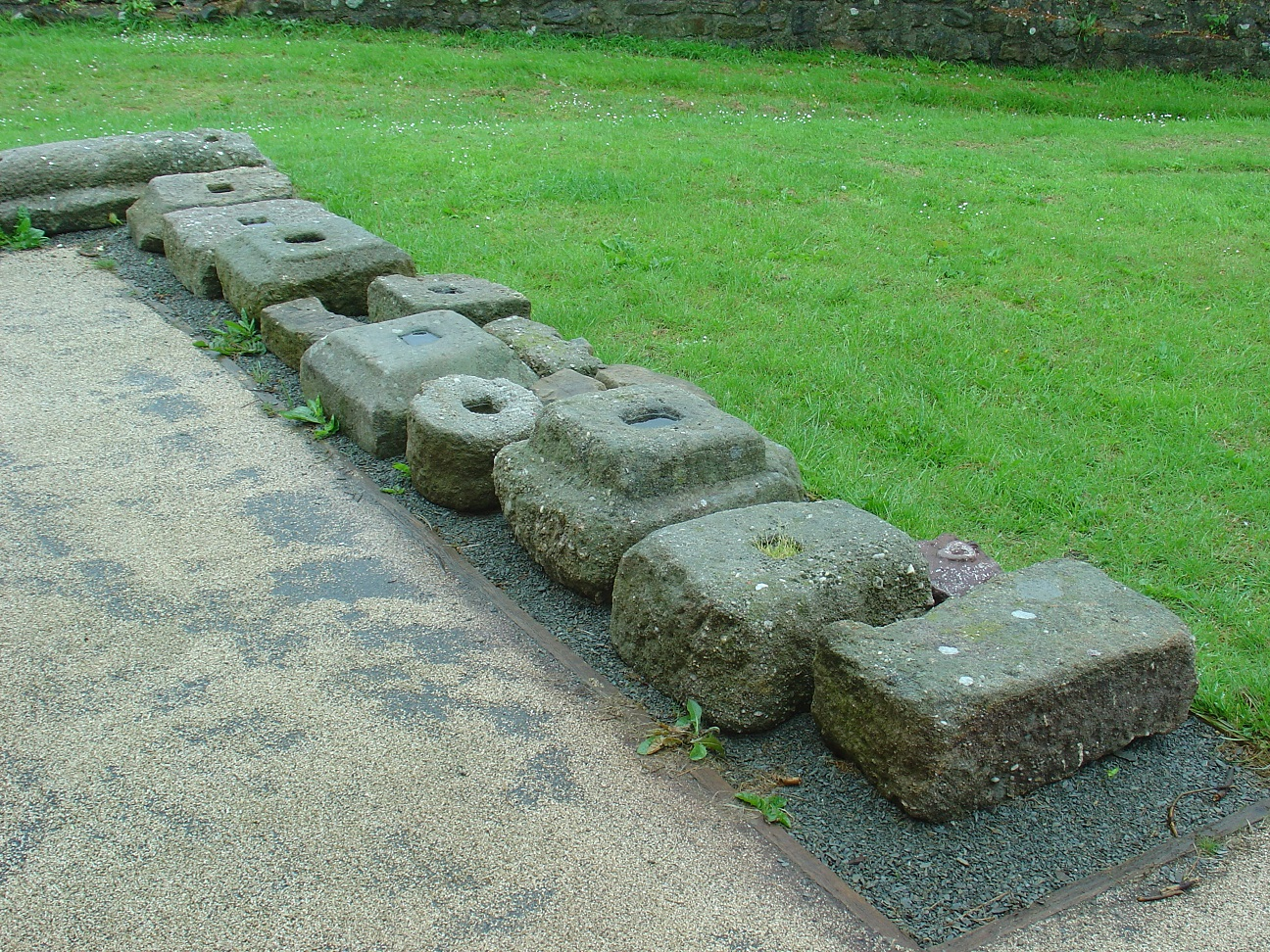
Building components unearthed on site

== See also ==
- Caer Gybi at Holyhead—established in the 4th century to support Segontium against Irish raiders.
- Pen-y-Gwryd - a waypoint between the legionary fortress of Deva Victrix (Chester) and Segontium.
