= Andragathius =

Roman army officer

Andragathius was a magister militum of Roman emperor Magnus Maximus, responsible for the death of the rival emperor Gratian.

In 383, after several days of skirmishing near Paris, Gratian's army defected to Maximus. Gratian fled, with Andragathius in pursuit. In order to lure the fugitive back, Andragathius traveled in a closed, mule-borne litter, and had his guards send out a report that the vehicle was occupied by Gratian's wife. Gratian met the litter between Lyon and Grenoble and Andragathius killed him.

In 388, Maximus learned that Justina, mother of Valentinian II, was crossing the Ionian Sea with her children, and sent Andragathius to intercept her. Eluding the fast ships which Andragathius had sent in every direction, Justina's party completed its journey in safety. Andragathius then brought together a competent navy which sailed the adjacent coasts, in anticipation of an attack by Theodosius I. No attack came, as Theodosius concentrated his forces on land and defeated Maximus near Aquileia. Andragathius then threw himself into the ocean.

Some researchers have identified Andragathius as the inspiration for the legend of King Arthur conquering Europe. The theory is based on the reasoning that, just like the legendary Arthur, Andragathius was a military commander who led a large army from Britain to Gaul and fought against the Romans. His swift defeat of Gratian reflects Arthur’s swift overthrow of Frollo, the Roman leader of Gaul in the Arthurian legend. And like Arthur, Andragathius’ army ended up facing a large coalition of Roman and barbarian forces several years later. The name of this historical battle site, Siscia, may have evolved into the Arthurian Siesia, the site of Arthur’s final battle against the Romans and their allied barbarian forces. However, this theory has not yet received any wide support.
