= Gurthiern =

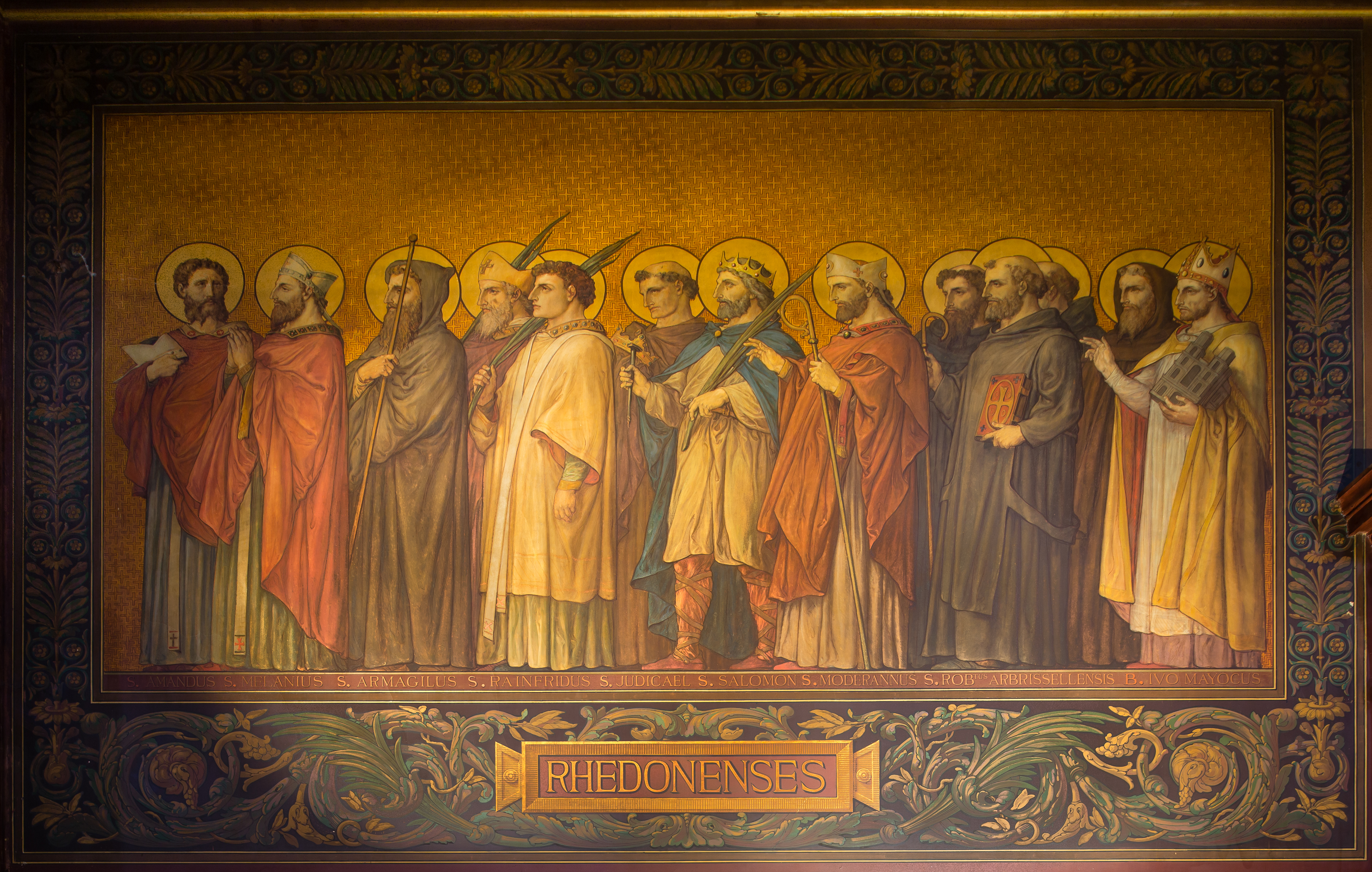
Procession of the Saints of Britain - Diocese of Rennes, Rennes Cathedral

Gurthiern (also Guthiern, Gunthiern, and Gunthiernus) was a Welsh prince. According to the Vita sancta Gurthierni, he became a hermit in Brittany and founder of an abbey at Quimperlé. He is a Catholic and Orthodox saint with a feast day on 3 July.
