= List of legendary rulers of Cornwall =

"Duke of Cornwall" appears as a title in pseudo-historical authors such as Geoffrey of Monmouth. The list is patchy and not every succession was unbroken. Indeed, Geoffrey repeatedly introduces Dukes of Cornwall only to promote them to the Kingship of the Britons and thus put an end to their line as (merely) dukes. As adjuncts or supporting roles to the kings of the Britons, the legendary dukes of Cornwall are considered part of the vast Matter of Britain, and can also be found in other stories, such as Culhwch and Olwen, the Prose Tristan, Havelok the Dane, and Gesta Herewardi. Antiquaries such as Richard Carew (Survey of Cornwall, 1602) and John Williams (the Book of Baglan, 1600–1607) also provide lists of legendary rulers of Cornwall, often combining the above with other sources.

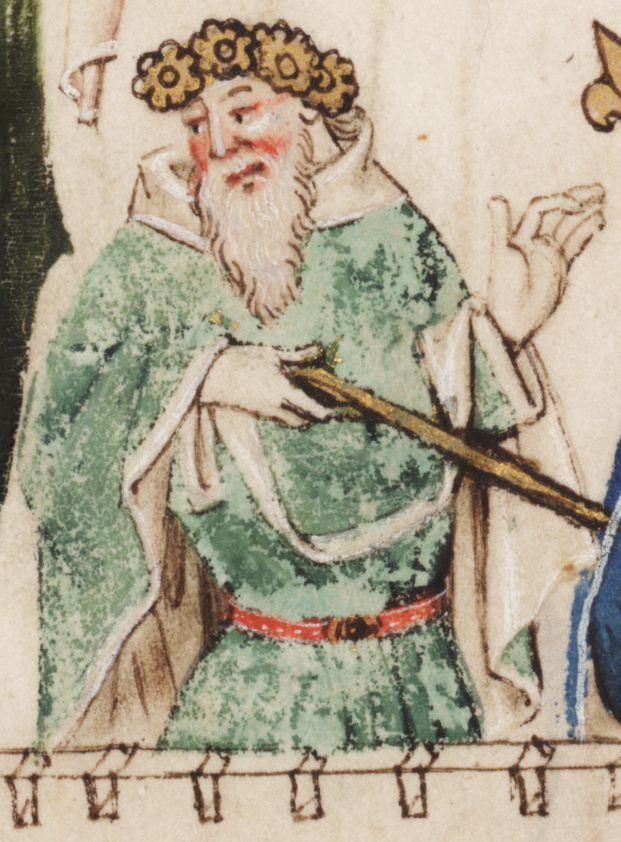
An archetypal Duke of Cornwall from the late fifteenth century Chronicle of the History of the World

As a result, these lists are more often thought of as a conglomeration of various Celtic rulers, Celtic warlords, and mythical heroes. If the lists of kings of Britain are legendary, then the list of dukes must be considered still more a genealogical and historical legend with no solid basis in the view of most historians. The titles given for the rulers also vary, even within sources; Geoffrey's History, has the title fluctuating between "duke" (dux Cornubiae) and "king" (rex Cornubiae), and Carew wrote that before the Norman Conquest "these titles of honour carry a kinde of confusednes, and rather betokened a successive office, then an established dignity. The following ages received a more distinct forme, and left us a certeyner notice."

== Pre-Arthurian ==
Name	Title	Notes	Approximate time frame	Sources
Corineus	Duke (Note: Survey of Cornwall)	First ruler of Cornwall; given the land by Brutus (Note: Historia Regum Britanniae)	1154 BC	Historia Regum Britanniae; Survey of Cornwall
Gwendolen	Queen	Daughter of Corineus; became queen regnant of Britain		Historia Regum Britanniae
Gorbonian	Duke	Son of Camber; also became chief governor of Cambria (Note: Book of Baglan)		Book of Baglan folios 84, 305
Difnwall Hen	Duke	Son of Gorbonian; also one of or the chief governor of Cambria		Book of Baglan folios 84, 306
Kingen	Duke	Son of Difnwall Hen; also chief governor of Cambria		Book of Baglan folios 84, 306
Aser	Duke	Son of Kingen; also chief governor of Cambria		Book of Baglan folios 84, 306
Bledhud	Duke	Son of Aser; also chief governor of Cambria		Book of Baglan folios 84, 306
Henwin	Duke	Son of Bledhud; also chief governor of Cambria; Duke under King Leir; husband of Leir's daughter Regan or Gonorille, and with her ruled half of Britain	899 BC	Historia Regum Britanniae; Survey of Cornwall; Book of Baglan folios 84, 306
Cunedagius	Duke	Son of Henwin; duke of Cornwall under Queen Cordelia; became king of Britain; built a temple to Apollo in Cornwall	832 BC	Historia Regum Britanniae; Survey of Cornwall
Antonius	Duke	Great-great-grandson of Henwin; second son of Gorwst, king of Britain		Book of Baglan folios 83, 306
Aedhmawr	Duke	Son of Antonius		Book of Baglan folios 83, 306, 307
Prydan	Duke	Son of Aedhmawr		Book of Baglan folios 83, 307
Kynfarch	Duke	Son of Prydan		Book of Baglan folios 83, 307
Cloten	King/Duke/Prince	Son of Kynfarch; ruled Cornwall during the pentarchy after Ferrex and Porrex	528 BC	Historia Regum Britanniae; Survey of Cornwall; Book of Baglan folios 83, 165, 307; Gorboduc
Dyfnwal Moelmud	King/Duke	Son of Cloten; unites Britain as its king	c. 400 BC	Historia Regum Britanniae; Survey of Cornwall; Book of Baglan folios 83, 165, 307
Belinus		Son of Dyfnwal Moelmud; became king of Britain, and direct ruler of Loegria, Kambria, and Cornwall, as his appanage; brother of Brennus	430 BC	Historia Regum Britanniae; Survey of Cornwall
Tasciovanus	Duke	Son of King Lud; made duke by his uncle King Cassibelanus; succeeds him as king of Britain	96 BC	Historia Regum Britanniae; Survey of Cornwall
Thanor	King	Contemporary with Joseph of Arimathea (Note: Prose Tristan)	c. 1st century AD	Prose Tristan
Asclepiodotus	Duke	Duke under Allectus; becomes king of Britain	231 AD	Historia Regum Britanniae; Survey of Cornwall
Conan Meriadoc	Duke	Nephew of Octavius; became king of Armorica	329 AD	Survey of Cornwall
Salomon	Duke	Father of Corinius who was said to have attended the Synod of Arles	351 AD	Survey of Cornwall

== Arthurian ==
Sources diverge leading up to the time of King Arthur, with Caradoc placed either during the time of Arthur (as in the Welsh Triads, and later tradition), soon before Gorlois (Carew's Survey of Cornwall), or before his brother Dionotus as Caradocus in the Historia Regum Britanniae, while the Book of Baglan only keeps Gorlois, but gives him an entirely different set of ancestors. Gorlois is sometimes given other names, such as Ricca in Culhwch and Olwen, Tador in William Worcester's Itineraries, and Hoel in the Prose Merlin. In some sources Gorlois is not ruler of Cornwall, and is replaced in this role by Mark in the Prose Tristan, Ydiers in the Prose Merlin, and the unnamed King Cornwall in "King Arthur and King Cornwall".

=== Welsh Triads ===
Name	Title	Notes	Approximate time frame	Sources
Arthur	Chief lord	Chief lord of the "three tribal thrones of the Island of Prydain": Celliwig in Cornwall, Pen Rhionydd in the north, and Mynyw in Wales		Peniarth MS 54, triad 1
Caradawg Vreichvras	Chief elder	Arthur's chief elder for Cornwall; also one of the "three cavaliers of battle of the Island of Prydain"		Peniarth MS 54, triads 1, 16

=== Historia Regum Britanniae ===
Name	Title	Notes	Approximate time frame	Sources
Caradocus	Duke/King	Duke under King Octavius; put forward Maximianus as king of Britain and was king of Cornwall under him		Historia Regum Britanniae
Dionotus	King	Brother of Caradocus; made regent of Britain during Maximianus' campaigns		Historia Regum Britanniae
Gorlois	Duke	Duke under kings Aurelius Ambrosius and Uther; first husband of Igraine, Arthur's mother		Historia Regum Britanniae
Cador	Duke/King	Ruler of Cornwall as one of four kings under King Arthur		Historia Regum Britanniae
Constantine		Son of Cador; kinsman of King Arthur, who he succeeds as king of Britain	542 AD	Historia Regum Britanniae

=== Survey of Cornwall ===
Name	Title	Notes	Approximate time frame	Sources
Dionethus	Duke/King	Sent Saint Ursula and 11,000 handmaids to Conan Meridock in Armorica; also called Dionotus	383 AD	Survey of Cornwall
Moigne	Duke	Brother of Aurelius and Uter-Pendragon; governor of the realm under Emperor Honorius	433 AD	Survey of Cornwall
Carodoc	Duke	Tasked by Octavius to found the University of Cambridge	443 AD	Survey of Cornwall
Gorlois	Duke	Husband of Igerna with whom Uter-Pendragon had Arthur and Amy	500 AD	Survey of Cornwall
Cador	Earl	Killed King Childerick of the Saxons who invaded after being banished by Arthur	526 AD	Survey of Cornwall
Marke	King	In the time of Arthur		Survey of Cornwall

=== Book of Baglan ===
Name	Title	Notes	Approximate time frame	Sources
Owen	Duke	Direct descendant of Dyfnwall Moelmud; son of Maxentius, king of Britain and emperor of Rome	c. 4th century AD	Book of Baglan folios 82, 276, 309
Moure	Duke	Son of Owen; also called Mour or Moor		Book of Baglan folios 82, 276, 309
Golor	Duke	Son of Moure; also called Solor		Book of Baglan folios 82, 276, 309
Pendoff the Great	Duke	Son of Golor; also duke of Wessex; also called Pendof or Pendaff the Great		Book of Baglan folios 81, 276, 309
Sortogus	Duke	Son of Pendoff		Book of Baglan folios 81, 276, 309
Gurleis	Duke/Prince	Son of Sortogus; married Eigyr, a descendant of Joseph of Arimathea's sister; also called Goulisor or Gwrleis		Book of Baglan folios 81, 276, 309
Cador	Duke/Prince	Son of Gurleis		Book of Baglan folios 81, 276

=== Culhwch and Olwen ===
Name	Title	Notes	Approximate time frame	Sources
Arthur		Has his court at Celliwig in Cornwall	c. 6th century AD	Culhwch and Olwen
Ricca	Chief Elder	Father of Arthur's half-brother Gormant	c. 6th century AD	Culhwch and Olwen
Gwyn Hywar	Overseer	Overseer or steward of Cornwall and Devon; one of the nine who plotted the Battle of Camlann	c. 6th century AD	Culhwch and Olwen

=== William Worcester's Itineraries ===
Name	Title	Notes	Approximate time frame	Sources
Tador	Duke	Husband of Arthur's mother; killed at Castle an Dinas		William Worcester's Itineraries, 1478, Castle an Dinas

=== Prose Tristan ===
Name	Title	Notes	Approximate time frame	Sources
Felix	King	Many generations after Thanor	c. late 5th century AD	Prose Tristan
Mark of Cornwall	King	Son of Felix, and uncle of Tristan	c. early 6th century AD	Prose Tristan

=== "King Arthur and King Cornwall" ===
Name	Title	Notes	Approximate time frame	Sources
King Cornwall	King	Unnamed magician-king of Cornwall; fathered a daughter with Guinevere; beheaded by King Arthur		"King Arthur and King Cornwall"

=== Prose Merlin ===
Name	Title	Notes	Approximate time frame	Sources
Hoel	Duke	Duke of Tintagel, husband of Ygerne; had five daughters with her, who married King Lot, King Ventres, King Urien, and King Briadas		Prose Merlin
Ydiers	King	King of Cornwall; one of seven kings who fight Arthur; joins forces with Arthur during the Saxon invasion		Prose Merlin

== Post-Arthurian ==
=== Historia Regum Britanniae ===
Name	Title	Notes	Approximate time frame	Sources
Blederic	Duke	Duke at the time Augustine arrives; dies leading the Britons in war against the Saxon King Ethelfrid of Northumbria	597 AD	Historia Regum Britanniae

=== Survey of Cornwall ===
Name	Title	Notes	Approximate time frame	Sources
Blederic	Duke	Fought with other Welsh kings against Ethelferd, and by dying won the battle	603 AD	Survey of Cornwall
Ivor		Son of King Alane of Brittany; won Cornwall, Devon, and Somerset from the Saxons	688 AD	Survey of Cornwall
Roderic	King	King of the Bretons in Wales and Cornwall; lost Cornwall to King Adelred of Wessex and fled to Wales	720 AD	Survey of Cornwall
Bletius	Prince	Prince of Cornwall and Devon under King Roderic	720 AD	Survey of Cornwall
Dungarth	King	Drowned by mischance	872 AD	Survey of Cornwall
Alpsius	Duke	Duke of Devon and Cornwall	900 AD	Survey of Cornwall
Orgerius	Duke	Father of Alfride who married King Edgar	959 AD	Survey of Cornwall
Condor	Earl	Paid homage to William the Conqueror for his earldom	1067 AD	Survey of Cornwall

=== Book of Baglan ===
Name	Title	Notes	Approximate time frame	Sources
Bredrice	Duke	Grandson of Cador; son of Constantyn III the king of Britain; also called Peledric	c. 6th century AD	Book of Baglan folios 81, 276
Clement	Duke/Prince	Son of Bredrice; also called Clemeas		Book of Baglan folios 81, 276
Pedrock	Duke	Son of Clement; also called Pedronck		Book of Baglan folios 81, 276
Progmaell	Duke	Son of Pedrock		Book of Baglan folios 81, 276
Coilbye	Duke	Son of Progmaell; also called Koilbie		Book of Baglan folios 81, 276
Caret	Duke	Son of Coilbye; also called Garet		Book of Baglan folios 81, 276
Dwn	Duke	Son of Caret		Book of Baglan folios 81, 276
Ithel	Duke	Son of Dwn; also called Ithyn		Book of Baglan folios 81, 276
Dyfnuall	Duke	Son of Ithel; also called Boifunall		Book of Baglan folios 81, 276
Canordolye	Duke	Son of Dyfnuall; also called Canordoly		Book of Baglan folios 81, 276
Ostwallt	Duke	Son of Canordolye; also called Ustwalld		Book of Baglan folios 81, 276
Hernam	Duke	Son of Ostwallt		Book of Baglan folios 81, 276
Hopkin	Duke	Son of Hernam; also called Hopkyn		Book of Baglan folios 81, 276
Mordaph	Duke	Son of Hopkin; also called Mordaff		Book of Baglan folios 81, 276
Fferverdyn	Duke	Son of Mordaph		Book of Baglan folios 81, 276
Elnyd	Duke	Son of Fferverdyn		Book of Baglan folios 81, 276
Alanor	Duke	Son of Elnyd		Book of Baglan folios 81, 276
Rolopedaph	Duke	Son of Alanor		Book of Baglan folios 81, 276
Vortegyn	Duke	Son of Rolopedaph; also duke of Wessex		Book of Baglan folios 81, 276
Vephyne	Duke	Son of Vortegyn; also duke of Wessex		Book of Baglan folios 81, 276
Alured	Duke	Son of Vephyne; also duke of Wessex		Book of Baglan folios 81, 276
Godwyn	Duke	Son of Alured; also duke of Wessex	Died 1013	Book of Baglan folios 39, 81, 276, 327, 373
Herbert	Lord/Earl	Son of Godwyn; also duke of Wessex; father of Henry Herbert Lord of the Forest of Deane and Chamberlain to Henry I of England		Book of Baglan folios xxiii, xxiv, 39, 81
Candor	Earl	Paid homage to William the Conqueror	Earl in 1066	Book of Baglan folio 196
Candor	Earl	Son of Candor; father of Avicia who married Reginald de Dunstanville, 1st Earl of Cornwall		Book of Baglan folio 196

=== Havelok the Dane ===
Name	Title	Notes	Approximate time frame	Sources
Godrich	Earl	Earl under King Athelwold; made regent of England	c. 6th/7th century AD	Havelok the Dane
Bertram	Earl	Godrich's cook; made earl by Havelok	c. late 6th/7th century AD	Havelok the Dane

=== Gesta Herewardi ===
Name	Title	Notes	Approximate time frame	Sources
Alef	Prince/King	Gave shelter to Hereward the Wake during his first exile	c. 1050s/1060s AD	Gesta Herewardi

== See also ==
- Earl of Cornwall
- Duke of Cornwall
- List of legendary kings of Britain
- List of kings in Wales from the Matter of Britain
- List of kings of Dumnonia
- Dumnonia
- History of Cornwall
- Cornovii (Cornish)
