= Caradocus =

Legendary British king

Caradocus (middle Welsh: Karadawc), according to Geoffrey of Monmouth's Historia regum Britanniae, a pseudohistorical account of the kings of the Britons, was the duke of Cornwall under the reign of Octavius, who became king of Cornwall and died during the Emperor Magnus Maximus' reign.

Caradocus was the Duke of Cornwall during the reign of Octavius. It was he who suggested to Octavius that he should wed his daughter to Maximus and unite Britain with Rome through that union. When Octavius agreed to the idea, Caradocus sent out his son, Mauricius, to Rome as to deliver the message to Maximus. Conan Meriadoc, the king's nephew, did not approve and nearly attacked Maximus when he landed near Southampton. Only when Caradocus arrived was peace restored. They dispersed and Octavius handed Maximus the kingship and retired, as Caradocus rallied behind Maximus.

Five years after Maximus became king of Britain, he left the country to ravage the land of Gaul, and Geoffrey of Monmouth says that Maximus had left governance of his kingdom to Caradocus' brother, Dionotus, whom he calls the king of Cornwall, "who had succeeded his brother Caradoc in that kingdom." Geoffrey of Monmouth varies his use of the terms dux ('duke') and rex ('king') of Cornwall, even for the same person (for example, Cador), but his account consistently presents Caradocus as ruler of Cornwall under first Octavius and then Maximus, dying within the first five years of the latter's reign.

Cornish antiquary Richard Carew has Caradocus as Carodoc Duke of Cornwall, and gives an earlier source (D. Kay) who says that he was tasked by Octavius to found the University of Cambridge in 443. Carew has him succeeded by Gorlois in 500.

Welsh Triads mention Caradoc (Welsh: Caradawg Vreichvras) as King Arthur's chief elder at Celliwig in Cornwall, who may have served as Geoffrey's source for Caradocus.

Legendary titles
Unknown Last known title holder: Asclepiodotus as duke	King of Cornwall	Succeeded by Dionotus
