= Meirchion =

Meirchion was the father of King Mark of Cornwall, famous for his role in the story of Tristan and Iseult. He is thus assumed to have been an ancient king of Cornwall who reigned in the late 5th century, however the name of Mark's father derives from Old Welsh sources in which Mark is associated with Wales rather than the West Country. The period was one of British migration away from attacks from the east and north, which may account for these different associations.
