= Dionotus =

Legendary king of Cornwall and father of Saint Ursula

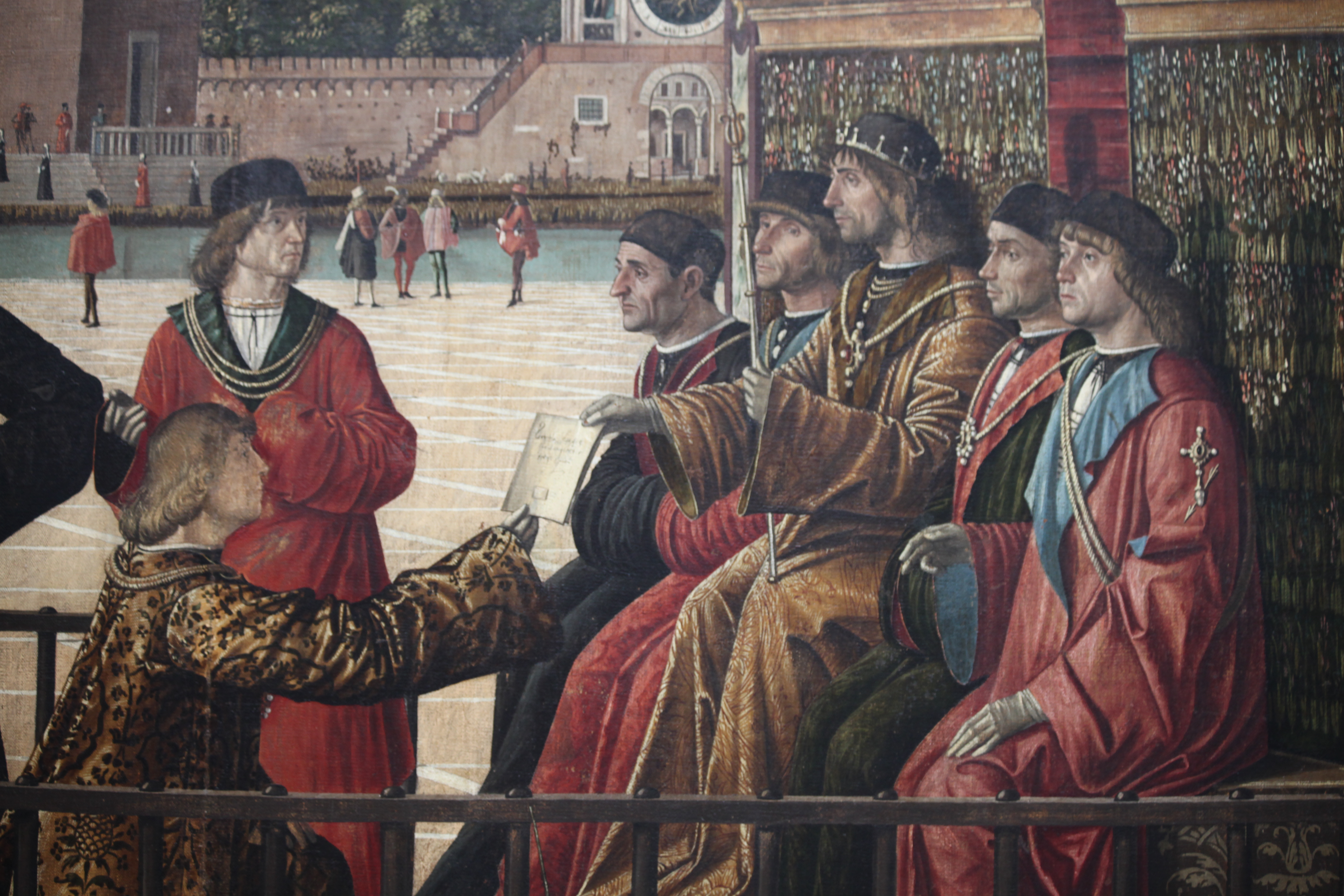
Dionotus, Saint Ursula's father, in a 1495 painting by Vittore Carpaccio

Dionotus was a legendary king of Cornwall in Geoffrey of Monmouth's Historia regum Britanniae, an account of the rulers of Britain based on ancient Welsh sources and disputed by many historians. Dionotus succeeded his brother Caradocus, and was regent of Britain during the campaigns in Gaul of Emperor Magnus Maximus. The curious thing about this king is that the Welsh chronicles, which parallel most of Geoffrey of Monmouth's book, do not mention this king by name. However, Geoffrey uses Latin versions of Welsh names so he could be referring to Dynod, duke of Cornwall, or Anwn Dynod, Maximus's own son.

Nothing is said of Dionotus until he became king under Maximus. He is first mentioned when Conan Meriadoc, king of Brittany sends a request to Britain for Briton women to help populate his country. Dionotus, being extremely noble and powerful, accepted the request and sent seventy-two thousand women to Gaul. The ships, however, became lost at sea and most of the women died or were captured by barbarians.

No further mention is made of Dionotus by Geoffrey of Monmouth, but a small group of these women defied kings Wanius and Melga of the Picts and the Huns, who attempted to have intercourse with them. The women were slaughtered for their defiance and the kings invaded Britain from Albany. Britain, due to the war led by Maximus and the tragedy at sea, was empty of all able-bodied men and women. This allowed the two kings room to destroy much of the countryside before any attempt at resisting them could be made.

Maximus finally sent a man named Gracianus Municeps to stop the attack by the kings. He was sent in with two legions and killed many thousands of warriors before the kings fled off the island to Ireland. Maximus died in Rome soon after, and while no mention is made of Dionotus or his fate, Gracianus took hold of the crown.

A passing mention is made in the Historia regum Britanniae to Conan Meriadoc being madly in love with his daughter, Ursula, which reflects the ninth century legend of Saint Ursula. According to the legend, Dionotus (her father, said to be king of Dumnonia) is asked her hand in marriage by Conan Meriadoc, the pagan governor of Armorica. After obtaining a three-year delay, she was given as companions ten young women, each of which had a thousand virgin handmaidens; they embarked in eleven ships and sailed for three years, but when the time came for her marriage, the ships were miraculously carried by a gale first to Cologne, then Basel and on to Rome before returning to Cologne where they were killed by Huns.

As well as this source, Geoffrey may also have based this character on the historical figure of Marcus, a short lived Roman usurper whose limited historical exploits are seemingly mirrored by Dionotus'.

Legendary titles
Preceded by Caradocus	King of Cornwall	Unknown Next known title holder: Gorlois as duke
Preceded by Maximianus	Regent of Britain for Maximianus	Succeeded by Gracianus Municeps
