= Mark of Cornwall =

Husband of Iseault in Arthurian legend

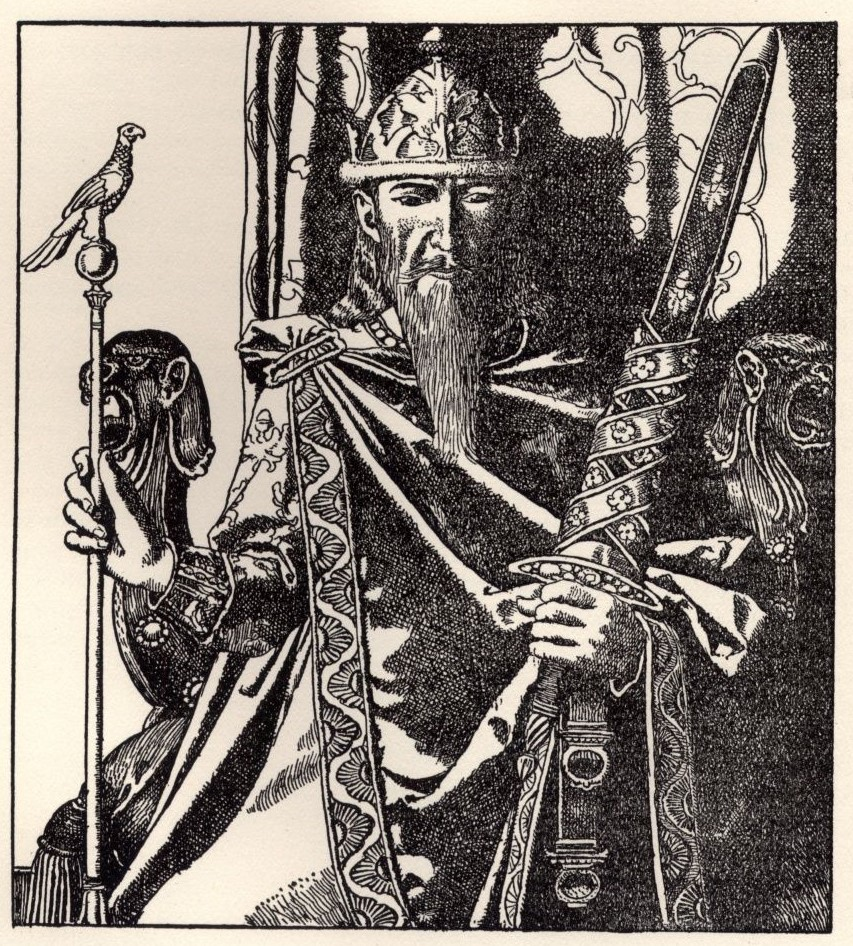
King Mark of Cornwall as drawn by Howard Pyle for his The Story of the Champions of the Round Table (1905)

Mark of Cornwall (Latin: Marcus, Cornish: Margh, Welsh: March or Marchell, Breton: Marc'h) was a sixth-century King of Cornwall, possibly identical with King Conomor. As Mark or Marc (Marc'h), he is best known for his appearance in Arthurian legend as the uncle of Tristan and the husband of Iseult. His young wife engages with Tristan in a secret liaison, giving Mark the epithet "Cuckold King".

== King Mark ==
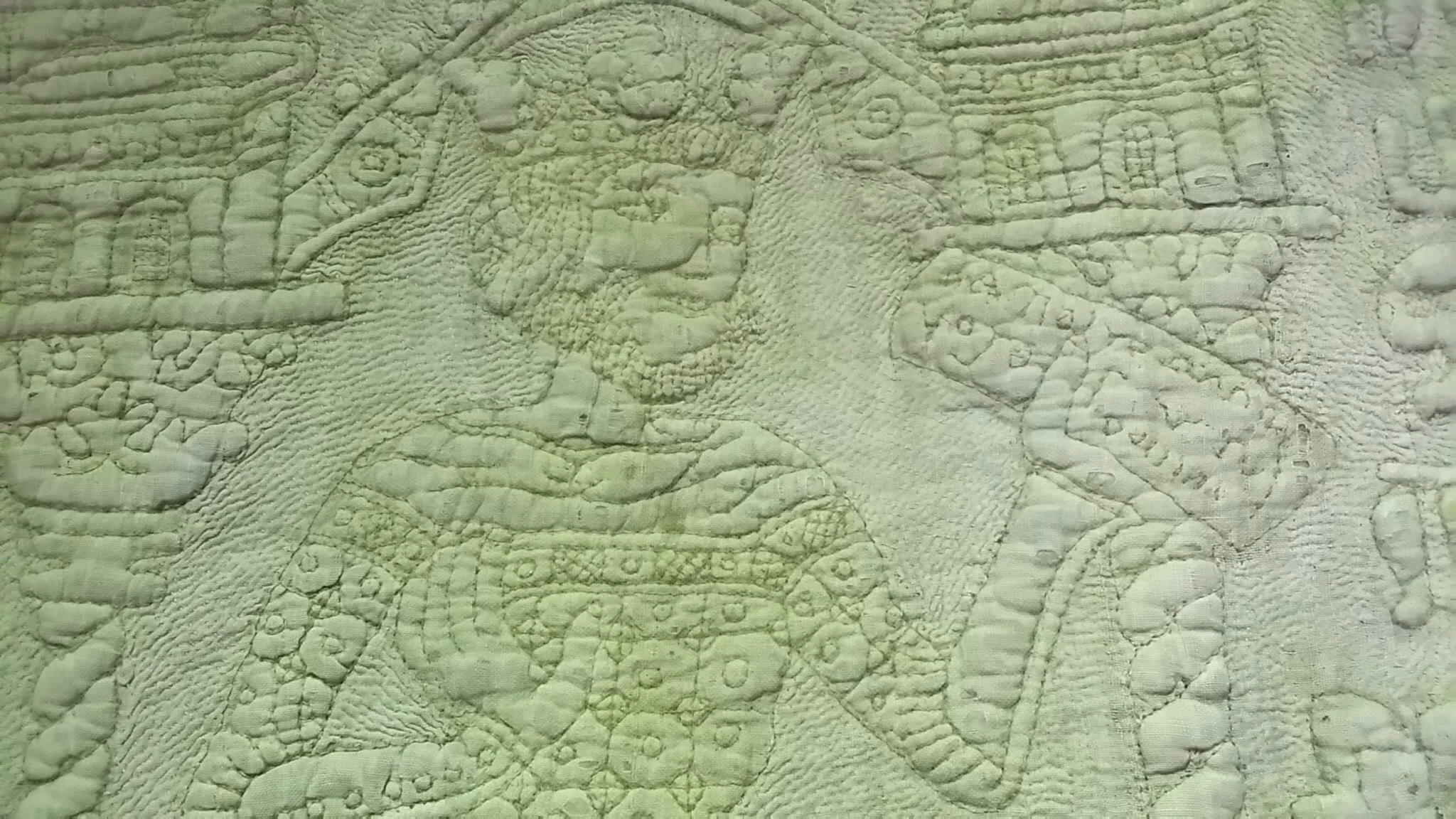
A 14th-century depiction of Mark of Cornwall from the Tristan Quilt

In Old Welsh records, Mark is recorded as "March son of Meirchion" of Kernow (Cornwall). He is associated with governing portions of Gwynedd and Glamorgan in Wales. The distance of these areas from modern day Cornwall may indicate that Mark was in fact a ruler of the eponymous Cornovii. Mark has been identified with Conomor, a king of Domnonea and Kernev (Domnonée and Cornouaille) in Armorica.

In his Life of St. Pol de Leon, Wrmonoc of Landévennec refers to a "King Marc whose other name is Quonomorus". Also rendered as Cunomorus, the name means "Hound-of-the-sea".

An inscription on a sixth-century gravestone near the Cornish town of Fowey memorializes (in Latin) a "Drustanus son of Cunomorus", and it has been thought that this is the "Tristan son of Mark (alias 'Quonomorus')" of legend. The present location of the stone is at grid reference SX112521, but it was originally at Castle Dore. It has a mid-6th-century, two-line inscription which has been interpreted as DRVSTANVS HIC IACIT CVNOWORI FILIVS ("Drustan lies here, of Cunomorus the son"). A now-missing third line was described by the 16th-century antiquarian John Leland as CVM DOMINA OUSILLA ("with the lady Ousilla"). Ousilla is a Latinisation of the Cornish female name Eselt. The stone led to Mark's association with Castle Dore.

== Legend ==
A fragmentary poem that speaks of Drystan and March in the Black Book of Carmarthen may be the only Welsh Tristan written material that predates the works of French poetry. March as the uncle of Drustan and the husband of Essylt is also mentioned in the Welsh Triad 71, "Three Lovers of the Island of Britain".

In most versions of the legend of Tristan and Iseult, King Mark of Cornwall is Tristan's uncle. His sister is Tristan's mother, Blancheflor (also known as Elizabeth or Isabelle). In some later versions he is related to Tristan's father, Meliadus. Peter Bartrum noted "In the older versions of the Tristan legend Mark was a sympathetic character and behaved honourably in spite of much frustration."

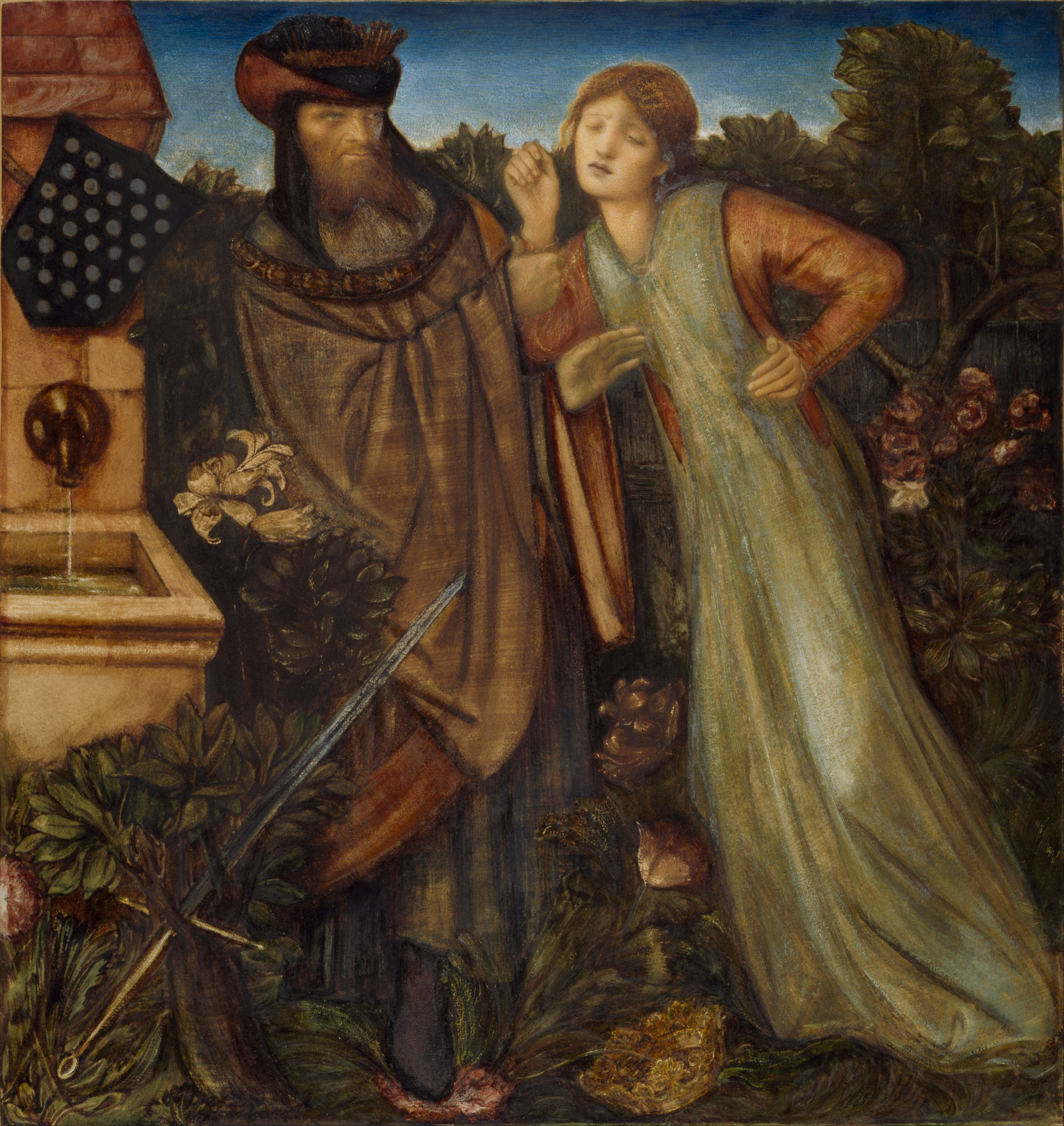
King Mark and La Belle Iseult by Edward Burne-Jones (1862)

King Mark sends Tristan as his proxy to bring his young bride, Princess Iseult (or Isolde), from Ireland. She and Tristan fall in love and, with the help of a magic potion, engage in one of the stormiest love affairs in medieval literature. Mark suspects the affair. In a major tradition, his suspicions are eventually confirmed; Mark sends for Tristan to be hanged, and banishes Iseult to a leper colony. Tristan escapes the hanging, and rescues Iseult from her confinement. Mark later discovers this, and eventually forgives them; Iseult returns to Mark, and Tristan leaves the country. In another version, on the other hand, Tristan and Iseult are never in grave danger; the narrator declares that he and God are on their side. The story is cyclical, with Mark repeatedly suspecting Tristan and Iseult of adultery and then believing that they are innocent. Marie de France's Breton lai Chevrefoil begins with an explanation of Mark's fury at the affair of Tristan and Isoude, which leads Mark to banish Tristan from Cornwall.

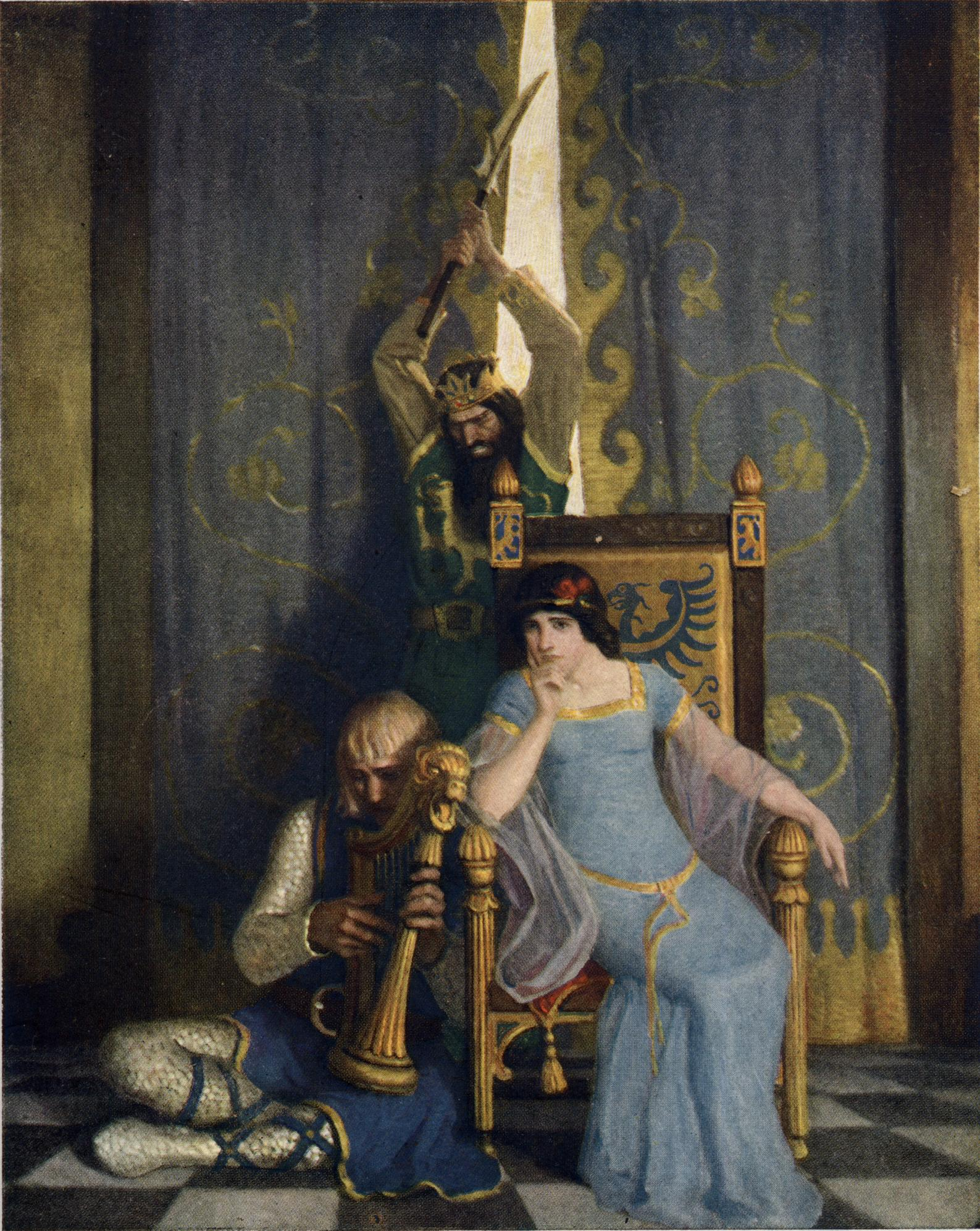
N. C. Wyeth's 1922 illustration for The Boy's King Arthur: "King Mark slew the noble knight Sir Tristram as he sat harping before his lady la Belle Isolde."

In the Prose Tristan, Mark and his character deteriorates from a sympathetic cuckold to a villain; he rapes his niece and murders her when she produces his son, Meraugis. Mark also murders his brother, Prince Boudwin, and later kills Boudwin's vengeful teenage son, Alexander (Alis[u]ander) the Orphan. In earlier variants of the story, Tristan dies in Brittany far from Mark; in the Prose Tristan, however, Tristan is mortally wounded by Mark while he plays the harp under a tree for Iseult. This version of Mark was popular in other medieval works, including the Romance of Palamedes and Thomas Malory's Le Morte d'Arthur. In these texts, Mark (son of the late King Felix in the Italian variant, La Tavola Ritonda) usually rules Cornwall from Tintagel Castle and often figures as an enemy of Arthur's jester knight, Dinadan. In the Post-Vulgate Cycle, Mark even destroys Camelot after the death of Arthur, allying himself with the pagan Saxons and killing the Archbishop of Logres.

Some Post-Vulgate variants end with the death of Mark. In Micheau Gonnot's Arthurian Compilation, Mark is ambushed by the sons of his baron, Dinas, who tie him to a tree and leave him to be eaten alive by a bear. Malory's version says that Alisander's son eventually avenges his father and grandfather, presumably by killing Mark.

Although the differences in treatment of the love potion are slight, medieval authors' treatment of Mark varies widely. Some authors, like Malory (who draws on the Prose Tristan), go out of their way to make Mark into an irrational, sadistic man. Others, including both Thomas and Beroul, seem to have a sympathetic view of Mark as a conflicted, loving husband and uncle (...) In many ways, likewise, the portrayal of the lovers themselves differs from work to work, and often seems to be inversely related to Mark's goodness or lack thereof. Beroul, who creates a sympathetic Mark, makes the lovers almost malicious, seeming to delight in their ability to misdirect Mark whenever he becomes suspicious. By contrast, the Prose Tristan, the work on which Thomas Malory drew most heavily, creates a noble and sympathetic Tristan who is a perfect foil for his cruel and sadistic uncle. In regard to the Prose Tristan's Mark, Vinaver comments that "it is Tristan's duty, not his misfortune, to act as his rival and keep him in check. The tragic tale of unlawful love yields its place to a romance of chivalry with its characteristically simple scale of values, its exaltation of chivalric virtues, and its condemnation of all that lies beyond the narrow boundaries of the 'adventurous kingdom.'" The Prose Tristan's Mark falls unarguably on the "evil" end of this "simple scale of values," acting as a foil against whom the models of chivalry, Tristan and Lancelot, can be clearly delineated in their full heroic glory. No one version seems to be authoritative in its depictions of the major figures; the portrayal of both Mark and the lovers seems to be dependent entirely on the goals of individual writers.

— Alan Lupack, University of Rochester'a Camelot Project

=== Horse ears ===
Mark has become associated with a Celtic variant of the story of Midas and his donkey ears from Greek mythology, due to a pun on marc (a Celtic word for "horse"). The story occurs in Tristan by the 12th-century French poet Béroul, where a dwarf reveals that "Mark has horse's ears" to a hawthorn tree in the presence of three lords.

According to a Breton tale published in 1794, Mark was initially the king of Cornouaille, France, and was seated at Ploumarch (Portzmarch). (Note: He is known as the "king of Portzmarch" (not as Mark) in Cambry's 1794 version.) The king kills every barber who knows the secret about his ears except one, who tells the secret to the sand (or wind). Reeds grow from that spot, which are harvested to make reeds for the oboe (or, simply, pipes). When the instruments are played, the music seems to say that the king has horse's ears. John Rhys recorded a Welsh tale similar to the simpler Breton version. (Note: The reeds sprang from the place where the king's victims were buried.)

An embellished version, collected by Yann ar Floc'h in 1905, blends the legend of Ys with the premise that Mark was condemned by Gradlon's daughter Ahès (or Dahut). Mark tried to hunt her when she assumed the guise of a doe, and had his ears exchanged for those of his prized horse Morvarc'h.

== Modern culture ==
- King Mark has a gruesome role in Alfred, Lord Tennyson's poetry cycle Idylls of the King. While Arthur and many of his knights are taking on the court of the Red Knight, Lancelot is called upon to judge the Tournament of the Dead Innocence. The tournament quickly becomes a mockery, full of insults and broken rules. Tristram (Tristan) is the winner of the tournament, winning all the rubies from the necklace. He then breaks with tradition in presenting them to a woman, saying: "This day my Queen of Beauty is not here." This enrages the crowd, and many say that "All courtesy is dead," and "The glory of our Round Table is no more." Tristram, who in this version marries Isolt of the White Hands, carries his winnings to Mark's wife Queen Isolt (who is upset that Tristram married another woman). They mock each other briefly before Tristram puts the necklace around Isolt's neck and leans down to kiss her. Mark appears as his lips touch her, killing Tristram with a sword.
- Mark (the German "Marke") is a character in Wagner's 1859 opera, Tristan und Isolde, where the role was first sung by the bass Ludwig Zottmayr.
- Ernest Rhys' poem "The Lay of King Mark" in Lays of the Round Table and Other Lyric Romances (1905).
- In the 1954 film The Black Knight, he is depicted by Patrick Troughton as a pagan trying to overthrow Christianity and King Arthur.
- C. S. Lewis and Owen Barfield role-played as solicitors of King Mark (represented by Barfield) and Tristan (Tristram, defended by Lewis as the law firm 'Blaise & Merlin') in a series of letters discussing the theories about Malory's life that were published in 1967 as Mark vs. Tristram.
- In the 1970s TV show Arthur of the Britons, Mark was played by Brian Blessed.
- In 1981 film Lovespell, King Mark was played by Richard Burton in the main role.
- Mark (called "Marc'h of Kernow") is a character in Diana L. Paxson's 1988 novel The White Raven presenting the story from the point of view of Iseult's cousin, Branwen.
- In Bernard Cornwell's 1996 novel Enemy of God (part of his The Warlord Chronicles series), King Mark is a physically and morally monstrous tyrant who murders his young wife every few years to marry another. When Mark's newest teenage wife flees with his young son Tristan, the fugitive lovers take refuge in Mordred's kingdom of Dumnonia under the regency of Tristan's friend, Arthur. Arthur allows Mark to arrive with his soldiers, and has the prince killed and the queen burned at the stake. Mark later dies from a horrible illness.
- In the 2006 film Tristan & Isolde, Marke was played by Rufus Sewell as a benevolent figure. He adopts Tristan as his son after the death of the boy's parents, who loyally supported Marke's plans to unite Britain. Marke is portrayed as a good ruler and a kind husband to Isolde (unaware that she has already fallen for Tristan), and is confused by his adopted son's unhappy, distanced behaviour. When Tristan and Isolde are caught embracing, Marke feels angry and betrayed; he relents after hearing the story of their meeting and lets them leave together, although Tristan insists on staying to stand against Marke's enemies. After Tristan is mortally wounded in battle, Marke returns him to Isolde for his last moments and then unites Britain.

== See also ==
- List of legendary rulers of Cornwall

== Notes ==
Legendary titles
Preceded by Felix	King of Cornwall	Unknown
