= Tegau Eurfron =

Welsh queen

- First appearance: Livre de Carados and Le Manteau Mal Taillé

In-universe information
- Significant other: Caradoc Vreichvras
- Origin: Celtic

Tegau Eurfron was a legendary Celtic queen of the Early Christian era who was the wife of King Caradoc Vreichvras, whose kingdom is disputed but may have been Gwent or one of the Breton kingdoms.

== Records ==
To the monastic writers of the Middle Ages she was most notable for three things: her cloak (or mantle; one of the Thirteen Treasures of Britain), her loyalty and her seafaring. She is described as Caradoc's wife in the French Romances, Livre de Carados (The Book of Caradoc) and Le Manteau Mal Taillé (The Badly Tailored Mantle), short stories dated to the end of the 12th century.

The first record her being named 'Tegau' is found in the 14th century, in the work of Goronwy Ddu ap Tudur (1320–1370) and in a poem by Dafydd ap Gwilym (fl. 1340–1370). Guto'r Glyn (fl. 1440–1493) compares his patroness with her, and his patron to Caradoc Vreichvras. He says her mantle reached the floor, but that the mantle of other girls was not so long. Around the same time Lewys Glyn Cothi (fl. 1447–1486) insisted that his patron was of the lineage of Caradoc and "Thegau Eururon".

These poets refer to her as a symbol of purity and fidelity to one's husband. She is referred to for the first time with the epithet 'Eurfron' in 1576.

== Her legend ==
The stories about Tegau spread from Wales, through Britain to France:

- There are various stories about her, among them an explanation of how she acquired the name 'Eurfron'. The first time this tale appeared was in the Livre de Carados, one of the French Arthurian romances.
- That is another story about her mantle that had secret values, and tested whether the girl was a virgin or not. This is recorded in Le Manteau Mal Taillé', a romance from the late 12th century (Romania, XIV, (1885) pp. 343–380) and later in an English ballet called The Boy and the Mantle (Bishop Percy's Folio Document in J. W. Hales and Frederick J. Furnival, II.301–311). There is a link in this story with Guinevere, the wife of King Arthur. In one record, Guinevere and the ladies of the court are all said to have tried wearing the mantle, but it did not fit them and appeared all torn and in rags about them. When Tegau was given the outfit the same thing happened, and it looked all ugly. But she turned to kiss her beloved, Caradoc (this was before they had married), upon which the mantle fitted her like a glove.
- There is a third story which adds a similar test with a drinking horn that spills wine over any man with an unfaithful adulterous wife and a carving knife that only a husband with an unfaithful wife can use.
