= Missa in honorem Sanctae Ursulae =

Portrait of Michael Haydn by Franz Xaver Hornöck

Michael Haydn completed the Missa in honorem Sanctae Ursulae, Klafsky 1:18, MH 546, on August 5, 1793, probably for use at the ceremony in which Ursula Oswald, the daughter of a friend, professed her religious vows at the Benedictine Abbey of Frauenwörth Chiemsee (as Saint Ursula was her name day saint). Because of that fact, the Mass is sometimes known as the Chiemsee Mass.

The score calls for a quartet of vocal soloists, mixed choir, 2 bassoons, 2 trumpets in C, timpani, and strings with an organ to play basso continuo. Additionally, Haydn would have expected three trombones to double "the lower voices in choral tuttis," a second organ to play continuo during choral tuttis, as described by Leopold Mozart.

1. "Kyrie" Un poco Adagio, C major, common time
2. "Gloria" Allegro, C major, 3/4
3. "Credo" Allegro, C major, common time
  —"Et incarnatus est..." Adagio, A minor, 3/4
  —"Et resurrexit..." Vivace assai
4. "Sanctus" Adagietto, mehr langsam, C major, 3/4
  —"Pleni sunt coeli..." Allegro
5. "Benedictus" Allegro moderato, G major, common time
  —"Osanna..." 3/4, C major
6. "Agnus Dei" Andante mà Comodo, C major, 3/4
  —"Dona nobis pacem..." Allegro molto

Haydn treated this setting of the mass ordinary "along symphonic lines" rather than "in the manner of the old Cantata Mass." Consequences of the treatment are that include the solo quartet acting as more of "a foil to the choral tutti" and the use of fugue "as the primary medium of thematic elaboration."

== Sources ==
- Sherman, Charles, 1969. Mainz Foreword to Missa pro Defunctis, Universal Edition
- Sherman, Charles, 1980. Madison, Wisconsin Preface to Missa in Honorem Sanctae Ursulae, A-R Editions, Inc.
