= Gracianus Municeps =

Legendary Briton king

Gracianus Municeps (also known as Gratianus) was a legendary King of the Britons, according to Geoffrey of Monmouth's Historia regum Britanniae (Latin: History of the Kings of Britain), a largely fictional account of British history. "Municeps" translates to "freedman", meaning this individual was Gracianus the freedman. After the death of Roman Emperor Magnus Maximus, Gracianus seized the throne of Britain upon receiving word of Maximus's demise, by whose orders he had been sent to defend the attacked island while Maximus was campaigning on the continent.

Gracianus was a freedman, who had served under Maximus during his campaigns in Rome and Germany, and was sent to Britain to defeat Wanius and Melga, the kings of the Picts and Huns respectively. He defeated the armies of both kings immediately upon arrival, ejecting them to Ireland. Soon after, word came that Maximus had died at the hands of either a supporter of the late Roman Emperor Gratian or by one of Gracianus Municeps' own followers. Despite mention previously made by Geoffrey of Monmouth of Dionotus, regent in Maximus' absence and king of Cornwall, Gracianus seized the crown of Britain and began a reign of terror throughout the island but soon certain plebs banded together and assassinated him. This led to a period of instability when news of his demise reached Britain's enemies, but he was eventually succeeded by Constantine II of Britain, the brother of King Aldrien of Brittany.

Historically, the predecessor to Constantine was Gratian on whom Geoffrey's tale was probably based. Bede refers to this Gratian as Municeps in Chapter XI of his Ecclesiastic History of the English People (Historia ecclesiastica gentis Anglorum) and the epithet is seemingly there to distinguish this Gratian from the earlier Gratian killed by the Usurper Magnus Maximus.

== See also ==
- End of Roman rule in Britain

Legendary titles
Preceded by Maximianus; Dionotus (regent)	King of Britain	Vacant Turmoil Title next held by Constantine II
