= Ludwig Zottmayr =

German bass-baritone (1828–1899)

- Born: 31 March 1828; Amberg, Germany
- Died: 16 October 1899 (aged 71); Weimar, Germany
- Occupation: Operatic bass-baritone
- Years active: 1855–1880
- Organisation: Münchner Hofoper

Ludwig Zottmayr (31 March 1828 – 16 October 1899) was a German bass-baritone. He is known for creating the role of King Marke in Wagner's Tristan und Isolde at its 1865 premiere at the Bavarian court opera in Munich.

== Early life and career ==
Zottmayr was born in Amberg on 31 March 1828. After making his stage debut in Nuremberg in 1855, he sang at the Stadttheater Hamburg from 1858 to 1861. His roles included Hoël at the Hamburg premiere of Giacomo Meyerbeer's Dinorah on 11 January 1860. He was a guest performer in Dresden later that year, singing as Hoël and as Count Almaviva in Mozart's Le nozze di Figaro. Meyerbeer, who attended the Dresden performance, praised the emotion of Zottmayr's performance and wrote that he had a "beautiful voice" ("wunderschöne Stimme"). Zottmayr worked at the Hannover court theatre from 1861 until 1865, when he joined the Munich court opera (now the Bavarian State Opera).

After Zottmayr arrived in Munich, he was assigned the role of King Marke in the premiere of Wagner's Tristan und Isolde on 10 June 1865. Wagner originally planned to cast Johann Nepomuk Beck who had trained for the role several years earlier with Peter Cornelius, but Beck was unable to perform due to a scheduling conflict with the Vienna State Opera. Zottmayr's performance was heavily criticized by the music historian Max Zenger:

How Wagner could have selected this singer, the uncouthness of whose movements was surpassed only by that of his singing, for a part in every way so difficult and perilous was simply incomprehensible to the people in the theater, including myself.

When Tristan und Isolde was performed again in Munich in 1869, Zottmayr was replaced by Kaspar Bausewein. Hans von Bülow, who conducted both the 1865 and 1869 performances and who previously described Zottmayr as having a "fine voice, but very imperfectly trained", later told Wagner that Bausewein was "infinitely better" than his predecessor. Despite the negative reception, Zottmayr had a successful career at the Munich opera until his retirement in 1880. His roles included the title characters in Mozart's Don Giovanni, Marschner's Hans Heiling, and Rossini's William Tell, and Mozart's Figaro. He gave guest performances at the opera houses in Berlin, Graz, and Riga.

== Personal life ==
Zottmayr was married to the singer Euphrosyne Stanko. Their son Georg later became an operatic bass in Dresden. Zottmayr's younger brother, Max Zottmayr, was a tenor who sang at the Oper Frankfurt and in Kassel.

After his retirement in 1880, Zottmayr lived in Hamburg and then Weimar, at the Marie Seebach Home for impoverished artists. He died on 16 October 1899 in Weimar at the age of 71.
