= Caradoc =

5th-6th century Celtic king in South Wales or Brittany

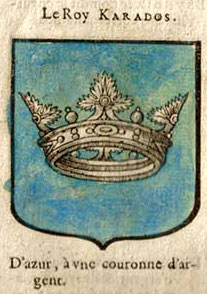
King Karados' attributed arms in medieval French prose romances

Caradoc Vreichvras (Welsh pronunciation: [kʰaˈɾɑːdak]; (Note: In Gilbert and Sullivan's Major-General's Song, "Sir Caradoc's" must be pronounced to rhyme with "paradox".) Modern Welsh: Caradog Freichfras, lit. 'Caradoc Strongarm') was a semi-legendary ancestor to the kings of Gwent. He may have lived during the 5th or 6th century. He is remembered in the Matter of Britain as a Knight of the Round Table, under the names King Carados and Carados Briefbras (French for "Carados Shortarm").

== Identification and historicity ==
Though the name "Caradoc" and its various forms were by no means uncommon during the Middle Ages, it is probable some of the Caradocs referred to in Welsh genealogies and hagiographies such the Life of St. Tatheus are the same person.

Due to the name's prevalence considerable confusion exists about Caradoc's identity, both historical and literary. He may have become confused with the British hero Caratacus (the Latin form of Caradoc), Cerdic of Wessex and any number of British history's later Caradocs. His parentage varies from text to text; he is called the son of Llŷr Marini (possibly implying Llŷr) several times in the Mabinogion, and a probably-Breton legend found in the first Perceval continuation has a certain Caradoc the Elder as the father, furthering the obfuscation.

Some archaeologists interpret Caradog Freichfras as a plausible historical figure, also known as Caradoc ap Ynyr, who may have been the ruler of Gwent around the 6th century, and was based at Caerwent, the earlier Roman town of Venta Silurum. They interpret his name as a remembrance of the earlier hero Caratacus, implying a continuity of tradition from the pre-Roman culture of the Silures who occupied the same area in what is now south-east Wales, and which is also suggested by other material.

== Welsh Triads and Monmouth's Caradocus ==
Caradoc appears in the Welsh Triads, where he is described as Arthur's chief elder at Celliwig in Cornwall and one of the three knights of the island of Britain; his horse is named as Lluagor ('Host-Splitter'). The same title—chief elder of Cornwall—is also given in Culhwch and Olwen, which lists "Gormant the son of Ricca (Arthur's brother by his mother's side; the Penhynev [chief elder] of Cornwall was his father)", a parallel to later stories of Gorlois of Cornwall.

In Geoffrey of Monmouth's Historia Regum Britanniae, Caradocus is ruler of Cornwall under Octavius, who died during the reign of Emperor Magnus Maximus (383–388). The connection with Cornwall in the Triads may indicate that Monmouth used Caradoc as the basis for this character. Cornish antiquary Richard Carew instead places Caradocus as duke of Cornwall later, in 443, saying that Octavius tasked him with founding the University of Cambridge, and listing him as the predecessor of Gorlois.

== French romances ==
Caradoc appears frequently in Arthurian literature. His wife, Tegau (teg: 'pretty'; eurfron: 'golden-breast'), is described as Caradoc's wife in the Livre de Carados (The Book of Caradoc) and Le Manteau Mal Taillé (The Badly Tailored Mantle), short stories dated to the end of the 12th century.

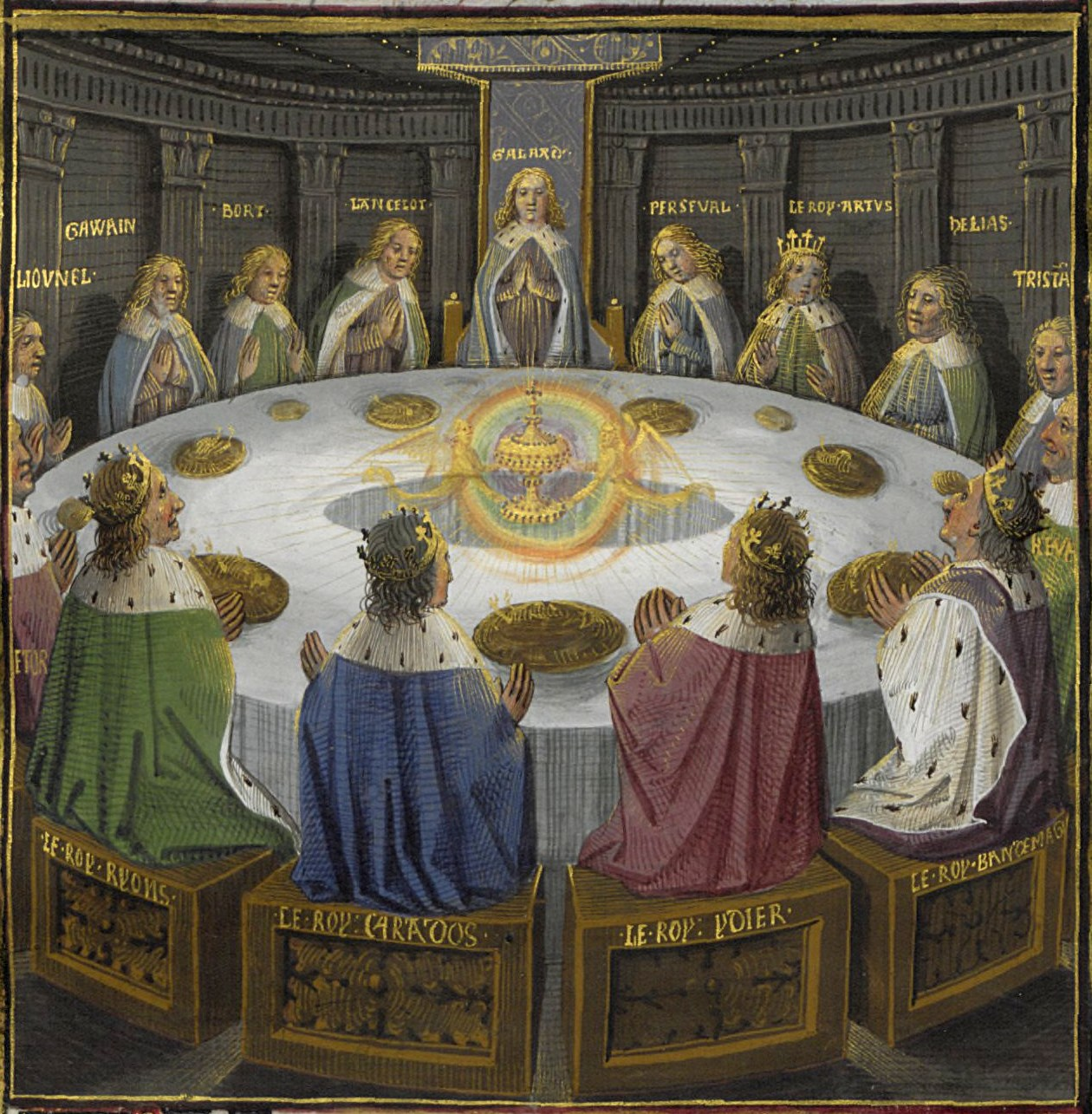
"The King Carados" (in blue at front) sits at the Round Table during the appearance of the Holy Grail in a 15th-century French miniature

In the later prose cycles of Arthurian romance, Caradoc is said to have been a knight of the Round Table during Uther Pendragon's time who joins other kings in rebellion when Arthur takes the throne but is eventually reconciled with the young king and become one of his most trusted allies. In the Vulgate Merlin, he even marries one of Arthur's five half-sisters; their son is King Aguisant of Scotland. In the Vulgate Mort Artu, Caradoc himself dies heroically in Arthur's final battle when he is killed by the Mordred-appointed lord of Scotland, Heliades, whom he also kills after leading the rout of Irish mercenaries.

Other, unrelated characters named Caradoc or Carados also appear in the French Arthurian prose romances and later works inspired by them.

== Life of Caradoc ==
Caradoc stars in his own minor romance, the Life of Caradoc included in the First Continuation of Chrétien de Troyes's Perceval, the Story of the Grail. The story, probably based on Celtic Briton tradition, seems created to explain how Caradoc got his nickname of 'Short Arm'.

Caradoc the Elder marries the beautiful Ysave, but she is soon seduced by an enchanter named Eliavres. Eliavres casts a spell over Caradoc to make him mistake various farm animals for his wife, while the wizard is busy fathering a son. Caradoc the Elder names the son after himself, and the boy grows up to be a worthy young squire. Caradoc the Younger goes off to King Arthur's court and is made a Knight of the Round Table like his father. Before long, Eliavres enters the hall and asks for a beheading test (a Celtic motif first appearing in the Old Irish text Fled Bricrenn ("Bricriu's Feast") and subsequently in a number of Arthurian texts, of which the best-known is the Middle English Sir Gawain and the Green Knight). Eliavres asks for a knight to lop off his head, the only catch being that if he survives, he may take the knight's head in return. Caradoc takes up the challenge, and dutifully offers his own neck when the sorcerer magically replaces his head. Eliavres declines to kill young Caradoc, but reveals that he is his natural father. Caradoc the Younger is understandably chagrined at the news. He embarks on a number of knightly adventures, whereupon he meets his best friend Sir Cador, travelling with his sister Guinier. Back in his kingdom, he reveals his father's cuckoldry, and Caradoc the Elder and Younger exact humiliating vengeance upon Eliavres, forcing him to mate with a female hound dog, (Note: Old French: lisse, lice.) a sow, and a mare, producing as offspring the mastiff (Note: Old French: waignon, gaignon.) Guinalot, the boar Tortain and the horse Lorigal. Eliavres is locked away from his mistress Ysave. All goes well until the wizard attempts to escape. When Caradoc the Younger tries to stop him, Eliavres summons a serpent that entwines itself around Caradoc's arm, crippling it and draining his life energy away. Cador and Guinier travel throughout the country trying to find how to remove the snake, and finally return with the solution. Caradoc will sit in a tub of vinegar while Guinier sits in a vat of milk with her supple breasts exposed. The serpent loathes the vinegar and leaps towards Guinier, but Cador kills it with his sword. Unfortunately he slices off Guinier's nipple in the process (it is later replaced with a magical gold one). Though Caradoc is freed from the snake, his arm is permanently damaged, leaving him with his nickname, "Caradoc Short Arm". Guinier and Caradoc are married, and after a fidelity test involving a drinking horn, they live happily ever after.

The tale exists in all three redactions of the First Continuation and is embedded, in abridged form, in one of the Reynard romances. Though it does not appear before the last decade of the 13th century, it is most likely based on a Welsh version, allusions to which can be found in the Welsh Triads. The Triads note Caradoc's wife, Tegau, for her love and fidelity, and her sobriquet "Eurfron" ("Gold-Breast") would suit Guiner from the Life of Caradoc. Additionally, there is mention of Tegau's fidelity-testing mantle, which is a common substitute for the drinking horn in chastity test stories.

Several versions of the Mantle of Chastity test involving Caradoc's wife were translated into Norse during the reign of King Hakon Hakonarson, and a version of the chastity test from The Book of Caradoc in the First Continuation of the Old French Perceval is found in the Norse Möttuls saga. The story survives in the traditional English folk ballad The Boy and the Mantle, collected by Bishop Thomas Percy in Percy's Reliques. The chastity test involving the drinking horn was narrated in the Lai du cor (1160) by the jongleur Robert Biket, who claimed Cirencester was awarded to Caradoc for winning the drinking horn through the fidelity of his wife, and that the horn was on display there.

In 1698, Charlotte-Rose de Caumont de La Force rewrote the tale under the title L'Enchanteur ("The Enchanter"). The story was essentially the same, despite a few changes, including the renaming of several characters: Caradoc the Younger, Cador, Guinier and Ysave became Carados, Candor, Adelis and Isène.

== See also ==
- Bro Gwened

== Bibliography ==
- Arthur, Ross Gilbert, Three Arthurian Romances: Poems from Medieval France: Caradoc, the Knight With the Sword, the Perilous Graveyard. Everyman's Library, 1996, ISBN 0-460-87577-9.
- Bromwich, Rachel, editor and translator. Trioedd Ynys Prydein: The Welsh Triads. Cardiff: University of Wales Press, 1978. ISBN 0-7083-0690-X
- Roach, William, ed. (2016) [1949–1955], The Continuations of the Old French "Perceval" of Chrétien de Troyes, vol. 1, University of Pennsylvania Press, ISBN 9781512805741
