= Cador =

Legendary Duke of Cornwall

Cador (Latin: Cadorius) is a legendary Duke of Cornwall, known chiefly through Geoffrey of Monmouth's pseudohistorical Historia Regum Britanniae and previous manuscript sources such as the Life of Carannog. In Welsh genealogical records, he appears as Cado (Cadwr), the son of Cornish king Geraint. Early sources present him as a relative of King Arthur, though the details of their kinship are usually left unspecified. (Note: An exception is a pedigree in the manuscript known as 'Hanesyn Hen' which partially survives in Llanstephan MS. 28, Peniarth 182, and Cardiff MS 25. The relevant section is in Bonedd yr Arwyr (32) which describes Arthur and Cadwr as "brawd vn vam" (brothers of one mother), Cadwr being the son of Gwrlais, Earl of Cornwall.)

== Historicity ==
Many stories involving Arthurian figures were told orally, leading to many interpretations and versions of the people, events, and characters. Scholars question the historical accuracy of these tales and most have been discredited, so the people associated with him could conceivably have been added by later storytellers.

One such figure was Arthur's close associate Cador, successor to Geraint ab Erbin, described by genealogist Peter Bartrum as "perhaps the invention of Geoffrey of Monmouth." According to legendary accounts, Cador the Duke of Cornwall was summoned to Arthur's court and may have been a real historical figure, but the diversity of interpretations and stories that include him make it difficult to understand his true context. According to the book King Arthur: The Truth Behind the Legend Arthurian events mix fact and fiction, and while many people and events could not have been real,

[t]he Arthurian saga is nevertheless much more than a hotchpotch of tales made up by medieval minstrels, and it is essential to try to separate the Arthur of the romances—the Arthur of Geoffrey of Monmouth, Thomas Malory and the medieval troubadours—from the historical Arthur—the dark age warrior on whom all the rest of the super-structure was built.

The factuality of many details is debatable. Arthur gave his crown to Constantine, son of Cador Duke of Cornwall, as he died May 21, 542 AD, which sets the time period in which Cador could have lived.

Cador is described as the son of a Dumnonian king named Gerrens, whom he succeeded as monarch. Traditionally, he was Arthur's good friend and even shared his throne in the Vita Sanctus Carantoci (Life of St. Carantoc). He seemed to have a good relationship with King Caradoc of Gwent.

Four hillforts all named "Cadbury"—one near Clevedon, one in Congresbury, one in Sparkford in Somerset, and one by the Exe in Devon north of Crediton—may have been named after Cador since the name may mean "Cado's fort". Similarly, Cadson Bury hillfort lies just outside Callington and is also known as "Celliwig" in Cornwall.

== Name ==
The name Cador does not match any early Welsh sources, so the name itself stems from a misinterpretation of either the name Catgur in the Harley genealogy, or the British Catigern. These names are similarly interpreted: Cador means 'battle notable' or 'fighter' since cat means 'battle' and gur means 'man' or 'warrior', and Tigern means 'leader'. While the name is not found in early Welsh sources, letters could easily have dropped out of Catgur or Catigern, leaving the name Cador.

Cador, mainly mentioned by Geoffrey of Monmouth, has also been called by two other names, Cado and Cadwy, in the Myvyrian and Life of S. Carannog and in early fifteenth century pedigrees. The Duke of Cornwall title took different forms over time because Cornwall was once a part of the Roman civitas of Dumnonia, giving Cador the often-seen title "King of Dumnonia".

== Cador's battles ==
Cador's battles are not recorded in the Historia Brittonum Arthurian battle list but are mentioned in many different works. He battled and defeated an invading force of Saxons on their way to York, then took York himself. The Saxons surrendered, pledged peace, and retreated. Later, they broke that pledge, which led to another battle between Arthur and the Saxons in which Cador killed the Saxon leader Chelric. Thereafter, following a few small altercations (like the Roman War), Cador's next big battle was at Camblan, after which he was found dead with some of his troops.

Some scholars speculate that Cador's battles can be seen through the Anglo-Saxon Chronicle presumably written by Alfred the Great. Since it names only one British commander, Vortigern, scholars have aligned the timelines in the Anglo-Saxon Chronicle and the Historia Regum Britanniae to assess the legitimacy of Cador. Many similarities between the battles can be noted, starting with an encounter in York, or along the Canterbury–London road with 3,000 to 4,000 British soldiers. Arthur and the British retreat to London in both versions. Cador's supposed next battle was in Thanet, which is noted in both texts. The unnamed British commander in the Anglo-Saxon Chronicle has been posited to be the Cador of Geoffrey's Historia Regum Britanniae because of their similarities.

== Arthurian pseudohistory and legend ==
Cador, Duke of Cornwall, appears in Geoffrey of Monmouth's Historia Regum Britanniae (ca. 1135). He is a man of power, referred to as both a duke (dux) and a king (rex). He is best known for his heroism in the battles of York and Isle of Thanet, recounted in the Historia Regum Britanniae. The historicity of Cador's involvement in these wars is still questioned by scholars. He won both battles, easily defeating the army in York and also killing Chelric, the leader of the Saxons, on the Isle of Thanet. Arthur's most successful siege, the Battle of Badon, precedes the battle at the Isle of Thanet, which seems strangely illogical given the timeline. Because no Saxon or British historians note any battle in that region before the sixth century, this battle could plausibly have been completely fabricated for literary purposes.

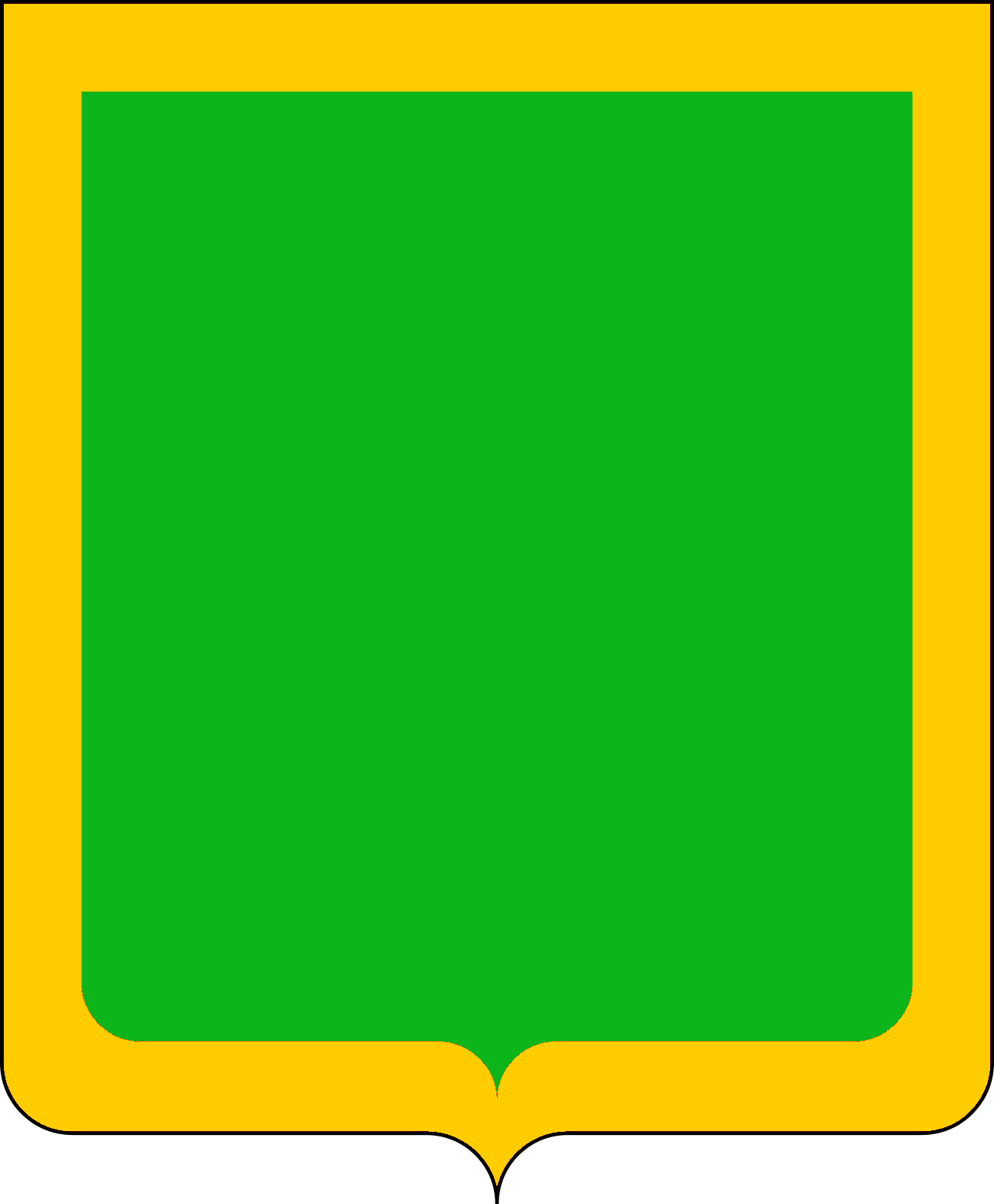
Coat of arms attributed to Cador in the French romance Life of Caradoc

Cador was reputedly the son of Geraint (Latin: Gerontius; Cornish: Gerrens), King of Dumnonia and a historic hero who died quite early, leaving his crown to Hoel because Cador was not of age. He was known to have children himself: Constantine (Welsh: Custennin), Peredur, and Cadoc. He shared a lineage with King Arthur as a great-grandson of Arthur's duke, based on the equivalency of Custennyn's and Constantine's genealogies.

Cador also had three brothers named Cyngar, Iestyn, and Selyf, all saints of Llancarfan; they are mentioned as related to Cador in the Myvyrian. In addition to his brothers, he had a sister named Gurguint who married Caradoc Vreichfas, a legend of Welsh prehistory who lived at same time period as Arthur. Many historians believe Caradoc Vreichfas was Cerdic of Wessex, Anglo-Saxon founder of the House of Wessex and the first king of Saxon Wessex (reign 519–534). According to Geoffrey, Cador married a woman named Ygerna (Igraine), who was courted and seduced by Arthur's father Uther Pendragon while Cador was away at war.

Cador is thought to be related to Arthur because in different texts he is addressed as such. Layamon, an English poet, wrote that Arthur said, "Cador, thou art mine own kin." However, some works say that Cador's son Constantine was Arthur's cousin, making Cador possibly an in-law rather than a blood relative.

In Geoffrey's Historia and elsewhere, Arthur's future queen Guinevere is said to have been raised as Cador's ward. Cador is also said to be of Roman stock. His son Constantine was given the kingship of Britain by Arthur as he lay ailing on the field of Camlann. In the Brut Tysilio, the translator adds that Cador was the son of Gorlois, presumably by Igraine, which would make him Arthur's maternal half-brother. (Note: Mary Stewart follows this lineage in her bestselling historical fantasy series The Merlin Trilogy, with Cador and Arthur half-brothers.) The same text also gives Cador a son, Mayric, who dies fighting the Romans. This story appears in Richard Hardyng's Chronicle which refers to Cador as Arthur's brother "of his mother's syde." In Layamon's Brut, Cador appears as a leader who takes charge of Uther's host when it is attacked by Gorlois as Uther secretly lies with Igraine in Tintagel. Most of the later works, such as the English Alliterative Morte Arthure and Thomas Malory's Le Morte d'Arthur, however, refer to Cador as Arthur's cousin, though in the Alliterative text, Arthur calls him his sister's son.

William Worcester travelled to Cornwall in 1478 and recorded in his Itineraries that "Tador Duke of Cornwall, husband of the mother of Arthur was slain" at Castle an Dinas. This is sometimes interpreted directly as Cador, and is generally interpreted as a conflation of Cador with Gorlois (the husband of Igraine in Historia Regum Britanniae), but likely reflects a local tradition, as the Historia is the only authority for Gorlois as Igraine's husband.

In The Dream of Rhonabwy, a medieval romance associated with the Mabinogion, Cador is "Cadwr Earl of Cornwall, the man whose task it is to arm the king on the day of battle and conflict" – i.e. at the Battle of Badon Hill, which the writer situates close to the upper River Severn.

== Notes ==
Legendary titles
Preceded by Gorlois	Duke of Cornwall	Succeeded by Constantine
