= Gorlois =

Legendary Duke of Cornwall

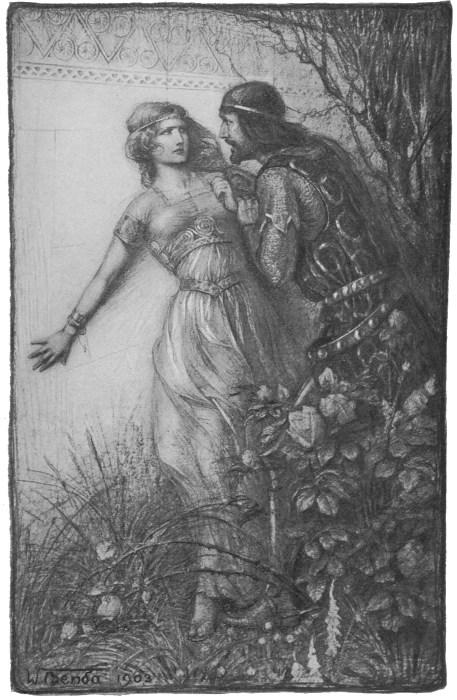
Igraine and Gorlois in Władysław T. Benda's illustration for Uther and Igraine by Warwick Deeping (1903). In much of modern Arthurian tradition (a prominent example is 1983's The Mists of Avalon), he is portrayed as a jealous and abusive husband

In Arthurian legend, Gorlois (Welsh: Gwrlais) of Tintagel was the Duke of Cornwall. He was the first husband of King Arthur's mother Igraine and the father of her daughters, Arthur's half-sisters. Her second husband was Uther Pendragon, the High King of Britain and Arthur's father, who marries her after killing him.

== Names ==
The name Gorlois first appears in Geoffrey of Monmouth's Historia Regum Britanniae (c. 1136). Culhwch and Olwen calls him Rica. The Prose Merlin and Of Arthour and of Merlin call him Duke Hoel (Höel) of Tintagel, the latter text describing him as Igraine's second husband but also prior to her marriage with Uther. In Perlesvaus, he appears as King Goloé (Golaas). William Worcester's Itineraries call him Tador.

== Legend ==
According to Historia Regum Britanniae, Gorlois was vassal of Ambrosius Aurelianus, whose arrival at the Battle of Kaerconan ensured the defeat of Hengist. In Wace's Roman de Brut, when Hengist's son Octa and his cousin Ossa rebel, Gorlois helps Uther defeat them at York. In the Brut Tysilio, a Welsh version of Geoffrey's work, Gorlois is the father of Cador, Duke of Cornwall, presumably by Igraine.

After he succeeds his brother, Ambrosius, Uther holds a feast for his nobles, and seeing Igraine, lusts after her. Sensing Uther Pendragon's interest, Igraine asks her husband to take her back home to Cornwall. He placed her at the more defensible Tintagel Castle, while he prepared to defend his territory from Dimilioc. Incensed at their departing without leave, Uther lays siege to Gorlois' castles to little effect. He consults his friend Ulfin who tells him that the lady can hardly look favorably on someone who makes war on her husband, and suggests the king seek advice from Merlin in gaining access to Tintagel. Merlin devises an enchantment that disguises Uther in the form of Gorlois. In this form he approaches Igraine and they sleep together, conceiving Arthur. Unbeknownst to either of them, the real Gorlois has been killed that very night in battle against Uther's troops. Eventually Igraine is persuaded to marry Uther. (In Thomas Hughes' 1587 play The Misfortunes of Arthur, Gorlois' ghost condemns Arthur for his father's treachery.)

Thomas Malory's Le Morte d'Arthur, following the later tradition of Merlin and French prose cycles, features Gorlois as the father of Morgan le Fay, Morgause, and Elaine, who are roughly corresponding with Brimesent, Belisent and Blasine in Gorlois' "Hoel" variant. After Gorlois' death, his three daughters are married off to vassals of Uther: Elaine to King Nentres of Garlot, Morgause to King Lot of Orkney, and (after she has received an education in a convent) Morgan to King Urien. Arthur is spared any knowledge of his half-sisters after he is whisked away by Merlin to be raised by Sir Ector.

The 11th/12th century Welsh text Culhwch and Olwen lists "Gormant son of Rica (Arthur's brother on his mother's side, his father the chief elder of Cornwall)". This passage is a parallel of later stories of Gorlois and Igraine. Scholars Rachel Bromwich and D. Simon Evans note the similarity between the Gor- element in Gormant and Gorlois' names, which could reflect a known practice in some late antiquity and early medieval European dynasties to share a name prefix. There is a possibility that Rica could be equated with Ricatus (or Recgisi), a name found on an 11th century Cornish cross. The Peniarth triads give the same title—Arthur's chief elder at Celliwig, Cornwall—to Caradoc, which could also equate him with Rica.

The 13th century Prose Merlin calls Ygerne's husband Hoel, Duke of Tintagell, with Ydiers as king of Cornwall. Hoel and Ygerne have five daughters together, who marry King Lot, King Ventres, King Urien, and King Briadas.

Richard Carew's Survey of Cornwall (1602) places Gorlois as husband of Igerna and duke of Cornwall in 500 AD, who is succeeded by Earl Cador by 526 AD. The Book of Baglan (1600–1607) calls him Gurleis, Goulisor, or Gwrleis, duke or prince of Cornwall, and husband of Eigyr; he is the father of Cador, and son of Sortogus, a direct male-line descendant of Maxentius, Dyfnwal Moelmud, Camber and Brutus of Troy.

William Worcester travelled to Cornwall in 1478, and recorded in his Itineraries that "Tador Duke of Cornwall, husband of the mother of Arthur was slain" at Castle an Dinas. This is generally interpreted as a conflation of Gorlois with Cador, and as an alternative place of Gorlois' death, differing from the Historia Regum Britanniae's account that he died at Dimilioc.

== Possible historicity ==
Henry Jenner considered Gorlois to be a real fifth or sixth-century figure, either a petty chief and vassal of the Royal House of Dumnonia, or of the line of the original chiefs of the Dumnonii if the kings of Dumnonia were the leaders of the Britons displaced by the Saxons. He suggested that Bosworlas (in St Just) and Treworlas (both the hamlet in Philleigh, and the house in Breage) were named after Gorlois, and noted that Bosworlas ('the Dwelling of Gorlois') is very close to Bosigran ('the Dwelling of Igerna').

== See also ==
- List of legendary rulers of Cornwall

Legendary titles
Unknown Last known title holder: Dionotus as king	Duke of Cornwall	Succeeded by Cador
