= Battle of Finnsburg =

450 legendary battle

- Part of the legends of the Germanic heroic age
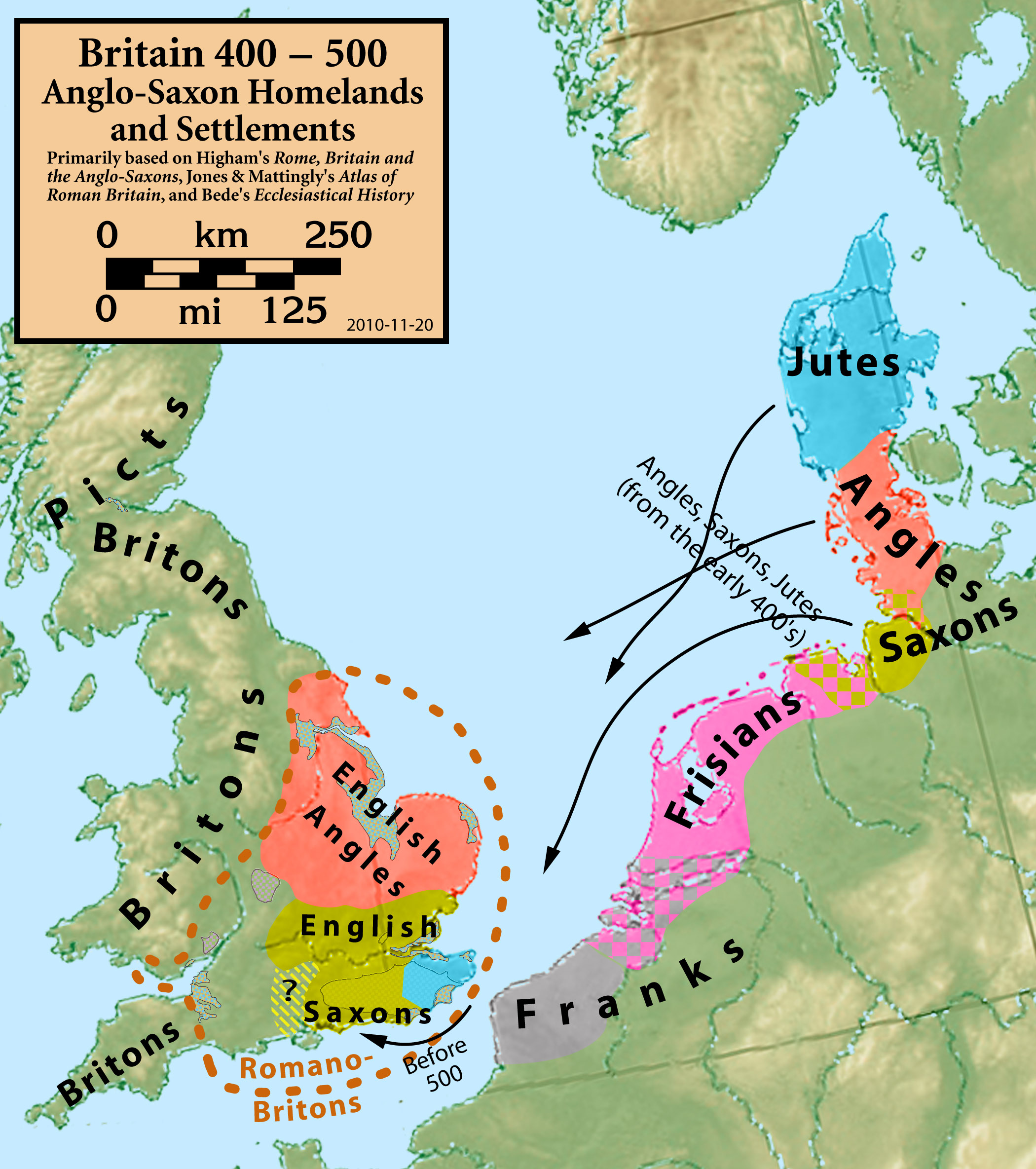
- The Frisian lands, and neighbouring kingdoms, in the 5th century, showing an approximate territorial boundary within which the battle took place
Date	c. 450 AD
Location	Finnsburg, Frisia
Result	Short lived peace treaty, followed by Danish victory

Belligerents
Frisians, and possibly Jutes	Danish Hocings, with others such as a Secgan lord

Commanders and leaders
King Finn † of Frisia	Prince Hnæf † of the Danish Hocings; Hengest

Strength
Unknown	60 men

Casualties and losses
Heavy losses in both phases	Unknown, at least one death in phase one

The Battle of Finnsburg (or Finnsburh) was a conflict in the Germanic heroic age between Frisians with a possible Jutish contingent, and a primarily Danish party. Described only in later Anglo-Saxon poetry, if the conflict had an historical basis it most likely occurred around 450 AD.

In the story, the young prince Hnæf, described as a Hocing, Half-Dane, and Scylding, was staying as an invited guest of the Frisian king Finn. For reasons unknown, a battle broke out between the two parties, probably started by the Frisian side, and Hnæf was killed. Hnæf's retainer Hengest took command, and the sides engaged in a peace treaty; but Hengest and the Danes later avenged Hnæf's death and slaughtered the Frisians.

The primary descriptive sources of the events are the Finnsburg Fragment, and an allusive section of Beowulf. Since the battle is well represented amongst such a small corpus of Anglo-Saxon heroic poetry, it was probably significant and once widely known. Due to the fragmentary and allusive condition of the sources, however, the story is difficult to reconstruct.

== Sources ==
=== Finnsburg Fragment ===
In 1705 a fragment of Anglo-Saxon epic poetry discovered in Lambeth Palace by George Hickes was published. Because of the fragmentary state of the manuscript, the action starts in medias res. It describes a young prince called Hnæf spurring his 60 men into battle, besieged inside a great hall. Some of his men are then named and their actions in battle followed. Two characters from the attacking force are also named, and one of these dies along with others in his force.

The killed attacker is said to be of the Frisian Islands, hinting at a location for the battle, and the specific location is identified as Finnsburg. The action closes with prince Hnæf and his men having been besieged for five days of battle, without any fatalities on their side. The Finnsburg Fragment is short, at around 50 lines long, and almost entirely lacking in internal context. Most of the context must instead be derived from the parallel episode in Beowulf, which describes events that take place mainly after the action narrated in the Finnsburg Fragment.

=== Episode in Beowulf ===
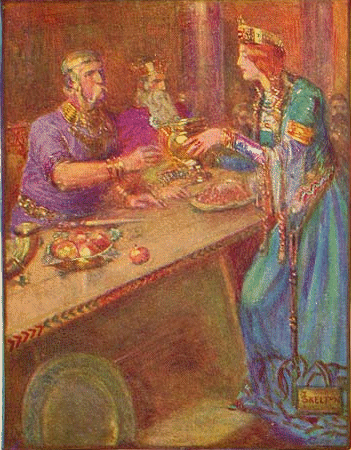
Wealhþeow, who "came forth / in her golden crown" after the Beowulf scop was finished narrating the Finnsburg story in Beowulf.

Beowulf as a poem primarily follows the exploits of its eponymous hero. After one of Beowulf's victories, a scop or court-poet narrates an old tale to the assembled guests. This tale narrates the events that follow after the story found in the Finnesburg Fragment. The Beowulf poet, however, makes his scop give the account in an extremely compact and allusive way. The audience of the poem were probably expected to already know about the episode in some detail. Because of this, summarising the scenario described in Beowulf will necessarily involve an element of either fragmentation or interpretative reconstruction.

The scop's story of the Freswæle (English: Frisian slaughter) begins with Hildeburh, daughter of Hoc, lamenting the loss of her son and brother. Both factions involved in the battle are said to have suffered heavy losses, but especially the þegnas (English: thanes or barons) of Finn. Because of this, Finn enters into a peace treaty with the besieged party led now by Hengest. Finn was to honour the Danes with feasts and gifts of treasure.

Hnæf and his unnamed nephew, said also to be Hildeburh's son, are placed on a funeral pyre. After this most of the Frisian warriors leave, but Hengest and probably some of the Danes stay throughout winter. Eventually a figure referred to as the son of Hunlaf places a sword on Hengest's lap to remind him of his loyalties. Other Danes also return, and probably together they wreak havoc on the Frisians and slay king Finn. The Danes take the unnamed Frisian queen back to what appear to be her own people in Denmark, identifying the Frisian queen as probably Danish.

=== Other sources ===
The Anglo-Saxon poem fragment Widsith mentions a Finn who is referred to by the patronymic Folcwalding, probably explaining the patronymic allusion in Beowulf to "Folcwald's son" as a reference to Finn. Widsith also mentions a Hnæf who is said to have ruled the Hocings. Since Hildeburh is said in Beowulf to be the daughter of Hoc and the sister of Hnæf, and since Widsith mentions a Hnæf ruling the people of Hoc, it seems clear that Widsith refers to the same Hnæf of the Battle of Finnsburg. It also mentions a Sæferð or Sasferth who can be identified with one of Hnæf's men, Sigeferth.

The only other source to perhaps allude to the battle is the Skáldskaparmál, where Snorri Sturluson mentions a coat of mail called Finnsleif (English: Finn's legacy). The names of some of the characters in the Battle of Finnsburg are mentioned in other sources, usually in genealogies such as the reference to Folcwald and Finn in the Historia Brittonum. Hengest is mentioned in several works, but his identity and exploits are unclear. One argument, still supported by some recent scholars, is that he is the same figure as the Anglo-Saxon founder of the Kingdom of Kent.

== Background ==
Since the unnamed Frisian queen in Beowulf is probably said to be of the Danish people, it seems very likely that Hildeburh is this Frisian queen. This means that Hnæf was probably staying as an invited guest of Finn at his home, Finnsburg (English: fortified stronghold of Finn), in Frisia, with Hildeburh connecting the two factions together:

She was clearly a Danish (or at least 'half-Danish') princess, who had married Finn, prince of the Frisians, doubtless a political move to secure peace between Danes and Frisians. Hildeburh had a brother, Hnæf, who apparently went to Finn with his Danish retinue in friendship.

Though the identification of Hnæf and Finn being brothers-in-law makes the situation much clearer, it shifts the emphasis of explanation onto the reason behind the subsequent battle. The battle may reflect a reoccurrence of the tensions which Hildeburh's marriage may have been a diplomatic move to quell. If the identification between the characters holds, moreover, then the son of Hildeburh and nephew of Hnæf who dies in the battle is probably therefore the son of Finn; he may even have been heir to the Frisian kingdom. In this respect it is especially notable that Hildeburh's son is laid on Hnæf's pyre. Tolkien suggested that Hildeburh's son was raised by Hnæf, and was being brought back to Finn at his coming of age; even that Hildeburh's son was one of the party besieged with Hnæf inside the great hall. Such a theory would add an extra layer of complexity, of a feeling of possible responsibility for filicide, to the already complicated psychological motivations of Finn.

== Battle phases ==
=== Phase One: The siege battle ===
But awake now, my warriors!
take up your shields, think of valor
fight in the vanguard, and be resolute!

— Liuzza (2000), Hnæf, Finnsburg Fragment, p.163

The siege is described primarily in the Finnsburg Fragment. Hnæf rouses his troops with a short but powerful speech. Two of his men, Sigeferth and Eaha go to one door (Door A), and another two of his men Ordlaf and Guthlaf go to another door (Door B) of the great hall in which they were trapped at Finnsburg. In Beowulf the pair "Guthlaf and Oslaf" are mentioned returning later to their home, so that Oslaf in Beowulf is probably to be identified with Ordlaf from the Finnsburg Fragment. Hengest follows Ordlaf/Oslaf and Guthlaf to Door B.

Outside the great hall, Garulf is planning to launch the first attack. Guthere counsels him not to do so, saying that Garulf's life is too valuable. Garulf proceeds anyway, and asks who holds that door. Sigeferth replies to Garulf's taunt from within, showing that the attack is being mounted at Door A. Sigeferth is said to be a lord of the Secgena; in Widsith a Sæferð or Sasferth is said to be lord of the Sycges or Secgan, apparently referring to the same character. The two sides fight at that door, and Garulf and many of the attackers die. It is not clear what happens to Guthere whom he was counselled by. Garulf is said to be Guthlaf's son; it is not clear whether or not this is the same Guthlaf who holds the door as a defender at Door B.

The battle continues for five days, and none of the besieged defenders of Hnæf and his men are killed. Then one of the defenders is wounded, and Hnæf asks the unnamed wounded defender how the other men are coping. There the Finnsburg Fragment ends. The narrative continues in Beowulf after the battle has ended; immediately Hnæf and his nephew are said to have been slain. On the attackers' side, the Beowulf scop says that "all of the thanes of Finn, except a few" were slain. Hengest is now the commander of the defenders.

=== Interim: Swearing of oaths ===
They swore their pledges then on either side,
a firm compact of peace. With unfeigned zeal
Finn swore his oaths to Hengest

— Liuzza (2000), Beowulf, p.87

Since Finn had lost most of his thanes, he was unable to fight Hengest, and the Beowulf poet says that for this reason they drew up a peace treaty. Nicola Zocco clarifies that the "Frisians offer to come to terms with the Danes because they need to resolve the situation in a bloodless way, given that they cannot afford a military victory." This gives the motivation for the attackers to enter into a peace bargain, but not for the motivation of the defenders. Perhaps the toll on them would also have been too large, that Hengest and his men would not have been able to break the deadlock of the siege. The peace treaty must have been reasonable to both commanders as the best way out of the stalemate.

The fact that the two sides did not fight to the death may indicate that Finn felt some remorse for the rules of hospitality having been broken against his brother-in-law Hnæf and his men. Seiichi Suzuki points out that the Beowulf poet implies twice that Finn was to blame and was blamed. Still, Finn may not have been a primary belligerent, only responsible in the capacity of a figurehead; and the picture is made more complex by the role of the eotena (see below). The Beowulf poet seems to allude to Finn's sincerity about the peace treaty when he says that Finn swore oaths to Hengest "with unfeigned zeal".

Not only were the peace terms probably offered by the Frisians to the Danes, but the Frisians were very submissive in the deal. Though under the treaty the Danes are not to complain about the death of Hnæf, Finn more extremely swears that any Frisian who provokes further violence would be, in the language of the poet, settled with the edge of the sword. The defenders are also to be given half of a new building, which, confusingly they are to share with Finn and the eotena sons (see below), and also to be given feasts and treasure by Finn. The concessions by Finn may reflect his remorse at the events, or it may have been seen as a suitable weregild for the defenders not avenging the killing of Hnæf. The Beowulf poet describes how Finn stuck to his oath by giving treasure.

Meanwhile, Hnæf and his nephew are placed on the funeral pyre and Hildeburh laments. Later most of the warriors go home, "to seek their native lands, / bereft of friends, to behold Frisia, / their homes and high fortresses." Hengest, and some retainers, stayed however with Finn over the winter; it is not clear why they do so. Donald K. Fry contends that Hengest stayed "by his own choice, by his own design."

=== Phase Two: The Frisian slaughter ===
So he did not refuse the world's custom
when the son of Hunlaf placed a glinting sword,
the best of battle-flames, upon his lap

— Liuzza (2000), Beowulf, p.88

Eventually a man described as the son of Hunlaf, but given no more specific name or description, places a sword on the lap of Hengest. The sword, a hildeleoma (English: battle-light) which may either be the name of the sword or a description of it, is said to be renowned to the eotenum (see eotena below). Olivieri suggests that probably "Hunlaf had died in the fight at the castle — the sword had been used with the Jutes — and his son asked for revenge." Meanwhile, Guthlaf and Oslaf/Ordlaf, presumably the same pair who held Door A in the siege, go back to the Danish people and tell them what has occurred.

The Beowulf poet says that as a consequence, without naming the antecedents, Finn and all the Frisians were slaughtered. Most likely the antecedents are both of the actions described above, that Hengest and a returning faction of Danes banded together in force to slaughter Finn and the remnants of his forces, avenge Hnæf, pillage Finnsburg, and return to the Danish people with Hildeburh. This is usually understood to mean that Hengest had been brooding over whether fealty or oaths were strongest, and that he and the Danes broke the terms of the peace treaty, though Zocco argues otherwise.

== Eotena ==
=== Jutes or giants? ===
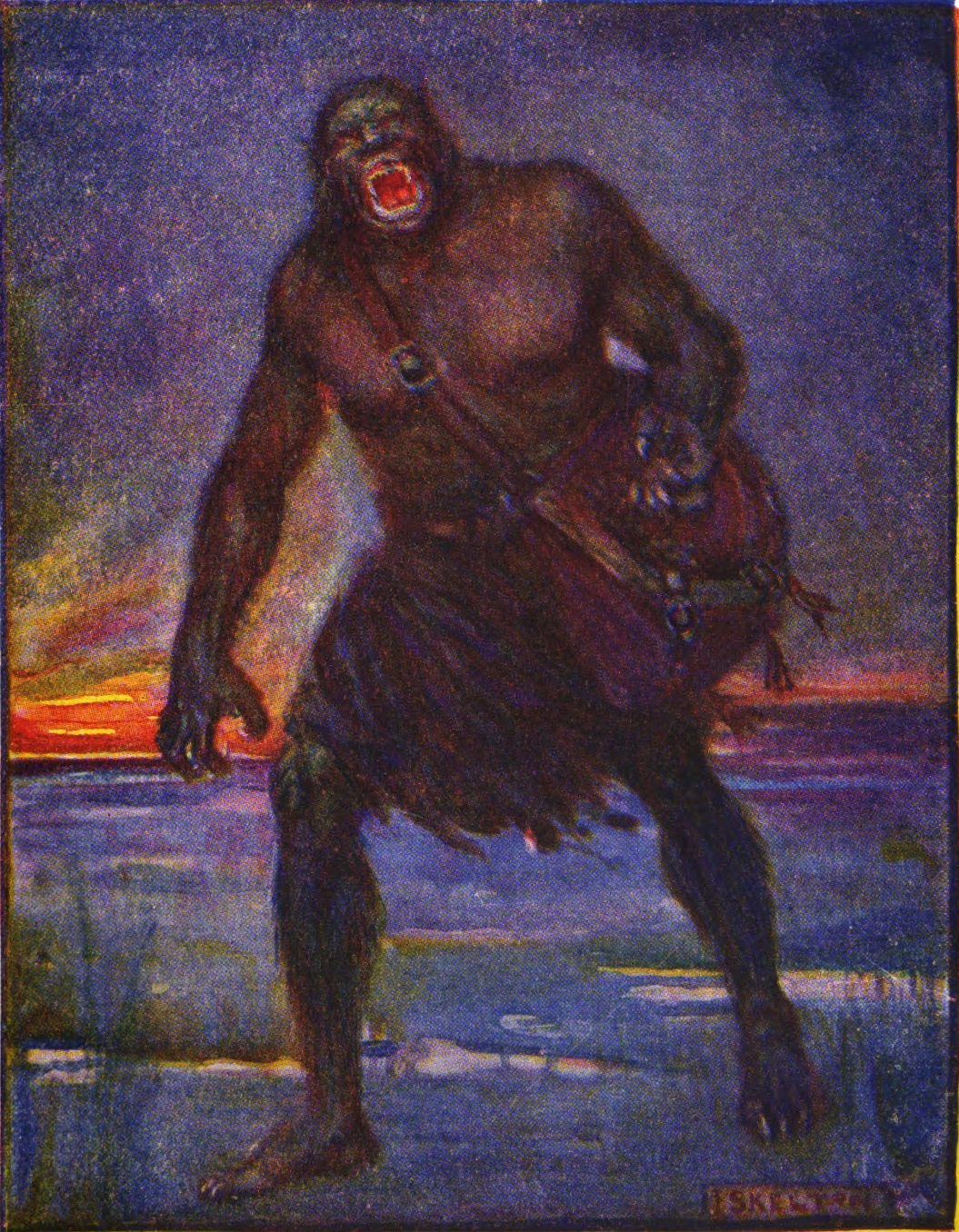
Illustration by J. R. Skelton (1908) of the giant Grendel from earlier in Beowulf. See also a list of artistic depictions of Grendel.

The words eotena and eotenum in the Beowulf episode appear in several places to describe the opponents of the Danes:

- At the beginning of the episode, Hildeburh is said to have "had no need to praise" the eotena good faith (lines 1071–2).
- When a hall is cleared out for Hengest and his men to inhabit as part of the peace treaty terms, he is to share it with Folcwalda's son (Finn), and the eotena sons (line 1088).
- Hengest broods on revenge against the eotena sons, wanting to remind them of his sword (line 1141).
- When the hunlafing sword is placed on Hengest's lap, it is said to be "not unknown" to the eotenum (line 1145).

This has given rise to three basic theories about the term eoten- in Beowulf:

1. The term is a corrupted declension of *Eotan (English: Jutes).
2. The term is a pun, meaning eoten (English: giant) but referring to Jutes.
3. The term is a metaphor, meaning eoten but referring to Frisians.

The first theory was held by Tolkien in the early 20th century, and is now widely accepted amongst scholars. But the second and third theories have seen increasing popularity; more recent dissenters include Williams, Kaske, Gwara, and Vickrey. As three Beowulf editors wrote in 2008:

The terms for Frisians and Jutes seem to be used interchangeably in the Episode (see Beo 1088 and 1093), but it is impossible to be certain, given the fragmentary and allusive nature of the evidence, and the alternate ways of construing the term eotenas that has been thought to designate the Jutes. Historically, scholarship has favored the assumption that MS eotena and eotenum refer to Jutes […], though quite a few scholars, especially in recent years, have seen here common nouns referring to giants

=== Arguments for giants ===
The dissatisfaction with the first theory, of the Eotan or Jutes, can be perceived along two axes: morphological and semantic. Vickrey summarises the morphological evidence for a reading of giants, the numbers referring to Beowulf line numbers:

the form eotena, the expected genitive plural of eoten 'giant' (eotena 421, 883), is anomalous as a declensional form of *Eote, *Eotan 'Jutes'; and the form eotenum, along with eotenum 902, the expected dative plural of eoten 'giant,' a disyllabic masculine noun with a short first syllable, is, as a dative plural of *Eote, *Eotan 'Jutes,' without parallel elsewhere in the poem either in weak nouns or i-nouns. […] On philological grounds, then, it is more likely that eoten- meant 'giant' and not 'Jute' in the Finn Episode: if 'Jute,' eoten- is suspect and doubtful; if 'giant,' expected and normal.

Vickrey's point about eotenum refers to line 1145, where the dative plural eotenum is used. The dative plural for Jutes would be eotum, whereas eotenum is the correct dative plural for the sense of giants; despite this, the word in this line is still often translated "Jutes" in accordance with the first theory. Williams argued of eoten that "it is not fact but only possibility that the scribe confused therewith the tribal name, or that this tribal name had a dative Éotenum. A possibility cannot upset a fact!"

Understanding whether the references are to Jutes or giants has a large bearing on the presented social dynamic of the battle. In a more cautious appraisal Fry summarises that "Whoever the eoten- are, they are probably not Danes and not subject to Hengest."

== See also ==
- Anglo-Saxons
- Battle of Brunanburh
- Battle of Maldon
- Germanic hero
- Germanic Iron Age
- Germanic kingship
- List of legendary kings of Denmark
- Migration Period
- Old English literature
- Tribes of Widsith

== Bibliography ==
- Bjork; Fulk; Niles, eds. (2008), Klaeber's Beowulf and The Fight at Finnsburg, University of Toronto Press, ISBN 9780802098436
- Blair, Peter Hunter (2003), An Introduction to Anglo-Saxon England, Cambridge University Press, ISBN 9780521537773
- Fry, Donald K. (1974), Finnsburh: Fragment and Episode, Taylor & Francis
- Gwara, Scott (2008), Heroic Identity in the World of Beowulf, BRILL, ISBN 978-9004171701
- Liuzza, R. M. (2000), Beowulf: a New Verse Translation, Broadview
- Marsden, Richard (2004), The Cambridge Old English Reader, Cambridge University Press, ISBN 9780521456128
- Olivieri, Federico (1934), Beowulf, Torino: Edizioni Dell'Erma
- Slade, Benjamin, Explanatory Notes on Beowulf
- Sturluson, Snorri (2005), Jesse L. Byock (ed.), The Prose Edda, Penguin
- Suzuki, Seiichi (2000), The Quoit Brooch Style and Anglo-Saxon Settlement: a Casting and Recasting, Boydell & Brewer, ISBN 9780851157498
- Tolkien, J. R. R. (2006), Alan Bliss (ed.), Finn and Hengest, Harper Collins
- Vickrey, John F. (2009), Beowulf and the Illusion of History, University of Delaware Press, ISBN 9780980149661
- Williams, R. A. (1974), The Finn Episode in Beowulf
- Zocco, Nicola (2007), "The Episode of Finn in Beowulf. Discharging Hengest" (PDF), Linguistica e Filologia, 24: 65–83
