= Treaty between Hierapytna and Priansos =

Legal agreement between Hierapytna and Priansos

The treaty between Hierapytna and Priansos was an early 2nd-century BCE legal agreement in which the Cretan cities of Hierapytna and Priansos established isopoliteia, or common citizenship, between their communities.

The text stipulates that any individual could bring charges against any other person accused of infringing upon the common law between the cities. If the prosecutor won their case—they would receive one-third of the fine imposed upon the defendant, while the remainder of the fine would be distributed to the cities. The text specifies that any individual was vulnerable to prosecution under this law, be they a private citizen or a "κόσμος" ("kósmos"), which the Hellenist Shiela Ager interprets as denoting a person who acted "in a public capacity." It is stated within the text that the legal proceedings are to occur within a "κοινόν δικαστήριον" ("koinón dikastḗrion"), a legal body whose structure or powers remain unknown. The classicist Maurice Van Der Mijnsbrugge argues that the "dikastḗrion" may have only been responsible for determining the guilt—not deciding the penalty. Mijnsbrugge notes that the inscription tasks the plaintiff with establishing the fine to be imposed should the defendant be proven guilty. These fines may, according to Mijnsbrugge, connect to the fines mentioned in a "code of the Cretans" described in another treaty between the Cretan cities of Gortyn and Lato.

The term "dikastḗrion" is mentioned once more as the entity which—after having been chosen by both cities—would host legal proceedings to resolve preexisting disputes between the cities. These trials were to be established by the kósmoi serving with a certain "Enipas" and "Neon." Within a later passage, the inscription mentions another dikastḗrion that may have also been involved in the proceedings in some manner. The full phrase, "περὶ δέ τῶ δικαστερίω" ("perì dé tô dikasteríō") is difficult to interpret and has various translations. Classical Archaeologists such as Henri van Effenterre and Shiela Ager argue that the text likely is trying to communicate that, should the initial arbitration fail, the dikastḗrion would assume control over the trial proceedings. Some scholars, such the archaeologist Margherita Guarducci, argue that the presence of the definite article "τῶ" ("tô") may indicate that the specified dikastḗrion was identical with the previously mentioned body of the same name.

Future disputes were to be settled first by a "Πρόδικος" ("Pródikos"), who may have functioned as some variety of arbiter, and was—according to the text—bound to settle disputes according to the "διάγραμμα" ("diágramma"). It is unclear exactly what defined the "diágramma," although it is often interpreted as some sort of overarching code of laws in effect throughout ancient Crete. Following this decree, the text includes mentions a third legal entity referred to as the "ἐπικριτήριον" ("epikritḗrion"), which was set to be established within a city chosen by the kosmoi of the given year. Mijnsbrugge suggests that the "epikritḗrion" may have served as a type of arbitral court within which the "pródikos" functioned.

The law permits the residents of each city to freely utilize any nearby grazing land. However, if one individual were to damage the land in some manner, then they would be subject to the proper fine allotted by the city in which the crime occurred. Additionally, the text allows for citizens of either city to transport their goods—or the "produce" ("καρποί," karpoí) of their goods—to "safety" within the other city, where they were then free to export or sell the materials without paying customs. Angelos Chaniotis, a Greek classicist, argues that the primary beneficiaries of this law would likely have been shepherds and pirates. According to Chaniotis, shepherds—as they were often situated near the frontiers of settled area—were likely vulnerable to warfare, and thus may feel the need to transport their goods into the "safety" of another city. Likewise, this provision may have allowed for pirates to securely deposit or sell stolen items in these cities. Moreover, Chaniotis suggests that the "produce" of the goods could refer to the offspring of livestock or of individuals captured by pirates.

== Text ==
In Ancient Greek:

[θ]εὸς ἀγαθ[ός].

ἀγαθᾶι τύχαι καὶ ἐπὶ σωτηρίαι, ἐπὶ κόσμ[ων ἐν μὲν]
Ἱεραπύτναι τῶν σὺν Ἐνίπαντι τῶ Ἑρμαΐω μ̣[ηνὸς]
Ἱμαλίω, ἐν δὲ Πριανσιοῖ ἐπὶ κόσμων τῶν σὺ[ν Νέωνι τῶ]
Χιμάρω καὶ μηνὸς Δρομηίω. vac. τάδε συνέθε[ντο καὶ συνευ]-
δόκησαν ἀλλάλοις Ἱεραπύτνιοι καὶ Πριάνσιοι [ἐμμένον]-
τες ἐν ταῖς προϋπαρχώσαις στάλαις ἰδίαι τε [τᾶι κειμέναι]
Γορτυνίοις καὶ Ἱεραπυτνίοις καὶ τᾶι κατὰ κοινὸν̣ [Γορτυνίοις]
καὶ Ἱεραπυτνίοις καὶ Πριανσίοις καὶ ἐν τᾶι φιλίαι [καὶ συμμα]-
χίαι καὶ ὅρκοις τοῖς προγεγονόσι ἐν ταύταις τ[αῖς πόλεσι]
καὶ ἐπὶ τᾶι χώραι ἇι ἑκάτεροι ἔχοντες καὶ κρατόν[τες τὰν συν]-
θήκαν ἔθεντο ἐς τὸν πάντα χρόνον. vac. Ἱεραπυτν̣[ίοις]
καὶ Πριανσίο<ι>ς ἦμεν παρ’ ἀλλάλοις ἰσοπολιτείαν καὶ ἐπιγα-
μίας καὶ ἔνκτησιν καὶ μετοχὰν καὶ θείων καὶ ἀνθρωπίνων
πάντων, ὅσοι κα ἔωντι ἔμφυλοι παρ’ ἑκατέροις, καὶ πωλόν-
τας καὶ ὠνωμένος καὶ δανείζοντας καὶ δανειζομένος
καὶ τἆλλα πάντα συναλλάσσοντας κυρίος ἦμεν κατὰ
τὸς ὑπάρχοντας παρ’ ἑκατέροις νόμος. vac. ἐξέστω δὲ τῶι
τε Ἱεραπυτνίωι σπείρεν ἐν τᾶι Πριανσίαι καὶ τῶι Πριαν-
σιεῖ ἐν τᾶι Ἱεραπυτνίαι διδῶσι τὰ τέλεα καθάπερ οἱ ἄλλοι
πολῖται κατὰ τὸς νόμος τὸς ἑκατέρη κειμένος. vac. εἰ δέ τί
κα ὁ Ἱεραπύτνιος ὑπέχθηται ἐς Πρίανσ{ι}ον {²⁶Πρίανσον}²⁶ ἢ ὁ Πριανσιεὺς
ἐς Ἱεράπυτναν ὁτιοῦν, ἀτελέα ἔστω καὶ ἐσαγομένωι καὶ
ἐξαγομένωι αὐτὰ καὶ τούτων τὸς καρπὸς καὶ κατὰ γᾶν
καὶ κατὰ θάλασσαν· ὧν δέ κα ἀποδῶται κατὰ θάλασσαν ἐώ-
σας ἐξαγωγᾶς τῶν ὑπεχθεσίμων ἀποδότω τὰ τέλεα
κατὰ τὸς νόμος τὸς ἑκατέρη κειμένος. vac. κατὰ ταὐτὰ δὲ
καὶ εἴ τίς κα νέμ̣[ηι ἀτε]λὴς ἔστω· αἰ δέ κα σίνηται ἀποτεισά-
τω τὰ ἐπιτίμια [ὁ] σι[νό]μενος κατὰ τὸς νόμος τὸς ἑκατέρη κει-
μένος. πρειγήια δὲ ὧ [κ]α χρείαν ἔχηι πορηίω παρεχόντων
οἱ μὲν Ἱεραπύτνιοι κόσμοι τοῖς Πριανσεῦσι, οἱ δὲ Πριανσιέ<ε>ς
κόσμοι τοῖς Ἱεραπυτνίοις· αἰ δὲ μὴ παρίσχαιεν, ἀποτεισάν-
των οἱ ἐπίδαμοι τῶν κόσμων τᾶι πρειγείαι στατῆρας δέκα.
ὁ δὲ κόσμος ὁ τῶν Ἱεραπυτνίων ἑρπέτω ἐν Πριανσιοῖ ἐς
τὸ ἀρχεῖον καὶ ἐν ἐκκλησίαι καθήσθω μετὰ τῶν κόσμων,
ὡσαύτως δὲ καὶ ὁ τῶν Πριανσιέων κόσμος ἑρπέτω ἐν Ἱε-
ραπύτναι ἐς τὸ ἀρχεῖον καὶ ἐν ἐκκλησίαι καθήσθω μετὰ
τῶν κόσμων. ἐν δὲ τοῖς Ἡραίοις καὶ ἐν ταῖς ἄλλαις ἑορταῖς
οἱ παρατυγχάνοντες ἑρπόντων παρ’ ἀλλάλος ἐς ἀνδρήι-
ον καθὼς καὶ οἱ ἄλλοι πολῖται. ἀναγινωσκόντων δὲ τὰν
στάλαν κατ’ ἐνιαυτὸν οἱ τόκ’ ἀεὶ κοσμόντες παρ’ ἑκατέ-
ροις ἐν τοῖς Ὑπερβώιοις καὶ προπαραγγελόντων ἀλλά-
λοις πρὸ ἁμερᾶν δέκα ἤ κα μέλλωντι ἀναγινώσκεν.
ὁποῖοι δέ κα μὴ ἀναγνῶντι ἢ μὴ παραγγήλωντι ἀπο-
τεισάντων οἱ αἴτιοι τούτων στατῆρας ἑκατόν, οἱ μὲν
Ἱεραπύτνιοι κόσμοι τῶν Πριανσιέων τᾶι πόλει, οἱ δὲ
Πριανσιέες Ἱεραπυτνίων τᾶι πόλει. vac. αἰ δέ τις ἀδικοίη
τὰ συνκείμενα κοινᾶι διαλύων ἢ κόσμος ἢ ἰδιώτας, ἐ-
ξέστω τῶι βωλομένωι δικάξασθαι ἐπὶ τῶ κοινῶ δι-
καστηρίω τίμαμα ἐπιγραψάμενον τᾶς δίκας κατὰ τὸ
ἀδίκημα ὅ κά τις ἀδικήσηι· καὶ εἴ κα νικάσηι, λαβέτω τὸ
τρίτον μέρος τᾶς δίκας ὁ δικαξάμενος, τὸ δὲ λοιπὸν ἔσ-
τω τᾶν πόλεων. αἰ δέ τι θεῶν βωλομένων ἕλοιμεν ἀγα-
θὸν ἀπὸ τῶν πολεμίων, ἢ κοινᾶι ἐξοδούσαντες ἢ ἰδίαι τι-
νὲς παρ’ ἑκατέρων ἢ κατὰ γᾶν ἢ κατὰ θάλασσαν, λαν-
χανόντων ἑκάτεροι κατὰ τὸς ἄνδρας τὸς ἕρποντας
καὶ τὰς δεκάτας λαμβανόντων ἑκάτεροι ἐς τὰν ἰδί-
αν πόλιν. ὑπὲρ δὲ τῶν προγεγονότων παρ’ ἑκατέροις
ἀδικημάτων ἀφ’ ὧ τὸ κοινοδίκιον ἀπέλιπε χρόνω, ποιη-
σάσθων τὰν διεξαγωγὰν οἱ σὺν Ἐνίπαντι καὶ Νέωνι κό[σ]-
μοι ἐν ὧι κα κοινᾶι δόξηι δικαστηρίῳ ἀμφοτέραις ταῖς πό-
λεσι ἐπ’ αὐτῶν κοσμόντων καὶ τὸς ἐγγύος καταστασάν-
των ὑπὲρ τούτων ἀφ’ ἇς κα ἁμέρας ἁ στάλα τεθῆι ἐμ μη-
νί. ὑπὲρ δὲ τῶν ὕστερον ἐγγινομένων ἀδικημάτων προ-
δίκωι μὲν χρήσθων καθὼς τὸ διάγραμμα ἔχει· περὶ δὲ τῶ
δικαστηρίω οἱ ἐπιστάμενοι κατ’ ἐνιαυτὸν παρ’ ἑκατέροις
κόσμοι πόλιν στανυέσθων ἅγ κα ἀμφοτέραις ταῖς πόλεσ[ι]
[δό]ξηι ἐξ ἇς τὸ ἐπικριτήριον τέλεται, καὶ ἐγγύος καθιστάν-
των ἀφ’ ἇς κα ἁμέρας ἐπιστᾶντι ἐπὶ τὸ ἀρχεῖον ἐν διμήνωι,
καὶ διεξαγόντων ταῦτα ἐπ’ αὐτῶν κοσμόντων κατὰ τὸ
δοχθὲν κοινᾶι σύμβολον. αἰ δέ κα μὴ ποιήσωντι οἱ κόσμοι κα-
θὼς γέγραπται, ἀποτεισάτω ἕκαστος αὐτῶν στατῆρας
πεντήκοντα, οἱ μὲν Ἱεραπύτνιοι κόσμοι Πριανσίων τᾶι πόλει,
οἱ δὲ Πριάνσιοι κόσμοι Ἱεραπυτνίων τᾶι πόλει. αἰ δέ τί κα
δόξηι ἀμφοτέραις ταῖς πόλεσι βωλουομέναις ἐπὶ τῶι
κοινᾶι συμφέροντι διορθώσασθαι, κύριον ἔστω τὸ διορ-
θωθέν. στασάντων δὲ τὰς στάλας οἱ ἐνεστακότες ἑ-
κατέρηι κόσμοι ἐπ’ αὐτῶν κοσμόντων, οἱ μὲν Ἱεραπύ-
τνιοι ἐν τῶι ἱερῶι τᾶς Ἀθαναίας τᾶς Πολιάδος καὶ οἱ
Πριάνσιοι ἐν τῶι ἱερῶι τᾶς Ἀθαναίας τᾶς Πολιάδος.
ὁπότεροι δέ κα μὴ στάσωντι καθὼς γέγραπται ἀπο-
τεισάντων τὰ αὐτὰ πρόστιμα καθότι καὶ περὶ τῶν

δικαίων γέγραπται.
