= Finn and Hengest =

1982 essay by J. R. R. Tolkien

Finn and Hengest: The Fragment and the Episode
- Book cover of the 1998 Firebird Distributing paperback edition
- Editor: Alan J. Bliss
- Author: J. R. R. Tolkien
- Language: English
- Subject: Finn and Hengest in a historic context
- Genre: Literature analysis
- Publisher: George Allen & Unwin
- Publication date: 1982
- Publication place: United Kingdom
- Media type: Print (hardback and paperback)
- Pages: 192 (paperback)
- ISBN: 0-0482-9003-3
- Preceded by: Mr. Bliss
- Followed by: The Monsters and the Critics, and Other Essays

Finn and Hengest is a study by J. R. R. Tolkien, edited by Alan Bliss and published posthumously in book form in 1982.

Finn and Hengest are two Anglo-Saxon heroes appearing in the Old English epic poem Beowulf and in the fragment of "The Fight at Finnsburg". Hengest has sometimes been identified with the Jutish king of Kent. He and his brother Horsa (the names meaning "stallion" and "horse") were the legendary leaders of the first Anglo-Saxon immigrants to Britain as mercenaries in the 5th century.

== Synopsis ==
Hnæf, son of Hoc Half-Dane, is the lord of a Danish people who have conquered part of Jutland (probably the northern part of the Cimbrian Peninsula) and exiled its former Jutish rulers. Finn, king of Frys-Land (modern-day Friesland in the Netherlands) has allowed dispossessed Jutes to settle in his lands and enter his service. Finn marries Hnæf's older sister Hildeburh, and sends their son (whose name was probably Friðuwulf) to be fostered in Hnæf's household.

Around the year AD 450, Hnæf sails to Frys-Land in the autumn, His purpose is to return Finn's now-grown son and spend the winter in Finn's citadel, celebrating Yule. Hnæf brings a retinue of some sixty thanes. Chief among these thanes is a Jute named Hengest, leader of a band of Jutes who have taken service under Hnæf. Unfortunately, and foreseen by no one, when they arrive at Finn's stronghold they find that many of Finn's thanes are also Jutes, particularly one Garulf, who seems to be the rightful heir to the kingdom conquered by Hnæf's people; and these Frisian Jutes are at blood feud with Hengest and his band, because Hengest supports the conquering Danes, if for no other reason. This would explain why Hildeburh "had no cause to praise the fealty of the Jutes," since that fealty led to the re-awakening of the feud, which killed her brother, husband, and son.

Finn (who seems guiltless in Tolkien's interpretation) tries to prevent trouble by separating the parties, and allowing Hnæf and his thanes to occupy the royal hall, while he removes his own thanes to a different building. However, the Frisian Jutes make a pre-dawn attack, hoping to take Hengest and his band by surprise. But the Danes have been expecting trouble, and a watchman sees the light of their approaching torches. He asks rhetorically, "What is this light? Is it the dawn in the East, or is it the flight of a dragon, or are the gables burning?" Hnæf answers, "Neither is this the dawn in the East, nor is it the flight of a dragon, nor are the gables of this hall burning," it is an attack. Prepared, the Danes and Hengest's Jutes barricade the two doors of the hall against attack. Garulf is warned by one Guðhere not to risk his "precious life" in the assault, but he attacks and is the first to fall. Finn's Frisian thanes, who have ties of marriage and friendship to Finn's Jutish thanes, join in the fight against the Danes. The Danes hold the hall for five days without losing a man. On the morning of the fifth day the Frisians force their way into the hall, and in the battle, both Hnæf and Friðiwulf are killed. (It is not clear which side Friðiwulf was fighting on, but Tolkien thinks it likely he was staying in the hall with Hnæf, his foster-father and uncle; this would explain why Beowulf emphasises that Friðiwulf was laid on the funeral pyre at Hnæf's side.) The surviving Danes, and those Jutes allied with Hengest, drive the Frisians and Jutes out of the hall and re-barricade the door.

At this point Finn (who may not have joined in the fight personally) intervenes and offers to make a bargain with the survivors. As Tolkien points out, the Danes now had several advantages:

1. Finn had lost so many men that he could not force his way into the hall again.
2. The Danes were occupying his royal hall, and he was unwilling to burn it to get them out.
3. Finn must have felt both guilty and ashamed that his feuding thanes had killed Hnæf, who was his brother-in-law and guest.

Inside the hall, the survivors gather in two groups: Danes, led by a chief thane who is described as Hunlafing ("the son of Hunlaf") and Jutes, led by Hengest. The Jutes are Hengest's own band, and owed loyalty to Hnæf only because Hengest followed him. Finn at first tries to make peace with the Danes only, but the Danes loyally insist that any peace agreement must include Hengest and his men. Finn agrees, and swears an oath of peace: the Danes and Hengest's men will lay down their arms, and since they cannot leave Frys-Land until the winter ends, they will sit at Finn's table and technically accept him as their protector (since he was now their only possible source of food and maintenance, and they had intended to be his guests throughout the winter anyway.) Finn gives the Danes a separate hall to dwell in for the winter, specifying that they shall share it with the sons of the Jutes (meaning Hengest and his band.) He also swears that any one of his own thanes who tries to renew the feud (by taunting the Danes that they now follow the slayer of their lord) will be punished, possibly with death, by Finn himself. The bodies of Hnæf and Friðiwulf are honourably burned.

Over the winter, the Danes and their Jutish allies brood over the fall of Hnæf. Hengest is faced with a conflict of duty: whether to honour the peace-treaty with Finn, or to honour his duty to avenge his fallen lord. Finally the son of Hunlaf takes a sword Hildeleoma ("Battleflame") which was probably Hnæf's sword, and lays it in Hengest's lap. Hengest "does not refuse the world's counsel" (that is, he goes along with what everyone agrees is right) and decides that his loyalty to Hnæf must outweigh his obligation to Finn. (In any case, Tolkien points out that we do not see Hengest swearing any oath to Finn; we only see Finn swearing oaths to Hengest and the Danes.) When the spring comes, the Danes sail home and tell the story of the downfall of Hnæf. They return to Finn's stronghold in force. Hengest, having remained in Frys-Land under the guise of upholding the terms of the peace-treaty, opens the gates to the invaders and the Danes sack Finn's stronghold, kill Finn and all his men, loot and burn the city and return home, taking Hildeburh with them.

== Analysis ==
The book is based on an edited series of lectures Tolkien made before and after World War II. In his lectures, Tolkien argued that the Hengest of "The Fight at Finnsburg" and Beowulf was a historical rather than a legendary figure, and that these works record episodes from an orally composed and transmitted history of the Hengest named in the Anglo-Saxon Chronicle. This view has gained acceptance from some medieval historians and Anglo-Saxon scholars, both since Tolkien's initial lectures and since the publication of this posthumous collection.

Tolkien's lectures describe what he called the "Jutes-on-both-sides theory", which was his explanation for the puzzling occurrence of the word ēotenas in the episode in Beowulf. Tolkien read the word as Jutes, and theorised that the fight was a purely Jutish feud, and Finn and Hnæf were simply caught up by circumstance. Tolkien explained both their presence and their ambiguous loyalty with his interpretation of the story. Recent scholarship has examined how Tolkien's views on Hengest have influenced his fictionalization of early English origins in his legendarium.

== Bibliography ==
- Tolkien, J. R. R.; Bliss, Alan J. (ed.): Finn and Hengest: The Fragment and the Episode, Houghton Mifflin Company, New York (1983). ISBN 0-395-33193-5
