= Huoching =

Alemannic nobleman

Huoching of Alamannia (c. 675–744) was an Alemannic nobleman. According to the 9th century Vita Hiudowici by Thegan, he was the son of Gotfrid Agilolfing (c. 650–709). Huoching's son Hnabi (Nebi) was the founder of the Ahalolfings dynasty which rose to prominence in Alamannia in the Carolingian period. The Agilofing descent has been doubted in scholarship. Wenskus (497–500) has suggested a connection of Huoching and Hnabi to the historical Nibelungs. Jänichen (1976) compares the father-and-son pair Hoc and Hnaef in Old English heroic poetry (Beowulf, Finnsburgh fragment, Widsith) suggesting that Huoching and Hnabi are the historical template for these names in later heroic poetry. In this, Jänichen is following a suggestion made as early as 1849 by John Mitchell Kemble in History of the Saxons in England (p. 419).
