= Finn (Frisian) =

Phrygian legendary hero

Finn, son of Folcwald
- Reign: c. 400

Finn, son of Folcwald, was a legendary Frisian king. He is mentioned in Widsith, in Beowulf, and in the Finnesburg Fragment. He is named in the Historia Brittonum, while a Finn, given a different father but perhaps intending the same hero, appears in Anglo-Saxon royal pedigrees.

He was married to Hildeburh, a sister of the Danish lord Hnæf, and was killed in a fight with Hnæf's lieutenant Hengest after Hnæf was himself killed by Frisians.

A passage from Beowulf as translated by Seamus Heaney (lines 1089–1090) reads:

"Finn, son of Folcwald,
should honour the Danes,..."

A possible reference to a lost tradition on Finn appears in Snorri Sturluson's Skáldskaparmál. Snorri talks of the animosity between Eadgils and Onela (which also appears in Beowulf), and writes that Aðils (Eadgils) was at war with a Norwegian king named Áli (Onela). Áli died in the war, and Aðils took Áli's helmet Battle-boar and his horse Raven. The Danish berserkers who had helped him win the war demanded three pounds of gold each in pay, and two pieces of armour that nothing could pierce: the helmet battle-boar and the mailcoat Finn's heritage. They also wanted the famous ring Svíagris. Aðils considered the pay outrageous and refused.

Finn, the son of Fodepald (i.e. Folcwald) is also mentioned in the pedigree list of Saxon ancestors of the legendary kings of Kent that appears in Historia Brittonum. The Wessex and Bernician royal genealogies in the Anglo-Saxon Chronicle and Anglian collection instead make the Finn in the royal pedigree son of Godwulf, and it is uncertain whether the same heroic Finn was originally intended. Richard North notes that Folcwalda is "identical with the first element of fólcvaldi goða ('ruler of the host of gods') which is an epithet reserved for Freyr". He also notes similarities with "fólkum stýrir ('he leads peoples', Húsdrápa) which celebrates Freyr".

Finn is a central subject of Finn and Hengest, a study of the Finnesburg Episode by J. R. R. Tolkien, edited by Alan Bliss and published posthumously in book form in 1982.

== See also ==
- Battle of Finnburg

== Sources ==
- Slade, Benjamin. "Translation of Beowulf".
