= Marriage of alliance =

Marriage of alliance may refer to:

- Marriage of state
- Marriage of convenience
