= Marriage of convenience =

Marriage for practical reasons (not love)

A marriage of convenience is a marriage contracted for reasons other than that of love and commitment. Instead, such a marriage is entered into for personal gain, or some other sort of strategic purpose, such as a political marriage. Cases where those married do not intend to live together as a couple, and typically married only for one of them to gain the right to reside in a country, are considered to be sham marriages. In many cultures, it is usual for parents to decide their adult children's marriages; this is called an arranged marriage.

In ancient Roman Egypt (30 BCE to 395 CE), brother-sister marriages were common, comprising an estimated 15–21% of unions, often to keep property within the family.

Marriages of convenience that are sham and arranged marriages that are forced, are against the law in many jurisdictions.

== Legal loophole ==
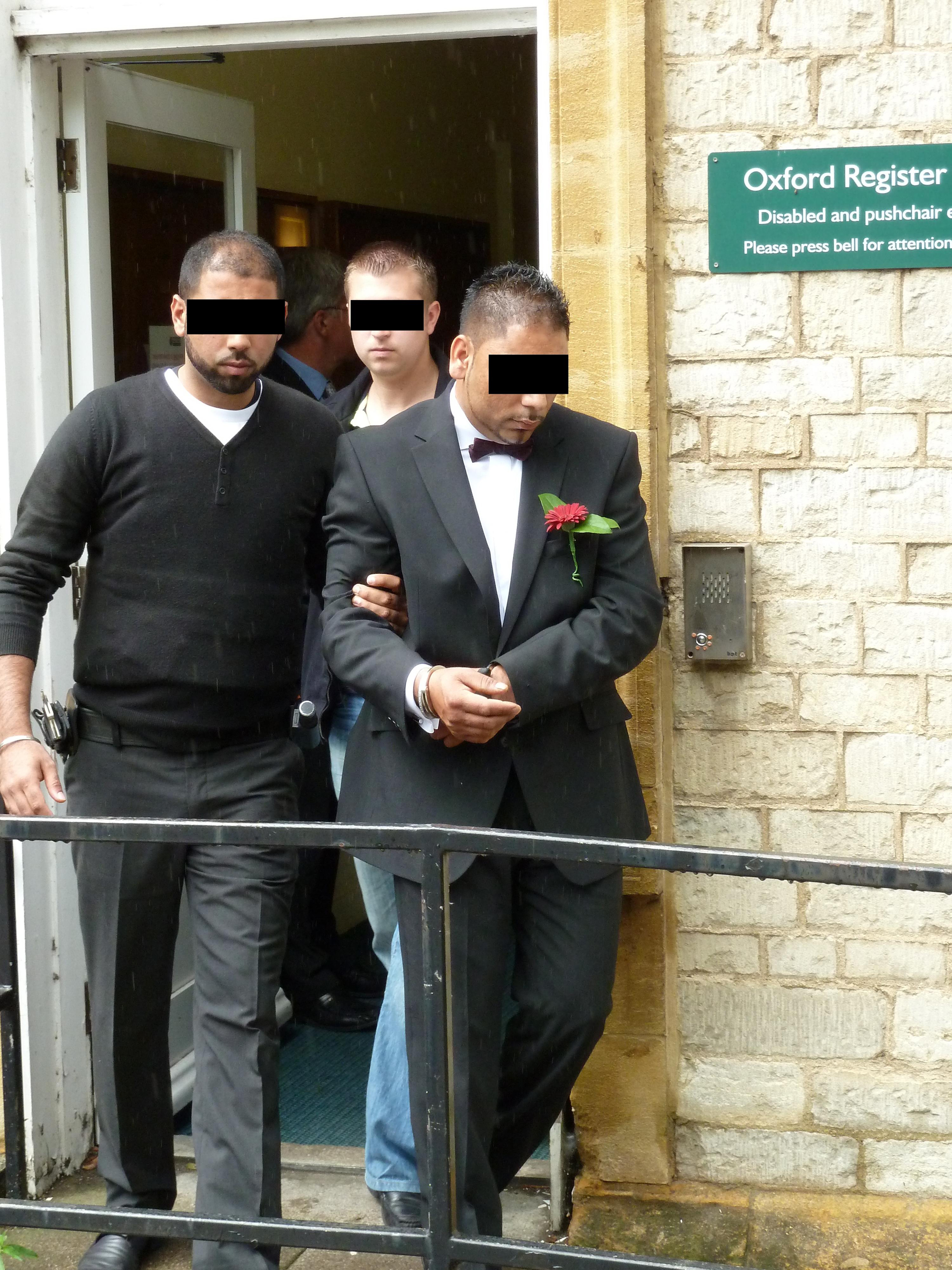
Operation by officers from the UK Border Agency at Oxford Registry Office on 8 June 2010 to stop a suspected sham marriage

Marriages of convenience are often contracted to exploit legal loopholes of various sorts. A couple may wed for one of them to gain citizenship or right of abode, for example, as many countries around the world will grant such rights to anyone married to a resident citizen. In the United States, this practice is known as a green card marriage. In Australia, there have been marriages of convenience to bring attention to the government's Youth Allowance laws. On 31 March 2010 two students were publicly and legally married on the University of Adelaide's lawn so that they could both receive full Youth Allowance. In the United States during the era of the Vietnam War, some couples were wed during the man's time of exposure to the military draft; the couple agreed to no contact, followed by an annulment at the end of the (typically one year) marriage. Advertisements were commonly placed in student newspapers to this effect. Because they exploit legal loopholes, sham marriages of convenience often have legal consequences. For example, U.S. Immigration (USCIS) can punish this with a US$250,000 fine and five-year prison sentence.

The term "contract marriage" is used by U.S. military personnel to describe marrying mainly in order to receive extra pay and housing benefits that the couple would not otherwise be entitled to.

== Homosexuality ==
Another common reason for marriages of convenience is to hide one partner's homosexuality in places where being openly gay is punishable or potentially detrimental. A sham marriage of this type, sometimes called a lavender marriage, is usually performed so that it is generally assumed that the married couple are both heterosexual, preventing negative consequences of LGBT discrimination. Such marriages may have one heterosexual and one gay partner, or two gay partners: a lesbian and a gay man married to each other. In the case where a gay man marries a straight woman, the woman is sometimes said to be his "beard", while in the case where a lesbian marries a straight man, the man is sometimes said to be her "merkin".

== Metaphorical usage ==
The phrase "marriage of convenience" is used metaphorically to mean any partnership between groups or individuals for their mutual (and sometimes illegitimate) benefit, or between groups or individuals otherwise unsuited to working together. An example would be a "national unity government", as existed in Israel during much of the 1980s or in the United Kingdom during World War II. More specifically, cohabitation refers to a political situation which can occur in countries with a semi-presidential system (especially France), where the president and the prime minister belong to opposed political camps.

== Political marriage ==
Marriages of convenience, often termed marriages of state, have always been commonplace in royal, aristocratic, and otherwise powerful families, to make alliances between two powerful houses. Examples include the marriages of Agnes of Courtenay, her daughter Sibylla, Jeanne d'Albret, and Catherine of Aragon. Marriage equality played a major role in princely families, less in England and Scotland than in the monarchies of the continent. Even among the non-ruling nobility, great importance was attached to marriages appropriate to their status.

== Literature ==
The topic was treated literary through Thomas Mann's 1909 novel Royal Highness, which describes a young unworldly and dreamy prince who forces himself into a marriage of convenience that ultimately becomes happy. The story was modeled after Mann's own romance and marriage to Katia Mann in February 1905, which was to be blessed with six children, although it was not reasons of state or equality that motivated this marriage of convenience, but rather the author's homosexuality which made him want acceptance and starting a family (along with, incidentally, the prospect of a rich dowry) at a time when homosexuality was still punishable and ostracized. However, his love for boys remained, but was lived out platonically.

== See also ==
- Abuse
- Basic Allowance for Housing
- Child abuse
- Child neglect
- Child marriage
- Forced marriage
- Lavender marriage
- Marriage of state
- Arranged marriage
