= Priansus =

Town in ancient Crete

Coordinates: 35°02′40″N 25°15′40″E

Priansus or Priansos (Ancient Greek: Πρίανσος), also Pransus or Pransos (Πράνσος), was a town and polis (city-state) in ancient Crete.

== History ==
It is mentioned in a list of Cretan cities cited in a decree of Knossos of about 259–233 BCE, as well as in the list of Cretan cities that signed an alliance with Eumenes II of Pergamon in 183 BCE.

An honorary decree of Priansus dated to 170–140 BCE that includes the dispatch of two ambassadors of Teos in which one of them is specially praised for singing poems from the mythic Cretan cycle.

Priansus minted coins dated from approximately 330–270 BCE bearing the inscription «ΠΡΙΑΝΣΙΕΩΝ» or «ΠΡΙ». Priansos made several treatises with other Cretan poleis, including a treaty of isopoliteia with the polis of Hierapytna (IC III,iii,4).

== Location ==
The site of Priansus is located near modern Kastellos.
