= Witta =

Witta may refer to:

- Witta (Wicca), a witchcraft tradition created by author Edain McCoy
- Witta of Büraburg, a missionary and bishop in 8th-century Germany
- Witta, son of Wecta, a Jutish chieftain in 5th-century sub-Roman Britain
- Witta (Bishop of Lichfield) (before 737 - c. 750)
- Witta, Queensland, a town in the Sunshine Coast Region, Queensland, Australia
- Saint Wite (died c. 831), also known as Saint Witta

== See also ==
- Witan, or Witenagemot, historic English council
