= Incest in ancient Egypt =

Brother-sister incest was a common practice among the Pharaohs of ancient Egypt, both during dynastic and Hellenistic times. Marriages and children between full siblings has been confirmed by genetic testing. Father-daughter incest was also at times accepted during the dynastic period.

Sibling marriages among commoners is found regularly in censuses from the Roman era of Egypt. It is also noted as a part of Egyptian culture by Greek and Roman writers. The nature of these marriages are disputed, with some historians arguing that they can be explained by adoption.

== Royal families ==
Brother-sister marriages among the pharaohs date from at least the 11th Dynasty in 2000 BC. The family trees of the pharaohs are complicated, with the exact parentage of many queens uncertain, but many of them include brother-sister and more rarely father-daughter pairings.

An example is the Eighteenth Dynasty of Egypt. Thutmose I's two children Thutmose II and Hatshepsut married each other and produced a child together named Neferure. Genetic testing on Tutankhamun proves that his parents were full siblings, Akhenaten (or possibly Smenkhare), and the mummy known as The Younger Lady.

Father-daughter marriage was less common. One clear case is Ramses the Great who married at least two of his daughters: Bintanath and Meritamen.

The practice of royal incest was fully adopted by the Greek Ptolemaic dynasty that ruled Egypt for 275 years. Of the fifteen marriages made by the Greek rulers, ten or eleven were to their full sibling. The famed Cleopatra, last queen of Egypt, was married first to her older brother Ptolemy XIII and then to her younger brother Ptolemy XIV.

== Common people ==
It is not clear if sibling-marriages were common outside the royal family in pre-Roman periods. Jaroslav Černý looked at 500 families of the Egyptian elite outside the royal family. He found no clear evidence for incestous marriages.

The most detailed historical records come from the final centuries of ancient Egyptian civilization while the Roman Empire controlled Egypt. The Romans conducted a census every fourteen years. Some of those records have survived giving detailed descriptions of households and the relations of the people living in them. Keith Hopkins did a detailed analysis of those records and found that 15 to 20% of all marriages recorded were between brothers and sisters. These records covered a diverse economic and geographic slice of the population and show that sibling marriage was common in all classes and regions of society in Roman Egypt. Hopkins found 113 marriages recorded in these census documents. Of those 17 were certain sibling marriages, with another 6 probably so. 11 of those cases were full brother-sister. 8 between half brothers and sister. One limitation pointed out by Sabine R. Huebner is that the standard census phrase "wife and sister from the same father and mother" does not rule out adopted siblings who were not blood relations. There are other pieces of evidence. Both wedding and divorce records of sibling marriages survive. Also surviving are wedding invitations: "Dionysius invites you to dinner at the marriage of his own children ... to-morrow, that is the 30th at the 9th hour."

A few scholars have questioned the theory of biological siblings marrying, and argue that the available evidence does not support the view that such relations were common. Huebner among others have argued that these marriages can best be explained by adult adoption of a son-in-law when the family lacks a male heir, but that these documents simply fail to disclose this. Most modern scholars accept that mention of adoption is underrepresented in Roman Egyptian documents despite adoption happening regularly. She notes that while marriage between adopted siblings were prohibited among Roman citizens it was the main motivation for adoption in the Eastern Mediterranean. By adopting a son-in-law the family could pass on their name within the need for a biological son while saving money on a dowry. This is supported by the fact that most records of adoptees from Roman Egypt are of adult males. There is also the fact that other close-kin endogamous unions such as uncle-niece and aunt-nephew marriages do not seem to have been common.

However, Huebner's adoption thesis has itself been criticized, with Sofie Remijsen and Willy Clarysse asserting that neither the household size nor the onomastic pattern in families with brother-sister marriages are consistent with the usual adoption practices of the Eastern Mediterranean. Furthermore, they point out how contemporary authors described brother-sister marriages as a peculiarity of the whole Egyptian population, reinforcing the claim that the marriages found in Roman census records did involve genuine blood-related siblings. Greco-Roman writers including Seneca, Diodorus, and Philo of Alexandria all make mention that according to Egyptian law, unlike that of the Greeks, Romans, and Jews, sibling marriage was legal.

== Effects ==
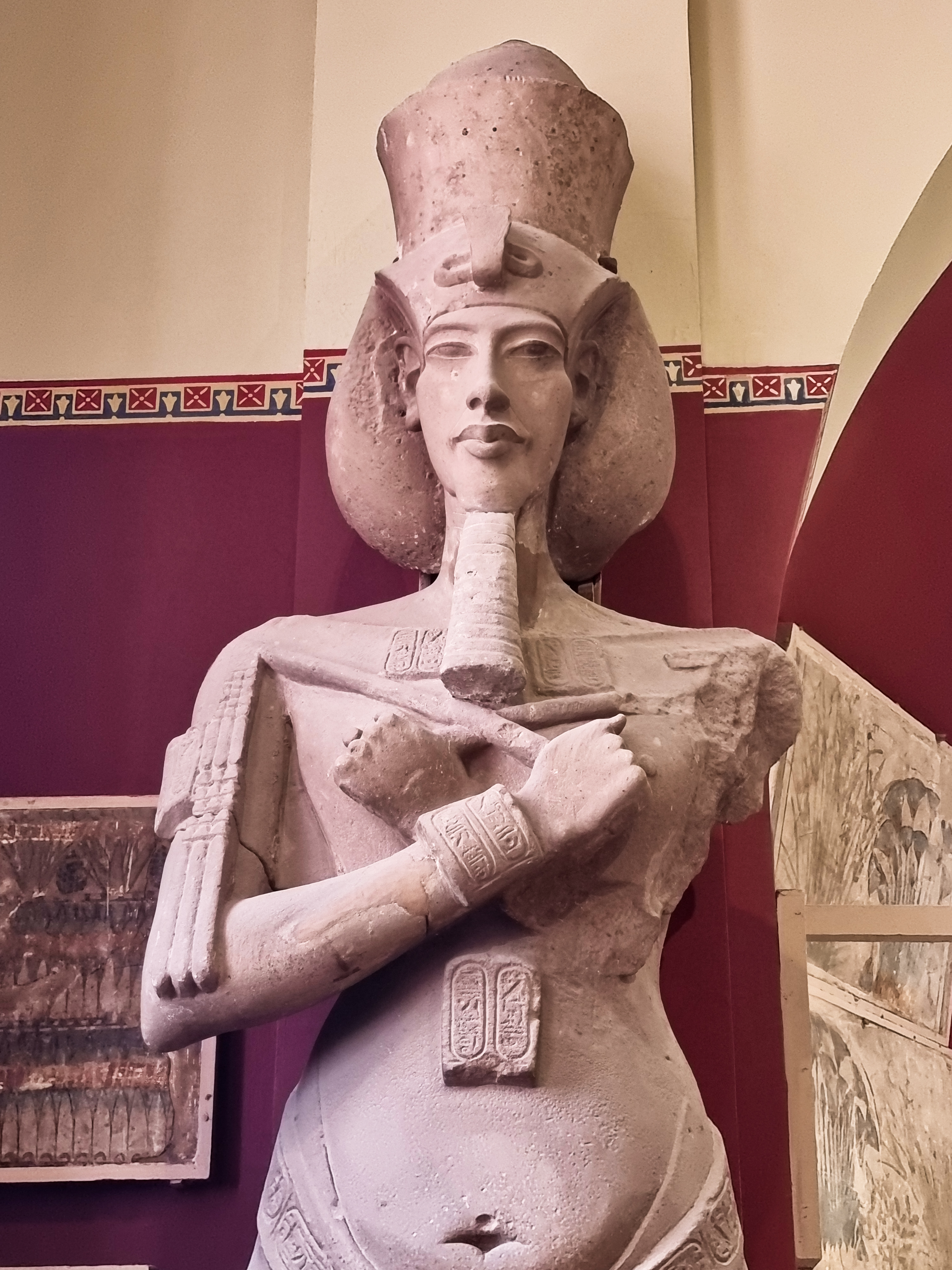
Statue of Akhenaten in the collection of the Egyptian Museum, Cairo

The children of incest are at high risk of genetic abnormalities, but little clear evidence has been found for this in the Egyptian royal line. The unusual depictions of the Pharaoh Akhenaton led to long of speculation of possible genetic disorders, but when his DNA was sequenced there was no evidence found for any genetic diseases.

Scholars have attempted to look for the effects of inbreeding depression on the Ptolemaic dynasty, the royal house with the clearest evidence for generations of close interbreeding. The Ptolemy family showed none of the problems that may result from generations of incest. Sheila Ager points out that, while incest may increase the risk of ill-health, it does not guarantee it.

In societies without high rates of incest the main danger is the inheritance of harmful double recessive traits that cause the most problems. That is because in a society where incest is rare it is common for many people to carry harmful recessive traits to no ill effect. In a society with common incest those traits would become more of a barrier to reproduction and become less common.

== Explanations ==
There have been many attempts to explain the acceptance of incest in Ancient Egypt, with no scholarly consensus as to why the culture was so distinct from human norms.

The chief gods Osiris and Isis were both brother and sister and husband and wife, they were also the parents of the god Horus, though this is also common in other mythologies where incest is not common practice, such as Zeus and Hera. It is also impossible to know if the religion influenced culture or if the culture influenced the religion. The pharaoh, his parents, and children were considered to be gods. The gap between the rulers and nobility was vast, making it hard for the pharaoh to marry anyone not part of his direct family. Similar combinations of divine monarchs and incest are seen in Incan and Hawaiian history. Pharaohs married many women. Their sisters were only one wife among many and many of the heirs were not from family unions.

Among the common population one theory proposed by Hopkins is the relatively strong legal protections for women in Ancient Egypt. Women married late, in the mid 20s as opposed to their mid-teens in the rest of the Roman Empire. Surviving love poems and romantic stories indicate that women could chose who they could marry, rather than it being arranged. Upon the death of a husband the wife, not only the children, would receive a share of the estate. No-fault divorce was the law. Either couple could end a marriage contract and when done so the wife would have claims on some portion of the husbands wealth. Sibling marriages would prevent the risks of a failed marriage stripping a family's wealth.

== Suppression ==
Under the Roman Emperor Caracalla in 212 CE all Egyptians became Roman citizens. This put them under Roman Law rather than traditional Egyptian laws. Since Roman Law forbade incestuous marriages, such marriages disappeared from the public records. That Diocletian 70 years later issued a decree condemning incest hints that the practice was still practiced. By the time Christianity came to Egypt it does seem the practice had vanished. Incest does not appear often among pagan sins attacked by the early Egyptian Christian writers such as Origen.

== See also ==
- Mukoyōshi, Japanese custom of a son-less family adopting an adult male to marry the family's daughter
- Adoption in ancient Rome
