= Hnabi =

Eighth-century Alemannian duke

Hnabi or Nebi (c. 710 – c. 789) was an Alemannian duke. He was the son of Huoching and perhaps a grandson of Duke Gotfrid, which would make him a scion of the Agilolfing dynasty of Bavaria. He was the founder of the "old" line of the Ahalolfings. Around 724, he was one of the joint founders of the monastery of Reichenau.

By his wife Hereswind (Hereswintha) von Bodensee, Hnabi left at least two children, Ruadbert (Rodbert, Robert), who was count in the Hegau, and Imma or Emma (died c. 785), who married Gerold of Anglachgau and was the mother of Eric of Friuli and Hildegard, wife of Charlemagne. Rodbert son of Hnabi is mentioned in a St. Gall document dated 770. Imma is mentioned in documents of Lorsch, Fulda and St. Gall between 779 and 804.

The genealogy of Hildegard is recorded in the ninth-century Vita Hiudowici by Thegan of Trier: "the duke Gotfrid begat Huoching, Huoching begat Hnabi, Hnabi begat Emma, Emma herself the most blessed queen Hildegard" (Gotfridus dux genuit Huochingum, Huochingus genuit Nebi, Nebi genuit Immam, Imma vero Hiltigardem beatissimam reginam). Scholars have cast doubt on Huoching being the son of Gotfrid, comparing the father-and-son pair of Huoching and Hnabi to that of Hoc and Hnaef in Anglo-Saxon tradition.
