= Hierapytna =

Ancient town in Crete

Coordinates: 35°00′24″N 25°44′14″E

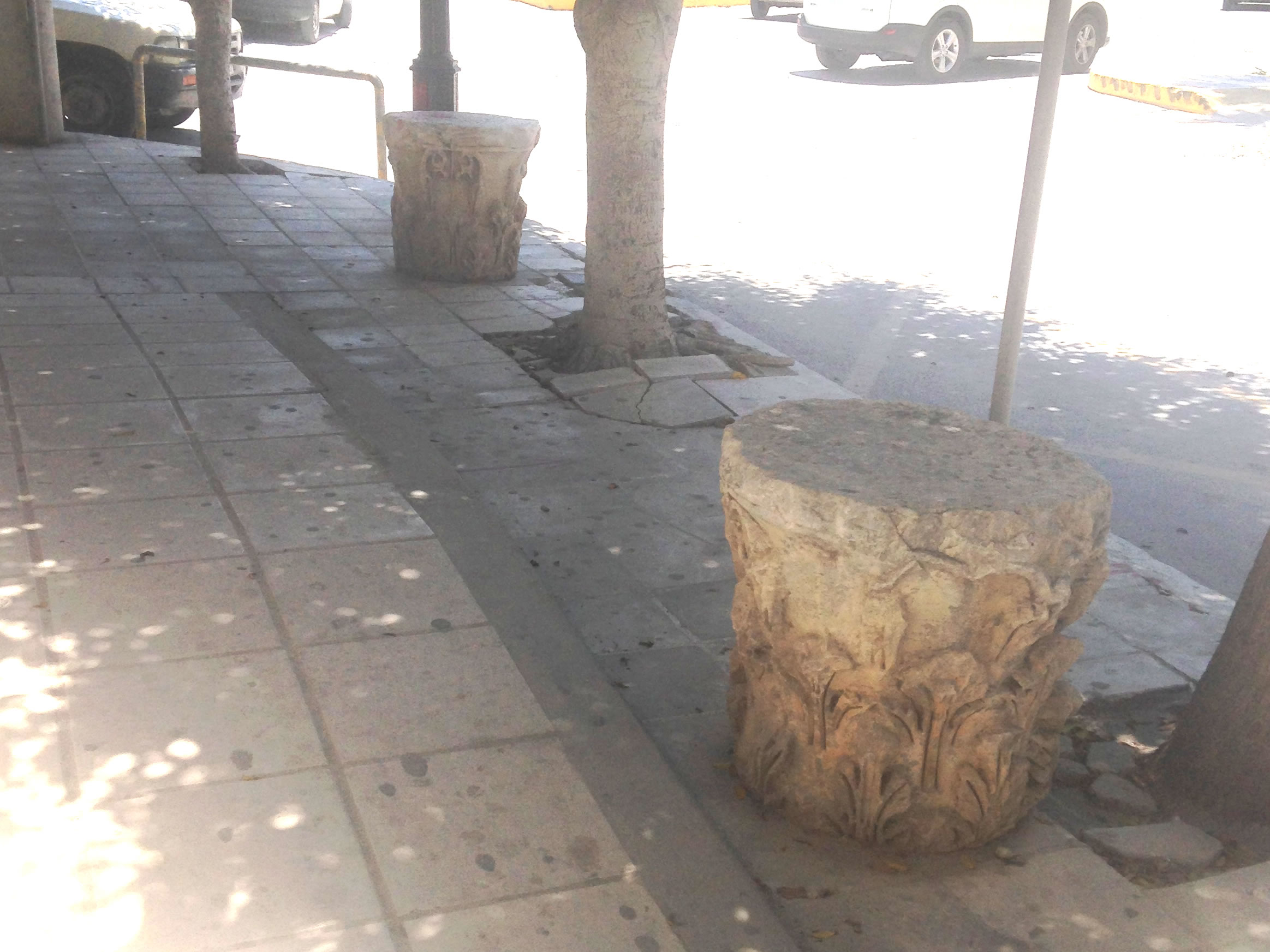
Corinthian capitals from Hierapytna

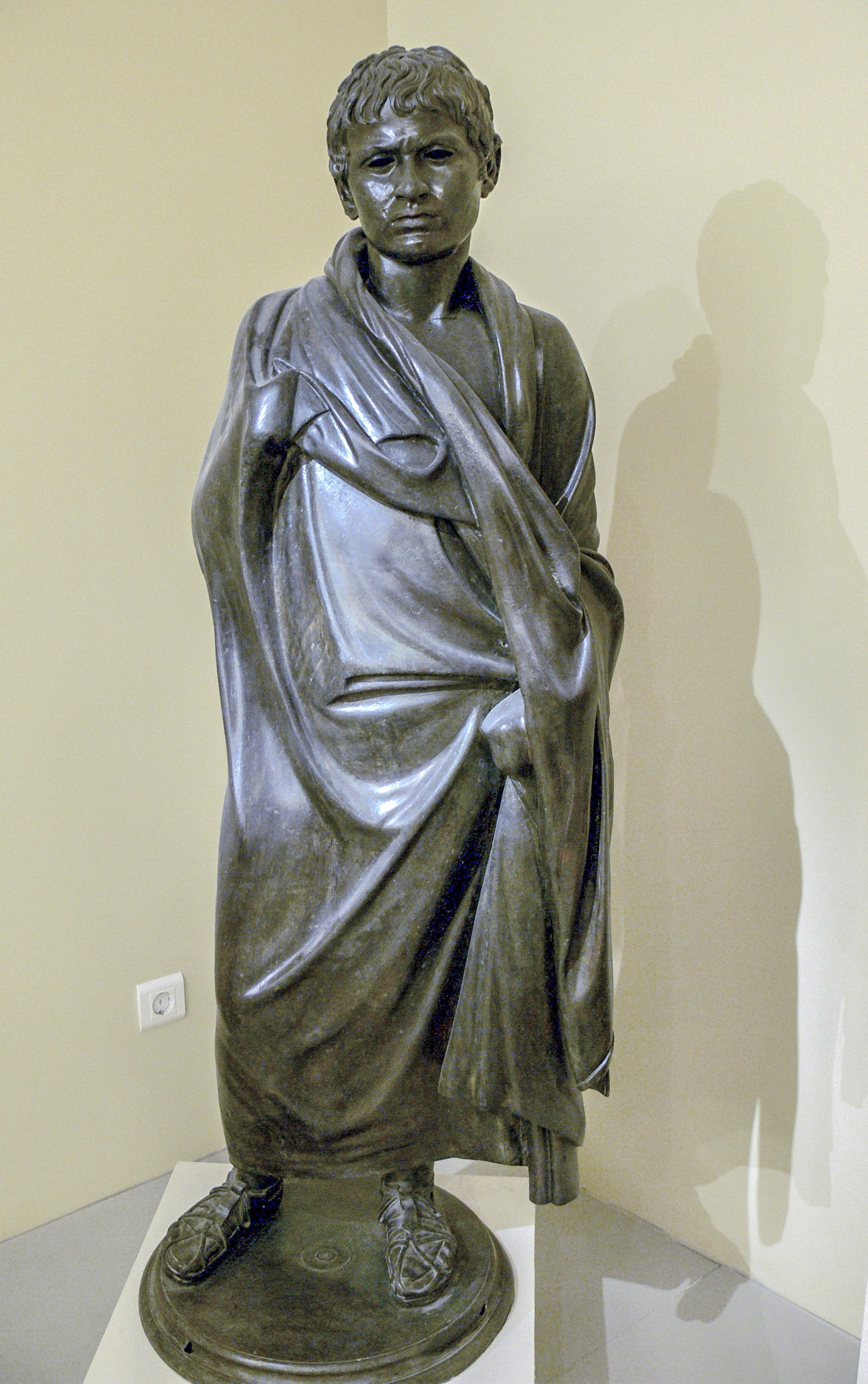
Bronze statue from Hierapytna

Hierapytna (Ancient Greek: Ἱεράπυτνα or Ἱερὰ Πύτνα), also Hierapydna (Ἱεράπυδνα), Hierapydnes (Ἱερά Πύδνης), or Hiera, was a town of ancient Crete. Strabo says that it stood in the narrowest part of the island, opposite Minoa. Hierapytna, according to the Stadiasmus Maris Magni, was 180 stadia from Biennus, which agrees with the distance of 20 M.P. assigned to it by the Peutinger Table. It was a town of great antiquity, and its foundation was ascribed to the Corybantes; it bore the successive names of Cyrba, Pytna, Camirus, and Hierapytna. From an inscription preserved among the Oxford marbles, it appears that the Hierapytnians were at one time allied with the neighbouring city of Priansus. There are both autonomous and Roman Imperial coins belonging to Hierapytna; the symbol on the former is generally a palm tree.

Its site is located near modern Ierapetra.
