= Peace-weaver =

Peace-weavers (Old English: freothwebbe) were Anglo-Saxon women who were married to a member of an enemy tribe for the purpose of establishing peace between feuding groups. It was hoped that by relating two tribes, the animosity between them would be eased as individuals would be reluctant to kill their own flesh and blood.

== History ==
Anglo-Saxons thrived on battle. Politically organized into tribes with local chieftains, Anglo-Saxons were sworn to protect their leaders and had a fierce loyalty to their own tribes. Tacitus said of the Germanic people: "They choose their kings for their noble birth, their leaders for their valour ... Many noble youths, if the land of their birth is stagnating in a protracted peace, deliberately seek out other tribes, where some war is afoot." With this cultural background, peace was difficult to achieve in Anglo-Saxon communities. There were two major ways that the Anglo-Saxons tried to establish peace between tribes. One was weregild, and the other was the creation of peace-weaver. Although tribes attempted to establish peace through these means, their intended goals were rarely met, as fighting was an institution more honorable than peace.

A few scholars believe that the term "peace-weavers" "does not necessarily reflect a Germanic custom of giving a woman in marriage to a hostile tribe in order to secure peace. Rather, it is a poetic metaphor referring to the person whose function it seems to be to perform openly the action of making peace by weaving to the best of her art a tapestry of friendship and amnesty." This argument originates from the idea that the term is used to refer to angels that are sent from God as peace-weavers between God and man. Thus, peace-weaver can have a broader meaning, but when speaking of peace-weavers in literature, the most common discussions revolve around women married to rival tribes in order to establish peace between warring peoples.

== Literature ==
The Anglo-Saxon word for peace-weaver is freothuwebbe (fríÞwebbe). It is a kenning, a literary device common in Anglo-Saxon poetry.

=== Beowulf ===
Two main characters in Beowulf stand as peace-weavers. Wealhþeow is a fairly able peace-weaver inasmuch as a peace-weaver can be effective. She attended to the successes of her husband and sons while providing her daughter as another peace-weaver to a different enemy tribe. The Old English describes Wealhþeow as both a freothuwebbe, or a peace-weaver, and as a frithu-sibb, a peace-pledge. Some scholars consider the minor difference in terms as irrelevant. Others, though, point out the difference distinguishing freothuwebbe as one who weaves peace socially and frithu-sibb as one who creates peace politically. Wealhþeow's role as a peace-weaver is both social and political, and she is clearly effective in both dimensions.

The second character portrayed in the peace-weaving role is Hildeburh. She experiences, unlike Wealhþeow, the destruction of her husband's people (including her own son) and her brother's people. Hildeburh, too, serves as a peace-pledge bringing the Danes and Frisians together. She returned to her home land after her husband's kingdom was destroyed. This history represents the conflict that many peace-weavers felt: with whom should the loyalty lie? Anglo-Saxon tradition says that once married, the peace-weaver's duties and loyalties lie first and foremost with her new husband.

In this text the queen of the Danes gives Brosinga mene (read Brísingamen) to Beowulf as the price for killing Grendel. She acts as a Völva.

=== "The Wife's Lament" ===
Although the term peace-weaver is not specifically mentioned in the old-English poem called The wife’s lament, it has been hypothesized that the narrator is a peace-weaver who is mourning the distance between herself and her husband, and she remains with his family.

== See also ==
- Alliance theory
- Marriage of state
