= Witta, son of Wecta =

Witta son of Wecta is mentioned as a Jutish chieftain in the 449 entry of the Anglo-Saxon Chronicle as the father of Wihtgils and the grandfather of Hengest and Horsa. He also appears in the same role in Henry of Huntingdon's Historia Anglorum. He is most probably mythological, but as a historical person he would have been born around 400 AD.
