= Hildeburh =

Hildeburh, introduced in line 1071 of the poem, Beowulf, is the daughter of the Danish King Hoc and the wife of the Finn, King of the Frisians. Her story is sung by a scop during festivities in lines 1071-1158.

Hildeburh in her marriage to Finn thus acts as a freothuwebbe or peace-weaver (an important concept in the poem). However, the peace was not kept and Hildeburh lost her brother, Hnæf, son and husband in battle. Hildeburh's position as a link between the two kingdoms and her stoicism are central concepts to the story.

== See also ==
- Finnsburg Fragment

== Sources ==
- The Social Centrality of Women in Beowulf: A New Context
- "The Social Centrality of Women in Beowulf: A New Context" by By Dorothy Carr Porter
