= Hnæf =

Hnæf son of Hoc is a prince mentioned in the Old English poems Beowulf and the Finnsburg Fragment. According to the listing of tribes in the poem Widsith (10th century), Hnæf ruled the Hocings. Hoc is called Hoc Healfdene, suggesting a partly Danish ancestry.

According to the narrative, Hnæf was the brother of Hildeburh and brother-in-law of Finn, who ruled the Frisians and was killed during a Danish expedition to Frisian territory.

Hoc may be identical to the chieftain Haki mentioned in the Ynglinga Saga by Snorri Sturlason. This Haki conquered the kingdom of Uppsala and reigned there for ten years before he was cast out by king Jorund.

The father-son pair Hoc and Hnæf has been associated with the historical Alamannic noblemen, possibly of Nibelung extraction, Huoching (d. 744) and Hnabi (d. 788), the founder of the Ahalolfings. This suggestion was first made in 1849 by John Mitchell Kemble in History of the Saxons in England (p. 419). If the Old English legendary characters have been influenced by these historical characters, this would set the late 8th century as a terminus post quem for the date of Beowulf.

== See also ==
- Germanic Heroic Age
