= Hengist and Horsa =

Legendary brothers said to have led the invasion of Britain in the fifth century

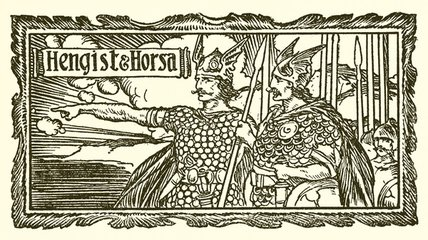
The brothers in Edward Parrott's Pageant of British History (1909)

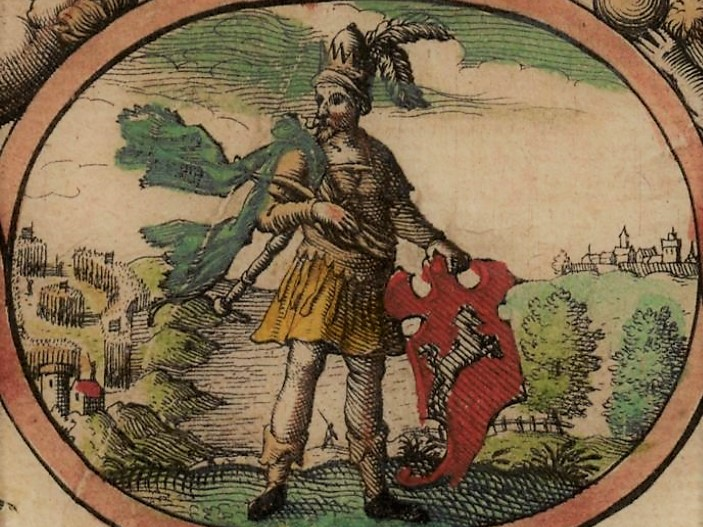
Hengist from John Speed's 1611 "Saxon Heptarchy"

Hengist (/ˈhɛŋɡɪst/, HENG-gist) and Horsa are legendary Germanic brothers, who according to later English legends, led the Angles, Saxons, and Jutes, the progenitor groups of modern English people, in their invasion of Great Britain in the fifth century. Tradition lists Hengist as the first of the Jutish kings, or alternatively as the founder of the Kingdom of Kent.

Modern scholarly consensus regards Hengist and Horsa as mythical figures, given their alliterative animal names, the seemingly constructed nature of their genealogy, and the unknowable quality of Bede's sources. Their later detailed representation in texts such as the Anglo-Saxon Chronicle says more about 9th-century attitudes to the past than about the time in which they are said to have existed.

According to early sources, Hengist and Horsa arrived in Britain at Ebbsfleet on the Isle of Thanet. For a time, they served as mercenaries for Vortigern, King of the Britons, but later they turned against him (British accounts have them betraying him in the Treachery of the Long Knives). Horsa was killed fighting the Britons, but Hengist successfully conquered Kent, becoming the forefather of its kings.

A figure named Hengest, possibly identifiable with the leader of British legend, appears in the Finnesburg Fragment and in Beowulf. J. R. R. Tolkien has theorized that this indicates Hengest/Hengist is the same person and originates as a historical person.

Hengist was historically said to have been buried at Hengistbury Head in Dorset, but that remains unlikely, as 20th-century excavations have established that the tumuli on Hengistbury Head date to the Bronze Age.

== Etymology ==
The Old English names Hengest [ˈhendʒest] and Horsa [ˈhorˠzɑ] mean "stallion" and "horse", respectively.

Hors is derived from the Proto-Indo-European base *kurs, to run, which also gave rise to hurry, carry and current (the latter two are borrowings from French). Hors eventually replaced the Old English eoh, following the common Germanic pattern where the original names of sacred animals are replaced by epithets; for example, the word bear, literally meant 'the brown one'. While the Ecclesiastical History and the Anglo-Saxon Chronicle refer to the brother as Horsa, in the History of the Britons, his name is simply Hors. It has been suggested that Horsa may be a pet form of a compound name with the first element "horse".

== Attestations ==
=== Ecclesiastical History of the English People ===
In his eighth-century Ecclesiastical History, Bede records that the first chieftains among the Angles, Saxons, and Jutes in England were said to have been Hengist and Horsa. He relates that Horsa was killed in battle against the Britons and was thereafter buried in East Kent, where at the time of writing, a monument still stood to him. According to Bede, Hengist and Horsa were the sons of Wictgils, son of Witta, son of Wecta, son of Woden.

=== Anglo-Saxon Chronicle ===
The Anglo-Saxon Chronicle, which exists in nine manuscripts and fragments compiled from the 9th to the 12th centuries, records that in the year 449, Vortigern invited Hengist and Horsa to Britain to assist his forces in fighting the Picts. The brothers landed at Eopwinesfleot (Ebbsfleet), and went on to defeat the Picts wherever they fought them. Hengist and Horsa sent word home to Germany describing "the worthlessness of the Britons, and the richness of the land" and asked for assistance. Their request was granted and support arrived. Afterward, more people arrived in Britain from "the three powers of Germany; the Old Saxons, the Angles, and the Jutes".

The Saxons populated Essex, Sussex, and Wessex; the Jutes Kent, the Isle of Wight, and part of Hampshire; and the Angles East Anglia, Mercia, and Northumbria (leaving their original homeland, Angeln, deserted). The Worcester Chronicle (Chronicle D, compiled in the 11th century), and the Peterborough Chronicle (Chronicle E, compiled in the 12th century), include the detail that these forces were led by the brothers Hengist and Horsa, sons of Wihtgils, son of Witta, son of Wecta, son of Woden, but this information is not included in the A, B, C, or F versions.

In the entry for the year 455 the Chronicle details that Hengist and Horsa fought against Vortigern at Aylesford and that Horsa died there. Hengist took control of the kingdom with his son Esc. In 457, Hengist and Esc fought against British forces in Crayford "and there slew four thousand men". The Britons left the land of Kent and fled to London. In 465, Hengest and Esc fought again at the Battle of Wippedesfleot, probably near Ebbsfleet, and slew 12 British leaders. In 473, in the final entry in the Chronicle mentioning Hengist or Horsa, Hengist and Esc are recorded as having taken "immense booty" and the Britons having "fled from the English like fire".

=== History of the Britons ===
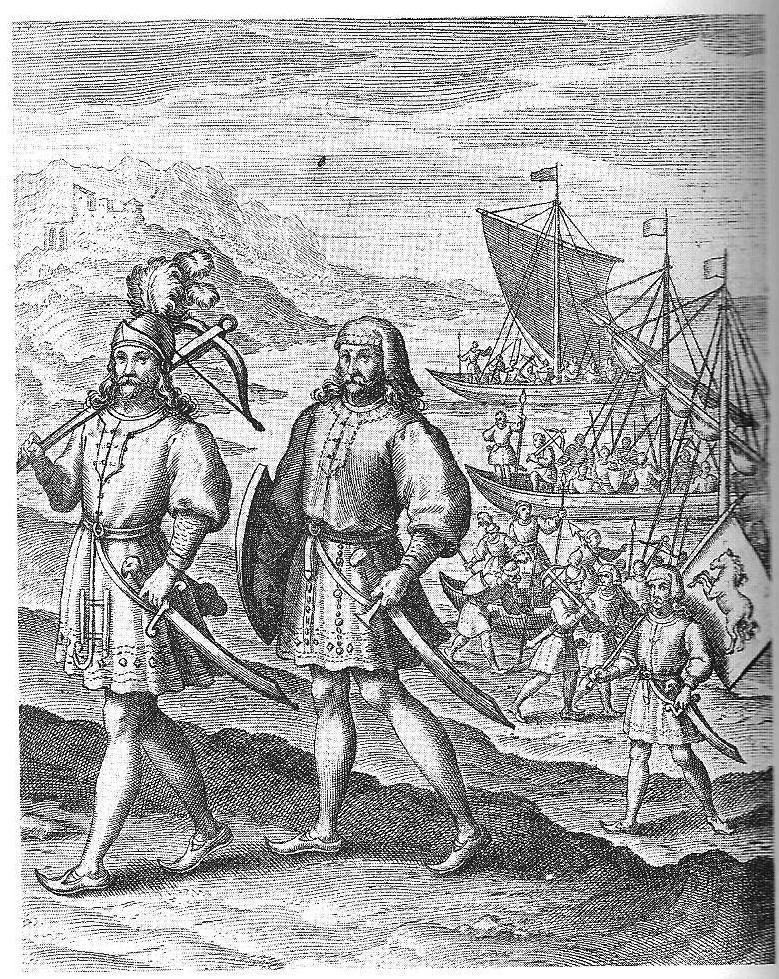
Hengist and Horsa arriving in Britain, as depicted by Richard Rowlands (1605)

The 9th-century History of the Britons, attributed to the Briton Nennius, records that during the reign of Vortigern in Britain, three vessels that had been exiled from Germany arrived in Britain, commanded by Hengist and Horsa. The narrative then gives a genealogy of the two: Hengist and Horsa were sons of Guictglis, son of Guicta, son of Guechta, son of Vouden, son of Frealof, son of Fredulf, son of Finn, son of Foleguald, son of Geta. Geta was said to be the son of a god, yet "not of the omnipotent God and our Lord Jesus Christ", but rather "the offspring of one of their idols, and whom, blinded by some demon, they worshipped according to the custom of the heathen". In 447 AD, Vortigern received Hengist and Horsa "as friends" and gave to the brothers the Isle of Thanet.

After the Saxons had lived on Thanet for "some time", Vortigern promised them supplies of clothing and other provisions on the condition that they assist him in fighting the enemies of his country. As the Saxons increased in number, the Britons became unable to keep their agreement, so told them that their assistance was no longer needed and that they should go home.

Vortigern allowed Hengist to send for more of his countrymen to come over to fight for him. Messengers were sent to "Scythia", where "a number" of warriors were selected, and, with 16 ships, the messengers returned. With the men came Hengist's beautiful daughter. Hengist prepared a feast, inviting Vortigern, his officers, and Ceretic, his translator. Prior to the feast, Hengist enjoined his daughter to serve the guests plenty of wine and ale so that they would become drunk. At the feast, Vortigern became enamored with her and promised Hengist whatever he liked in exchange for her betrothal. Hengist, having "consulted with the Elders who attended him of the Angle race", demanded Kent. Without the knowledge of the then-ruler of Kent, Vortigern agreed.

Hengist's daughter was given to Vortigern, who slept with her and deeply loved her. Hengist told Vortigern that he would now be both his father and adviser and that Vortigern would know no defeat with his counsel, "for the people of my country are strong, warlike, and robust". With Vortigern's approval, Hengist would send for his son and his brother to fight against the Scots and those who dwelt near the wall. Vortigern agreed and Ochta and Ebissa arrived with 40 ships, sailed around the land of the Picts, conquered "many regions", and assaulted the Orkney Islands. Hengist continued to send for more ships from his country, so that some islands where his people had previously dwelt are now free of inhabitants.

Vortigern had meanwhile incurred the wrath of Germanus, Bishop of Auxerre (by taking his own daughter for a wife and having a son by her) and had gone into hiding at the advice of his council, but at length, his son Vortimer engaged Hengist and Horsa and their men in battle, drove them back to Thanet, and there enclosed them and beset them on the western flank. The war waxed and waned; the Saxons repeatedly gained ground and were repeatedly driven back. Vortimer attacked the Saxons four times, first enclosing the Saxons in Thanet, secondly fighting at the river Derwent, the third time at Epsford, where both Horsa and Vortigern's son Catigern died, and lastly "near the stone on the shore of the Gallic sea", where the Saxons were defeated and fled to their ships.

After a "short interval", Vortimer died and the Saxons became established, "assisted by foreign pagans". Hengist convened his forces and sent to Vortigern an offer of peace. Vortigern accepted, and Hengist prepared a feast to bring together the British and Saxon leaders. However, he instructed his men to conceal knives beneath their feet. At the right moment, Hengist shouted nima der sexa (get your knives), and his men massacred the unsuspecting Britons. They spared Vortigern, though, who ransomed himself by giving to the Saxons Essex, Sussex, Middlesex, and other unnamed districts.

Germanus of Auxerre was acclaimed as commander of the British forces. By praying, singing "hallelujah", and crying to God, the Britons drove the Saxons to the sea. Germanus then prayed for three days and nights at Vortigern's castle and fire fell from heaven and engulfed the castle. Vortigern, Hengist's daughter, Vortigern's other wives, and all other inhabitants burned to death. Potential alternate fates for Vortigern are provided. However, the Saxons continued to increase in numbers, and after Hengist died, his son Ochta succeeded him.

=== History of the Kings of Britain ===
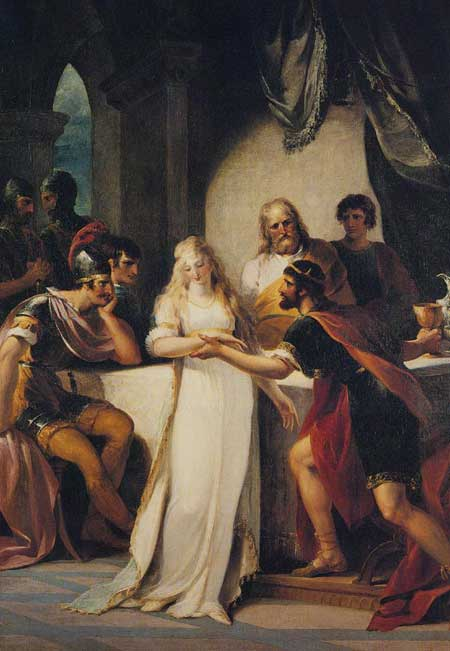
Vortigern and Rowena, by William Hamilton (1793)

In his what is sometimes described as "pseudo-historical" 12th-century work The History of the Kings of Britain, Geoffrey of Monmouth adapted and greatly expanded the account in the History of the Britons. Hengist and Horsa appear in books 6 and 8:

==== Book 6 ====
Geoffrey records that three brigantines or long galleys, arrived in Kent, full of armed men and commanded by two brothers, Hengist and Horsa. Vortigern was then staying at Dorobernia (Canterbury) and ordered that the "tall strangers" be received peacefully and brought to him. When Vortigern saw the company, he immediately observed that the brothers "excelled all the rest both in nobility and in gracefulness of person". He asked what country they had come from and why they had come to his kingdom. Hengist ("whose years and wisdom entitled him to precedence") replied that they had left their homeland of Saxony to offer their services to Vortigern or some other prince, as part of a Saxon custom in which, when the country became overpopulated, able young men were chosen by lot to seek their fortunes in other lands. Hengist and Horsa were made generals over the exiles, as befitted their noble birth.

Vortigern was aggrieved when he learned that the strangers were pagans, but nonetheless rejoiced at their arrival, since he was surrounded by enemies. He asked Hengist and Horsa if they would help him in his wars, offering them land and "other possessions". They accepted the offer, settled on an agreement, and stayed with Vortigern at his court. Soon after, the Picts came from Alba with an immense army and attacked the northern parts of Vortigern's kingdom. In the ensuing battle, "there was little occasion for the Britons to exert themselves, for the Saxons fought so bravely, that the enemy, formerly victorious, were speedily put to flight".

In gratitude, Vortigern increased the rewards he had promised to the brothers. Hengist was given "large possessions of lands in Lindsey for the subsistence of himself and his fellow-soldiers". A "man of experience and subtlety", Hengist told Vortigern that his enemies assailed him from every quarter, and that his subjects wished to depose him and make Aurelius Ambrosius king. He asked the king to allow him to send word to Saxony for more soldiers. Vortigern agreed, adding that Hengist could invite over whom he pleased and, "you shall have no refusal from me in whatever you shall desire".

Hengist bowed low in thanks, and made a further request, that he be made a consul or prince, as befitted his birth. Vortigern responded that it was not in his power to do this, reasoning that Hengist was a foreign pagan and would not be accepted by the British lords. Hengist asked, instead, for leave to build a fortress on a piece of land small enough that it could be encircled by a leather thong. Vortigern granted this and ordered Hengist to invite more Saxons.

After executing Vortigern's orders, Hengist took a bull's hide and made it into a single thong, which he used to encircle a carefully chosen rocky place (perhaps at Caistor in Lindsey). Here, he built the castle of Kaercorrei, or in Saxon Thancastre: "thong castle."

The messengers returned from Germany with 18 ships full of the best soldiers they could get, as well as Hengist's beautiful daughter Rowena. Hengist invited Vortigern to see his new castle and the newly arrived soldiers. A banquet took place in Thancastre, at which Vortigern drunkenly asked Hengist to let him marry Rowena. Horsa and the men all agreed that Hengist should allow the marriage, on the condition that Vortigern give him Kent.

Vortigern and Rowena were immediately married and Hengist received Kent. The king, though delighted with his new wife, incurred the hatred of his nobles and of his three sons.

As his new father-in-law, Hengist made further demands of Vortigern:

As I am your father, I claim the right of being your counsellor: do not therefore slight my advice, since it is to my countrymen you must owe the conquest of all your enemies. Let us invite over my son Octa, and his brother Ebissa, who are brave soldiers, and give them the countries that are in the northern parts of Britain, by the wall, between Deira and Alba. For they will hinder the inroads of the barbarians, and so you shall enjoy peace on the other side of the Humber.

Vortigern agreed. Upon receiving the invitation, Octa, Ebissa, and another lord, Cherdich, immediately left for Britain with 300 ships. Vortigern received them kindly and gave them ample gifts. With their assistance, Vortigern defeated his enemies in every engagement. All the while, Hengist continued inviting over yet more ships, adding to his numbers daily. Witnessing this, the Britons tried to get Vortigern to banish the Saxons, but on account of his wife, he would not. Consequently, his subjects turned against him and took his son Vortimer for their king. The Saxons and the Britons, led by Vortimer, met in four battles. In the second, Horsa and Vortimer's brother, Catigern, slew one another. By the fourth battle, the Saxons had fled to Thanet, where Vortimer besieged them. When the Saxons could no longer bear the British onslaughts, they sent out Vortigern to ask his son to allow them safe passage back to Germany. While discussions were taking place, the Saxons boarded their ships and left, leaving their wives and children behind.

Rowena poisoned the victorious Vortimer, and Vortigern returned to the throne. At his wife's request, he invited Hengist back to Britain, but instructed him to bring only a small retinue. Hengist, knowing Vortimer to be dead, instead raised an army of 300,000 men. When Vortigern received word of the imminent arrival of the vast Saxon fleet, he resolved to fight them. Rowena alerted her father of this, who after considering various strategies, resolved to make a show of peace and sent ambassadors to Vortigern.

The ambassadors informed Vortigern that Hengist had only brought so many men because he did not know of Vortimer's death and feared further attacks from him. Now that no threat remained, Vortigern could choose from among the men the ones he wished to return to Germany. Vortigern was greatly pleased by these tidings, and arranged to meet Hengist on the first of May at the monastery of Ambrius.

Before the meeting, Hengist ordered his soldiers to carry long daggers beneath their clothing. At the signal Nemet oure Saxas (get your knives), the Saxons fell upon the unsuspecting Britons and massacred them, while Hengist held Vortigern by his cloak. In all, 460 British barons and consuls were killed, as well as some Saxons whom the Britons beat to death with clubs and stones. Vortigern was held captive and threatened with death until he resigned control of Britain's chief cities to Hengist. Once free, he fled to Cambria.

==== Book 8 ====
In Cambria, Merlin prophesied to Vortigern that the brothers Aurelius Ambrosius and Uther Pendragon (who had fled to Armorica as children after Vortigern killed their brother Constans and their father, King Constantine) would return to have their revenge and defeat the Saxons. They arrived the next day, and after rallying the dispersed Britons, Aurelius was proclaimed king. Aurelius marched into Cambria and burned Vortigern alive in his tower, before setting his sights upon the Saxons.

Hengist was struck by terror at the news of Vortigern's death and fled with his army beyond the Humber. He took courage at the approach of Aurelius and selected the bravest among his men to defend him. Hengist told these chosen men not to be afraid of Aurelius, for he had brought less than 10,000 Armorican Britons (the native Britons were hardly worth taking into account), while there were 200,000 Saxons. Hengist and his men advanced towards Aurelius in a field called Maisbeli (probably Ballifield, near Sheffield), intending to take the Britons by surprise, but Aurelius anticipated them.

As they marched to meet the Saxons, Eldol, Duke of Gloucester, told Aurelius that he greatly wished to meet Hengist in combat, noting that "one of the two of us should die before we parted". He explained that he had been at the Treachery of the Long Knives, but had escaped when God threw him a stake to defend himself with, making him the only Briton present to survive. Meanwhile, Hengist was placing his troops into formation, giving directions, and walking through the lines of troops, "the more to spirit them up".

With the armies in formation, battle began between the Britons and Saxons, both sides suffering "no small loss of blood". Eldol focused on attempting to find Hengist, but had no opportunity to fight him. "By the especial favour of God", the Britons took the upper hand, and the Saxons withdrew and made for Kaerconan (Conisbrough). Aurelius pursued them, killing or enslaving any Saxon he met on the way. Realizing Kaerconan would not hold against Aurelius, Hengist stopped outside the town and ordered his men to make a stand, "for he knew that his whole security now lay in his sword".

Aurelius reached Hengist, and a "most furious" fight ensued, with the Saxons maintaining their ground despite heavy losses. They came close to winning before a detachment of horses from the Armorican Britons arrived. When Gorlois, Duke of Cornwall, arrived, Eldol knew the day was won and grabbed Hengist's helmet, dragging him into the British ranks. The Saxons fled. Hengist's son Octa retreated to York and his kinsman Eosa to Alclud (Dumbarton).

Three days after the battle, Aurelius called together a council of principal officers to decide what to do with Hengist. Eldol's brother Eldad, Bishop of Gloucester, said:

Though all should be unanimous for setting him at liberty, yet would I cut him to pieces. The prophet Samuel is my warrant, who, when he had Agag, king of Amalek, in his power, hewed him in pieces, saying, As thy sword hath made women childless, so shall thy mother be childless among women. Do therefore the same to Hengist, who is a second Agag.

Consequently, Eldol drew Hengist out of the city and cut off his head. Aurelius, "who showed moderation in all his conduct", arranged for him to be buried and for a mound to be raised over his corpse, according to the custom of pagans. Octa and Eosa surrendered to Aurelius, who granted them the country bordering Scotland and made a firm covenant with them.

=== Prose Edda ===
The Icelander Snorri Sturluson, writing in the 13th century, briefly mentions Hengist in the Prologue, the first book of the Prose Edda. The Prologue gives a euhemerized account of Germanic history, including the detail that Woden put three of his sons in charge of Saxony. The ruler of eastern Saxony was Veggdegg, one of whose sons was Vitrgils, the father of Vitta, the father of Hengist.

== Horse-head gables ==
On farmhouses in Lower Saxony and Schleswig-Holstein, horse-head gables were referred to as "Hengst und Hors" (Low German for "stallion and mare") as late as around 1875. Rudolf Simek notes that these horse-head gables can still be seen today, and says that the horse-head gables confirm that Hengist and Horsa were originally considered mythological, horse-shaped beings. Martin Litchfield West comments that the horse heads may have been remnants of pagan religious practices in the area.

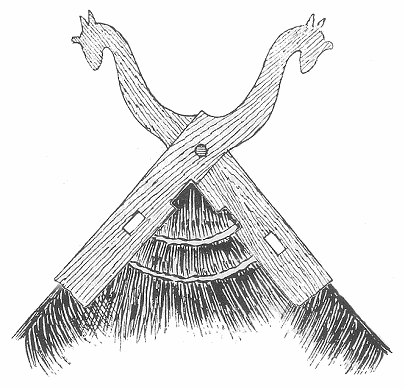
Sketch of a farmhouse gable

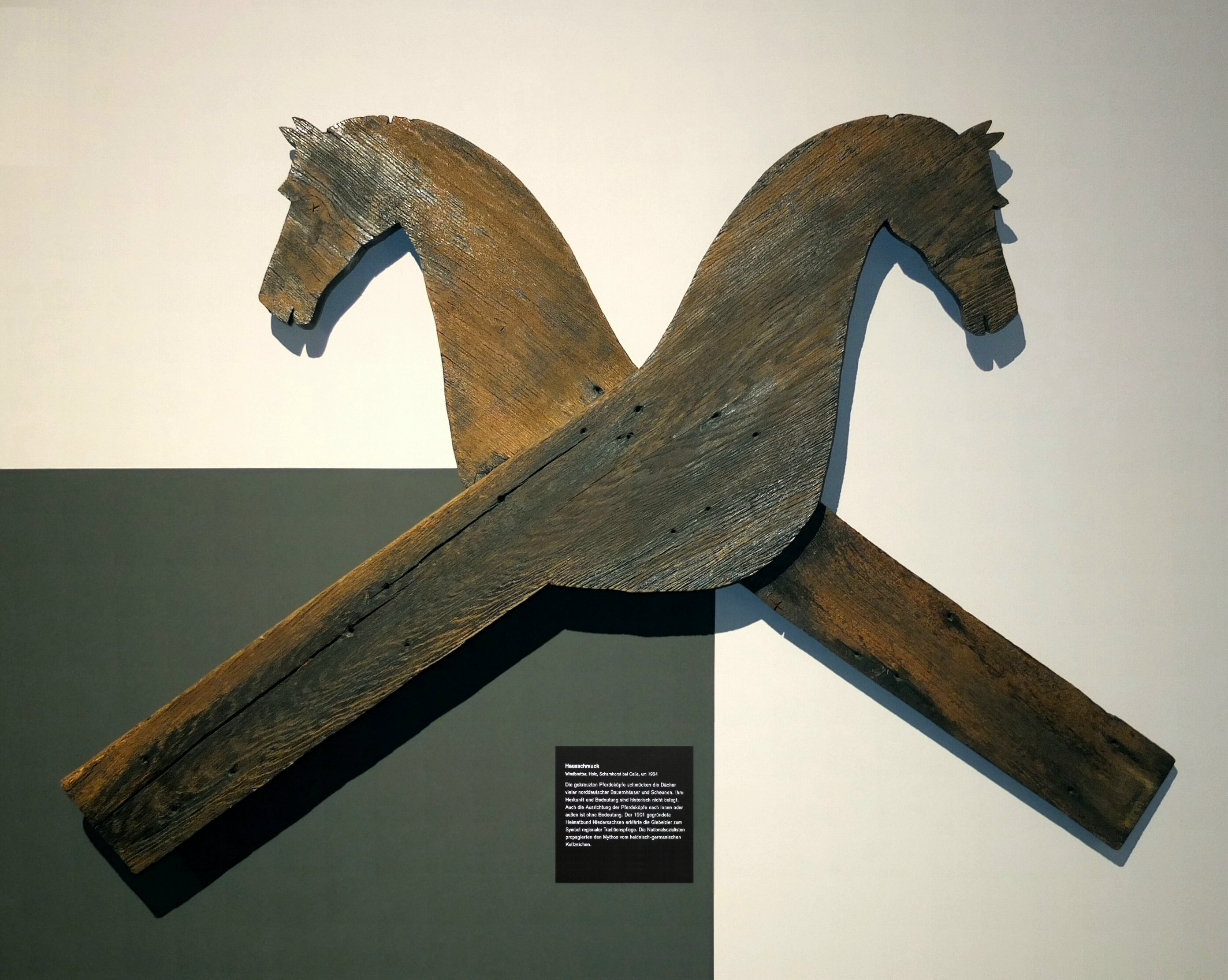
Gable with crossed horse heads, Hanover

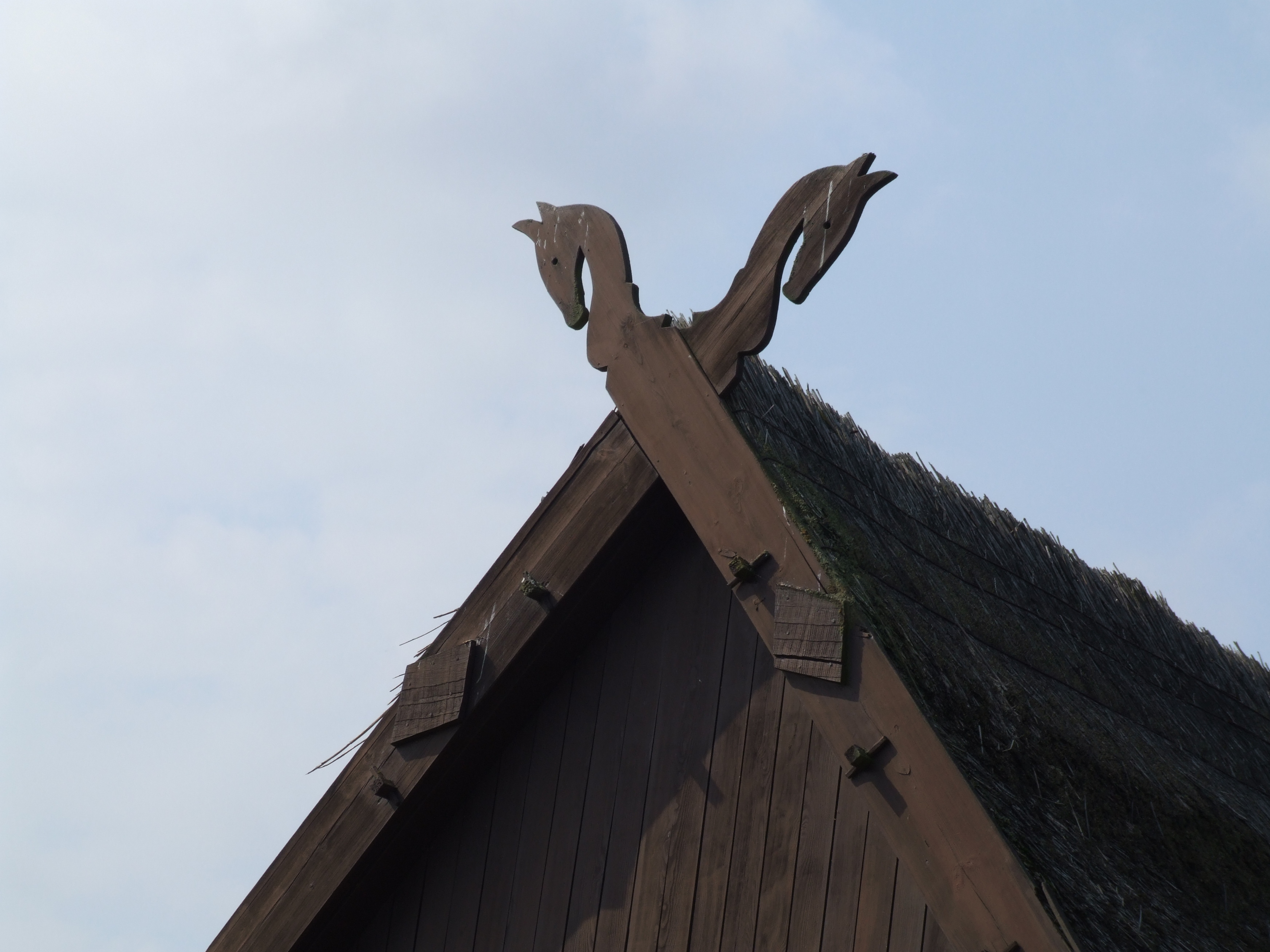
A gable in Mecklenburg-Vorpommern

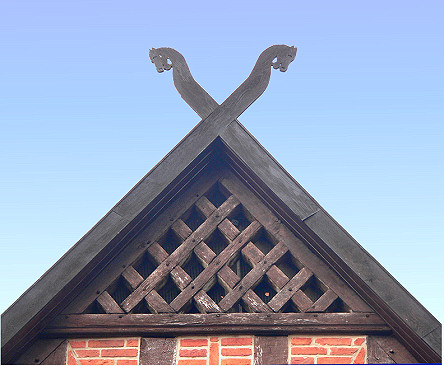
A gable in Hanover

Coat of arms of Buchholz in der Nordheide

Coat of arms of Thune, Brunswick

Coat of arms of Spornitz, Mecklenburg-Vorpommern

An 1877 version of the logo of the Raiffeisen farmers' co-operative movement

== Theories ==
=== Finnesburg Fragment and Beowulf ===
A Hengest appears in line 34 of the Finnesburg Fragment, which describes the legendary Battle of Finnsburg. In Beowulf, a scop recites a composition summarizing the Finnsburg events, including information not provided in the fragment. Hengest is mentioned in lines 1082 and 1091.

Some scholars have proposed that the figure mentioned in both of these references is one and the same as the Hengist of the Hengist and Horsa accounts, though Horsa is not mentioned in either source. In his work Finn and Hengest, J. R. R. Tolkien argued that Hengist was a historical figure, and that Hengist came to Britain after the events recorded in the Finnesburg Fragment and Beowulf. Patrick Sims-Williams is more sceptical of the account, suggesting that Bede's Canterbury source, on which he relied for his account of Hengist and Horsa in the Ecclesiastical History, had confused two separate traditions.

=== Germanic twin brothers and divine Indo-European horse twins ===
Several sources attest that the Germanic peoples venerated a divine twin brothers. The earliest reference to this practice derives from Timaeus (c. 345 – c. 250 BC). Timaeus records that the Celts of the North Sea were especially devoted to what he describes as Castor and Pollux. In his work Germania, Tacitus records the veneration of the Alcis, whom he identifies with Castor and Pollux. Germanic legends mention various brothers as founding figures. The first or second century, historian Cassius Dio cites the brothers Raos and Raptos as the leaders of the Astings. According to Paul the Deacon's eighhth-century History of the Lombards, the Lombards migrated southward from Scandinavia led by Ibur and Aio, while Saxo Grammaticus records in his 12th-century Deeds of the Danes that this migration was prompted by Aggi and Ebbi. In related Indo-European cultures, similar traditions are attested, such as the Dioscuri. Scholars have theorized that these divine twins in Indo-European cultures stem from divine twins in prehistoric Proto-Indo-European culture.

J. P. Mallory comments on the great importance of the horse in Indo-European religion, as exemplified "most obviously" by various mythical brothers appearing in Indo-European legend, including Hengist and Horsa:

Some would maintain that the premier animal of the Indo-European sacrifice and ritual was probably the horse. We have already seen how its embedment in Proto-Indo-European society lies not just in its lexical reconstruction but also in the proliferation of personal names which contain "horse" as an element among the various Indo-European peoples. Furthermore, we witness the importance of the horse in Indo-European rituals and mythology. One of the most obvious examples is the recurrent depiction of twins such as the Indic Asvins "horsemen," the Greek horsemen Castor and Pollux, the legendary Anglo-Saxon settlers Horsa and Hengist [...] or the Irish twins of Macha, born after she had completed a horse race. All of these attest the existence of Indo-European divine twins associated with or represented by horses.

=== Uffington White Horse ===
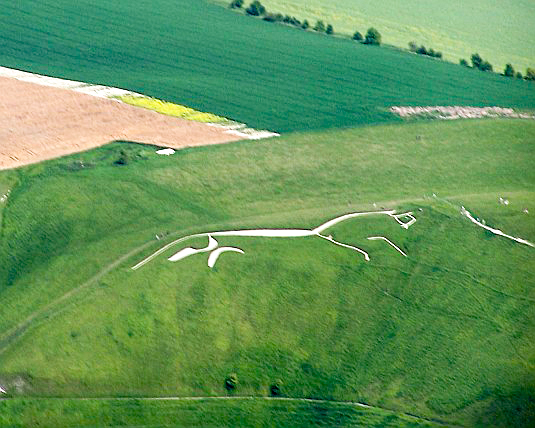
The Uffington White Horse

In his 17th-century work Monumenta Britannica, John Aubrey ascribes the Uffington White Horse hill figure to Hengist and Horsa, stating, "the White Horse was their Standard at the Conquest of Britain." However, he also ascribes the origins of the horse to the Ancient Britons, reasoning that the horse resembles Celtic Iron Age coins. As a result, advocates of a Saxon origin of the figure debated with those favouring an ancient British origin for three centuries after Aubrey's findings.

In 1995, using optically stimulated luminescence dating, David Miles and Simon Palmer of the Oxford Archaeology Unit assigned the Uffington White Horse to the Bronze Age.

=== Aschanes ===
The Brothers Grimm identified Hengist with Aschanes, mythical first King of the Saxons, in their notes for legend number 413 of their German Legends. Editor and translator Donald Ward, in his commentary on the tale, regards the identification as untenable on linguistic grounds.

== Modern influence ==
Coat of arms of Bünde, Germany, depicting Hengist and Horsa

Hengist and Horsa have appeared in a variety of media in the modern period. Written between 1616 and 1620, Thomas Middleton's play Hengist, King of Kent features portrayals of both Hengist and Horsa (as Hersus). On 6 July 1776, the first committee for the production of the Great Seal of the United States convened. One of three members of the committee, Thomas Jefferson, proposed that one side of the seal feature Hengist and Horsa, "the Saxon chiefs from whom we claim the honor of being descended, and whose political principles and form of government we assumed".

"Hengist and Horsus" appear as antagonists in the play Vortigern and Rowena, which was touted as a newly discovered work by William Shakespeare in 1796, but was soon revealed as a hoax by William Henry Ireland. The pair have plaques in the Walhalla Temple at Regensburg, Bavaria, which honours distinguished figures of German history.

During World War II, two British military gliders took their names from the brothers, the Slingsby Hengist and the Airspeed Horsa. The 20th-century American poet Robinson Jeffers composed a poem titled "Ode to Hengist and Horsa". Likewise, Jorge Luis Borges's poem "Hengist Quiere Hombres" (449 AD) was published in translation in The New Yorker in 1977.

In 1949, Prince Georg of Denmark came to Pegwell Bay in Kent to dedicate the longship Hugin, commemorating the landing of Hengest and Horsa at nearby Ebbsfleet 1500 years earlier in 449 AD.

Though Hengist and Horsa are not referenced in the medieval tales of King Arthur, some modern Arthurian tales do link them. For example, in Mary Stewart's Merlin Trilogy, Hengist and Horsa are executed by Ambrosius; Hengist is given full Saxon funeral honours, cremated with his weapons on a pyre. In Alfred Duggan's Conscience of the King, Hengist plays a major role in the early career of Cerdic Elesing, legendary founder of the kingdom of Wessex.

Part of the A299 road on the Isle of Thanet is named Hengist Way.

== See also ==
- Alcis (gods), Germanic horse brother deities venerated by the Naharvali, a Germanic people described by Tacitus in 1 AD
- Ašvieniai, Lithuanian brother horse deities, also used crossed, on top of cottage house roofs
- Ashvins, Vedic twin deities of medicine
- Divine twins, a number of Indo-European mythical brother deities, associated with horses
- Horses in Germanic paganism, wider importance of horses in early Germanic cultures
- Saxon Steed, a heraldic motif
- Thracian horseman, sometimes linked to the Dioscuri

== Notes ==
Regnal titles
Preceded by Vortigern	King of Kent; 455/456–488	Succeeded by Oisc
