= Biennus =

Coordinates: 35°14′51″N 23°34′46″E

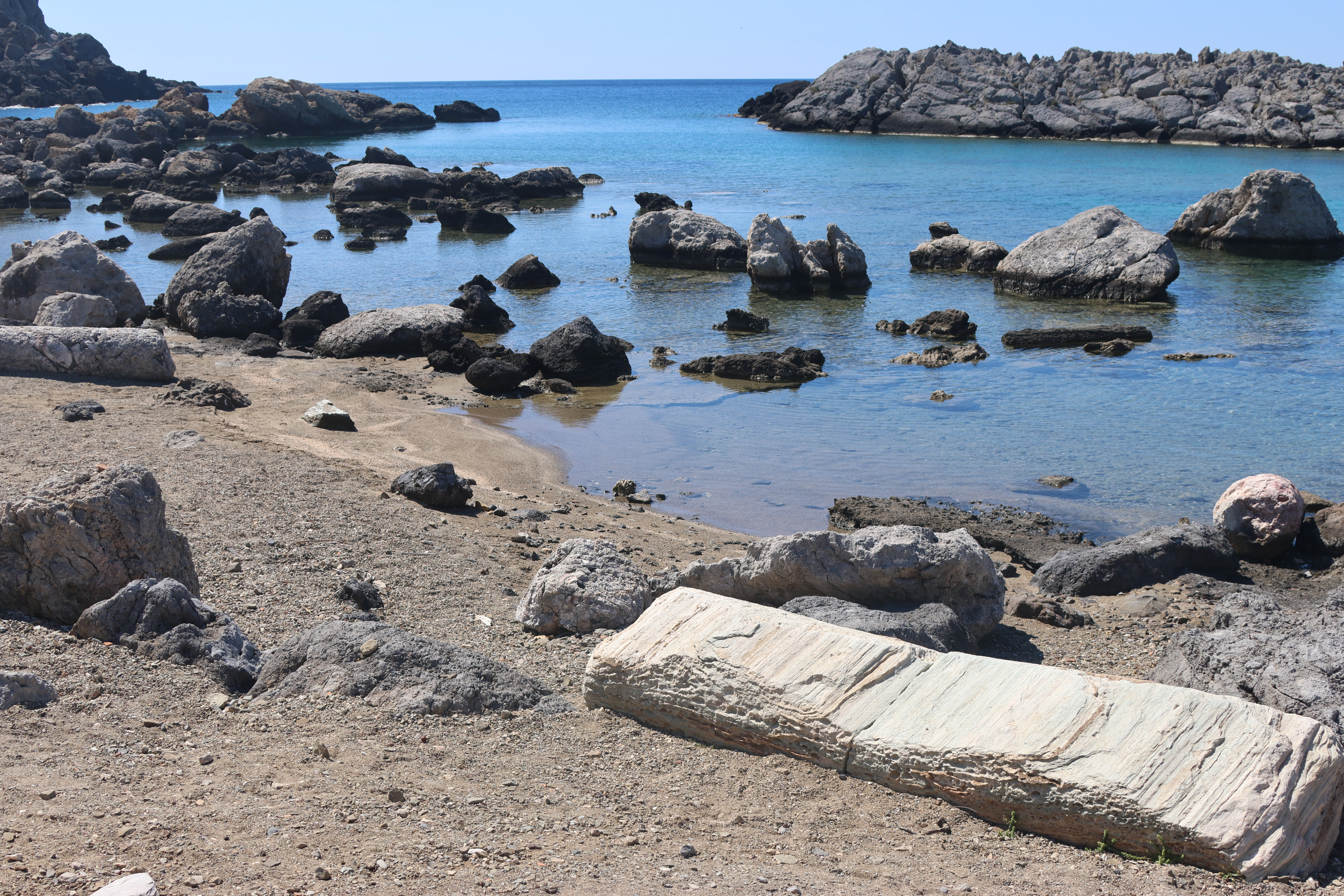
Biennus (Viennos)

Biennus or Biennos (Ancient Greek: Βίεννος) was a coastal town of ancient Crete. According to the Stadiasmus Maris Magni, it had a harbour and was located on the south coast of Crete, 12 stadia from Kriou Metopon (the southwest extremity of Crete) and 270 stadia from Phalasarna.

The site of Biennus is tentatively located near modern Agios Ioannis, Ktista, near the southwestern extremity of Crete.
