= Sheila Ager =

Canadian historian of the ancient Greek world (born 1956)

- Born: 1956 (age 69–70)

Academic background
- Education: Queen's University; University of British Columbia

Academic work
- Discipline: Classics; Hellenistic History
- Institutions: University of Waterloo
- Notable works: Interstate Arbitrations in the Greek World, 337-90 B.C

Sheila Louise Ager (born 1956) is a Canadian lecturer and the director of Hellenistic studies at the University of Waterloo, Ontario. Her principal area of interest is Greek history, focusing on the Hellenistic Age, from 323 BC to 30 BC. She has further interest in interstate relations in the Hellenistic Period, and much of her work centres on the concept of peaceful resolution of disputes. She also researches the Ptolemaic dynasty, especially its final ruler, Cleopatra VII.

== Career ==
Ager received her BA and MA from Queen's University, Kingston, Ontario, and was awarded her Ph.D from the University of British Columbia in 1989. Since 1987 she has worked at the University of Waterloo, where she has held positions including chair of the Department of Classical Studies, associate dean of arts (undergraduate studies), and director of the Waterloo Institute for Hellenistic Studies. Since 2019, she has been dean of the Faculty of Arts. She was the Hyde lecturer at the University of Pennsylvania in 2020.

== Selected publications ==
=== Books ===
- ed., Cultural History of Peace in Antiquity (500 BC – AD 800). (2020). Part of series, A Cultural History of Peace, ed. Ronald Edsforth. Bloomsbury.
- Belonging and Isolation in the Hellenistic World (2013, ed., with R. Faber). University of Toronto Press.
- Interstate Arbitrations in the Greek World, 337-90 B.C (1996). University of California Press, Berkeley and Los Angeles.

=== Book chapters and journal articles ===
- 2016 (with C. Hardiman) “Female Seleukid Portraits: Where Are They?” In Seleukid Royal Women: Creation, Representation, and Distortion of Hellenistic Queenship in the Seleukid Empire, eds. A. Coşkun and A. McAuley: 143-72. Stuttgart: Franz Steiner Verlag.
- 2013 “Marriage or Mirage? The Phantom Wedding of Cleopatra and Antony.” Classical Philology 108.2: 139-55.
- 2012 “The Alleged Rapprochement between Achaios and Attalos I in 220 BC.” Historia: Zeitschrift für alte Geschichte 61.4: 421-29.
- 2009 “Roman Perspectives on Greek Diplomacy.” In C. Eilers (ed.), Diplomats and Diplomacy in the Roman World. Mnemosyne Supplement 304; Brill, Leiden/Boston: 15-43.
- 2008 “Rescuing Local History: Epigraphy and the Island of Thera.” In C. Cooper (ed.), Epigraphy and the Greek Historian (Festschrift for P. Harding), University of Toronto Press: 150-76.
- 2007 “Keeping the Peace in Ionia: Kings and Poleis.” In H. Elton/G. Reger (eds.) Regionalism in Hellenistic and Roman Asia Minor, Ausonius Editions, Paris and Bordeaux: 45-52.
- 2005 “Familiarity Breeds: Incest and the Ptolemaic Dynasty.” Journal of Hellenic Studies 125: 1-34.
- 2005 “Sacred Settlements: the Role of the Gods in the Resolution of Interstate Disputes.” In J.-M. Bertrand (ed.), La violence dans les mondes grec et romain, Actes du colloque international (Paris, 2-4 mai 2002), Publications de la Sorbonne, Paris: 413-29.
- 2001 “Fourth-century Thera and the Second Athenian Sea League.” The Ancient World 32: 99-119.
- 1998 “Civic Identity in the Hellenistic World: the Case of Lebedos.” Greek, Roman, and Byzantine Studies 39 (1998 [2000]): 5-21.
- 1998 “Thera and the Pirates: an Ancient Case of the Stockholm Syndrome?” Ancient History Bulletin 12: 83-95.
- 1997 “Foreign Judges and Dikaiodosia: a Rhodian Fragment.” Zeitschrift für Papyrologie und Epigraphik 117: 123-25.
- 1994 “Hellenistic Crete and Koinodikion,” Journal of Hellenic Studies 114: 1-18.
- 1993 “Why War? Some Views on International Arbitration in Ancient Greece.” Echos du monde classique/Classical Views 12: 1-13.
- 1991 “A Royal Arbitration between Klazomenai and Teos?” Zeitschrift für Papyrologie und Epigraphik 85: 87-97.
- 1991 “Rhodes: the Rise and Fall of a Neutral Diplomat.” Historia: Zeitschrift für alte Geschichte 40: 10-41.
- 1989 “Judicial Imperialism: the Case of Melitaia.” Ancient History Bulletin 3: 107-14.
