= Marriage of state =

Marriage arranged for diplomatic purposes

A marriage of state is a diplomatic marriage or union between two members of different nation-states or internally, between two power blocs, usually in authoritarian societies and is a practice which dates back to ancient times, as far back as early Grecian cultures in western society, and of similar antiquity in other civilizations. The fable of Helen of Troy may be the best known classical tale reporting an incidence of surrendering a female member of a ruling line to gain peace or shore up alliances of state between nation-states headed by small oligarchies or acknowledged royalty.

== Europe ==
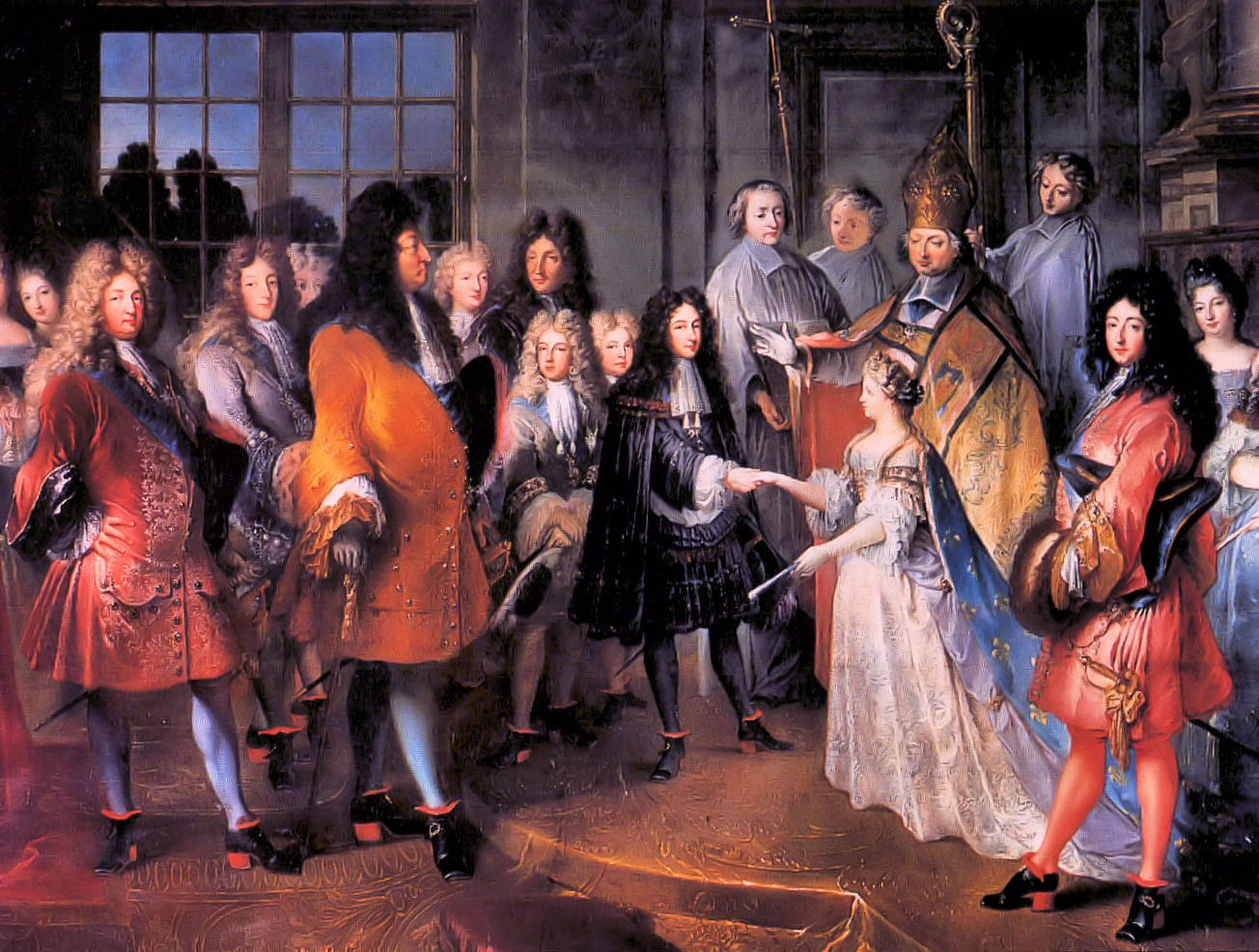
The marriage of the Duke of Burgundy to Marie Adélaïde of Savoy on December 7, 1697 by Antoine Dieu

While the contemporary Western ideal sees marriage as a unique bond between two people who are in love, families in which heredity is central to power or inheritance (such as royal families) often see marriage in a different light. There are often political or other non-romantic functions that must be served, and the relative wealth and power of the potential spouses are considered. Marriage for political, economic, or diplomatic reasons was the pattern for centuries among European rulers.

Careful selection of a spouse was important to maintain the royal status of a family: depending on the law of the land in question, if a prince or king was to marry a commoner who had no royal blood, even if the first-born was acknowledged as a son of a sovereign, he might not be able to claim any of the royal status of his father.

Traditionally, many factors were important in the arranging of royal marriages. One such factor was the size of the tracts of land that the other royal family governed or controlled. Another, related factor was the stability of the control exerted over that territory: when there is territorial instability in a royal family, other royals will be less inclined to marry into that family. Another factor was political alliance: marriage was an important way to bind together royal families and "their countries during peace and war" and could justify many important political decisions.

== Importance of religion ==
Religion has always been closely tied to political affairs and continues to be today in many countries. Religious considerations were often important in marriages among royal families, particularly in lands where there was an established or official religion. When a royal family was prepared to negotiate or arrange the marriage of one of its children, it was extremely important to have a prospective spouse who followed the same religion or, at the very least, that the spouse be willing to convert before the wedding. In non-Catholic royal families, there were few things worse than marrying a person who was a Catholic. Some countries barred from accession to the throne any person who married a Catholic, as in the British Act of Settlement 1701. When a Protestant prince converted to Catholicism, he risked being disowned by his family, and often being barred from the throne himself. Some of these laws are still in force, centuries after the conclusion of Europe's Wars of Religion.

Roman Catholic countries had similar laws and strictures. France, for example, effectively barred non-Catholics from the throne. Even if the law did not strictly prohibit marrying non-Catholic royalty, political situations and popular sentiment were frequently sufficient to dissuade princes from so doing.

== Rulers' marriages ==
=== Elizabeth I ===
Contrary to what some historians have said about her elusiveness when in marriage negotiations with suitors or their representatives, Queen Elizabeth I was known to be straightforward in her various courtships. In 1565, when in the midst of the Habsburg matrimonial project, Elizabeth promptly dismissed the rival French suit of their fourteen-year-old king, stating she would have to be ten years younger to consider it. Furthermore, in addition to concerns about religion, financial arrangements, and security, Elizabeth also maintained that she could not marry anyone whom she had not seen in person, perhaps as a result of her father's own displeasure and divorce of Anne of Cleves. The emphasis on religion, national security, and securing the line of succession in all of Elizabeth's marriage negotiations demonstrate the emphasis placed on the political importance of marriages of state during this period. Although some of her contemporaries hoped she would find solace in marriage, procreation was still considered the primary purpose of royal marriage.

In March 1565, Elizabeth told her Spanish ambassador, Diego Guzmán de Silva:

If I could appoint such a successor to the Crown as would please me and the country, I would not marry, as it is a thing for which I have never had any inclination. My subjects, however press me so that I cannot help myself or take the other course, which is a very difficult one. There is a strong idea in the world that a woman cannot live unless she is married, or at all events that is she refrains from marriage she does so for some bad reason....But what can we do?

Thus, Elizabeth appeared to personally believe that a woman should reasonably be able to remain single. However, she continued to engage in marriage negotiations for decades because of the expectations of her role as monarch. Although she herself had little inclination to marry, she understood the limitations of her power and therefore seriously considered marriage on numerous occasion at the behest of councillors.

The Habsburg marriage negotiations revolving around the marriage of Queen Elizabeth I to Archduke Charles show the way marriage was often negotiated in royal families. The first phase began in 1559, with the initiative for a matrimonial alliance between England and Austria. However, the first phase was a failure, and the people of England were relieved of their fear of a foreign ruler coming into their country. Negotiations were re-opened with some difficulty in 1563 by the English. This was in part due to Charles' search for a wife elsewhere, the lack of permanent diplomatic links between Austria and England, and because of Emperor Ferdinand's distrust of Elizabeth for her refusal of his son's suit in 1559. However, Sir William Cecil was interested in the match and began work on a marriage negotiation. While the first set of negotiations were uncertain, the second round of negotiations gathered stronger support in England for the suit and went on for several years.

Both sides hoped to gain from a marital alliance. In England, the negotiations were a key element to Elizabeth's foreign policy and intended to protect the country's commercial interests and political security against the French-Scottish alliance. Austria also hoped to gain in similar ways from a political alliance and possibly bring Catholicism back to England. However, English support was partly due to the fact that the English had been deliberately misled to believe that Charles would be willing to convert to Protestantism and in the end, the archduke's Catholicism and refusal to come to England before finalizing a betrothal proved too difficult to overcome and the suit dissolved. These negotiations, nevertheless, illustrate how support and opposition ebbed and flowed over the course of time, and how issues like religion, which seemed to be resolvable at the outset, could ultimately doom an otherwise promising proposal.

=== Napoleon ===
Napoleon, as emperor, gave out kingdoms and female relatives with equal largesse to favored Marshals and general officers.

=== United Kingdom ===
Through most of recorded history state marriages were also common at lesser levels of rulers, and many a lesser marriage of state was consummated and bargained over during all of the Middle Ages and through the middle of the twentieth-century in western society, and the old forms still hold sway in many other cultural contexts today. One famous example of a marriage of state for lesser reasons was that of George II of Great Britain's parents. The Princess Sophia's dowry included properties assuring an income of 100,000 thalers annually, which led to George Louis, Duke of Brunswick-Lüneburg (the future George I of Great Britain), marrying his first cousin Sophia Dorothea of Celle—when both were pressed into the arrangement by his mother— and that German ducal dynastic move accidentally gave the couple the inside track on the Protestant thrones of England, Scotland and Ireland (and later, those of the United Kingdom and Ireland).

=== Modern Interpretation ===
The concept of “marriage of state” has also inspired modern educational and recreational projects. One example is Tudors: Marriage of State, a card game created by Echo Earth Games, which draws on the political and familial alliances of Henry VIII’s court. The game features European royal princesses, English noblewomen, and members of the lower gentry, allowing players to explore rivalries, alliances, and the pursuit of influence in a historically informed, strategic gameplay setting. Artwork and portraits in the game are inspired by Hans Holbein the Younger and other contemporary artists, combining historical accuracy with engaging design.

== See also ==
- Arranged marriage
- Heqin – a similar practice in Imperial China
- Royal intermarriage
- Peace-weaver
