= Alan Bliss =

British philologist (1921–1985)

Alan Bliss (1921–1985) was a noted British philologist. Much of his early work was concerned with Old and Middle English, the history of the English language, and medieval French philology (especially Anglo-Norman) and his later work with Hiberno-English. He was born in London, and attended Finchley Catholic Grammar School, then King's College London, and then Balliol College, Oxford. His academic career began at Oxford but he soon, 1953, gained an appointment as Chair of English at the Royal University of Malta. This was followed by a professorship at the University of Istanbul. In 1961, he took up an appointment in the Department of Old and Middle English at University College Dublin where he was to remain until the end of his career.

== Selected publications ==
- Bliss, A. J. (1984). English in the south of Ireland. Language in the British isles, 135, 51.
- Bliss, A. J. (1972). Languages in contact: some problems of Hiberno-English. Proceedings of the Royal Irish Academy. Section C: Archaeology, Celtic Studies, History, Linguistics, Literature, 72, 63–82.
- Bliss, A. J. (1958). The metre of Beowulf. Oxford, Blackwell.
- Bliss, Alan. (1996). A Dictionary of Foreign Words and Phrases in Current English. Routledge, London. ISBN 0-415-05905-4

=== Editorial Works ===
- Bliss, A. J., ed. (1954; 2nd ed., 1966). Sir Orfeo. Oxford, Clarendon.
- Bliss, Alan, ed. (1982). J. R. R. Tolkien. Finn and Hengest: The Fragment and the Episode. London, George Allen & Unwin.
