= Isopoliteia =

Treaty of equal citizenship rights between ancient Greek city-states

An isopoliteia (Ancient Greek: ἰσοπολιτεία) was a treaty of equal citizenship rights between the poleis (city-states) of ancient Greece. This happened through either mutual agreement between cities or through exchange of individual decrees. It was used to cement amicable diplomatic relations. The Aetolian League was a unique case of a larger political entity which granted isopoliteia treaties. Sympoliteia goes further, merging the governments of two or more poleis.

== History ==
There are many examples of this, such as a pact between Miletus and Cyzicus from approximately 330 BC which recorded their eternal friendship. On other occasions the treaties had a limited duration and had to be renewed, such as a treaty between Miletus and Phygela from the end of the fourth century BC, which renewed the isopoliteia between them. A colony could also be granted an isopoliteia from its mother city, like Kios obtained it from Miletus in ca. 228 BC.

With an isopoliteia citizens could enjoy the privileges of their citizenship in both cities who took part in the treaty. In practice this meant they were entitled to benefits such as exemption from taxation, the right to sacrifice in the public cults, special seats at public gatherings, and the right to argue lawsuits in the public court that was reserved for citizens. Also, any citizen of the one city who wanted to obtain full citizenship — especially eligibility for public office — in the other city need only declare himself liable to taxation.

In the case of mother cities and colonies the relationship was unusual, because mother cities would normally strictly limit the right of return of their former citizens who settled in their colonies. Vanessa Gorman argues that Miletus used isopoliteia treaties to attract settlers from its colonies when the city was rebuilt after the Battle of Mycale in 479 BC. The resettlement of Teos around the second half of the sixth century by settlers from its colony Abdera might have been a similar case.

== See also ==
- Cleruchy
