= Germanic Heroic Age =

Germanic heroic legends

The Germanic (or "German") Heroic Age, so called in analogy to the Heroic Age of Greek mythology, is the period of early historic or quasi-historic events reflected in Germanic heroic poetry, often expressed in alliterative verse.

== Periodisation ==
The period corresponds to the Germanic Wars in terms of historiography, and to the Germanic Iron Age in terms of archaeology, spanning the early centuries of the 1st millennium, in particular the 4th and 5th centuries, the period of the final collapse of the Western Roman Empire and the establishment of stable "barbarian kingdoms" larger than at the tribal level (the kingdoms of the Visigoths and Ostrogoths, the Franks and the Burgundians, and the Anglo-Saxon settlement of Britain). The Germanic peoples at the time lived mostly in tribal societies.

William Paton Ker in Epic and Romance (1897) takes the "heroic age" as predating the "age of chivalry" with its new literary genre of Romance. Ker would thus extend the Germanic heroic age to the point of Christianization, to the inclusion of the Scandinavian Viking Age and culminating in the Icelandic family sagas of the 13th century. Indeed, Christianization resulted in the loss of the tradition of heroic poetry, although there are examples of heroic poems that postdate Christianization by several centuries, such as The Battle of Maldon, composed three centuries after the Christianization of the Anglo-Saxons, or the Hildebrandslied, written at Fulda 300 years after the Christianization of the Franks. The Prose Edda itself originated as a handbook for skaldic poets, compiled by Snorri Sturluson more than 200 years after the Christianisation of Iceland, because poetic tradition at that time was threatened by extinction.

== Historicity ==
Germanic mythology combines purely mythological material with historical events of the heroic-age period.

Identifiable historical characters appearing in Germanic heroic poetry, notably in the Völsung and Tyrfing cycles, include:

- Gundaharius (died 437), king of the Burgundians, as Gunnar/Gunther
- Theodoric the Great (454–526) in the Þiðrekssaga as well as in Middle High German legends about Dietrich von Bern
- Attila the Hun (406–453) in the Atlakviða
- the Roman Emperors, as Kjárr

A number of tribal kings of the 5th to 6th centuries featured in heroic poetry are likely historical, but only rarely can this be established from independent historiographic traditions, as in the case of Hygelac (died c. 521), king of the Geats, who appears both in the heroic poem Beowulf and in historiographic sources such as the Liber Historiae Francorum.

== See also ==
- Germanic poetry
- Heroic poetry
- Heldenbuch
- Migration period
- The Battle of the Goths and Huns
- Widsith
- Christianization of the Germanic peoples
- Germanic paganism
- Mythical kings of Sweden
- List of legendary kings of Denmark
