= Finnesburg Fragment =

Portion of an Old English heroic poem

The "Finnesburg Fragment" (also "Finnsburh Fragment") is a portion of an Old English heroic poem in alliterative verse about a fight in which Hnæf and his 60 retainers are besieged at "Finn's fort" and attempt to hold off their attackers. The surviving text is tantalisingly brief and allusive, but comparison with other references in Old English poetry, notably Beowulf (c. 650 to 750 AD), suggests that it deals with a conflict between Danes and Frisians in Migration-Age Frisia (circa 400 AD).

== Transmission ==
The extant text is a transcript of a loose manuscript folio that was once kept at Lambeth Palace, the London residence of the Archbishops of Canterbury. This manuscript was almost certainly Lambeth Library MS 487. A British scholar, George Hickes, made the transcript some time in the late 17th century, and published it in an anthology of Anglo-Saxon and other antiquities in 1705. (This anthology also contains the first reference to the sole manuscript of Beowulf.) Since the time when the copy was made the original manuscript folio has been lost or stolen.

== Synopsis ==
The fragment is only about 50 lines long and does not specify the tribal identities of those involved. It describes a battle in which Hnæf (lines 2 and 40), elsewhere known as a Danish prince (see below), is attacked at a place called Finnsburuh "Finn's stronghold" (line 36). To judge by Beowulf, this is apparently the hall of his brother-in-law Finn, ruler of the Frisians, where he has come to spend the winter (see below). The fragment begins with Hnæf's observation that what he sees outside "is not the dawn in the East, nor is it the flight of a dragon, nor are the gables burning". What he sees is the torches of approaching attackers. Hnæf and his sixty retainers hold the doors for five days, without any falling. Then a wounded warrior turns away to talk to his chief (it is not clear on which side) and the fragment ends. Neither the cause nor the outcome of the fight are described; Klaeber has the races of the vying parties as the Danes and the Frisians (the terms Frisians and Jutes are used interchangeably throughout this work). Tolkien, on the other hand, treated the Jutes as an entirely separate ethnic group and proposed his "Jutes-on-both-sides" theory, which states that the very reason for the conflict was the presence of Jutes (alongside the respective "native" retainers in both groups) in the retinues of both Finn and Hnæf (or, more specifically, that of Hnæf's thegn Hengest), and that these Jutes were hostile to one another.

== Battle according to Beowulf ==
The context for the poem is obscure, but a version of the story also appears in a passage of the epic poem Beowulf, and some of the characters, such as Hnæf, are mentioned in other texts. The episode in Beowulf (lines 1068–1158) is about 90 lines long and appears in the form of a lay sung by Hrothgar's scop at a feast in celebration of Beowulf's recent exploit. The lay identifies Hnæf's last struggle as the aftermath of a battle described as Fres-wæl ("Frisian slaughter"). The episode is allusive and is clearly intended for an audience that already knows the story. It describes the mourning of Hildeburh after a surprise attack by the Frisians on the Danes. Hildeburh, Hnæf's sister, was married to Finn, leader of the Frisians, in an effort to make peace between the two tribes though this attempt was unsuccessful and today is seen by many scholars as the source for tragedy in the piece. She mourned for the loss of her brother, Hnæf, whose funeral pyre was shared by the son of herself and Finn. After the battle, Finn and a character named Hengest make a loyalty pact. Hengest is a leader among Hnæf's surviving warriors. The circumstances are obscure, but Hnæf's men are to stay in Finnesburgh, at least for the winter, and the Frisians are not to taunt them for following the slayer of their lord. In the end, Hengest is overcome by vengeance and slaughters Finn and his men in their own mead hall. He then loots the hall and takes Hildeburh back "to her people".

From the first glance we see many differences between the Finn Episode in Beowulf and the Finnesburg Fragment. One of the first and most prevalent differences is the absence of Hildeburh from the Finnesburg Fragment. In the Finn Episode she is an integral character, one that is affected by all action of the piece, some would even consider her to be a tragic character for this very reason. From the beginning of the story she is in mourning at the loss of her brother, Hnæf, and her sons along with many Danes to whom she owed blood loyalty, and Frisians, to whom she owed loyalty through marriage. Some view Hildeburh's marriage as one of obligation, not one of love; she was not tied so strongly to Finn or the Frisians. She is a character that is heavily debated upon by critics and scholars who argue that she is either heavily romanticized, or an extremely sympathetic character. The view of Hildeburh as a tragic or romanticized character is often viewed by scholars as being an "unconvincing assessment" because of its “lack of textual proof and emotional tenor” and because it often fails to take into account the vast difference in time and culture between modern and Anglo-Saxon audiences. Her importance to the storyline in the Finn Episode makes her absence from the Finnesburg Fragment all the more obvious. This is also true of Hengest. In the Finn Episode Hengest plays an extremely important role in the way the story plays out. He is a leader and instigates much of the action seen in the piece. Hengest is the character that “pledged” a “firm compact of peace” with the Frisians and killed Finn "in his own home". As with Hildeburh, his importance to the action in the Finn Episode makes his lack of mention in the Finnesburg Fragment all the more obvious. He is only seen once in the fragment, and that mention is not one in which he represents an important role. His action in the piece does not represent that of a leader; instead he is simply mentioned in line 17 which reads that Hengest himself stepped in afterwards ("and Hengest sylf / hwearf him on laste"). This reading, it can be argued, does put emphasis on Hengest's presence at the battle; however, it does not put him in a position of power as he is in The Finn Episode.

== Scholarly reception ==
J. R. R. Tolkien made a study of the surviving texts in an attempt to reconstruct what may have been the original story behind the Finnesburg Fragment and the "Finnesburg Episode" of Beowulf. This study was eventually edited into the book Finn and Hengest. Tolkien argues there that the story is historical, rather than legendary, in character. Tolkien also argues that Finnsburuh is most likely an error by either Hickes or his printer, since that construction appears nowhere else, and the word should be Finnesburg. It is not clear whether this was the actual name of the hall or only the poet's description of it. Where exactly the hall was, or even whether it was in Frisia, is not known.

Uniquely in the surviving Old English corpus, the fragment contains no Christian references and the burning of Hnæf is clearly pagan.

== Religious elements ==
Though the Finnesburg Fragment itself has little mention of religious elements, the text of Beowulf does. In recent times several critics have offered explanations for the Christian elements of the poem. Christopher M. Cain specifically suggests that the author was Christian and wrote the poem with parallels to the Old Testament to show the pre-Christian world in which the epic takes place. This unique approach highlights the fact that the characters such as Beowulf and Hrothgar act in a way that is still moral without being explicitly Christian.

In contrast C. Tidmarsh Major took a different approach and examined the state of religion at the time the poem was likely written. In the Middle Ages he asserts that Christianity was not at all as uniform as it is now, and neither was Germanic paganism. In fact he simply argues that it is a literary example of the overlapping and melding of pagan and Christian beliefs as they encountered one another.

== See also ==
- Old English metre
