= King Arthur (2004 film) =

Historical adventure film directed by Antoine Fuqua

- Theatrical release poster
- Directed by: Antoine Fuqua
- Written by: David Franzoni
- Produced by: Jerry Bruckheimer
- Starring: Clive Owen; Keira Knightley; Stellan Skarsgård; Stephen Dillane; Ray Winstone; Hugh Dancy; Til Schweiger; Ioan Gruffudd
- Cinematography: Slawomir Idziak
- Edited by: Conrad Buff; Jamie Pearson
- Music by: Hans Zimmer
- Production companies: Touchstone Pictures; Jerry Bruckheimer Films; World 2000 Entertainment; Green Hills Productions
- Distributed by: Buena Vista Pictures Distribution
- Release date: 7 July 2004
- Running time: 126 minutes 142 minutes (Director's cut)
- Countries: United States; United Kingdom; Ireland
- Languages: English, Scottish Gaelic
- Budget: $120 million
- Box office: $203.6 million

King Arthur is a 2004 epic historical adventure film directed by Antoine Fuqua and written by David Franzoni. It features an ensemble cast with Clive Owen as the title character, Ioan Gruffudd as Lancelot and Keira Knightley as Guinevere, along with Mads Mikkelsen, Joel Edgerton, Hugh Dancy, Ray Winstone, Ray Stevenson, Stephen Dillane, Stellan Skarsgård and Til Schweiger.

The film is unusual in reinterpreting Arthur as a Roman officer rather than the typical medieval knight. Several literary works have also done so, including David Gemmell's Ghost King, Jack Whyte's Camulod Chronicles, and perhaps the strongest influence on this film, Bernard Cornwell's Warlord series. The producers of the film attempted to market it as a more historically accurate version of the Arthurian legends, supposedly inspired by new archaeological findings. The film was shot in Ireland, England, and Wales.

King Arthur was released by Buena Vista Pictures through the Touchstone Pictures label on 7 July 2004. The film received mixed to negative reviews with critics criticizing the setting, violence and battle sequences while praising the musical score, directing, performances and cinematography and grossed $203.6 million against a production budget of $120 million.

== Plot ==
In the 5th century AD, the declining Roman Empire is withdrawing from Britannia, where the native Woads, led by Merlin, stage an insurgency. A group of Sarmatian knights and their half-British Roman commander Artorius Castus, known as "Arthur", have served their obligatory 15-year term fighting for Rome and are preparing to return home. Arthur himself plans to continue his career in Rome until Bishop Germanus orders them to complete one final mission: evacuate an important Roman family from north of Hadrian's Wall, saving them from an advancing army of invading Saxons led by the ruthless Cerdic and his son, Cynric. Alecto, the son of the family patriarch, is a viable candidate to be a future Pope. Arthur and his remaining men – Lancelot, Tristan, Galahad, Bors, Gawain, and Dagonet – reluctantly accept the mission.

Arriving at their destination, they find that the Roman patriarch Marius, who refuses to leave, has enslaved the local population, enraging Arthur. He discovers a cell complex containing several dead Woads and two tortured survivors — a young woman named Guinevere and her younger brother Lucan. Arthur frees them and gives Marius an ultimatum — leave with them willingly or otherwise be taken prisoner. He and his knights commandeer the homestead and liberate its exploited people. The convoy flees into the mountains with the Saxons in pursuit. Marius leads an attempted coup but is slain by Guinevere. Arthur learns from Alecto that Germanus and his fellow bishops had Arthur's childhood mentor and father figure Pelagius executed for heresy. This further disillusions Arthur with the Roman way of life, a process that matures when Guinevere and Merlin remind Arthur of his connection to the island of Britain through his Celtic mother.

Arthur leads the pursuing Saxons, led by Cynric, through a pass crossing a frozen lake. As battle ensues, Dagonet sacrifices himself to crack the lake ice with his axe, disrupting the Saxon advance. The knights safely deliver Alecto and his mother to Hadrian's wall and are officially discharged. Arthur, having concluded that his destiny lies with his mother's people, decides to engage the Saxons despite Lancelot's pleas to leave with them. The night before the battle, he and Guinevere have sex, and on the following day, Arthur meets Cerdic under a white flag of parley, vowing to kill him. He is soon joined by Lancelot and his fellow knights, who decide to fight. In the climactic Battle of Badon Hill, the Woads and knights whittle the Saxon army. Cynric mortally wounds Lancelot, who is able to kill Cynric before dying. Cerdic kills Tristan before facing off against Arthur, who kills the Saxon leader, condemning the invaders to defeat.

Arthur and Guinevere marry and Merlin proclaims Arthur as King of the Britons. United by their defeat of the Saxons and the retreat of the Romans, Arthur promises to lead the Britons against any future invaders. Three horses that had belonged to Tristan, Dagonet, and Lancelot run free across the landscape, as the closing narrative from Lancelot describes how fallen knights live on in tales passed from generation to generation.

== Cast ==
- Clive Owen as Artorius Castus / Arthur
- Ioan Gruffudd as Lancelot
  - Elliot Henderson-Boyle as young Lancelot
- Mads Mikkelsen as Tristan
- Joel Edgerton as Gawain
- Hugh Dancy as Galahad
- Ray Winstone as Bors
- Ray Stevenson as Dagonet
- Keira Knightley as Guinevere
- Stephen Dillane as Merlin
- Stellan Skarsgård as Cerdic
- Til Schweiger as Cynric
- Ivano Marescotti as Bishop Germanus
- Ken Stott as Marius Honorius
- Lorenzo De Angelis as Alecto
- Sean Gilder as Jols
- Clive Russell as Lancelot's father
- Stephanie Putson as Lancelot's mother
- Pat Kinevane as Horton
- Stefania Orsola Garello as Fulcinia
- Charlie Creed-Miles as Ganis
- Graham McTavish as Roman officer
- Alan Devine as British scout
- Johnny Brennan as Lucan
- David Murray as Merlin's lieutenant
- Dawn Bradfield as Vanora
- Maria Gładkowska as Igraine
- Ned Dennehy as Mental Monk
- Phelim Drew as Obnoxious Monk
- Owen Teale as Pelagius (only in director's cut)

== Production ==
The film was produced by Jerry Bruckheimer and directed by Antoine Fuqua; David Franzoni, the writer of the original draft script for Gladiator, wrote the screenplay. The historical consultant for the film was John Matthews, an author known for his books on esoteric Celtic spirituality, some of which he co-wrote with his wife Caitlin Matthews. The research consultant was Linda A. Malcor, co-author of From Scythia to Camelot: A Radical Reinterpretation of the Legends of King Arthur, the Knights of the Round Table, and the Holy Grail, in which possible non-Celtic sources for the Arthurian legends are explored.

The film's main set, a replica of a section of Hadrian's Wall, was the largest film set ever built in Ireland, and was located in a field in County Kildare. The replica was one kilometre long, which took a crew of 300 building workers four and a half months to build. The fort in the film was based on the Roman fort named Vindolanda, which was built around 80 AD just south of Hadrian's Wall in what is now called Chesterholm in Northern England.

Fuqua was reportedly dissatisfied with the film which he attributed to interference by Disney.

== Reception ==
=== Box office ===
King Arthur grossed $15 million on its opening weekend in third place behind Spider-Man 2 and Anchorman: The Legend of Ron Burgundy. It grossed $51.9 million in the United States and Canada and $151.7 million in other territories for a worldwide total of $203.6 million, against a production budget of $120 million.

=== Critical response ===
On Rotten Tomatoes, King Arthur has an approval rating of 30% based on 187 reviews with the critics consensus being "The magic is gone, leaving a dreary, generic action movie". On Metacritic, the film has a score of 46 out of 100 based on reviews from 41 critics, indicating "mixed or average" reviews. Audiences polled by CinemaScore gave the film an average grade of "B" on an A+ to F scale.

David Edelstein of Slate called the film "profoundly stupid and inept" and added, "it's an endless source of giggles once you realise that its historical revisionism has nothing to do with archeological discoveries and everything to do with the fact that no one at Disney would green-light an old-fashioned talky love triangle with a hero who dies and an adulterous heroine who ends up in a nunnery." A. O. Scott of the New York Times further remarked that the film was "a blunt, glowering B picture, shot in murky fog and battlefield smoke, full of silly-sounding pomposity and swollen music (courtesy of the prolifically bombastic Hans Zimmer). The combat scenes, though boisterous and brutal, are no more coherent than the story, which requires almost as much exposition as the last Star Wars film. Luckily there is an element of broad, brawny camp that prevents King Arthur from being a complete drag."

Roger Ebert of the Chicago Sun-Times had a more positive response to the film and awarded it three out of four stars, writing, "That the movie works is because of the considerable production qualities and the charisma of the actors, who bring more interest to the characters than they deserve. There is a kind of direct, unadorned conviction to the acting of Clive Owen and the others; raised on Shakespeare, trained for swordfights, with an idea of Arthurian legend in their heads since childhood, they don't seem out of time and place like the cast of Troy. They get on with it."

Robin Rowland denounced critics who panned the film for its Dark Age setting, and pointed out that several Arthurian novels, like Rosemary Sutcliff's Sword at Sunset and Mary Stewart's Merlin trilogy (The Crystal Cave, The Hollow Hills and The Last Enchantment), are set in the same period. However, these works have little in common with the film's story and Sarmatian angle. In response to criticism of the setting, a consultant on the film, Linda A. Malcor said: "I think these film-makers did a better job than most could have done when it comes to giving us something besides knights in tin foil and damsels in chiffon.... [they] deserve a lot of praise for the effort that they made." Fellow Arthurian scholar Geoffrey Ashe's opinion was unfavorable.

Later director Antoine Fuqua said:

When I first signed on to the movie it was to shoot an R movie, and then halfway through it - that changed, for all sorts of reasons. Obviously, it's always money... That was very difficult for me and I had a tough time adjusting to that. I had to change a lot of my shooting style that I had set up because it just wouldn't have been possible to do certain things and get a PG-13 rating, just because it would have been more graphic. Like I said, tonally, I had a whole different mindset. So once that happened, while I was filming, it made it difficult.

== Director's cut ==
An unrated director's cut of the film was released; it has extra footage of battle scenes as well as more scenes between Lancelot and Guinevere, whose traditional love triangle with Arthur is only hinted at in the theatrical version. The battle scenes are also bloodier and more graphic.

Several scenes are also omitted from the director's cut, including one where the knights sit around a campfire asking about their intended Sarmatian life, in which Bors reveals that his children do not even have names, most simply have numbers. In addition, a sex scene between Guinevere and Arthur is shifted to be chronologically before he is informed of the incoming Saxons towards Hadrian's Wall. This seemingly minor change arguably helps the story flow more smoothly. In the original film, he is seen in full battle armour, contemplating a broken image of Pelagius on his floor, and then is disturbed by a call to come outside. When he comes outside, he is hastily putting on a shirt, and his hair is disheveled. In the Director's Cut, after an intimate moment between Arthur and Guinevere explaining Arthur's morals, they carry on into their sexual encounter and are thus disturbed so that Arthur can be briefed on the Saxons. During the sexual encounter, he is wearing the same outfit he wears during the briefing. The scene where he is examining Pelagius's image is removed.

== See also ==
- List of films based on Arthurian legend
- List of historical drama films
