= Mary Stewart's Merlin Trilogy =

Novel series by Mary Stewart

- First edition
- Author: Mary Stewart
- Audio read by: Nicol Williamson
- Cover artist: Honi Werner
- Language: English
- Series: Arthurian Saga
- Genre: Fantasy
- Set in: Great Britain
- Publisher: William Morrow and Company
- Publication date: 1980
- Publication place: England
- Media type: Print
- Pages: 919
- ISBN: 0-688-00347-8
- OCLC: 6649071
- Dewey Decimal: 823.914
- LC Class: PR6069.T46 M4 1980
- Followed by: The Wicked Day

Mary Stewart's Merlin Trilogy is an omnibus edition of the first three novels in Mary Stewart's Arthurian Saga: The Crystal Cave (1970), The Hollow Hills (1973), and The Last Enchantment (1979). The omnibus was published in 1980 by William Morrow and Company. In 1983, Stewart published a fourth instalment in the series: The Wicked Day.

HarperCollins republished the omnibus as The Merlin Trilogy in 2004.

== Synopsis ==
The Crystal Cave (1970) is a first-person retelling of Merlin's life and the reign of Uther Pendragon until the conception of Uther's son, Arthur. In The Hollow Hills (1973), Merlin recounts Arthur's birth and boyhood until he is made king. The Last Enchantment (1979) is the story of Arthur's kingship as told by Merlin.

== Reception ==
In Stewart's obituary, Anita Gates of The New York Times described her as an "author of romantic thrillers who jumped genres in her 50s to create an internationally best-selling trilogy of Merlin books, reimagining the Arthurian legend from a sorcerer’s point of view. … Reading Geoffrey of Monmouth's History of the Kings of Britain, [Stewart] was inspired to retell the story of King Arthur as seen by Merlin, the king's adviser and house magician. The trilogy introduced her work to a new generation and, in many cases, to male readers for the first time. … The books, set in the fifth century, were praised for their unusual blend of fantasy and historical detail."

== See also ==
- Bibliography of King Arthur
- Matter of Britain
