= Ambrosius Aurelianus =

5th-century Romano-British warlord

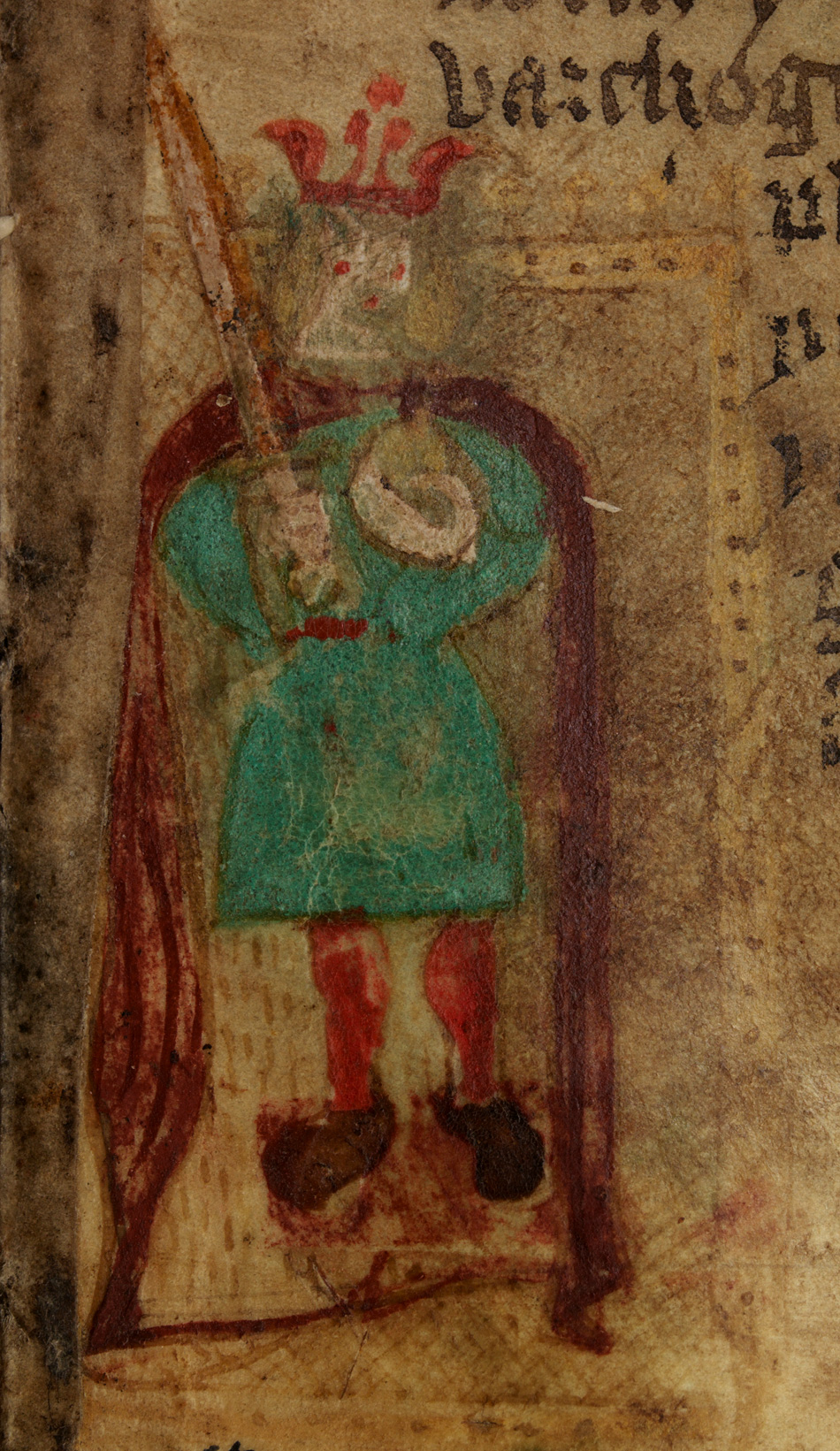
Illustration of Emrys Wledig from a 15th-century manuscript of Brut y Brenhinedd (the Historia Regum Britanniae translated into Welsh)

Ambrosius Aurelianus (Welsh: Emrys Wledig; Anglicised as Ambrose Aurelian and called Aurelius Ambrosius in the Historia Regum Britanniae and elsewhere) was a war leader of the Romano-British who won an important battle against the Anglo-Saxons in the 5th century, according to Gildas. He also appeared independently in the legends of the Britons, beginning with the 9th-century Historia Brittonum. Eventually, he was transformed by Geoffrey of Monmouth into the uncle of King Arthur, the brother of Arthur's father Uther Pendragon, as a ruler who precedes and predeceases them both. He also appears as a young prophet who meets the tyrant Vortigern; in this guise, he was later transformed into the wizard Merlin.

== According to Gildas ==
Ambrosius Aurelianus is one of the few people whom Gildas identifies by name in his sermon De Excidio et Conquestu Britanniae, and the only one named from the 5th century. De Excidio is considered the oldest extant British document about the so-called Arthurian period of Sub-Roman Britain. Following the destructive assault of the Saxons, the survivors gather together under the leadership of Ambrosius, who is described as:

a gentleman who, perhaps alone of the Romans, had survived the shock of this notable storm. Certainly his parents, who had worn the purple, were slain in it. His descendants in our day have become greatly inferior to their grandfather's [avita] excellence. Under him our people regained their strength, and challenged the victors to battle. The Lord assented, and the battle went their way.

Ambrosius was possibly of high birth and very likely a Christian: Gildas says that he won his battles "with God's help". Ambrosius's parents were slain by the Saxons and he was amongst the few survivors of their initial invasion.

According to Gildas, Ambrosius organised the survivors into an armed force and achieved the first military victory over the Saxon invaders. However, this victory was not decisive: "Sometimes the Saxons and sometimes the citizens [meaning the Romano-British inhabitants] were victorious." Due to Gildas's description of him, Ambrosius is one of the figures called the Last of the Romans.

=== Scholarship questions ===
Two points in Gildas's description have attracted much scholarly commentary. The first is what Gildas meant by saying Ambrosius' family "had worn the purple". Roman emperors and male Patricians wore clothes with a purple band to denote their class so the reference to purple may be to an aristocratic heritage. Roman military tribunes (tribuni militum), senior officers in Roman legions, wore a similar purple band so the reference may be to a family background of military leadership. The tradition was old, as the togas and pallia of already ancient senators and tribunes were trimmed with the purple band. In the church, "the purple" is a euphemism for blood and therefore "wearing the purple" may be a reference to martyrdom or a bishop's robe. In addition, in the later Roman Empire both Roman consuls and governors of consular rank also wore clothes with a purple fringe. The Notitia Dignitatum, a Roman catalogue of official posts, lists four or five provincial governors in Roman Britain and two of them were of consular rank. One was the governor of Maxima Caesariensis and the other that of Valentia. The parent who wore the purple may well have been one of these governors, whose names were not recorded.

It has been suggested by historian Alex Woolf that Ambrosius may have been related to the 5th-century Romano-British usurpers Marcus or Gratian – Woolf expresses a preference based on nomenclature for Marcus. Frank D. Reno, an Arthurian scholar, has instead argued that the name "Aurelianus" indicates the descent of Ambrosius from the Illyrian Roman emperor Aurelian (reigned 270–275). Aurelian's military campaigns included the conquest of the Gallic Empire. N. J. Higham suggests that Ambrosius may have been distantly related to imperial families of the late Roman Empire, such as the Theodosian dynasty. Branches of this particular dynasty were known to be active in western Roman provinces like Hispania.

Mike Ashley instead focuses on the name "Ambrosius" and its possible connection to Saint Ambrosius, a fourth-century Bishop of Milan, who also served as consular governor in areas of Roman Italy. The father of the Bishop is sometimes claimed to be a fourth century Praetorian prefect of Gaul named Aurelius Ambrosius, whose areas included Britain, though some modern scholars doubt that Saint Ambrosius was related to this man (instead identifying his father with an official named Uranius mentioned in an extract from the Theodosian Code). Ashley suggests that Ambrosius Aurelianus was related to the two Aurelii Ambrosii. Tim Venning points out that the name "Aurelianus" could be the result of a Roman adoption. When a boy was adopted into a new gens (clan), he received the family names of his new family but was often additionally called by a cognomen indicating his descent from his original family. The additional cognomen often had the form "-anus". When Gaius Octavius from gens Octavia was adopted by his uncle Gaius Julius Caesar, he was often distinguished from his adoptive father by the addition "Octavianus". In this case, Ambrosius may have been a member of gens Aurelia who was adopted by another gens/family.

The second question is the meaning of the word avita: Gildas could have meant "ancestors", or intended it to mean more specifically "grandfather" – thus indicating Ambrosius lived about a generation before the Battle of Badon. Lack of information prevents sure answers to these questions.

=== Gildas's motives ===
N. J. Higham, author of a book on Gildas and the literary tropes that he used, has suggested that Gildas may have had considerable motive for drawing attention to Ambrosius. He was not attempting to write a historical biography of the man, according to Higham, but setting him as an example to his contemporaries. It was essential to the philosophy of Gildas that Briton leaders who achieved victory over the barbarians were only able to do so because of divine aid. And only those who had superior Christian virtues were deserving of this aid. Ambrosius Aurelianus was apparently known for at least one such victory over the barbarians. To fit him into his worldview, Gildas was almost required to feature the former warrior as a man of exceptional virtues and obedience to God. He was made to fit Gildas's version of a model leader.

Higham also suggests that the Roman lineage of Ambrosius was highlighted for a reason. Gildas was apparently intentionally connecting him with the legitimate authority and military virtues of the Romans. He was also contrasting him with the subsequent Briton rulers whose reigns lacked in such legitimacy.

=== Identifying historical figures ===
Gildas is a primary source for the Battle of Badon, yet he never mentions the names of the combatants. It is not known if Ambrosius Aurelianus or his successors took part in the battle. The names of the Saxon leaders in the battle are not recorded.

The identities of Ambrosius's descendants are unknown, since Gildas never identifies them by name. It is assumed that they were Gildas's contemporaries and known to the author. Higham suggests that they were prominent figures of the time. Their lineage and identities were probably sufficiently familiar to his intended audience that they did not have to be named. The work portrays Ambrosius's descendants as inferior to their ancestor as part of his criticism on rulers of his time, according to Higham. Those criticised were likely aware that the vitriol was intended for them, but probably would not challenge a work offering such a glowing report of their illustrious ancestor.

Mike Ashley suggests that the descendants of Ambrosius could include other people named by Gildas. He favours the inclusion in this category of one Aurelius Caninus ("Aurelius the dog-like"), whom Gildas accuses of parricide, fornication, adultery, and warmongering. His name "Aurelius" suggests Romano-British descent. The insulting nickname "Caninus" was probably invented by Gildas himself, who similarly insults other contemporary rulers. Due to the name used by Gildas, there are theories that this ruler was actually named Conan/Cynan/Kenan. Some identify him with Cynan Garwyn, a 6th-century King of Powys, though it is uncertain if he was a contemporary of Gildas or lived one or two generations following him. Another theory is that this ruler did not reign in Britain but in Brittany. Caninus, in this view, might be Conomor ("Great Dog"). Conomor is considered a likelier contemporary of Gildas. Conomor was likely from Domnonée, an area of Brittany controlled by British immigrants from Dumnonia. He might be remembered in British legend as Mark of Cornwall.

Gildas primarily describes the Saxons as barbarian raiders; their invasions involved a slow and difficult process of military conquest. By AD 500, possibly the time described by Gildas, Anglo-Saxons controlled the Isle of Wight, Kent, Lincolnshire, Norfolk, Suffolk, and coastal areas of Northumberland and Yorkshire. The rest of the former Roman Britain was still under the control of the local Britons or remnants of the Roman provincial administration. Gildas also mentions depopulation of cities and this probably reflects historical facts. Londinium, once a major city, was completely abandoned during the 5th century.

== According to Bede ==
Bede follows Gildas's account of Ambrosius in his Ecclesiastical History of the English People, but in his Chronica Majora he dates Ambrosius's victory to the reign of the Emperor Zeno (474–491).

Bede's treatment of the 5th century history of Great Britain is not particularly valuable as a source. Until about the year 418, Bede could choose between several historical sources and often followed the writings of Orosius. Following the end of Orosius's history, Bede apparently lacked other available sources and relied extensively on Gildas. Entries from this period tend to be close paraphrases of Gildas's account with mostly stylistic changes. Bede's account of Ambrosius Aurelianus has been translated as following:

When the army of the enemy had exterminated or scattered the native peoples, they returned home and the Britons slowly began to recover strength and courage. They emerged from their hiding-places and with one accord they prayed for the help of God that they might not be completely annihilated. Their leader at that time was a certain Ambrosius Aurelianus, a discreet man, who was, as it happened, the sole member of the Roman race who had survived this storm in which his parents, who bore a royal and famous name, had perished. Under his leadership the Britons regained their strength, challenged their victors to battle, and, with God's help, won the day.

Bede does not mention the descendants of Ambrosius Aurelianus, nor their supposed degeneracy.

== According to Nennius ==
The Historia Brittonum, attributed to Nennius, preserves several snippets of lore about Ambrosius. Despite the traditional attribution, the authorship of the work and the period of its writing are open questions for modern historians. There are several extant manuscript versions of the work, varying in details. The most important ones have been dated to between the 9th and the 11th century. Some modern scholars think it unlikely that the work was composed by a single writer or compiler, suggesting that it may have taken centuries to reach its final form, though this theory is not conclusive.

In Chapter 31, we are told that Vortigern ruled in fear of Ambrosius. This is the first mention of Ambrosius in the work. According to Frank D. Reno, this would indicate that Ambrosius's influence was formidable, since Vortigern considered him more of a threat than northern invaders and attempts to restore Roman rule in Britain. The chapter relates events following the end of Roman rule in Britain and preceding Vortigern's alliance with the Saxons.

The most significant appearance of Ambrosius is the story about Ambrosius, Vortigern, and the two dragons beneath Dinas Emrys, "Fortress of Ambrosius" in Chapters 40–42. In this account, Ambrosius is still an adolescent but has supernatural powers. He intimidates Vortigern and the royal magicians. When it is revealed that Ambrosius is the son of a Roman consul, Vortigern is convinced to cede to the younger man the castle of Dinas Emrys and all the kingdoms in the western part of Britain. Vortigern then retreats to the north, in an area called Gwynessi. This story was later retold with more detail by Geoffrey of Monmouth in his fictionalised Historia Regum Britanniae, conflating the personage of Ambrosius with the Welsh tradition of Myrddin the visionary, known for oracular utterances that foretold the coming victories of the native Celtic inhabitants of Britain over the Saxons and the Normans. Geoffrey also introduces him into the Historia under the name Aurelius Ambrosius as one of three sons of Constantine III, along with Constans and Uther Pendragon.

In Chapter 48, Ambrosius Aurelianus is described as "king among all the kings of the British nation". The chapter records that Pascent, the son of Vortigern, was granted rule over the regions of Buellt and Gwrtheyrnion by Ambrosius. Finally, in Chapter 66, various events are dated from a Battle of Guoloph (often identified with Wallop, 15 km (9.3 mi) ESE of Amesbury near Salisbury), which is said to have been between Ambrosius and Vitolinus. The author dates this battle as taking place 12 years from the reign of Vortigern.

It is not clear how these various traditions about Ambrosius relate to each other, or whether they come from the same tradition; it is very possible that these references are to different men with the same name. Frank D. Reno points out that the works call all these men "Ambrosius"/"Emrys". The cognomen "Aurelianus" is never used. The Historia Brittonum dates the battle of Guoloph to "the twelfth year of Vortigern", by which the year 437 seems to be meant. This is perhaps a generation before the battle that Gildas may imply was commanded by Ambrosius Aurelianus.

The text never identifies who Ambrosius's father is, just gives his title as a Roman consul. When an adolescent Ambrosius speaks of his father, there is no suggestion that this father is deceased. The boy is not identified as an orphan. The exact age of Ambrosius is not given in his one encounter with Vortigern. Frank D. Reno suggests that he might be as young as 13 years old, barely a teenager.

It is impossible to know to what degree Ambrosius actually wielded political power, and over what area. Ambrosius and Vortigern are shown as being in conflict in the Historia Brittonum, and some historians have suspected that this preserves a historical core of the existence of two parties in opposition to one another, one headed by Ambrosius and the other by Vortigern. J. N. L. Myres built upon this suspicion and speculated that belief in Pelagianism reflected an actively provincial outlook in Britain and that Vortigern represented the Pelagian party, while Ambrosius led the Catholic one. Subsequent historians accepted Myres's speculation as fact, creating a narrative of events in 5th century Britain with various degrees of elaborate detail. Yet a simpler alternative interpretation of the conflict between these two figures is that the Historia Brittonum is preserving traditions hostile to the purported descendants of Vortigern, who at this time were a ruling house in Powys. This interpretation is supported by the negative character of all of the stories retold about Vortigern in the Historia Brittonum, which include his alleged practice of incest.

The identity of Ambrosius's last mentioned enemy, Vitalinus, is somewhat obscure. Various manuscripts of the Historia and translations also render his name as "Guitolin", "Guitolini", and "Guitholini". He is mentioned in chapter 49 as one of four sons of Gloyw and co-founder of the city of Gloucester. No other background information is given. There are theories that Gloyw is also the father of Vortigern, but the genealogy is obscure and no supporting primary text can be found. There have been further attempts to identify Vitalinus with a pro-Vortigern or anti-Roman faction in Britain, opposed to the rise of the Romano-British Ambrosius. However, this is rendered problematic since Vitalinus seems to also have a Romano-British name. The traditional view of pro-Roman and pro-Briton factions active in this period might oversimplify a more complex situation.

== According to William of Malmesbury ==
Ambrosius appears briefly in the Gesta Regum Anglorum ("Deeds of the Kings of the English") by William of Malmesbury. Despite its name, the work attempted to reconstruct British history in general by drawing together the varying accounts of Gildas, Bede, Nennius, and various chroniclers. The work features Ambrosius as the apparent employer of Arthur. The relevant passage has been translated as follows:

On the death of Vortimer, the strength of the Britons grew faint, their diminished hopes went backwards; and straight-way they would have come to ruin, had not Ambrosius, the sole survivor of the Romans, who was monarch of the realm after Vortigern, repressed the overweening barbarians through the distinguished achievements of the warlike Arthur.

William swiftly shifts attention from Ambrosius to Arthur, and proceeds to narrate Arthur's supposed victory in the Battle of Badon. The narrative is probably the first to connect Ambrosius and Arthur. William had to reconcile the accounts of Gildas and Bede who implied that Ambrosius was connected to the battle, and that of Nennius which clearly stated that it was Arthur who was connected to the battle. He solved the apparent discrepancy by connecting both of them to it: Ambrosius as the king of the Britons and Arthur as his most prominent general and true victor of the battle.

== According to Geoffrey of Monmouth ==
Ambrosius Aurelianus appears in later pseudo-chronicle tradition beginning with Geoffrey of Monmouth's Historia Regum Britanniae with the slightly garbled name Aurelius Ambrosius, now presented as son of a King Constantine. King Constantine's eldest son Constans is murdered at Vortigern's instigation, and the two remaining sons (Ambrosius and Uther, still very young) are quickly hustled into exile in Brittany. (This does not fit with Gildas' account, in which Ambrosius' family perished in the turmoil of the Saxon uprisings.) Later, the two brothers return from exile with a large army when Vortigern's power has faded. They destroy Vortigern and become friends with Merlin. They go on to defeat the Saxon leader Hengist in two battles at Maisbeli (probably Ballifield, near Sheffield) and Cunengeburg. Hengist is executed and Ambrosius becomes king of Britain. However, he is poisoned by his enemies, and Uther succeeds him. The text identifies the poisoner as Eopa.

Judgements vary wildly of the value of Geoffrey as both a historian and a literary storyteller. He has been praised for giving us detailed information about an otherwise obscure period and possibly preserving information from lost sources, and condemned for an excessive use of artistic licence and possibly inventing stories wholecloth. According to Frank D. Reno, whenever Geoffrey uses extant sources, the details in the text tend to be accurate. Assuming that he was also using sources lost to us, it may be difficult to decide which details are truthful. Reno suggests that "individual judgements" have to be made about various elements of his narrative.

Geoffrey changed the word "Aurelianus" to "Aurelius", which is the name of a Roman gens. Geoffrey retains the story of Emrys and the dragons from Nennius, but identifies the figure with Merlin. Merlin is Geoffrey's version of a historical figure known as Myrddin Wyllt. Myrddin is only mentioned once in the Annales Cambriae, at an entry dated to 573. The name of Merlin is given in Latin as Ambrosius Merlinus. "Merlinus" may have been intended as the agnomen of a Roman or Romano-British individual like Ambrosius.

Elements of Ambrosius Aurelianus, the traditional warrior king, are used by Geoffrey for other characters. Ambrosius' supposed supernatural powers are passed to Merlin. Geoffrey's Aurelius Ambrosius rises to the throne but dies early, passing the throne to a previously unknown brother called Uther Pendragon. The role of warrior king is shared by Uther and his son Arthur.

Geoffrey also uses the character Gloiu, father of Vitalinus/Vitolinus, derived from Nennius. He names this character as a son of Claudius and appointed by his father as Duke of the Welsh. His predecessor as Duke is called Arvirargus. Assuming that Claudius and Arvirargus are supposed to be contemporaries, then this Claudius is the Roman emperor Claudius I (reigned 41–54). It seems unlikely that Claudius would have living grandsons in the 5th century, four centuries following his death. Reno suggests that Claudius II (reigned 268–270) would be a more likely "Claudius" to have living descendants in the 5th century.

Geoffrey for the first time gives a genealogy of Ambrosius. He is supposedly a paternal nephew of Aldroenus, King of Brittany, son of Constantine and an unnamed Briton noblewoman, adoptive grandson (on his mother's side) of Guthelinus/Vitalinus, Bishop of London, younger brother of Constans and older brother of Uther Pendragon. Ambrosius and Uther are supposedly raised by their adoptive maternal grandfather Guthelinus/Vitalinus. It is not explicitly covered in Geoffrey's narrative, but this genealogy makes Constantine and his children descendants of Conan Meriadoc, legendary founder of the line of Kings of Brittany. Conan is also featured in the Historia Regum Britanniae, where he is appointed king by Roman emperor Magnus Maximus (reigned 383–388).

Constantine's reign is placed by Geoffrey as following the Groans of the Britons mentioned by Gildas. Constantine is reported killed by a Pict and his reign is followed by a brief succession crisis. Candidates for the throne included all three sons of Constantine, but there were problems for their eventual rise to the throne. Constans was a monk, and Ambrosius and Uther were underage and still in their cradle. The crisis is resolved when Vortigern places Constans on the throne, and then serves as his chief adviser and power behind the throne. When Constans is killed by the Picts serving as bodyguards of Vortigern, Vortigern feigns anguish and has the killers executed. Ambrosius is still underage and Vortigern rises to the throne.

The chronology offered by Geoffrey for the early life of Ambrosius contradicts Gildas and Nennius, and is also internally inconsistent. The Groans of the Britons involves an appeal by the Britons to Roman consul "Agitius". This person has been identified with Flavius Aetius (d. 454), magister militum ("master of soldiers") of the Western Roman Empire and consul of the year 446. The Groans are generally dated to the 440s and 450s, preceding the death of Aetius. If Geoffrey's Constantine rose to the throne immediately following the Groans, this would place his reign in this period. Geoffrey gives a 10-year reign for Constantine and his marriage lasts just as long. However the eldest son Constans is clearly older than 10 years by the time his father dies. He is already an adult candidate of the throne and has had time to follow a monastic career. Even assuming there is a time gap between the death of Constantine and the adulthood of Constans, his younger brothers have not aged at all in the narrative. Geoffrey's narrative has an underage Ambrosius, if not a literal infant, in the 460s. Accounts deriving from Gildas and Nennius place Ambrosius in the prime of his life in the same decade. Most telling is that Geoffrey has Vortigern rising to the throne in the 460s. Nennius places the rise of Vortigern in the year 425, and Vortigern is entirely absent in chronologies of the 460s, suggesting that he was deceased by that time.

Geoffrey's narrative includes as a major character Hengist, as leader of the Saxons. He is featured as the father of Queen Rowena and father-in-law of Vortigern. Other Saxon characters in the narrative tend to receive less attention by the writer, but their names tend to correspond to Anglo-Saxons known from other sources. Henginst's supposed son Octa is apparently Octa of Kent, a 6th-century ruler variously connected to Hengist as a son or descendant. The other son, Ebissa, is more difficult to identify. He might correspond to kinsmen of Hengist variously identified as "Ossa", "Oisc", and "Aesc". A minor Saxon character called "Cherdic" is probably Cerdic of Wessex, though elsewhere Geoffrey calls the same king "Cheldric". He actually may appear under three different names in the narrative, since Geoffrey elsewhere calls the interpreter of Hengist "Ceretic", a variant of the same name.

Geoffrey, in the last chapters featuring Vortigern, has the king served by magicians. This detail derives from Nennius, though Nennius was talking about Vortigern's "wise men". They may not have been magic users but advisers. Vortigern's encounter with Emrys/Merlin takes place in this part of the narrative. Merlin warns Vortigern that Ambrosius and Uther have already sailed for Britain and are soon to arrive, apparently to claim his throne. Ambrosius soon arrives at the head of the army and is crowned king. He besieges Vortigern at the castle of "Genoreu", which is identified with Nennius' Cair Guorthigirn ("Fort Vortigern") and the hillfort at Little Doward. Ambrosius burns the castle down and Vortigern dies with it.

Having killed Vortigern, Ambrosius next turns his attention to Hengist. Despite the fact that no earlier military actions of Ambrosius are recorded, the Saxons have already heard of his bravery and battle prowess. They immediately retreat beyond the Humber. Hengist soon amasses a massive army to face Ambrosius. His army counts 200,000 men and Ambrosius' only 10,000 men. He marches south and the first battle between the two armies takes place in Maisbeli, where Ambrosius emerges the victor. It is unclear what location Geoffrey had in mind. Maisbeli translates to "the field of Beli", and could be related to the Beli Mawr of Welsh legend and/or the Celtic god Belenus. Alternatively it could be a field where the Beltane festival was celebrated. Geoffrey could derive the name from a similar-sounding toponym. For example, Meicen of the Hen Ogledd ("Old North"), traditionally identified with Hatfield.

Following his defeat, Hengist retreats towards Cunungeburg. Geoffrey probably had in mind Conisbrough, not far from Hatfield. Ambrosius leads his army against the new position of the Saxons. The second battle is more evenly fought, and Hengist has a chance to achieve victory. However, Ambrosius receives reinforcements from Brittany and the tide of the battle turns in favour of the Britons. Hengist himself is captured by his old enemy Eldol, Consul of Gloucester and decapitated. Soon after the battle, the surviving Saxon leaders Octa and Eosa submit themselves to Ambrosius' rule. He pardons them and grants them an area near Scotland. The area is not named, but Geoffrey could be basing this on Bernicia, a real Anglo-Saxon kingdom covering areas in the modern borders of Scotland and England.

Geoffrey closely connects the deaths of Vortigern and Hengist, which are elsewhere poorly recorded. Vortigern historically died in the 450s, and various dates for the death of Hengist have been proposed, between the 450s and the 480s. Octa of Kent, the supposed son and heir of Hengist, was still alive in the 6th century and seems to belong to a later historical era than his father. The ruling family of the Kingdom of Kent were called the Oiscingas, a term identifying them as descendants of Oisc of Kent, not of Hengist. In effect, none of them was likely a literal son of Hengist and their relation to Hengist may have been a later invention. Geoffrey did not invent the connection, but his sources here were likely legendary in nature.

Following his victories and the end of the wars, Ambrosius organises the burial of killed nobles at Kaercaradduc. Geoffrey identifies this otherwise unknown location with Caer-Caradog (Salisbury). Ambrosius wants a permanent memorial for the slain and assigns the task to Merlin. The result is the so-called Giants' Ring. Its location in the vicinity of Salisbury has led to its identification with Stonehenge, though Geoffrey never uses that term. Stonehenge is closer to Amesbury than Salisbury. The ring formation of the monument could equally apply to Avebury, the largest stone circle in Europe.

== In other texts ==
In Welsh legend and texts, Ambrosius appears as Emrys Wledig (Emperor Ambrose). The term "Wledig" is a title used by notable royal and military commanders. It is mostly used for famous figures such as Cunedda, and the Roman emperor Magnus Maximus ("Macsen Wledig") when he appears in Welsh folklore.

In Robert de Boron's Merlin, he is called simply Pendragon and his younger brother is named Uter, which he changes to Uterpendragon after the death of the elder sibling. This is probably a confusion that entered oral tradition from Wace's Roman de Brut. Wace usually only refers to li roi ("the king") without naming him, and someone has taken an early mention of Uther's epithet Pendragon as the name of his brother.

Richard Carew's Survey of Cornwall (1602) drew on an earlier French writer, Nicholas Gille, who mentions Moigne, brother of Aurelius and Uther, who was duke of Cornwall, and "gouerner of the Realme" under Emperor Honorius.

== Possible identification with other figures ==
=== Riothamus ===
Léon Fleuriot has suggested Ambrosius is identical to Riothamus, a Brythonic leader who fought a major battle against the Goths in France around the year 470. Fleuriot argues that Ambrosius led the Britons in the battle, in which he was defeated and forced to retreat to Burgundy. Fleuriot proposed that he then returned to Britain to continue the war against the Saxons.

== Place-name evidence ==
It has been suggested that the place-name Amesbury in Wiltshire might preserve the name of Ambrosius, and that perhaps Amesbury was the seat of his power base in the later fifth century. Scholars such as Shimon Applebaum have found a number of place names through the Midland dialect regions of Britain that incorporate the ambre- element; examples include Ombersley in Worcestershire, Ambrosden in Oxfordshire, Amberley in Herefordshire, Amberley in Gloucestershire, and Amberley in West Sussex. These scholars have claimed that this element represents an Old English word amor, the name of a woodland bird. However, Amesbury in Wiltshire is in a different dialect region and does not easily fit into the pattern of the Midland dialect place names.

== Modern fictional treatments ==
- Alfred Duggan's Conscience of the King (1951), a historical novel about Cerdic, founder of the Anglo-Saxon kingdom of Wessex, depicts Ambrosius Aurelianus as a Romano-British general who rose independently to military power, forming alliances with various British kings and setting out to drive the invading Saxons from Britain. Cerdic, who is of both Germanic and British descent and raised as a Roman citizen, served in his army as a young man. In the novel, Ambrosius is a separate character from Arthur, or Artorius, who appears much later as a foe of Cerdic.
- In Henry Treece's 1956 The Great Captains, Ambrosius is the aged and blind Count of Britain who is deposed by the Celt Artos the Bear after the latter takes his sword of command, Caliburn, and plunges it into a tree stump, daring him to pull it out.
- In Rosemary Sutcliff's 1959 The Lantern Bearers, a historical novel for children, Prince Ambrosius Aurelianus of Arfon fights the Saxons by training his British army with Roman techniques and making effective use of cavalry. By the end of the novel, the elite cavalry wing is led by his nephew, a dashing young warrior prince named Artos, whom Sutcliff postulates to be the real Arthur. In the sequel Sword at Sunset (1963), Artos eventually succeeds an ailing Ambrosius as High King after he deliberately gets himself killed while hunting.
- Mary Stewart's bestselling 1970 fantasy novel The Crystal Cave follows Geoffrey of Monmouth in calling him Aurelius Ambrosius and portrays him as the father of Merlin, younger brother of the assassinated Constantine and older brother of Uther (hence uncle of Arthur), an initiate of Mithras, and admired by everyone except the Saxons. Much of the book is set at his Romanized court in Brittany or during the campaign to retake his throne from Vortigern. He and Merlin both agree that Merlin is not as suited to the High Kingship as Uther, so after Ambrosius' death, Merlin willingly becomes Uther's, then Arthur's, seer and counsellor. Later books in the series show that Merlin's attitude toward Arthur is influenced by his belief that Arthur is a virtual reincarnation of Ambrosius, who is seen through Merlin's eyes as a model of good kingship.
- In Parke Godwin's 1980 historical fantasy novel Firelord, Ambrosius is the elderly tribune of the diminished, dispirited and politically fractured Legio VI Victrix garrisoning Hadrian's Wall. Near his death, he names Artorius Pendragon (Arthur) as his successor, encourages him to convert the legion to alae (heavy cavalry) and allows the legionnaires to renounce their loyalty to Rome and take personal oaths of fealty to Artorius, in order to help unify Brittania politically and to create a military force with the ability to quickly redeploy to meet differing threats.
- In Marion Zimmer Bradley's 1983 historical fantasy The Mists of Avalon, Aurelianus is depicted as the ageing High King of Britain, a "too-ambitious" son of a Western Roman Emperor. His sister's son is Uther Pendragon, but Uther is described as not having any Roman blood. Aurelianus is unable to gather the leadership of the native Celts, who refuse to follow any but their own race.
- In Stephen R. Lawhead's Pendragon Cycle (1987–1999), Aurelianus (most often referred to as "Aurelius") figures prominently, along with his brother Uther, in the second book of the series, Merlin. He is poisoned soon after becoming High King of Britain, and Uther succeeds him. Lawhead alters the standard Arthurian story somewhat, in that he has Aurelius marry Igraine and become the true father of King Arthur (Uther does marry his brother's widow, though).
- In Jack Whyte's Camulod Chronicles (1992–2018), Ambrosius Aurelianus is the half-brother of Caius Merlyn Britannicus (Merlin) and helps him lead the people of Camulod (Camelot).
- In Valerio Massimo Manfredi's 2002 novel The Last Legion, Aurelianus (here called "Aurelianus Ambrosius Ventidius") is a major character and is shown as one of the last loyal Romans, going to enormous lengths for his boy emperor Romulus Augustus, whose power has been wrested by the barbarian Odoacer. In this story, Romulus Augustus marries Igraine, and King Arthur is their son, and the sword of Julius Caesar becomes the legendary Excalibur in Britain. In the 2007 film version of the novel, he is played by Colin Firth and his name becomes "Aurelianus Caius Antonius". In both he is called "Aurelius" for short.
- The science fiction novel Coalescent (2004) by Stephen Baxter depicts Aurelianus as a general to Artorius, Briton and basis for the legend of King Arthur. In Baxter's novel, Aurelianus is a minor character who interacts with the book's main Roman-era protagonist, Regina, founder of a (literally) underground matriarchal society. In the text, he is credited with winning the Battle of Mount Badon.
- Several 2005–2006 episodes of the TV show Stargate SG-1 are devoted to Arthuriana, during which the space-faring researchers learn that Ambrosius and Arthur are one and the same. He was said to be the son of Emperor Constantine, his Queen was Guinevere, and he was called the "Once and Future King". Merlin was an Ancient fleeing from Atlantis who later Ascends, then comes back in order to build the Sangraal, or Holy Grail, to defeat the Ori. Daniel Jackson also comments that it would mean that Ambrosius was 74 at the Battle of Mount Badon.
- The 2015 time travel romance novel Refine by Nichole Van shows Aurelius Ambrosius as the heroine's father who sends her to a future time with the help of a magical portal.
- Ambrosius (voiced by Owen Teale) is a major character in the 2020 Audible Original drama Albion: The Legend of Arthur, in which he is depicted as the uncle of Arthur and having a son named Cunan.

== Sources ==
- Ashley, Mike (2005), "De Excidio", The Mammoth Book of King Arthur, Hachette, ISBN 978-1780333557
- Ashley, Mike (2005), "Geoffrey of Monmouth", The Mammoth Book of King Arthur, Hachette, ISBN 978-1780333557
- Craughwell, Thomas J (2008), "Ambrosius and Arthur", How the Barbarian Invasions Shaped the Modern World: The Vikins, Vandals, Huns, Mongols, Goths, and Tartars who razed the Old World and formed the New, Fair Winds Press, ISBN 978-1616734329
- Higham, N. J. (1994), "Gildas and the Saxons", The English Conquest: Gildas and Britain in the Fifth Century, Manchester University Press, ISBN 978-0719040801
- Korrel, Peter (1984), "Arthur, Modred, and Guinevere in the historical records and in the legendary Arthurian material in the early Welsh tradition", An Arthurian Triangle: A Study of the Origin, Development, and Characterization of Arthur, Guinevere, and Modred., Brill Archive, ISBN 978-9004072725
- Reno, Frank D. (1996), "Ambrosius Aurelianus:History and Tradition", The Historic King Arthur: Authenticating the Celtic hero of post-Roman Britain., McFarland & Company, ISBN 978-0786402663
- Venning, Tim (2013), "Ambrosius Aurelianus", The Kings & Queens of Wales, Amberley Publishing Limited, ISBN 978-1445615776

Legendary titles
Preceded by Vortigern	King of Britain	Succeeded by Uther Pendragon
