= The Prince and the Pilgrim =

1995 Book by Mary Stewart

- First UK edition
- Author: Mary Stewart
- Language: English
- Series: Arthurian Saga
- Genre: Fantasy novel
- Publisher: Hodder & Stoughton (UK); William Morrow (US)
- Publication date: 1995
- Publication place: United Kingdom
- Media type: Print Hardback
- Pages: 292 pages
- ISBN: 0-340-64992-5
- OCLC: 34002715
- Preceded by: The Wicked Day

The Prince and the Pilgrim is a 1995 fantasy novel by Mary Stewart. It is a stand-alone novel, has an oblique reference to King Arthur, and is not a part of Stewart's Merlin Trilogy. It marked Stewart's return to the Arthurian genre a decade after her last book on the subject.

== Plot ==
The Prince, the protagonist, is named Alexander. His father, Prince Baudouin, is murdered by the king of Cornwall, King March. When Alexander comes of age, he sets out to Camelot to seek justice from King Arthur and to avenge his father's death.

The Pilgrim is named Alice. She rescues a young French nobleman who has in his possession an enchanted silver cup. The chalice may be the mysterious and much-sought-after Holy Grail.

Prince Alexander is diverted in his quest by the enchantments of Morgan le Fay, the seductive but evil sorceress. She persuades him to attempt a theft of the cup so that she can gain power over King Arthur and his court. Alexander's search for the mysterious cup leads him to Alice. Together the prince and the pilgrim find what they have really been seeking: love.

The tale is a self-contained novel taking place during Arthur's reign (possibly during the events in The Last Enchantment), and does not continue the story of The Wicked Day. It covers the time before Merlin the Enchanter's defeat.

=== Author ===
Stewart is best known for her Merlin series, which is based on a number of other stories including T. H. White's The Once and Future King Other books on the topic on which she may have drawn include:

- Culhwch and Olwen, anonymous (c. 11th–12th century)
- Le Morte d'Arthur by Sir Thomas Malory (1485)

== Release ==
- 1995, Great Britain. Hodder & Stoughton (ISBN 0-340-64992-5). Publication date November 1995. Hardcover.
- 1996, USA. William Morrow and Company (ISBN 0-6881-4538-8). Publication date January 1996. Hardcover.
- 1997, USA. Ballantine/Fawcett Crest (ISBN 0-449-22443-0). Publication date April 1997. Paperback.
