= Niniane =

Niniane can refer to:

- A priestess in Arthurian legend who succeeded Viviane as Lady of the Lake, also portrayed in
  - Merlin der Zauberer by Wolfgang Müller von Königswinter
  - The Last Enchantment by Mary Stewart
  - The Mists of Avalon by Marion Zimmer Bradley
  - "Niniane (Lady Of The Lake)", a song by Dutch group Kayak (band)
