= Wing commander =

Commissioned rank in the RAF and air forces of other Commonwealth countries

Wing commander (Wg Cdr or W/C) is a senior officer rank used by some air forces, with origins from the Royal Air Force. The rank is used by air forces of many countries that have historical British influence.

Wing commander is immediately senior to squadron leader and immediately below group captain. It is usually equivalent to the rank of commander in the navy and the rank of lieutenant colonel in other services.

The equivalent rank in the Women's Auxiliary Air Force and the Women's Royal Air Force (until 1968) and in Princess Mary's Royal Air Force Nursing Service (until 1980) was wing officer. The equivalent rank in the Royal Observer Corps (until 1995) was observer commander, which had a similar rank insignia.

== Origins ==
Known in the Roman Empire as Ala (Latin for wing) and to the Vikings as Vængr (Old Norse for wing), infantry wings and cavalry wings have long been designated as the left and right flanking units of a military formation on the battlefield. The winged hussars of Poland also often operated as wing units. Wing Commanders or Wing Officers were those placed in charge of their wings.

Still to this day, in football and rugby union, there are positions known as wings or wingers, derived from these military origins. As well, the sport of ice hockey also has a winger.

== Canada ==
The rank was used in the Royal Canadian Air Force until the 1968 unification of the Canadian Forces, when army-type rank titles were adopted. Canadian wing commanders then became lieutenant colonels. In official Canadian French usage, the rank title was lieutenant-colonel d'aviation.

In the 1990s, the Canadian Forces Air Command (the post-1968 RCAF) altered the structure of those bases under its control, redesignating them as wings. The commander of such an establishment was re-designated as the "wing commander" (or "Wg Comd"). Like the United States Air Force usage, the term "wing commander" (as used in the Canadian Forces and again in the RCAF) is an appointment, not a rank. A wing commander usually holds the rank of colonel.

On 16 August 2011, the Government of Canada announced that the name "Air Command" was being changed to the air force's original historic name of Royal Canadian Air Force. Though traditional insignia for the RCAF was restored in 2015, there has been no restoration of the traditional RCAF officer rank structure that paralleled the RAF.

== United Kingdom ==
Wing commander
- Shoulder and sleeve insignia

- Masthead distinguishing flag
- Country: United Kingdom
- Service branch: Royal Air Force
- Abbreviation: Wg Cdr / WGCDR / W/C
- Rank group: Senior officers
- NATO rank code: OF-4
- Formation: August 1919
- Next higher rank: Group captain
- Next lower rank: Squadron leader
- Equivalent ranks: Commander (RN); Lieutenant colonel (British Army; RM)

Related articles
- History: Royal Naval Air Service

=== Origins ===
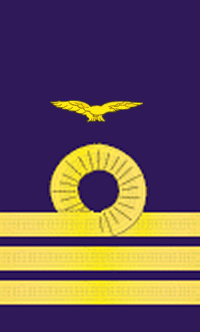
The rank insignia of a Royal Naval Air Service wing commander

On 1 April 1918, the newly created RAF adopted its officer rank titles from the British Army, with Royal Naval Air Service captains and Royal Flying Corps colonels officially becoming colonels in the RAF. In practice, there was some inconsistency, with some former naval officers using their former ranks unofficially. In response to the proposal that the RAF should use its own rank titles, it was suggested that the RAF might use the Royal Navy's officer ranks, with the word "air" inserted before the naval rank title. For example, the rank that later became wing commander would have been "air commander". Although the Admiralty objected to this simple modification of their rank titles, it was agreed that the RAF might base many of its officer rank titles on naval officer ranks with differing pre-modifying terms. It was also suggested that RAF lieutenant colonels might be entitled reeves or wing-leaders. However, the rank title wing commander was chosen as wings were typically commanded by RAF lieutenant colonels, and the term wing commander had been used in the Royal Naval Air Service. The rank of wing commander was introduced in August 1919 and has been used continuously since then.

=== Usage ===
In the early years of the RAF, a wing commander commanded a flying wing, typically a group of three or four aircraft squadrons. In current usage a wing commander is more likely to command a wing which is an administrative sub-division of an RAF station. A flying squadron is normally commanded by a wing commander but is occasionally commanded by a squadron leader for small units. In the Air Training Corps, a wing commander is usually the officer commanding of a wing.

=== Insignia and command flag ===
The rank insignia is based on the three gold bands of commanders in the Royal Navy and consists of three narrow light blue bands over slightly wider black bands. This is worn on both the lower sleeves of the tunic or on the shoulder of the flight suit or the casual uniform.

The command pennant is two triangular command pennants used in the RAF. Two thin red lines differentiate this one from the other.

During 1941-45 RAF Fighter Command's wing leaders (of wing commander rank) were also allowed to use their own initials as aircraft identification letters on their personal aircraft, e.g., Wing Commander Roland Beamont's personal Hawker Tempest, JN751, was coded "R-B", Wing Commander John Robert Baldwin's personal Hawker Typhoon was coded "J-B".

An RAF wing commander's sleeve/shoulder insignia

An RAF wing commander's sleeve mess insignia

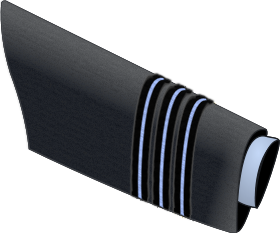
An RAF wing commander's sleeve on No. 1 service dress uniform

== United States ==
=== United States Air Force ===
In the United States Air Force (USAF), a wing commander is a command billet, not a rank. The position is most often filled by a colonel (some USAF wings are commanded by a brigadier general) who typically has command of an air wing with several group commanders (also a position, not a USAF rank) reporting to him/her.

=== United States Navy ===
In the United States Navy (USN), a wing commander is also a command billet, not a rank. The equivalent USN rank is a captain. Navy wing commanders are either Naval Aviators or Naval Flight Officers who typically have command of a carrier air wing or a "functional" air wing or air group such as a strike fighter wing, a patrol and reconnaissance wing, a tactical air control group, or a training air wing, with several squadron commanding officers reporting to him/her. Those officers commanding carrier air wings are called "CAG," dating back to when carrier air wings were called carrier air groups. Those officers commanding functional air wings and air groups are called "commodore." Unlike USAF, "group" commands in USN are either equal to or senior to an air wing.

=== Civil Air Patrol (United States Air Force Auxiliary) ===
The Civil Air Patrol, the volunteer auxiliary of the USAF, follows the USAF rank structure. The CAP divides the nation into 52 wings (each corresponding to a state, territory, and District of Columbia). Each wing is headed by a CAP colonel, who holds the position of wing commander.

== Gallery ==
(Royal Australian Air Force)

(Bangladesh Air Force)

(Ghana Air Force)

(Indian Air Force)

(Namibian Air Force)

(Nigerian Air Force)

(Pakistan Air Force)

(Sri Lanka Air Force)

(Royal Air Force)

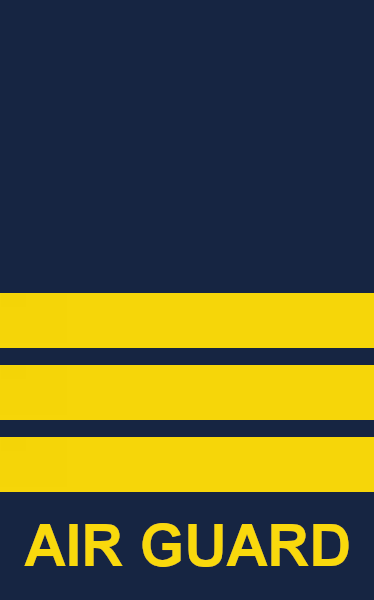
(Trinidad and Tobago Air Guard)

(Air Force of Zimbabwe)

== Notable wing commanders ==
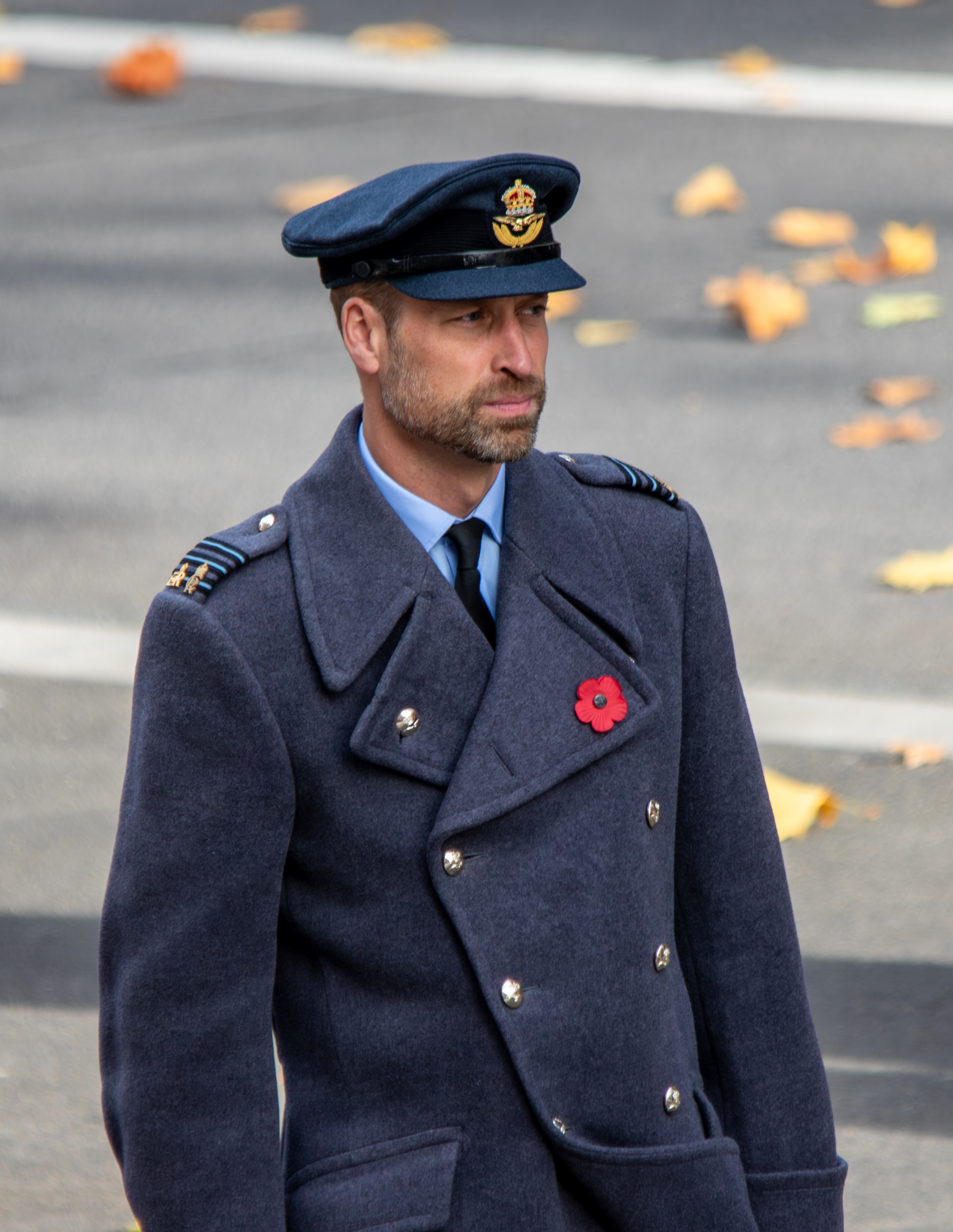
William, Prince of Wales in Wing Commander uniform, 2025

- Douglas Bader – World War II fighter pilot and double amputee, was the first commander to lead formations of three or more squadrons during the Battle of Britain.
- Roland Beamont – World War II fighter pilot and post-war test pilot
- Abdel Latif Boghdadi – pilot in the Egyptian Air Force turned politician
- Pierre Clostermann – World War II fighter pilot and author of The Big Show
- Linda Corbould – first woman to command a RAAF flying squadron
- Roald Dahl – World War II fighter pilot, and famous novelist. His record of five aerial victories has been confirmed by post-war research and cross-referenced in Axis records. (He ended the war with the temporary rank of wing commander; substantive rank was squadron leader.)
- Roly Falk – test pilot on the maiden flight of the Avro Vulcan
- Brendan "Paddy" Finucane – top ranking RAF World War II ace with 32 kills. A native of Rathmines, Dublin, Ireland (who emigrated to Britain with his family in 1936), he was the youngest wing commander in the history of the RAF. He was promoted to the rank in 1942 at age 21 and was shot down and killed soon afterwards.
- Preller Geldenhuys – combat pilot in the Rhodesian Air Force, survivor of the Rhodesian Bush War and author of Rhodesian Air Force Operations
- Guy Gibson – commanding officer of 617 Squadron and leader of the "Dam Busters" raid
- Andy Green – current holder of the land speed record and first person to break the sound barrier on land
- M. Hamidullah Khan TJ, SH, BP – Fought two wars in South Asia, 1965 Indo Pak War, Bangladesh War of Independence 1971. First and third provost marshal and commander of Ground Defense Command of the Bangladesh Air Force.
- Walter "Taffy" Holden (Holden's Lightning flight) – Commander of No. 33 Maintenance Unit RAF; inadvertently took off in an English Electric Lightning during ground testing; landed safely despite his only prior experience being with light training aircraft.
- Humphrey de Verd Leigh – inventor of the Leigh light which was developed to spotlight U-boats as they surfaced at night. The Leigh light is reputed to have changed the course of the Battle of the Atlantic in World War II
- Norman Macmillan – Aviation author and pilot of the first attempt to fly around the world in 1922.
- Mervyn Middlecoat – fighter pilot who served in the Pakistan Air Force.
- Nouman Ali Khan – Wing Commander of the Pakistan Air Force who downed an Indian Air Force MiG-21 piloted by Abhinandan Varthamanand and crashed in Pakistan administered Kashmir on 27 February 2019. He was conferred with Sitar-e-Jurat for his bravery
- Peter Overton – A news presenter & journalist for the 9 Network Australia and 60 Minutes Australia. He is a Wing Commander in the Royal Australian Air Force as a specialist reserve public affairs officer.
- Michael Sutton OBE - led the first Typhoon deployment on operations over Iraq and Syria. The only typhoon pilot to have used the aircraft's gun in combat. Author of bestselling memoir Typhoon.
- Charlotte Joanne Thompson-Edgar ARRC is a British nurse. She served as the United Kingdom's Officer Commanding Medical Emergency Response Teams in Afghanistan and in 2015, while holding the rank of Squadron Leader, was awarded an Associate of the Royal Red Cross (ARRC) for her services to the Princess Mary's Royal Air Force Nursing Service.
- Abhinandan Varthaman – Wing Commander of the Indian Air Force. A package of PAF jets entred indian airspace intercepted by Abhinandan Varthman. It was claimed that he shot down a PAF F-16 in a dog fight with his MIG 21. His aircraft was shot down after he shoot down, at least according to some Indian claims, an F-16 of PAF in an aerial dogfight and he was held captive for 60 hours in Pakistan. However, there has been no independent verification of the Indian claim of any Pakistani F-16 being shot down. In fact, according to a Reuters report, a count by the United States had shown that no Pakistan F-16s had been shot down in the dogfight.
- Ken Wallis – World War II fighter pilot, aircraft engineer, and multiple world record holder in autogyro aircraft flight
- Adrian Warburton – legendary for his role as a reconnaissance aviator in the defence of Malta; shot down over Germany on 12 April 1944, aged 26. It was only in 2002 that his remains were found in the wreckage of his plane.
- Dennis Wheatley – the popular historical novelist and thriller writer was granted a commission and brought into Whitehall's World War II Joint Planning Staff.
- Russell Williams – British-born Canadian convicted rapist and murderer and former Colonel in the Canadian Forces
- William, Prince of Wales received the honorary rank of Wing Commander in the RAF in 2023.

== See also ==
- Air force officer rank insignia
- British and U.S. military ranks compared
- Comparative military ranks
- RAF officer ranks
- Ranks of the RAAF
- Wing Commander, a popular computer game series
