= Wildfire at Midnight =

1956 novel by Mary Stewart

- First edition (publ. Hodder & Stoughton); Cover art by Eleanor Poore
- Author: Mary Stewart
- Language: English
- Publication date: 1956

Wildfire at Midnight is a novel by Mary Stewart which was first published in 1956. Stewart herself described the book as "an attempt at something different, the classic closed-room detective story with restricted action, a biggish cast, and a closely circular plot".

== Synopsis ==
Fashion model Gianetta Brooke goes on holiday to the Scottish island of Skye, only to find that her ex-husband, writer Nicholas Drury, is staying at the same hotel in Camasunary. Set against the backdrop of recent events at the time of publication—the coronation of Queen Elizabeth II and the Hillary expedition that was the first to reach the summit of Mount Everest—this romantic suspense novel now has a "bygone era" sense of time and place.

After a murder takes place locally, suspicion falls on the hotel guests, who include an aging "femme-fatale" star stage actress, a mountaineer, a possessive climber and her ingenue apprentice, a jealous wife and philandering husband, an old acquaintance of Gianetta's and Nicholas', a writer of travel guides, and a handsome local versed in pagan folklore. Gianetta, above suspicion due to her more recent arrival at the hotel, finds herself divided when assisting the police, torn between old loyalties, new sympathies, and her civic duty.

== Plot summary ==
In 1953 London top fashion model Gianetta Brooke needs a break and wishes to get away from the crowds for the coronation of Queen Elizabeth II. Gianetta's father, a clergyman interested in religious folklore, suggests a hotel in the Scottish island of Skye. On the ferry to the hotel, Gianetta meets two local mountaineers, Rhodri MacDowell, the ferry operator, and the handsome Roderick Grant, both versed in pagan folklore. They discuss the magnificence of the mountains; when the conversation turns to Blaven, Gianetta senses nobody wants to talk about it.

At the hotel, Gianetta finds she is not the only celebrity; aging theatrical star Marcia Maling provides gossip on the guests. Ronald Beagle, noted mountaineer, keenly follows the progress on the radio of the Hillary expedition to climb Mount Everest. Alma Corrigan is the long-suffering wife of a philandering husband, Hartley Corrigan, who openly flirts with Marcia. The antagonistic Marion Bradford, an obstinate climber possessive of her younger protege, Roberta Symes, scorns advice from more expert climbers. Hubert Hay writes travel guides. Gianetta finds old friend Alastair Braine, on a fishing holiday, unaware she has divorced her husband. To Gianetta's chagrin, her cheating ex-husband, the dashing writer Nicholas Drury, walks in, instantly drawing the interest of most women. Nicholas attempts to talk with her "about us," but Gianetta replies "there is no us" and turns away.

That evening, on a walk with Roderick, Gianetta learns that days before, on Blaven, local Heather Macrae was found ritually murdered, with throat cut, by a bonfire, with jewelry and shoes in a pile by her body. The hotel guests are the main suspects, particularly the men, since Heather had been meeting a secret boyfriend. On her way to her room Gianetta sees Nicholas and Marcia kissing in the hallway.

The next day Marion and Roberta fail to return from an ill-advised climbing excursion by nightfall. A search party finds Marion's body, with the safety rope securing her to a third climber deliberately cut. There is no sign of Roberta. Dougal Macrae (Heather's father) had spotted the women with an unidentified male. Gianetta spots a bonfire on Blaven and sees a dark figure skulking away. Ronald Beale is laid out ritually, like Heather Macrae, with his throat cut. Nicholas is first on the scene in response to her cries for help, but Gianetta is wary. Gianetta and Roderick renew search efforts. They find Roberta, unconscious, in a small cave on a ledge. Realizing that Roberta can name Marion's killer—and likely Heather's and Beale's—Gianetta refuses to leave Roberta's side.

The police question hotel guests and ask Gianetta to spend the night with Roberta, guarded by police. In the library, Gianetta finds a book on folklore, The Golden Bough, with an envelope bookmarking a passage that describes a ritual human sacrifice with a bonfire. The envelope is addressed, in her father's hand, to Nicholas. Someone tries to open the locked door to the bedroom where Gianetta and Roberta are sleeping but retreats when Gianetta calls for help. Marcia finds a doll in her room with lipstick smeared around its throat to simulate a slit throat and leaves the hotel abruptly the next morning. Roberta remains unconscious.

When Nicholas again attempts to speak with Gianetta, she relates her suspicions of him. He asks bitterly why she doesn't turn him in to the police, and she leaves, flustered, with conflicted emotions. Gianetta seeks the protection of Roderick, who reveals himself to be the killer as he chases a fleeing Gianetta up a mountain as he rants insanely against the irreverence of climbers who presume to "conquer" nature. Nicholas arrives on the scene, shoots at Roderick, and saves her. Roderick is apprehended by police.

Nicholas admits her parents colluded in staging a reconciliation. The doll with the mock slit throat had been improvised by Alma Corrigan to scare Marcia away. Nicholas had shown The Golden Bough to the police, and Roderick became the prime suspect. Nicholas had not denied being the killer to Gianetta, jealously and perversely, because he believed she had fallen in love with Roderick and wanted her to sort out her conflicted feelings. They acknowledge their lingering feelings for each other and reconcile.

== Background and analysis ==
The mystery component blends 1953 news events with mountaineering, druid mythology and pagan ritual, along with conflicting views about the conquering of nature: heroic progress or human arrogance? Stewart was familiar with the Isle of Skye, which she had visited with her husband on tours of Scotland.

== Adaptation ==
In 1974, it was adapted by Stewart Hunter as part of the long-running Saturday Night Theatre series on BBC Radio 4. It aired at 20:30 on the 25th of May, 1974, and starred Ursula Smith as Gianetta Brooke and Stephen MacDonald as Roderick Grant.
