= Touch Not the Cat =

1976 novel by Mary Stewart

- First edition
- Author: Mary Stewart
- Language: English
- Publisher: Hodder & Stoughton
- Publication date: 1976
- Publication place: United Kingdom
- Media type: Print
- Pages: 302
- ISBN: 0-340-20157-6

Touch Not the Cat is a novel by Mary Stewart.

== Background ==
Touch Not the Cat was first published in 1976 and is one of Mary Stewart's best-known works. In the United States, Touch Not the Cat was the 9th highest selling book of 1976. Like many of Stewart's novels, the story has a supernatural element.

The title of the book refers to the motto of the clan chief of Clan Chattan, a community of twelve clans including Clan Mackintosh, Clan Macpherson and Clan MacBean. In full this motto is 'Touch not the cat bot [without] a glove'. This is also the motto of the book's fictional Ashley family, from a Scottish ancestor.

Mary Stewart admitted that the vicar in the novel, Mr Bryanston, 'is to some extent a portrait of my own father'. Her father, Frederick Albert Rainbow (1886-1967), was an Anglican vicar in County Durham.

== Settings ==
The story begins in Madeira, where the heroine, Bryony Ashley, is working as a hotel receptionist. Foreshadowing what is to come in the novel, Funchal is described as a sun-drenched town with 'its very pavements made of patterned mosaics'. Bavaria is only very briefly described, in relation to Bryony's father's recuperation from illness and then death there. The main setting is fictional Ashley Court in the Malvern Hills in England. Detailed description is given of the houses and outdoor space that make up the Ashley estate.

== Plot summary ==
Bryony Ashley has the gift of telepathy and is able to communicate subliminally with a man she regards as her lover, but whose identity she is unsure of. She supposes that he is a blood relative because the gift of telepathy runs in the family, and assumes him to be one of her three male second cousins, twins Emory and James, and the younger Francis.

Bryony returns to Bavaria having received a telepathic message and discovers that her father has been hit by a car, and has died after speaking some mysterious phrases, which seem to have some connection with a book in the house's library.

She remains puzzled about the identity of her telepathic contact. Her initial preference is for James, but she gradually realises that the twins are plotting to steal her inheritance, and are willing to murder for it. She learns also that her secret lover is a long-standing friend to whom she had not known she was related, the man-of-all-work around Ashley Court, Rob Granger, whom Bryony grew up with.

Bryony gradually solves her father's puzzles, some of which involve a maze depicted on the family's arms, the motto being "Touch not the cat". In the book's climax, when they learn that she has married Rob, the twins try to murder Bryony and flood the property so they can sell it for redevelopment. She is saved by Rob, with whom she plans to emigrate, and Francis belatedly shows up, the implication being that he will take over the care of Ashley Court.

== Genre ==
Mary Stewart herself described Touch Not the Cat as 'a modern adventure story spiced with romance (or romance spiced with adventure; it depends whether you are advertising it for men or for women)'.

Jenny Brown, founder director and board member of the Edinburgh International Book Festival, interviewed Mary Stewart in 1992 for the STV programme Off the Page, and called her books 'adventure thrillers'.

This novel is also classified as romantic suspense, mystery fiction or Gothic fiction.

Mary Stewart uses Gothic tropes in the novel, including:

- an ancient ancestral home
- missing parish registers and rightful heirs
- twins and cousins
- churchyard scenes and shadowy figures
- storm and flood and darkness and moonlight
- the supernatural

However, Mary Stewart also makes explicit mention of the Gothic conventions, and she is disparaging of them.

- Bryony says: 'A robed figure in a darkened church? Absurd. They had a word for the silly penny-dreadful, didn't they? Gothic, that was it. Robed nuns and ancient houses and secret passages, the paraphernalia that Jane Austen had laughed at in Northanger Abbey'.
- And, from the American tenants of Ashley Court: 'All this time in a moated grange straight out of Tennyson, and not even the sniff of a ghost or a secret passage or any of the things you might expect!' to which Bryony replies that 'there is a secret stair, as a matter of fact; it's a very tame affair but it may have been useful in its day. In a way it's a sort of secret inside a secret – it goes down from the Priest's Hole into the wine-cellars'. Notably, no use is made of these Gothic secret rooms and passages, and there is likewise an insistence that the Court is ghost-free.
- 'too Gothic really'
- 'Gothic trash'
- 'Gothic trash isn't in it'

Nevertheless, a supernatural element remains in the novel: there is telepathy and there is the final scene of the 1835 lovers, who appear to be re-united after death.

== Intertextuality ==
Mary Stewart uses chapter headings in her books that are quotations from literary works. In Touch Not the Cat, these quotes are all from Shakespeare's Romeo and Juliet. Many other literary allusions add depth to the story. These include:

Walter de la Mare - a quote from his poem 'The Riddlers' precedes the story; and the 'lamps of peace' that Bryony refers to in the novel are from his poem 'Trees'.

Thomas Lovell Beddoes - there is a fleeting mention of this poet, when the Ashley Court tour guide states that 'Beddoes mentions this room in one of his poems'. Ashley Court is fictional, the poet is not.

Jane Austen and Northanger Abbey - mentioned in a reference to Gothic fiction.

Arthur Brooke's Romeus and Juliet - the poet's 1562 work that helped inspire Shakespeare's Romeo and Juliet – this work is quoted from and is made part of the plot of the novel. The line 'For lo, an hugy heap of divers thoughts arise' is quoted and Bryony then jokily uses the phrase 'hugy heap'.

Alfred, Lord Tennyson - mentioned by Ashley Court's American tenants (see Genre section above).
