= The Wind Off the Small Isles =

1968 novel by Mary Stewart

First edition (publ. Hodder & Stoughton) Cover art by Lawrence Irving

The Wind Off the Small Isles is a novella by Mary Stewart, first published in 1968. Unlike her other works, it is brief, at only 96 pages in hardcover. It was never published in the United States. Stewart's British publisher, Hodder & Stoughton, reissued it in 2016, for the first time in 40 years.

== Plot summary ==
Perdita works for children's writer Cora Gresham as secretary and personal assistant. Cora is writing about pirates on the Barbary Coast and wants to visit the Canary Islands. After hearing Perdita's description of the various islands, Cora decides on Lanzarote.

Only two days after arriving there, Cora decides she wants to buy a house. While driving around the island they reach Playa Blanca and Cora sees just the house she is looking for. She sends Perdita to ask who owns it. Perdita, after getting no answer at the front door, meets Michael in the grounds who is supervising building work.

There is a mention of Julian Gale from Stewart's earlier novel, This Rough Magic.
