= Nine Coaches Waiting =

1958 novel by Mary Stewart

- First UK edition
- Author: Mary Stewart
- Cover artist: Eleanor Poore
- Language: English
- Genre: Mystery, Romance novel
- Publisher: Hodder & Stoughton
- Publication date: 1 January 1959, copyrighted by the author 1958
- Publication place: United Kingdom
- Media type: Print (Hardcover, Paperback)
- OCLC: 259252977

Nine Coaches Waiting
- First US edition
- Author: Mary Stewart
- Cover artist: [unknown]
- Language: English
- Genre: Mystery, Romance novel
- Publisher: M. S. Mill Company, New York, 1959
- Publication date: 1 January 1959, copyrighted by the author 1958
- Publication place: United States
- Media type: Print (Hardcover, Paperback)
- OCLC: 259252977

Nine Coaches Waiting is a then-contemporary romantic suspense novel by Mary Stewart who became known as "The Queen of Suspense". The novel was copyrighted by the author in 1958 and published on 1 January 1959. The setting is the late 1950s—contemporary to the time of its authorship and first publication.

Nine Coaches Waiting is the tale of a young English governess, Linda Martin, who travels from North London via Paris then Geneva to the remote Château Valmy, beyond Thonon, France, in the French Alps, to take care of nine-year-old Philippe de Valmy. There she finds herself entangled in a murder plot which eventually results in the revelation of a dark secret.

Linda's full given name is Belinda but she uses "Linda for short—or for pretty, [her] mother used to say." Linda is the Spanish word for beautiful or pretty.

In keeping with Linda's background in poetry and other literature, Stewart employs chapter epigraphs with quotes from the works of numerous poets, playwrights, and authors, that fit the themes or actions of each scene. Among these are lines from Macbeth, King John, and Hamlet, by William Shakespeare, as well as from his Sonnets 88 and 90. Others are from John Milton; Charles Dickens; John Keats; Alfred, Lord Tennyson; Elizabeth Barrett Browning; Robert Browning; John Donne; George Villiers, Duke of Buckingham; William Blake; George Meredith; and John Webster. Although there are sometimes two, all epigraphs are much briefer than Thomas Middleton's lines that head the first chapter and from whence Stewart derived the book's title. (See Title under Notes below.)

A good example is the epigraph from King John that introduces Chapter VIII:

Thou art more deep damn'd than Prince Lucifer.
There is none yet so ugly a fiend in hell
As thou shalt be, if thou didst kill this child.

And the final epigraph (at Chapter XXI):

Look you, the stars shine still.

— John Webster, The Duchess of Malfi

Cinderella is referred to by Linda, as is Jane Eyre, for obvious reasons. Mary Stewart's vast literary knowledge and background are particularly, yet seamlessly, manifest in this book.

== Synopsis ==
Linda Martin lands in Paris to take her new post as governess to the 9-year old Philippe, Comte de Valmy. She is feeling uneasy about hiding her past, particularly her French birth and fluency in the French language, from her employers, since Mme. de Valmy had been strangely adamant at her interview about wanting an English governess who would not be tempted to slip into French. Linda, who had been orphaned herself, quickly becomes protective of Philippe, who has also lost both his parents in a tragic accident.

Philippe lives with his aunt and uncle in the vast and ornate Château Valmy in the alpine French countryside not far from Geneva, Switzerland. Léon de Valmy, Philippe's uncle, runs the estate on behalf of his under-age nephew until the boy inherits in 6 years.

When Linda arrives at the eighteenth-century château—described as a mansion with its "four-square classic grace" that makes it less than a romantic castle with turrets and pinnacles but more than a country house—she is enchanted by its beauty and history, but is also struck by the sense of menace surrounding its inhabitants. Léon is a character who Linda begins to suspect may have plans to take over both the title and the chateau. When Linda meets his son Raoul, she learns more about the de Valmy heritage and wonders to what extent he is involved in the threat to Philippe. As she becomes closer to Philippe and Raoul, Linda draws nearer to identifying the source of the threat, and suspects the "English governess" who supposedly does not speak fluent French is being set up as the scapegoat to a plot. She feels she may not be able to trust those she wants to, no matter how innocent or attractive they may seem. The governess must then try to save Philippe's life as well as her own.

== Characters ==
- Linda Martin: The 23-year-old English governess who arrives at the Château Valmy to take care of young Philippe and further his education in English by only speaking to him in that language. At the age of 14, Linda's English father and French mother died in a plane crash out of Paris where Linda was raised, and she spent the next 7 years in a North London orphanage, then 3 years working as a general helper at a boy's prep school in Kent. As a consequence, she understands loneliness, living with it as a constant since her parents' deaths. Brown-haired and gray-eyed, fluent in both English and French, Linda conceals her French background and history because she needs and wants the job badly, and it seems so important to Héloïse de Valmy, interviewing her in London, that she be an "English girl." Lovely without being aware of it, humble and dependable with a good deal of common sense despite having a romantic imagination, Linda is the protagonist and the narrator. Linda's father was a poet and writer who had "made poetry a habit" with her and taught her that "poetry was awfully good material to think with." In spite of her relative lack of education, she is intelligent with a retentive memory and a large store of remembered literary lines and verses that come back to her at various, often opportune, times. When the famous French fashion designer Florimond visits the Valmys, Linda is comfortable with his "clever oversophisticated chatter" which reminds her of her father's "drink-and-verses jamborees" that she'd been allowed to attend as a young teen before her parents were killed. At the same time, Linda is also compassionate and able to tease Philippe playfully and relate to him on his level, not only as a preceptress but also as a friend—the only one he has. She quickly becomes very fond of him, and protective in whatever way he needs it, looking after him beyond the line of duty.
- Léon de Valmy: called The Master by those in his employ, Léon is the mysterious and seemingly cynical trustee of the opulent eighteenth-century Château Valmy and the extensive Valmy estate, managing it in an obsessive way, ostensibly for his nephew Philippe until the boy inherits at the age of fifteen. He uses a noiseless motorized wheelchair, having lost the use of his legs when he broke his back in a polo accident twelve years before. He had managed Valmy for his brother Étienne, the Comte de Valmy, from the time of their father's death because Étienne preferred to live in Paris. A "big, handsome, powerful man" who is "damnably attractive" with a considerable charm of manner when he chooses to use it, Léon sees himself as Milton's "thunder-scarred angel" Lucifer after the fall, in reference to his crippled state—and, it appears, in other ways as well. He always had to do everything and do it better than anyone else, as if a devil were driving him. If a fallen angel, he must needs be an archangel (the "Demon King"). Black-browed and black-eyed with now-white hair, he's known to be a superior landlord with an overwhelming personality and is well-respected by the denizens of the Merlon River valley. He is able to navigate his wheelchair through the Valmy château (using the lift installed in the library), and through the formal gardens, but not through Valmy's steep woods. He uses Bernard for that. Cradled in the great pine forests of the region and reached from the valley via a charming centuries-old stone bridge over the river and a sharp zig-zag upwards through the trees, Château Valmy includes vast lands covered with timber, one of the chief sources of income for the mountainside estate.
- Héloïse de Valmy: Léon's second wife, whom he married 16 years before. Slender and elegant with well-coiffed silver hair, she has the kind of beauty that largely outlasts aging, but she is frail and suffers from a heart condition, insomnia, and depression. To most, she is cool and remote in manner. Though much overshadowed by her husband, she is devoted to him—and to no one else.
- Philippe de Valmy: Nine-year-old Philippe is a quiet, lonely little boy. With the typical Valmy coloring of black hair and black eyes, he is pale, thin and small for his age. Intelligent but subdued, he seems unlikely to chatter and is very self-controlled, only partly due to breeding. Philippe inherited the Château Valmy and its surrounding estate along with the title of Comte de Valmy (Count of Valmy) and the Paris house at the death of his mother and his father Étienne, the oldest of the three Valmy brothers, in a plane crash the year before (the same fate as Linda's parents). His inheritance won't be officially turned over to him for another six years. Till then he has two trustees: his Uncle Léon for the Valmy estate and his Uncle Hippolyte for the boy himself. Philippe was raised in Paris, but when orphaned, lived at the Villa Mireille with his Uncle Hippolyte of whom he is very fond. Several months ago, Hippolyte's vocation took him on a scheduled lecture tour to Greece, at which time Philippe went to live at the Château Valmy with his Uncle Léon and Aunt Héloïse. His French nanny, who came with him, was dismissed, and an English governess (Linda) sought in London. Philippe takes to Linda quickly and it soon becomes apparent that Philippe "is better for having Linda there."
- Raoul de Valmy: Léon's 30-year-old son, who is sophisticated, impulsive and something of an adventurer. Fluent in English as well as French, he has managed Bellevigne, his father's estate in Provence with its income deriving from vineyards, since he was 19—an uphill battle since his father takes funds from that estate to spend on Valmy and Raoul, whose heritage Bellevigne is as well, must continually fight him on that issue. Raoul, whose English mother (Deborah) died when he was 8, was a quiet, lonely little boy much like Philippe. He was raised at the Château Valmy (primarily by French nurses as a child) in the same rooms that had housed his father and uncles as children, and now are the abode of Philippe. When Raoul was 14, his father remarried but Héloïse was never a mother to him. For quite some time, Raoul has lived most of the year between Bellevigne and Paris. In appearance, Raoul could be a duplicate of what Léon must have been thirty years ago—"tall, dark and handsome." His personality makes "as strong an impact" as his father's and he also can be very charming. Raoul is the only person who has ever stood up to his father or got the better of Léon in an encounter. However, unlike Léon's, Raoul's voice holds an "undertone of laughter that [is] unmistakably his." Raoul is a bit wild and always the subject of gossip, though nothing like his father and uncle Étienne were at the same age. Raoul has never known the type of carefree life they had lived. The Château Valmy is "a big place to be alone in" and "was never a house for children" in Raoul's experience, and he has sought "anodynes to loneliness" in ways different than Linda has, only in part because he's led a life of wealth and privilege. The loving home Linda was raised in is nothing like the one he knew.
- Hippolyte de Valmy: Léon's kindly younger brother, who is an archaeologist of some repute. He inherited the Villa Mireille, a mansion with a fairly large property at the edge of Lac Léman (French name for Lake Geneva, forty percent of which is in France) among similar properties lining the lake, a few kilometers below the Valmy estate and situated outside Thonon-les-Bains—briefly Thonon. Rather unpredictable, according to his brother Léon, Hippolyte has generally been away on expeditions or lecture tours. Whereas Léon was made trustee over Valmy, Hippolyte is the trustee of Philippe who has lived with him at the Villa Mireille since the boy's parents were killed. An engagement recently took him to Greece on a lecture tour, scheduled to last until the coming Easter, after which his plans include an excavation near Delphi for some months. The Villa Mireille has been shut up until his return. Linda views Hippolyte as her deus ex machina, to whom, when he returns home "fly[ing] in out of the clouds," she will be able to turn Philippe over with complete confidence for the boy's care and safety, and who will also be able to deal with the Valmy crisis.
- William Blake: A good-hearted, shy Englishman in his twenties who is a university-educated forester at Dieudonné, the estate across the Merlon River from the Valmy estate, and the only adult Linda trusts with certainty, partly because he has absolutely no connection to the Valmys and has a life completely separate from them. Huge and blond, with a bit of a "stick-in-the-mud disposition," William speaks almost no French, but likes living in the area while he researches conifer diseases for an advanced degree in forestry—a subject on which he can wax enthusiastic. Much of his time is spent in a chalet-style log hut high up in the Dieudonné woods (his light seen like a star from the Château Valmy on the nights when he's there). Sometimes he sleeps at the Coq Hardi in Soubirous, the village in the Merlon River valley, where some English is spoken and he can get a good meal. He also does some climbing with friends in the region, on occasion. Whenever he meets someone from England, he dreads the all-too-frequent comment his name William Blake produces—"Little lamb, who made thee"—from Songs of Innocence by the English poet William Blake, and he's grateful when Linda doesn't bring it up although she does guess which line he finds trying. Linda confesses she prefers tigers herself, an allusion to The Tyger from the same poet's Songs of Experience (a companion of opposites to The Lamb), an allusion that both characters understand. Her comment prompts him afterward to tell her to "chase [her] tigers" saying she's already found one—in Léon de Valmy. Why? Because he is "fierce and incalculable by reputation." The next time she runs into William, Linda thinks of him as "the one English lamb in my pride of French tigers" but doesn't say so. William is Linda's first, and then back up, plan when crisis comes.
- Bernard: Léon de Valmy's caretaker and right-hand man who has been in Léon's employ for 20 years, and would do pretty much anything for him. He serves Léon in a broad range of capacities, including as a chauffeur when needed. He and his sister Albertine have dark hair and dark-visaged Savoyard features and complexions. He looks as though he never smiles.
- Albertine: Héloïse de Valmy's maid and sister to Bernard. Around 45 years old and sallow-faced, she is unfriendly, sour to anyone except Héloïse (and, of course, her brother Bernard), and dislikes Linda. Both Bernard and Albertine are described as secretive, but they are ever-ready to spread rumors.
- Berthe: The pretty young maid of the nursery/schoolroom area at the Château Valmy, who bonds with Linda. Berthe's family lives in the village and two of her brothers work on the Valmy estate. She and Bernard, Léon's caretaker, plan to marry.
- Mrs. Seddon: Mary Seddon, the English housekeeper at the Château Valmy. She and her husband Arthur came to Valmy 32 years ago with Léon's first wife Deborah (Raoul's mother) from Northumberland, England, out of dedication to her. (Deborah was "a lovely girl" who met Léon in Paris one spring and became engaged to him in two weeks.) Mrs. Seddon speaks French with a very bad accent and is plagued by asthma, but is good-natured and a source of information (via gossip) for Linda. She and her husband are fond of Philippe, have his welfare sincerely to heart, and are very pleased Linda has come.
- Seddon: Arthur Seddon, the English butler at the Château Valmy, husband of Mrs. Seddon.
- Florimond: (Carlo Florimond) Famous French fashion designer of women's clothing and friend of the Valmys. He designs clothing for Héloïse and a great many other wealthy upper-class French women and is naturally known in London, as well. Florimond likes "tobacco and chess judiciously mixed," is kind to Philippe, and befriends Linda as well. He knew Philippe in Paris when he visited Philippe's parents in the years before they were killed.

== Notes ==
The novel is divided into nine parts or Nine Coaches. The nine coaches also refer to the nine vehicles that Linda rides in during the book's action. The first and second coaches are the two different taxis she takes when in Paris (Chapter I), the third is the Valmy-owned "big black Daimler" ( c. 1952; e.g., pre 1950) from Geneva, the nearest airport, to the Château Valmy in the High Savoy in the French Alps, chauffeured by Léon de Valmy's man Bernard (Chapter II), etc. The author only counts a vehicle as a coach if we are privy to Linda's thoughts as she's riding in it, no matter how brief the ride, such as that in the "battered Renault" in Chapter XVI that begins the Seventh Coach. We don't, for instance, count a bus ride as one of the coaches if we only know during the action that she had ridden the bus that morning.

The title 'Nine Coaches Waiting' is derived from the play The Revenger's Tragedy attributed to Thomas Middleton:

Oh, think upon the pleasure of the palace:
Secured ease and state, the stirring meats,
Ready to move out of the dishes,
That e'en now quicken when they're eaten,
Banquets abroad by torch-light, musics, sports,
Bare-headed vassals that had ne'er the fortune
To keep on their own hats but let horns [wear] 'em,
Nine coaches waiting. Hurry, hurry, hurry!
Ay, to the devil.

Used by Mary Stewart as follows on page 1 (as the first epigraph, and incorporated, in part, into the first chapter):

Oh, think upon the pleasure of the palace:
Securèd ease and state! The stirring meats,
Ready to move out of the dishes, that e'en now
Quicken when they are eaten....
Banquets abroad by torch-light! music! sports!
Nine coaches waiting—hurry, hurry, hurry—
Ay, to the devil....

Perhaps the name of the third brother Hippolyte de Valmy in the book was suggested by the character Hippolito (the brother of the avenger Vendice). The title of the book as well as that of the nine parts as Coaches keeps in the reader's mind the connection of the action to both the title and the first epigraph. It is much more significant than the clever connection to vehicles.

When she first arrives in France to take up her position as governess, Linda, in a taxi hurrying from the airport through the streets of Paris, suddenly recalls most of these lines sparked by the word Hurry, thinking: "...some tempter's list of pleasures, it had been, designed to lure a lonely young female to a luxurious doom; yes, that was it. Vendice enticing the pure and idiotic Castiza to the Duke's bed ....(Ay, to the devil)....I grinned to myself as I placed it. Inappropriate, certainly. This particular young female was heading, I hoped, neither to luxury nor to the devil, but merely to a new setting for the same old job she abandoned in England." However, not many days later, ensconced at the luxurious Château Valmy, she finds herself privately referring to her employer Léon de Valmy as "the Demon King" and the half-remembered verses turn out to be more à propos than she'd thought when she finally pieces together the murder plot and the rôle assigned to her before she ever left England.
