= My Brother Michael =

1959 novel by Mary Stewart

- First edition (publ. Hodder & Stoughton); Cover art by Val Biro
- Author: Mary Stewart
- Language: English
- Publication date: 1959

My Brother Michael is a novel by Mary Stewart, first published in 1959. It ranked number 55 in the UK Crime Writer’s Association’s The Top 100 Crime Novels of All Time, published in 1990.

The Good Reads synopsis states, "...Camilla's life suddenly begins to take off when she sets out on a mysterious car journey to Delphi in the company of a charming but quietly determined Englishman named Simon Lester. Simon told Camilla he had come to the ancient Greek ruins to 'appease the shade' of his brother Michael, killed some fourteen years earlier on Parnassus. From a curious letter Michael had written, Simon believed his brother had stumbled upon something of great importance hidden in the craggy reaches of the mountainside. And then Simon and Camilla learned that they were not alone in their search..."

== Plot summary ==
Set in Greece, 14 years after the German occupation during World War II, British tourist Camilla Haven has recently broken her engagement and is holidaying on her own. Sitting in an Athens cafe writing to her friend, Elizabeth, Camila laments “nothing exciting ever happens to me”, when a man appears with a message about a hired car for Delphi. Camilla hasn't requested it, but no one else claims the car. She wants to visit Delphi but is doubtful about affording it. She is told it is a matter of "life and death", that the woman who hired the car for “Monsieur Simon” was to wait at the cafe, and that the deposit has been paid. After the man leaves the car keys through a misunderstanding, Camilla finds the serendipity of the situation and the temptation to take the car irresistible. Under the pretext of finding out who “Simon” is who needs the car so urgently, she leaves her contact information with the café's proprietor and sets out to drive the car herself to Delphi.

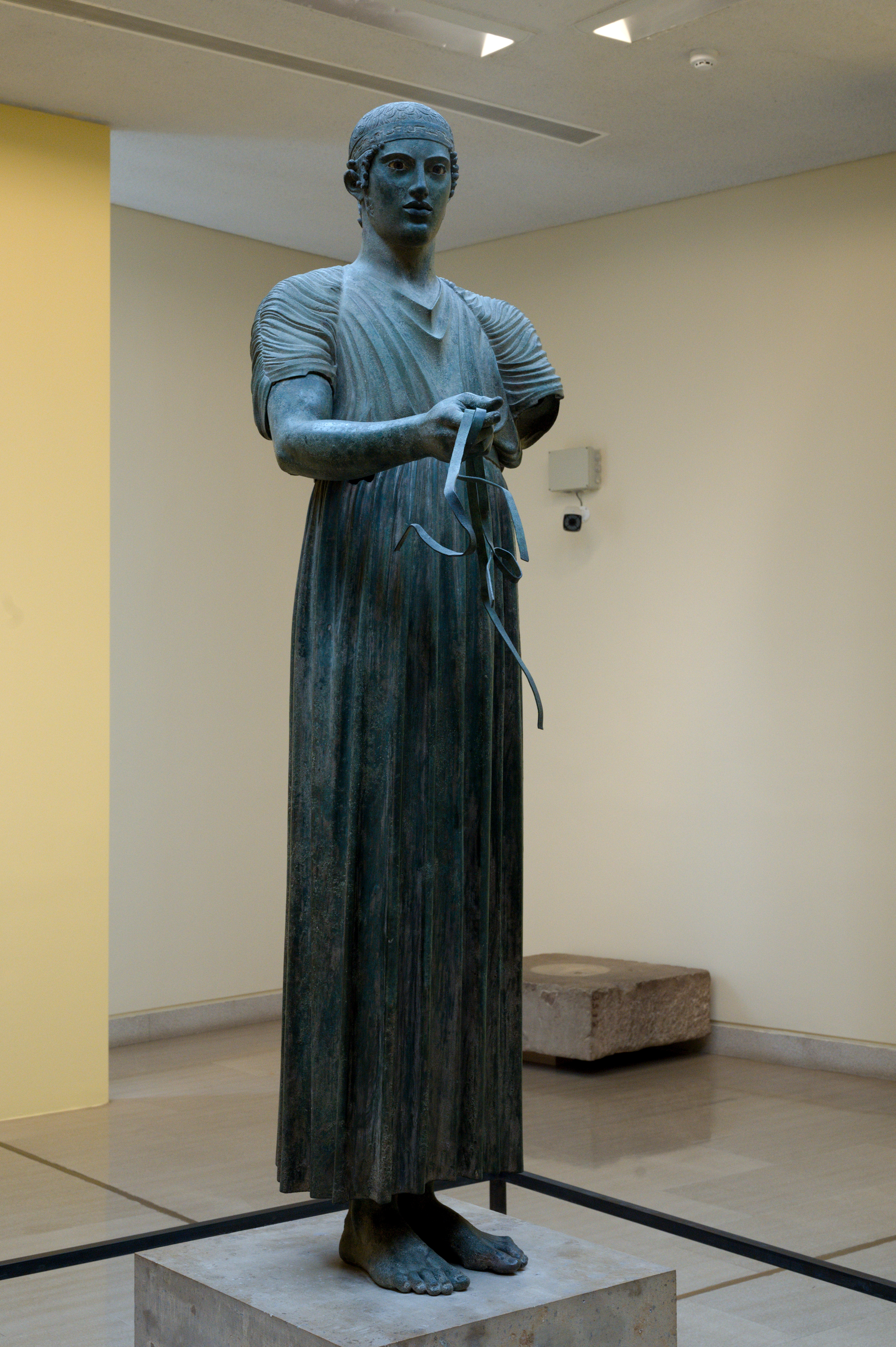
The Charioteer, a famous bronze statue in the Delphi Museum.

On the way Camilla meets Simon Lester, in Greece on a pilgrimage to Delphi to learn more about the death of his brother, Michael, during the war. Simon had been 15 in the UK in 1944; Michael Lester, 10 years older, had been a British Liaison Officer to the Greek partisan group ELAS. Michael’s last letter home, found by Simon when going through his deceased father's papers, hinted at a significant discovery on Parnassus. Following cryptic clues in Michael's last letter, Simon is determined to find out what discovery Michael made that had him so excited.

No one in Delphi knows of a “Simon” who ordered a car, and Camilla observes the wariness with which the local men watch Simon Lester as he makes inquiries. Simon denies any knowledge of the car but helps Camilla with her predicament; in turn she joins him in his quest.

Antagonists involved in theft, smuggling, and murder during the German occupation resurface. Camilla becomes involved in uncovering the circumstances of Michael Lester's death, which comes to threaten both her and Simon.

A member of the Special Air Service (SAS) in German-occupied Greece, Michael was doing undercover work with the resistance for 18 months before he was killed. The British were flying in arms and gold for use by the andartes. In 1944, after the Germans left, resistance guerrilla groups turned on each other. A band led by Angelos Dragoumis plundered arms, cash, and gold, stashing the loot for retrieval after the war. Dragoumis fled to Yugoslavia to avoid reprisals for his traitorous actions. Simon learns from Michael’s wartime ally, Stephanos, that Dragoumis ambushed and killed Michael. As reported by Stephanos, Michael’s last words, attempting to convey a message, was “The Charioteer”.

After serving time in a Yugoslav prison for a political murder, Dragoumis returns to retrieve his loot, but a series of earthquake shocks after the war extensively changed the shapes and landmarks on Parnassus, honeycombed with caves. Only Stephanos, a local, can identify the spot where Michael was ambushed, near the cache of loot, and Stephanos will only take Michael’s brother, on pilgrimage, to the spot.

The woman who hired the car turns out to be Danielle Lascaux, former mistress of a French archeologist, who used Simon’s name to hire the car in Athens without his knowledge. Danielle is involved with Dragoumis, keeping an eye on Simon, the key to finding the cave that holds the loot. Danielle becomes a collateral victim of Dragoumis’s sadistic tendencies, along with Nigel Barrow, a promising young artist who unwittingly beats Dragoumis and Simon to the archaeological find.

As Simon and Camilla deal with Dragoumis and his cohorts, they discover the archeological treasure that Michael did not live to disclose: an Apollo statue, possibly the god driven by the famous Charioteer of Delphi. The Apollo statue had remained hidden for two thousand years, hidden in a cave shrine by priests from ancient plunderers of Delphi to be retrieved in less troubled times.

== See also ==
- The Top 100 Crime Novels of All Time
