= A Walk in Wolf Wood =

1980 children's novel by Mary Stewart

- First UK edition
- Author: Mary Stewart
- Illustrator: Emanuel Schongut
- Language: English
- Genre: Fantasy; Werewolf fiction
- Publisher: Hodder & Stoughton (UK); William Morrow and Company (US)
- Publication date: 1980
- Publication place: United Kingdom
- Media type: Print
- Pages: 148
- ISBN: 0-340-25291-X
- OCLC: 6194375
- LC Class: PZ7.S8495 Wal 1980 FT MEADE

A Walk in Wolf Wood: A Tale of Fantasy and Magic is an English children's fantasy novel written by Mary Stewart, and published in 1980. Stewart tells the story of a sister and brother from 20th-century England who end up in 14th-century Germany to rescue a kindhearted werewolf.

A Walk in Wolf Wood is Mary Stewart's 18th novel, and her third children's novel. In 1996, Stewart was awarded the Malice Domestic Award for Lifetime Achievement.

== Plot summary ==
John and Margaret Begbie are two adolescent siblings from England vacationing in Germany with their parents. While resting at the edge of an area of the Black Forest, which is named Wolfenwald ("Wolf Wood"), they suddenly see a strange man dressed in archaic garments running past them, weeping. Curious, and with their parents sleeping, they follow him and soon come upon a gold medal they saw around the stranger's neck and which he lost in his flight. Then they follow his trail to an ancient, derelict cottage in the forest, where they find the stranger's clothes under the bed. Dusk suddenly falls, and the two children are menaced by a huge wolf appearing at the hut. John chases it away by hurling the medal at him, and he and Margaret run back to their campsite, only to find their parents and the car mysteriously gone.

After settling down for the night, in the hopes their parents will return soon, they are woken at dawn by the re-appearance of the wolf being chased by a medieval-looking hunting party. After Margaret sends them the wrong way, and noting more and more features in the surrounding area changing gradually, the children begin to believe that they have been caught in some sort of weird dream. Lacking an alternative, they return to the cottage, where they are surprised to find it inhabited by the weeping stranger. The latter introduces himself as Mardian, a courtier and close friend to one Duke Otho, the ruler of these parts, and explains that he is the wolf the children have encountered. Five years previously, Duke Otho was wounded in battle and since then rendered unable to walk, even though by all rights he should have fully recovered. Otho became bitter towards Mardian, who had to stand in for him since that time, a sentiment which attracted Almeric, an evil, ambitious nobleman and enchanter at Otho's court. Lusting after the Duke's wealth and lands, he tried to gain Mardian's aid in his schemes, but failed. After unsuccessfully attempting to assassinate him, Almeric used his knowledge of the black arts to curse Mardian into becoming a wolf every night and to turn himself into Mardian's doppelgänger. Mardian suspects that Almeric will soon murder Otho (whom he has been slowly poisoning) and the Duke's son, Crispin, to assume the Duke's title for himself, and that John and Margaret were transported into his era by the power of trust and fidelity between Mardian and Otho, symbolized by the near-identical amulets they are wearing, in order to set things right.

After hearing this story, John and Margaret pledge themselves to Mardian's cause. After being given clothes matching this era and getting explained how to help him, the children lock themselves away while Mardian turns into his wolf form upon nightfall. After sating his animalistic bloodthirst on a kill in the forest, Mardian leads John and Margaret to the Duke's still-ruined castle and into a secret room only he and Otho knew about, before leaving them with his amulet and with a previously arranged promise to return the following night. The next morning, the magic transition is complete, and John and Margaret emerge into a castle bustling with medieval life. While John ends up as one of the pages serving the castle's inhabitants, Margaret is put into the castle's nursery. In the gardens, she incidentally overhears a conversation between Almeric and Crispin, who is suspecting that his father's unnatural illness must be linked to the wolf (Mardian) he's been hunting. After nearly being recognized by a lady at court who was part of the hunting party, Margaret confines herself to the secret room.

The same evening, Hans encounters Justin, Duke Otho's personal page who has been roughed up by his jealous peers. Seizing his chance, John trades clothes with Justin to bring Mardian's amulet to the Duke. At first he tries to do so surreptitiously, but is found out. After he manages to present the amulet and Mardian's tale to the Duke, Otho snaps out of his poison-induced daze and takes charge to arrest Almeric for his treachery. However, in the meantime Almeric comes to the secret room (which he somehow found out about and which he has been using as his secret laboratory), captures Margaret and discovers her connection with Mardian. When the werewolf returns, Almeric takes Margaret hostage, but John and Duke Otho's arrival foils his attempt to leave Mardian to be slain by the castle guards.

Otho has the wolf and Almeric brought to the surface, where with the sunrise Mardian is turned back to his human self. Almeric is accidentally exposed to the magic powder he used to curse Mardian, is turned into a werewolf himself and flees. With Almeric's poisons fading, the Duke regains his ability to walk and joyfully reunites with Mardian. After a celebration and a farewell to Mardian, John and Margaret leave the castle and abruptly find themselves back in their own time, just as their parents are packing up to continue the trip.

== Publications ==
Internationally, the book was published in German in 1981 under the title Geistermond über dem Wolfswald ("Ghost Moon Above Wolf Wood"). This version features a slightly revised ending in which Almeric is killed by Crispin's hunters right after fleeing the castle in wolf form.
