= The Ivy Tree =

1961 novel by Mary Stewart

First edition (UK)

The Ivy Tree is a novel of romantic suspense by English author Mary Stewart. Her sixth novel, it was published in 1961 in Britain by Hodder & Stoughton and in 1962 in the United States by William Morrow. As usual with the author, the novel is narrated in first person by a bold and intelligent young woman, and the setting is picturesque—in this case, Northumberland.

== Plot ==
Narrator/protagonist Mary Grey, who has come from Canada to the land of her forebearers, leans against Hadrian's Wall, near a cliff, when Connor Winslow hostilely accuses her of being his long-lost (second) cousin "Annabel". Uneasily aware the cliff’s edge, Mary persuades him, with difficulty, that she is not his prodigal relative. Astonished at her resemblance, Connor sees an opportunity.

Days later Connor offers Mary money to impersonate Annabel Winslow at Whitescar, the Northumberland family farm that Connor manages (nod to Josephine Tey’s Brat Farrar). Despite running off to the States 8 years earlier and cutting off ties to the family, Annabel remains heir to her grandfather’s estate. Connor wants Mary to “reestablish” herself with Annabel’s ailing grandfather, Matthew Winslow, inherit his estate, and then transfer it to him. Mary agrees, is coached in the impersonation, and succeeds in convincing the household that she is Annabel.

The impersonation has two weaknesses. One is Mary's fear of horses, which contradicts Annabel's natural horsemanship. The second is Connor’s unawareness of the adulterous relationship between Annabel and Adam Forrest, owner of neighboring Forrest Hall. Forrest’s intimacy with Annabel now poses a threat to the impersonation.

Annabel’s younger cousin, Julie, 11 years old at the time of Annabel’s departure, reveals that she knew of Annabel and Adam’s letter exchanges in the hollow of an old ivy tree. Adam is now a widower, whose hand has been disfigured in saving his invalid wife’s life in the fire that destroyed Forrest Hall (an echo of Charlotte Bronte’s Jane Eyre). Mary braces to control the inevitably awkward first encounter with Adam. Anticipating that Adam will be drawn to the rendezvous spot upon learning of Annabel’s return, she makes a late night visit to the ivy tree. Staying in the shadows, she tells Adam resolutely that their relationship is years dead. Adam persists in asking for a second chance. He draws her into the light and declares that she has changed too much to be Annabel, but his attraction to her is apparent. Exploiting his ambivalence, Mary persuades him to keep her identity secret as long as no one is hurt.

Seeing Mary’s genuine grief at Matthew Winslow’s deathbed, Connor again becomes suspicious, but Mary again manages to reassure him.

In a plot twist, the reader learns that Mary Grey is indeed Annabel Winslow. Annabel has seen a chance in Connor’s confusion to go back to Whitescar to visit her dying grandfather safe from Connor’s menace. The night of her departure had been doubly traumatic. Annabel had been emotionally devastated when Adam rejected her ultimatum, insisting he could not abandon his invalid wife. Following this drama, Connor had urged a marriage that would give him future control of Whitescar. When she had rejected Connor emphatically, Connor had turned menacing, nearly pushing her off a cliff.

Adam discovers her skillfully riding a difficult horse, and tells her he knows she is Annabel. They discuss Annabel’s motives for leaving and admit their lingering love.

Through Julie’s embarrassed recollection, they learn that the Ivy tree, fatefully, still holds the letter that Annabel wrote to Adam weeks after her departure. Before leaving for the Americas, Annabel had mailed a letter to Adam urging him to run off with her. The postman had improperly given the letter to Julie, who had placed the letter in the hollow of the ivy tree, where she had seen the two lovers leave messages. Adam had not looked there for a letter weeks after Annabel’s departure. (The symbolism of the ivy tree, delaying their improper union until a more honorable time, again echoes the relationship of Jane Eyre and Edward Rochester.)

At the climax, Annabel gives herself away to Connor when Adam is trapped in a cave-in of an old cellar, and she must ride the spirited horse to seek help. Connor confronts her angrily in the stable and attempts to kill her. His violent actions spook the horse, who bucks and tramples him to death. Annabel and Adam are finally united.

== Characters ==
Mary Grey, protagonist: a new arrival in England from Canada, working in the Kasbah cafe in Newcastle and renting an old run-down flat. Her alternate identity (later confirmed to the reader) is Annabel Winslow: the well-liked but wayward favorite of her grandfather, Matthew (see below). When she successfully convinces him that he is mistaken when accusing her of being Annabel, she sees a chance to return home and see her dying grandfather without risking Connor’s murderous wrath.

Connor Winslow, the handsome but hot-tempered and ruthless manager of Whitescar Farm. Connor schemes to marry second-cousin Annabel Winslow to get control of her grandfather’s estate. Eight years after Annabel’s disappearance, he plots an impersonation to get Annabel’s inheritance

Lisa Dermott, Connor's half-sister, loyal only to her brother and anxious that he become the Farm's heir.

Matthew Winslow, the elderly patriarch of Whitescar: the grandfather of Annabel and Julie and great-uncle to Connor. Although a stroke has weakened him and death is imminent, Matthew continues to control his household and enjoys keeping everyone in suspense regarding his final wishes to his heirs.

Julie Winslow is the pretty, vivacious young cousin of Annabel. Julie adores Annabel and freely confides about her feelings concerning Whitescar, her boyfriend Donald, and her knowledge of the affair between Annabel and Adam. When Connor threatens Julie, Annabel and Adam rescue her.

Archaeologist Donald Seton, Julie's boyfriend, is captivated with his work on Roman excavations, and his proportionate lack of attention towards Julie induces her to doubt if she and Donald will ever marry. When he almost dies in a cave-in on Forrest Hall property, his survival draws them closer.

Adam Forrest, owner of Forrest Hall, is a neighbor of the Winslow family, and sometime the paramour of Annabel, even during his wife's lifetime. His invalid wife has died in the interim years. When he learns of Annabel’s return to the neighborhood, he is eager to reestablish their relationship, but is initially discouraged by Annabel, partially over bitterness and partially to hide her double impersonation from Connor. Adam eventually sees through Annabel’s ruse, and they reconcile. At the end of the story, he is identified with the Biblical Adam.

== Reviews ==
Mary Stewart was already a popular author of romantic suspense and most reviewers felt that this novel was up to her standards. The Atlantic Monthly said, "The author has a neat touch with red herrings and cambric-tea romances." The Christian Science Monitor said: "If the reader feels cheated by the denouement, the author has earned forgiveness by her exciting, belief-suspending account of Mary Grey's sensitive groping for the right response to those who are more sure than the reader that they have known her all her life." The eminent mystery-novel critic Anthony Boucher said, "No one writes the damsel in distress tale with greater charm or urgency."

Jo Walton, in a conflicted but mostly negative critique ("It's very clever indeed, too clever for its own good. ... It's a load of nonsense, really"), compares and contrasts the novel with Josephine Tey's Brat Farrar, which "Stewart clearly has read and been influenced by". Martin Edwards observes more neutrally that the "fraud in Brat Farrar is discussed and emulated in Mary Stewart's The Ivy Tree" in a section on the "Prodigal Son/Daughter" theme in the encyclopedia Whodunit? (2003).
