= Airs Above the Ground (novel) =

1965 novel by Mary Stewart

- First edition (publ. Hodder & Stoughton)
- Author: Mary Stewart
- Publisher: M. S. Mill Co.
- Publication date: January 1, 1965
- ISBN: 978-0-688-01037-9

Airs Above the Ground is a 1965 novel by Mary Stewart. The title derives from Classical dressage, in particular, the graceful Airs Above the Ground, the haute ecole movements for which special breeds of horses, in particular Lippizans, are highly trained. These trained moves were once used by the horse to aid mounted soldiers in battle.

== Plot introduction ==
Mary Stewart is known for raising the genre of romantic suspense novels to a higher and more educated level with a new kind (for the time) of intelligent heroine. Airs Above the Ground is a romantic murder mystery which takes place in Austria. Central to the story is a horse from the Spanish Riding School of Vienna, which the author wrote with the permission of the Director, Colonel Alois Podhajsky, for not only the use of the school, but of himself in the story. The story evokes the vivid and accurate sense of location, for which the author is well-known and beloved. The author, in an interview years later, tells of hearing the story of a horse who was tethered in a field, and the horse, upon hearing a song on a nearby car radio, started all on its own to do a dance it must have been trained for. This haunting story was the seed around which this novel was built.

== Plot summary ==
Vanessa March is married to Lewis, who works for the Sales Department of Pan-European Chemicals.

Having tea with her mother's schoolfriend Carmel Lacy at Harrods, she learns that Lewis, whom she believes to be in Stockholm on business, appears in a newsreel story about a circus fire in Austria. Carmel, assuming Vanessa will be joining Lewis in Austria, asks her to accompany her seventeen-year-old son Timothy, who wants to visit his divorced father in Vienna.

Seeing the newsreel for herself, Vanessa sees Lewis in Austria — with his arm around a blonde girl. When she receives a message from Lewis postmarked Stockholm, Vanessa immediately agrees to travel to Austria, unaware that by doing so she is endangering her husband and herself.

The story is set against a backdrop of circus life, stolen goods, international smuggling, and an old mystery involving the disappearance of a famed Lipizzaner stallion and his groom.
