= Thornyhold =

1988 fantasy novel by Mary Stewart

- Author: Mary Stewart
- Cover artist: Gavin Rowe
- Language: English
- Genre: Fantasy novel
- Publisher: Hodder & Stoughton
- Publication date: 1988
- Publication place: United Kingdom
- Pages: 224
- ISBN: 0-340-41519-3

Thornyhold is a fantasy novel by Mary Stewart published in 1988.

== Summary ==
The story is about a lonely child, Geillis "Gilly" Ramsey, who is made to see the world through her mother's cousin's (also Geillis — Gilly was named after her) unusual eyes. When the child becomes a young woman, she inherits her dead cousin's house as well as her reputation among the local community as a white witch and herbalist. However, as she finds out, this is no normal community, and worries quickly present themselves. Magical effort is pointed at the attractive and widowed popular writer, Christopher Dryden, who lives in rural isolation with his young son.

As Christopher Dryden points out to Gilly, her (and her mother's cousin's) name is that of a real witch, Geillis Duncane, who was tried in Edinburgh in the late 16th century during the North Berwick witch trials. Gilly's rival for the affections of Dryden, Agnes Sampson, shares a name with another woman tried at North Berwick.
