= Frederick Stewart (geologist) =

Scottish geologist and academic

Sir Frederick Stewart FRS FRSE FGS
- Born: Frederick Henry Stewart; 16 January 1916; Aberdeen, Scotland
- Died: 9 December 2001 (aged 85)
- Occupation: Geologist
- Spouse: Mary Stewart (m. 1945)
- Awards: FRS (1964)

Sir Frederick Henry Stewart FRS FRSE FGS (16 January 1916 – 9 December 2001) was a Scottish geologist and academic who was a professor at the University of Edinburgh.

== Background ==
Stewart was born in Aberdeen on 16 January 1916, the son of Frederick Robert Stewart, a lecturer in engineering at Aberdeen University, and his wife, Hester Alexander.

He was educated at Fettes College and Robert Gordon's College. He earned a BSc in Zoology at Aberdeen University. He followed this with a doctorate (PhD) in Geology at Emmanuel College, Cambridge, while studying the geology of the Isle of Skye and the village of Belhelvie, Aberdeenshire.

== Personal life ==
In 1945, Stewart married Mary Rainbow, (later to achieve recognition as the novelist Mary Stewart) whom he met whilst working in Durham. She lived longer than him, dying in 2014. There were no children.

== Honours and awards ==
- Honorary doctorates from the Universities of Aberdeen, Leicester, Heriot-Watt University, Durham, and Glasgow.
- Fellow of the Royal Society of Edinburgh, 1957
- Elected a Fellow of the Royal Society (FRS) in 1964
- Awarded the Lyell Medal by the Geological Society of London, 1970
- Knighted 1974
- Founding member of the World Cultural Council in 1981.
