= Meicen =

Meicen (also Meigen) is an unknown location somewhere in the then-British North of England, the site of the battle of Gueith Meicen at which Cadwallon overthrew Eadwine, according to the Annales Cambriae for 631; Bede places this defeat on 12 October 633, at Hatfield (Old English Haethfelth).
