= The Hollow Hills =

1973 novel by Mary Stewart

- First edition
- Author: Mary Stewart
- Language: English
- Series: Arthurian Saga
- Genre: Fantasy
- Publisher: Hodder & Stoughton
- Publication date: 1973
- Publication place: United Kingdom
- Media type: Print (Hardback & Paperback)
- Pages: 446 pp
- ISBN: 0-340-17275-4
- OCLC: 15687642
- Preceded by: The Crystal Cave
- Followed by: The Last Enchantment

The Hollow Hills is a novel by Mary Stewart. It is the second in a quintet of novels covering the Arthurian Legends. This book is preceded by The Crystal Cave and succeeded by The Last Enchantment. The Hollow Hills was published in 1973.

== Plot summary ==
The protagonist and narrator is Merlin, who supervises the birth and raising of King Arthur. (In this version, Merlin's father is Aurelius Ambrosius, so he is Arthur's cousin.) The Duchess Ygraine is said to have conspired with him to herself bear Arthur to Uther Pendragon; whereafter Merlin goes into hiding, to evade accusations, and learns that Uther wishes the child to be hidden, until another (legitimate) son is born. In later chapters, Merlin gives the child to his own nurse Moravik, who later sends him to Count Ector of Galava to be trained in courtesy and warfare. Thereafter, Merlin visits Constantinople, where he learns from his relative Adhjan that Magnus Maximus (alias 'Macsen Wledig') possessed an especially beautiful and well-made sword, which was taken back to Britain after his death.

Inspired by a dream which he believes prophetic, Merlin finds the sword in a deserted temple of Mithras. There, Merlin becomes a hermit in an obscure shrine, providing healing to the injured and advice to the insecure. Later, Merlin becomes Arthur's tutor and that of two other boys: Arthur's foster-brother Cei and his friend Bedwyr. One day, Arthur discovers the sword of Maximus — his ancestor and Merlin's — hidden in a cave on an island in the centre of a lake, and names it Caliburn. Later he wins his first battle in a decisive victory against invading Saxons; thereupon his parentage is revealed and he is proclaimed the heir to Uther Pendragon. Shortly before he learns his identity, he unknowingly commits incest with his half-sister Morgause, and thus sires Mordred. When challenged to prove his birthright, he reveals Caliburn to the assembled kings.
