= The Wicked Day =

1983 novel by Mary Stewart

- First UK edition
- Author: Mary Stewart
- Language: English
- Series: Arthurian Saga
- Genre: Fantasy
- Publisher: Hodder & Stoughton
- Publication date: 1983
- Publication place: United Kingdom
- Media type: Print (hardcover, paperback)
- Pages: 350
- ISBN: 0-340-32237-3
- OCLC: 36085838
- Dewey Decimal: 823/.914 21
- LC Class: PR6069.T46 W5 1996
- Preceded by: The Last Enchantment
- Followed by: The Prince and the Pilgrim

The Wicked Day is the fourth novel in Mary Stewart's treatment of Arthurian legend. It was published by Hodder & Stoughton in 1983. It is preceded in the pentalogy by The Last Enchantment (1979), and succeeded by The Prince and the Pilgrim (1995).

== Overview ==
The protagonists of the story are Mordred and his father the king, Arthur. Lost as a youth, Mordred is raised by fisherfolk until he is returned to his birth mother Morgause. The novel portrays Mordred as a pawn of fate unlike many tales which paint him as the villain of the Arthurian saga.

The novel covers the time after Merlin's self-imposed exile and stretches to the deaths of Mordred and Arthur.
