= Groans of the Britons =

Briton missive to Rome, 5th century

The Groans of the Britons (Latin: gemitus Britannorum) is the final appeal made between 446 and 454 by the Britons to the Roman military for assistance against Pict and Scot raiders. The appeal is first referenced in Gildas' 6th-century De Excidio et Conquestu Britanniae; Gildas' account was later repeated in chapter 13 of Bede's Historia ecclesiastica gentis Anglorum. According to Gildas, the message was addressed to "Agitius", who is generally identified with the general Flavius Aetius. The collapsing Western Roman Empire had few military resources to spare during its decline, and the record is ambiguous on what the response to the appeal was, if any. According to Gildas and various later medieval sources, such as Procopius, the failure of the Roman armies to secure Britain led the Britons to invite Anglo-Saxon mercenaries to the island, precipitating the Anglo-Saxon settlement of Britain.

== Message ==
The message is recorded by Gildas in his De Excidio et Conquestu Britanniae, written in the second quarter of the sixth century and much later repeated by Bede. According to these sources, it was a last-ditch plea to "Agitius" for assistance. Agitius is generally identified as Aetius, magister militum of the Western Roman Empire who spent most of the 440s fighting insurgents in Gaul and Hispania. The Roman Britons had been beset by raids by the Picts and Scots from northern Britain, who were able to pillage far to the south after the Roman armies had withdrawn from the island in 407.

Gildas refers to Agitius as "Thrice Consul". If Gildas meant Flavius Aetius, and he was quoting the letter, it would imply that the letter was sent during the time period of his third consulship in 446. If, however, he was using "Thrice Consul" as a means of identifying a famous leader, the letter may have been sent during either of his three consulships: 432, 437, or 446. Leslie Alcock has raised a tentative possibility of the "Agitius" to whom the gemitus is directed actually being Aegidius—though he was never consul. This identification was supported by Stephen Johnson, but rejected by J. N. L. Myres. Miller left the possibility open. The usurper Constantine III had taken the last Roman troops from Britain in 407 and the civilian administration had been expelled by the natives a little later, leaving the inhabitants to fend for themselves during increasingly fraught times. Parts of the plea were recorded:

Agitio ter consuli, gemitus britannorum. [...] Repellunt barbari ad mare, repellit mare ad barbaros; inter haec duo genera funerum aut iugulamur aut mergimur.

— Quoted in Gildas, De Excidio et Conquestu Britanniae.
Translation:

To Agitius [or Aetius], thrice consul: the groans of the Britons. [...] The barbarians drive us to the sea, the sea drives us to the barbarians; between these two means of death, we are either killed or drowned.

— J. A. Giles's 1848 revision of T. Habington (1638)

The Romans, however, could not assist them, so the Britons were left to their own devices.

== Problems of interpretation ==
A second visit in around 446–7 by Germanus, a former Roman general who had become Bishop of Auxerre, recorded in his Vita by Constantius of Lyon, could have reflected Aetius' response to the message.

The reference to Aetius' third consulship (446) is useful in dating the increasing strife in Britain during this period. Gildas' mention of the appeal is a minor part of a much larger religious polemic, however, which means that the image described may be more hyperbolic than realistic, especially as his sources were probably derived from oral tradition. The traditional picture of Romano-British society in post-Roman Britain as besieged and chaotic is also being increasingly challenged by archaeological evidence which indicates a definitive series of migrations into England on the part of the Saxons.

The viewpoint of Gildas is coloured by his classicising rather than monastic education, based at some remove on the Roman education of a rhetor, a source of his elaborated and difficult Latin.

Gildas' narrative describes the Britons as being too impious and plagued by infighting to fend off the Saxons. They managed some successes against the invaders when they placed their faith in God's hands, but they were usually left to suffer greatly. Gildas mentions a "proud tyrant" who Bede names as Vortigern as the person who originally invited Germanic mercenaries to defend the borders.

No answer is recorded to the pleas of the British. There was an increasing Anglo-Saxon settlement of Britain in the fifth and sixth centuries and increasing Anglo-Saxon culture, including language.

== See also ==
- End of Roman rule in Britain
- Battle of Mons Badonicus
- Sub-Roman Britain
- Gododdin
- Kingdom of Gwent
- Wessex
