= Cavalry wing =

Cavalry units deployed for battle on an army's flank

The term cavalry wing in military history was used to refer to the cavalry units positioned on either of the army flanks when deployed for battle.

In ancient Greece, one of the standard battle tactics of the Macedonian army was to have a fast-moving cavalry wing outflank the enemy to the right and encircle them, drawing them in toward the army's slower-moving infantry phalanx. Alexander the Great led the right cavalry wing in the Battle of the Granicus.

In the British Army, the British Cavalry Wing was an administrative division that grouped horse-mounted cavalry units until it was amalgamated with the Royal Tank Corps on 4 April 1939 to create the Royal Armoured Corps.

The Romans used the term Ala, meaning wing, to denote their major cavalry units.
