= The Crystal Cave =

1970 novel by Mary Stewart

- First UK edition
- Author: Mary Stewart
- Language: English
- Series: Arthurian Saga
- Genre: Fantasy novel
- Publisher: Hodder & Stoughton (UK); William Morrow (US)
- Publication date: 1970
- Publication place: United Kingdom
- Media type: Print (Hardback & Paperback)
- Pages: 464 pp
- ISBN: 0-340-12872-0
- Followed by: The Hollow Hills

The Crystal Cave is a 1970 fantasy novel by Mary Stewart. The first in a quintet of novels covering the Arthurian legend, it is followed by The Hollow Hills.

== Plot introduction ==
The protagonist of this story is a boy named Myrddin Emrys, also known as Merlin, which is the Welsh form of the word "falcon". (Welsh dd is pronounced th as in thus, so Myrddin is roughly pronounced Murthin.) This story is told in first-person narrative and includes his journey to find a home as he travels through Wales, Brittany, England and Ireland. Emrys is also known as Ambrosius, or Prince of Light.

== Plot summary ==
This novel covers the time from Merlin's sixth year until he becomes a young man. The Romans have recently left Britain, which is now divided into a number of kingdoms loosely united under a High King. Merlin is the illegitimate son of a Welsh princess, who refuses to name his father. Small for his age and often abused or neglected, Merlin occasionally has clairvoyant visions. These visions and his unknown parentage cause him to be referred to as "the son of a devil" and "bastard child". Educated by a hermit, Galapas, who teaches him to use his psychic powers as well as his earthly gifts, Merlin eventually finds his way to the court of Ambrosius Aurelianus in Brittany. There, he assists in Ambrosius's preparations to invade and unify Britain, defeat Vortigern and his Saxon allies, and become its High King. Also exiled in Brittany is Uther, Ambrosius's brother, heir and supporter.

It is revealed that Merlin is Ambrosius's son, the result of a brief relationship between Ambrosius and Merlin's mother. Merlin returns to Britain but finds Galapas killed. He is captured by Vortigern who is attempting to build a fortress at Dinas Emrys – but each night the newly built walls collapse. The king's mystics say the fort will only be built when a child with no father is sacrificed and his blood spilt on the ground. Vortigern plans to use Merlin as the sacrifice. Merlin realises that the fort's foundation is unstable due to the caves below ground, but he plays to their superstition and pretends to attribute the problems to dragons beneath the ground. (The dragon is Ambrosius's emblem.) As a result of this, Merlin briefly becomes known as Vortigern's prophet. Days later, Ambrosius invades and defeats Vortigern.

Merlin uses his engineering skills to rebuild Stonehenge, but has visions of Ambrosius's death, which are fulfilled when a comet appears in the sky and Ambrosius dies. Uther, Ambrosius's younger brother, becomes King Uther Pendragon. However, Britain is thrown into chaos when Uther, besotted with Duchess Ygraine, goes to war with her husband, Gorlois, the Duke of Cornwall. Merlin helps Uther to enter Tintagel Castle by stealth, knowing the tryst will lead to the birth of King Arthur.

== Characters ==
- Merlin, known also as Myrddin, with Emrys as a sort of patronym. The stories explore his learning to use magic and his centrality in the Matter of Britain.
- Niniane, his mother, a Christian who joins the local nunnery when he is 12.
- King of Maridunum, an unnamed king of South Wales; grandfather of Merlin, father of Camlach and Niniane, married to Queen Olwen.
- Camlach, uncle of Merlin, he is prepared to kill Merlin to remove him from the line of inheritance.
- Galapas, a local mage who teaches Merlin much natural lore and some magic, and who bequeathes to him the crystal cave.
- Cerdic, a Saxon slave, friend to Merlin; he accidentally causes the death of the king.
- Vortigern, an ambitious warlord-king who battles Ambrosius for Britain.
- Ambrosius Aurelianus, Merlin's father; a Romanized Celt, he invades England from Lesser Britain when Merlin is 18 and has joined him.
- Uther Pendragon, Merlin's uncle, Ambrosius's younger brother, eventually High King of Britain and father of King Arthur. He and Merlin retain an alliance, if not friendship, throughout their lives.
- Cadal, servant to Ambrosius and then to Merlin.
- Gorlois, Duke of Cornwall, is loyal to Ambrosius but later betrayed by Uther and Merlin, who conspire to get his young wife, Ygraine, together with Uther; Gorlois dies in battle that same night.
- Ygraine, Duchess of Cornwall and mother of Arthur.
- Ralf, loyal page to Ygraine; he later serves Merlin.
- Ulfin, servant to Uther and, at times, Merlin.

== The Cave ==
The crystal cave itself is a spherical mini-cave hidden in the back of a hillside cave six miles from the king's palace at Maridunum. It is described, in young Merlin's first discovery of it, as "a globe, a round chamber floored, roofed, lined with crystals. They were fine as glass, and smooth as glass, but clearer than any glass I had ever seen, brilliant as diamonds." The facets are possibly those of geodes.

The hill is considered by the locals to be a home or haunt of a deity named Myrddin, a god of air and heights, so its cave is imbued with magical properties. Merlin lives there whenever not called upon for political duties. The small crystal cave is where he frequently retreats to seek revelations or prophecies.

== Reception ==
In Stewart's obituary, The New York Times described her as an "author of romantic thrillers who jumped genres in her 50s to create an internationally best-selling trilogy of Merlin books, reimagining the Arthurian legend from a sorcerer's point of view," and said, "Reading Geoffrey of Monmouth's History of the Kings of Britain, she was inspired to retell the story of King Arthur as seen by Merlin, the king's adviser and house magician. The trilogy introduced her work to a new generation and, in many cases, to male readers for the first time. ... The books, set in the fifth century, were praised for their unusual blend of fantasy and historical detail."

The Guardian spoke of Stewart's own considerations as well as that of her publishers: "The Crystal Cave (1970), the first of a fictional trilogy about Merlin, arose from her fascination with Roman-British history. The unexpected switch at first alarmed her publishers – she was, unusually, published by the same firm, Hodder & Stoughton, for her entire career, never using an agent – but the book was a No 1 bestseller for weeks. Of all her books, The Crystal Cave is the most enduring, and has lost none of its freshness. It is a masterful imagining of Merlin's upbringing that vividly evokes fifth-century Britain. The Hollow Hills (1973) and The Last Enchantment (1979) completed the trilogy, earning Stewart favourable comparisons with another leading Arthurian, TH White. They were the books of which she was most proud."

Kirkus Reviews said with a touch of disdain, "With its mythic mists and galloping legends, fifth century Britain is fair game and Miss Stewart takes to whole cloth with a couturier's skill. ... Period play, ripe and windy, for ladies easily lulled--and there are many of them."

== Film, TV or theatrical adaptations ==
The novel was adapted into a television series by the BBC in the 1990s, retitled Merlin of the Crystal Cave, and starred Robert Powell as Ambrosius.
