= Mary Stewart (novelist) =

British novelist (1916–2014)

- Born: Mary Florence Elinor Rainbow; 17 September 1916; Sunderland, County Durham, England
- Died: 9 May 2014 (aged 97); Lochawe, Scotland
- Education: Durham University
- Occupation: Novelist
- Spouse: Sir Frederick Stewart (m. 1945; died 2001)
- Writing career
- Pen name: Mary Stewart
- Language: English
- Period: 1954–1997
- Genre: Romantic mystery

Mary, Lady Stewart (born Mary Florence Elinor Rainbow; 17 September 1916 – 9 May 2014) was a British novelist who developed the romantic mystery genre, featuring smart, adventurous heroines who could hold their own in dangerous situations. She also wrote children's books and poetry, but may be best known for her Merlin series, which straddles the boundary between the historical novel and fantasy.

Adaptations of her books include both The Moon-Spinners: a Walt Disney live-action movie, and The Little Broomstick (1971) which became an animated feature film titled Mary and the Witch's Flower (2017, dir. Hiromasa Yonebayashi).

== Early life and education ==
Mary Florence Elinor Rainbow was born on 17 September 1916 in Sunderland, County Durham, England, UK, daughter of Mary Edith Matthews, a primary school teacher from New Zealand, and Frederick Albert Rainbow, a vicar.

She was a bright child and attended Eden Hall boarding school in Penrith, Cumbria, age eight. She was bullied there and stated that this had a lasting effect on her. At ten, she won a scholarship to Skellfield School, Ripon, Yorkshire, where she excelled at sport. Offered places by Oxford, Cambridge, and Durham universities, she chose Durham as it offered the largest bursary and least travel.

She graduated from Durham University in 1938 with first-class honours in English, was awarded a first-class Teaching Diploma in English with Art the following year and in 1941 gained her master's degree.

== Academic teaching ==
Stewart held a variety of posts during World War II, including primary school teaching, teaching at secondary level at a girls' boarding school, and working part-time at the sixth form of Durham School. Between 1941 and 1956, she was an assistant lecturer (1941–5) and part-time lecturer (1948–56) in English literature, mostly Anglo-Saxon, at Durham University. She received an honorary D.Litt. in 2009. It was in Durham that she met and married her husband, Frederick Stewart, a young Scot who lectured in Geology. She became known as Mary Stewart.

In 1956, the couple moved to Edinburgh. Mary, in her own words, was a "born storyteller" and had been writing stories since the age of three. Following the move to Scotland, she submitted a novel to the publishers Hodder & Stoughton. Madam, Will You Talk? was an immediate success, followed by many other successful works over the years.

== Writing career ==
Stewart was the best-selling author of many romantic suspense and historical fiction novels. They were well received by critics, due especially to her skilful story-telling and elegant prose. Her novels are also known for their well-crafted settings, many in England but also in such locations as Damascus and the Greek islands, as well as Spain, France, and Austria.

Stewart herself said that her pleasure was to take "conventionally bizarre situations (the car chase, the closed-room murder, the wicked uncle tale) and send real people into them, normal, everyday people with normal, everyday reactions to violence and fear; people not 'heroic' in the conventional sense, but averagely intelligent men and women who could be shocked or outraged into defending, if necessary, with great physical bravery, what they held to be right".

She was at the height of her popularity from the late 1950s to the 1980s, when many of her novels were translated into other languages. The Moon-Spinners, one of her most popular novels, was also made into a Walt Disney live-action movie. In 2017 The Little Broomstick (1971) was adapted into the animated feature film titled Mary and the Witch's Flower.

Stewart was one of the most prominent writers of the romantic suspense subgenre (The Guardian called her its "pioneer"), blending romance novels and mystery. Critically, her works are considered superior to those of other acclaimed romantic suspense novelists, such as Victoria Holt and Phyllis Whitney. She seamlessly combined the two genres, maintaining a full mystery while focusing on the courtship between two people, so that the process of solving the mystery "helps to illuminate" the hero's personality—thereby helping the heroine to fall in love with him.

In the late 1960s a new generation of young readers revived a readership in T. H. White's The Once and Future King (published in full 1958) and The Lord of the Rings (published in full 1956), and as a consequence Arthurian and heroic legends regained popularity among a critical mass of readers. Mary Stewart added to this climate by publishing The Crystal Cave (1970), the first in what was to become The Merlin Trilogy (full series: The Arthurian Saga). The books placed Stewart on the best-seller list many times throughout the 1970s and 1980s.

== Personal life ==
Mary Rainbow met and married her husband, Frederick Stewart, a young Scot lecturer in Geology, whilst they were both working at Durham University. They were married by her father in September 1945 after having met at a VE Day dance; their engagement was announced in The Times only one month after they met. At 30, she suffered an ectopic pregnancy, undiagnosed for several weeks, and as a consequence could not have children.

In 1956, they moved to Edinburgh, where he became professor of geology and mineralogy, and later chairman of the Geology Department at University of Edinburgh.

In 1974, Mary's husband Frederick Stewart was knighted and she became Lady Stewart, although she never used the title. Her husband died in 2001.

In semi-retirement Stewart resided in Edinburgh as well as near Loch Awe. An avid gardener, Mary and her husband shared a keen love of nature. She was also fond of her cat Tory, a black and white female, who lived to be eighteen.

Mary Stewart died on 9 May 2014. Her entry in the Oxford Dictionary of National Biography was added in 2022.

== Adaptations ==
Her novel The Moon-Spinners was very loosely adapted as The Moon-Spinners by Walt Disney Productions in 1964. Directed by James Neilson, it starred Hayley Mills, Eli Wallach and Peter McEnery.

Three of her children's novels (The Little Broomstick, Ludo and the Star Horse and A Walk in Wolf Wood) were adapted for Jackanory.

The first novel in her Arthurian Saga, The Crystal Cave, was adapted for television in 1991 as Merlin of the Crystal Cave. Directed by Michael Darlow, it starred George Winter, Robert Powell and Jon Finch.

The Little Broomstick was adapted as the 2017 animated feature film Mary and the Witch's Flower, directed by Hiromasa Yonebayashi.

== Awards ==
=== Fantasy genre ===
Award	Work	Result	Ref.
Frederick Niven Literary Award	The Crystal Cave (1970)	Won	
Mythopoeic Fantasy Award	The Crystal Cave (1970)	Won	
Mythopoeic Fantasy Award	The Hollow Hills (1973)	Won	
Scottish Arts Council Award	Ludo and the Star Horse (1974)	Won	

=== Mystery genre ===
Award	Work	Result	Ref.
Agatha Award	Lifetime Achievement	Won	
Edgar Allan Poe Award	This Rough Magic (1964)	Nominated	
Edgar Allan Poe Award	Airs Above the Ground (1965)	Nominated	
Gold Dagger Award	My Brother Michael (1961)	Nominated	

== Published works ==
=== Romantic suspense novels ===
- Madam, Will You Talk? (1955)
- Wildfire at Midnight (1956)
- Thunder on the Right (1957)
- Nine Coaches Waiting (1958)
- My Brother Michael (1959)
- The Ivy Tree (1961)
- The Moon-Spinners (1962), filmed as The Moon-Spinners
- This Rough Magic (1964)
- Airs Above the Ground (1965)
- The Gabriel Hounds (1967)
- The Wind Off the Small Isles (1968)
- Touch Not the Cat (1976)
- Thornyhold (1988)
- Stormy Petrel (1991)
- Rose Cottage (1997)

=== The Arthurian Saga ===
1. The Crystal Cave (1970)
2. The Hollow Hills (1973)
3. The Last Enchantment (1979)
4. The Wicked Day (1983)
5. The Prince and the Pilgrim (1995)

=== Children's novels ===
- The Little Broomstick (1971) (adapted as the 2017 animated feature film Mary and the Witch's Flower)
- Ludo and the Star Horse (1974)
- A Walk in Wolf Wood (1980)
- The Castle of Danger (1981) - children's version of Nine Coaches Waiting (1958)

=== Poetry ===
- Frost on the Window: And other Poems (1990) (poetry collection)
