= The Last Enchantment =

1979 novel by Mary Stewart

- First UK edition
- Author: Mary Stewart
- Language: English
- Series: Arthurian Saga
- Genre: Fantasy
- Publisher: Hodder & Stoughton (UK); William Morrow (US)
- Publication date: 1979
- Publication place: United Kingdom
- Media type: Print (Hardcover & Paperback)
- Pages: 448
- ISBN: 0-340-23917-4
- OCLC: 8627029
- Preceded by: The Hollow Hills
- Followed by: The Wicked Day

The Last Enchantment is a 1979 fantasy novel by Mary Stewart. It is the third in a quintet of novels covering the Arthurian legend, preceded by The Hollow Hills and succeeded by The Wicked Day.

== Plot introduction ==
The protagonist of this story is the clairvoyant and wise Merlin, the wizard of legend, who is recounting his story of the reign of Arthur Pendragon as he oversees Arthur's destiny to become the great king Merlin has predicted.

== Plot summary ==
This novel covers the time from when Arthur Pendragon first becomes king to the time Merlin, now getting on in years, begins to lose his powers and becomes a sort of master spy to assist King Arthur as he begins the task of uniting all of Britain.

Arthur is now King and hard at work establishing Camelot as the center of government and authority. A few ambitious lords from other parts of Britain have designs on Arthur's throne, and Merlin is kept busy preventing them from doing so. Having taken Morgause (unaware that she was his half-sister) to his bed as a very young man after his first battle and victory, Arthur is now the father of Mordred. Merlin foresees that Mordred will be the cause of Arthur's death, but doesn't understand how it will happen. He spends a great deal of time traveling in disguise and observing Morgause's scheming and intrigue.

Somewhere along the line, Merlin takes on a female apprentice, Niniane. When she first appears she is disguised as a boy, and Merlin initially takes her for the reincarnation of a child he had seen some years before whom he would have chosen as apprentice, but who died unexpectedly. Niniane is at that time not quite as gifted as Merlin himself, but he teaches her everything he knows, and they fall in love despite their age difference. As he gives her the secrets of his psychic abilities and how to control them, he seems to lose them himself. In a depleted, weakened condition, he takes ill and falls into a coma, and is believed to be dead. Mourning him, Niniane has him buried within his beloved crystal cave. She begins to have prescient nightmares that Merlin is actually alive; he awakes in the cave some time later. He escapes after a few weeks, through a combination of chance luck and ingenious planning, and travels incognito to let Arthur know he is still alive. Niniane takes Merlin's place as the court wizard-seer, while Merlin retires to the crystal cave and lives a quiet and happy life as a hermit, much like his old master in the first volume of the series.

== Release details ==
- 1979, UK, Hodder & Stoughton (ISBN 0-340-23917-4), Pub date Jun 1979, Hardcover
- 1979, USA, William Morrow (ISBN 0-688-03481-0, Pub date Jul 1979, Hardcover
- 1980, UK, Coronet, (ISBN 0-340-25829-2), Pub date 1980, Paperback
- 1981, USA, Fawcett (ISBN 0-449-24207-2), Pub date 12 December 1981, Paperback
- 1982, USA, G. K. Hall & Company (ISBN 0-8161-3340-9), Pub date 1982, Large print
- 1983, USA, Fawcett (ISBN 0-449-20508-8), Pub date 12 October 1983, Paperback
- 1984, USA, Fawcett (ISBN 0-449-20646-7), Pub date 12 July 1984, Paperback
- 1996, USA, Ballantine Books (ISBN 0-449-91176-4), Pub date 29 September 1996, Paperback
- 2003, USA, Eos (ISBN 0-06-054827-4), Pub date 1 May 2003, Paperback
