= Roman Catholic Diocese of Tréguier =

Coordinates: 48.79°N 3.23°W

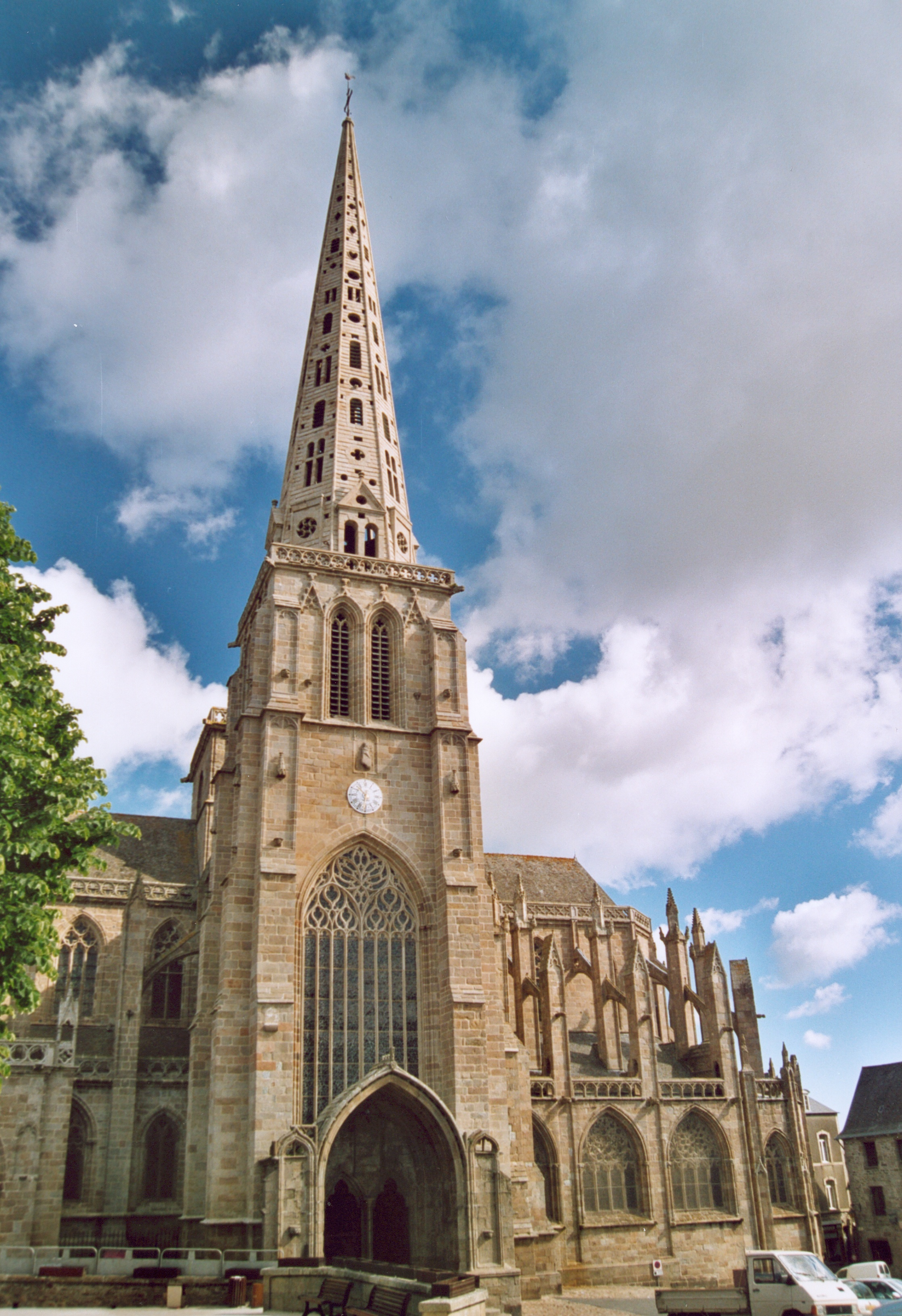
Tréguier Cathedral

The former Breton and French diocese of Tréguier existed in Lower Brittany from about the sixth century, or later, to the French Revolution. Its see was at Tréguier, in the modern department of Côtes-d'Armor.

The title continues in the contemporary diocese of Saint-Brieuc and Tréguier.

== History ==
St. Tudgual (Tugdual, Tudual), said to be the nephew of Saint-Brieuc (who had emigrated from Cardigan), was a bishop who came to Brittany from overseas (Scotland), and was appointed by his uncle Brieuc at the close of the fifth century as superior of the monastery of Tréguier, which Tudual had founded. The biography of St. Tudual, composed after the middle of the ninth century, relates that Tudual, wishing to confirm his authority by royal approval, travelled to the court of King Childebert I, who ordered him consecrated Bishop of Tréguier. Louis Duchesne, however, argued that it was King Nomenoe who, in the middle of the ninth century, had the monastery of Tréguier raised to the dignity of an episcopal see.

Numerous synods were held at Tréguier in the fourteenth and fifteenth centuries, and passed regulations for the discipline of the Breton churches.

== Bishops ==
=== to 1400 ===
- c. 1032: William I
- c. 1045: Martin
- c. 1086: Hugo I de Saint-Pabutral
- c. 1110–c. 1128: Raoul I
- c. 1150–c. 1175: William II
- 1175–1179: Ives I Hougnon
- 1179–c. 1220: Geoffroi I Loiz
- c. 1224–c. 1237: Stephan
- c. 1238: Peter I
- 1255–c. 1265: Hamon
- c. 1266–c. 1271: Alain I de Lezardrieu
- c. 1284: Alain II de Bruc
- 1286–c. 1310: Geoffroi II de Tournemine
- c. 1317: Jean I Rigaud
- c. 1324: Pierre II de l'Isle
- 1327–1330: Ives II Le Prévôt de Bois Boëssel
- 1330–1338: Alain III de Haïloury
- 1339–c. 1345: Richard du Poirier
- c. 1354: Robert I de Peynel
- 1355–1358: Hugues II de Monstrelet
- 1358–1362: Alain IV
- 28 November 1362 – 1371: Even Bégaignon
- 12 June 1372 – 1378: Jean II Brun
- 1378–1383: Thibaud de Malestroit
- 1383–1384: Hugues III de Keroulay
- 1385–3 May 1401: Pierre III Morel

=== 1400 to 1600 ===
- 1401–1403: Ives III Hirgouët
- 1404–1408: Bernard de Peyron
- 1408–1416: Christophe I d'Hauterive
- 15. December 1417 – 1422: Matthieu du Kosker
- 29. April 1422 – 1430: Jean III de Bruc
- 1430–27. August 1435: Pierre IV Piédru (or Predou) (also Bishop of Saint-Malo)
- 1435–1441: Raoul II Rolland
- 4. May 1442 – 1453: Jean IV de Plouec
- 16. March 1454–23. September 1464: Jean V de Coetquis
- 8. January 1466 – 1479: Christophe II du Châtel
- 1480–1483: Cardinal Raphaël de Saint-Georges
- 1483–1502: Robert II Guibé
- 1502–7. March 1505: Jean VI de Talhouët
- 22 November 1505–16. November 1537: Antoine du Grignaux
- 14 June 1538 – 1540 or 1541: Louis de Bourbon-Vendôme
- 1541–1544: Cardinal Hippolyte d'Este
- 1544–1545: Jean VII de Rieux
- 8 June 1545 – 1547: François I de Manaz
- 1548–27. October 1566: Jean VIII Juvénal des Ursins
- 1566–1572: Claude de Kernovenoy
- 1572–1583: Jean-Baptiste Le Gras
- 1583–1593: François II de La Tour
- 1593–29. October 1602: Guillace III du Halgoët

=== 1600 to 1800 ===
- 1604–29. July 1616: Georges-Louet-Adrien d'Amboise
- 1616–1620: Pierre V Cornullier
- 1620–14. September 1635: Gui Champion
- 1636–19. August 1645: Noël des Landes'
- 1646–1679: Balthasar Grangier de Liverdis
- 1679–1686: François-Ignace de Baglion
- 1686–15. May 1694: Eustache Le Sénéchal de Carcado (or Kercado)
- 1694–1731: Olivier Jégou de Kervilio
- 1731–1745: François-Hyacinthe de La Fruglaye de Kervers
- 1746–30. August 1761: Charles-Gui Le Borgne de Kermorvan
- 1761–1766: Joseph-Dominique de Chaylus
- 26. April 1767 – 1773: Jean-Marc de Royère
- 1773–1775: Jean-Augustin de Frétat de Sarra
- 6 August 1775 – 1780: Jean-Baptiste-Joseph de Lubersac
- 1780–1790 (1801): Augustin-René-Louis Le Mintier

== See also ==
- Catholic Church in France
- List of Catholic dioceses in France

== Bibliography ==
=== Reference works ===
- Gams, Pius Bonifatius (1873). Series episcoporum Ecclesiae catholicae: quotquot innotuerunt a beato Petro apostolo. Ratisbon: Typis et Sumptibus Georgii Josephi Manz. pp. 641–642. (Use with caution; obsolete)
- Eubel, Conradus, ed. (1913). Hierarchia catholica, Tomus 1 (second ed.). Münster: Libreria Regensbergiana. (in Latin) p. 494.
- Eubel, Conradus, ed. (1914). Hierarchia catholica, Tomus 2 (second ed.). Münster: Libreria Regensbergiana. (in Latin) p. 254.
- Gulik, Guilelmus (1923). Eubel, Conradus (ed.). Hierarchia catholica, Tomus 3 (second ed.). Münster: Libreria Regensbergiana. p. 317.
- Gauchat, Patritius (Patrice) (1935). Hierarchia catholica IV (1592–1667). Münster: Libraria Regensbergiana. pp. 342.
- Ritzler, Remigius; Sefrin, Pirminus (1952). Hierarchia catholica medii et recentis aevi V (1667–1730). Patavii: Messagero di S. Antonio. p. 387.
- Ritzler, Remigius; Sefrin, Pirminus (1958). Hierarchia catholica medii et recentis aevi VI (1730–1799). Patavii: Messagero di S. Antonio. pp. 413–414.

=== Studies ===
- Chadwick, Nora Kershaw (1969). Early Brittany. Cardiff: University of Wales Press. ISBN 9780900768262.
- Duchesne, Louis (1910). Fastes épiscopaux de l'ancienne Gaule: II. L'Aquitaine et les Lyonnaises. Paris: Fontemoing. second edition (in French)
- Hauréau, Barthélemy (1856). Gallia Christiana: In Provincias Ecclesiasticas Distributa... De provincia Turonensi (in Latin). Vol. Tomus Quartus decimus (XIV). Paris: Typographia Regia. pp. 1119–1142, Instrumenta, pp. 271–274.
- Jean, Armand (1891). Les évêques et les archevêques de France depuis 1682 jusqu'à 1801 (in French). Paris: A. Picard. pp. 454–458.
- Poquet du Haut-Jussé, B.A. (1947). "Les évêques de Bretagne dans la renaissance religeuse du XVIIe siècle". Annales de Bretagne (in French). 54: 30–59. doi:10.3406/abpo.1947.1847.
