= Tréguier Cathedral =

Church in Côtes-d'Armor, France

Coordinates: 48°47′16″N 3°13′51″W

Tréguier Cathedral Cathédrale Saint-Tugdual de Tréguier
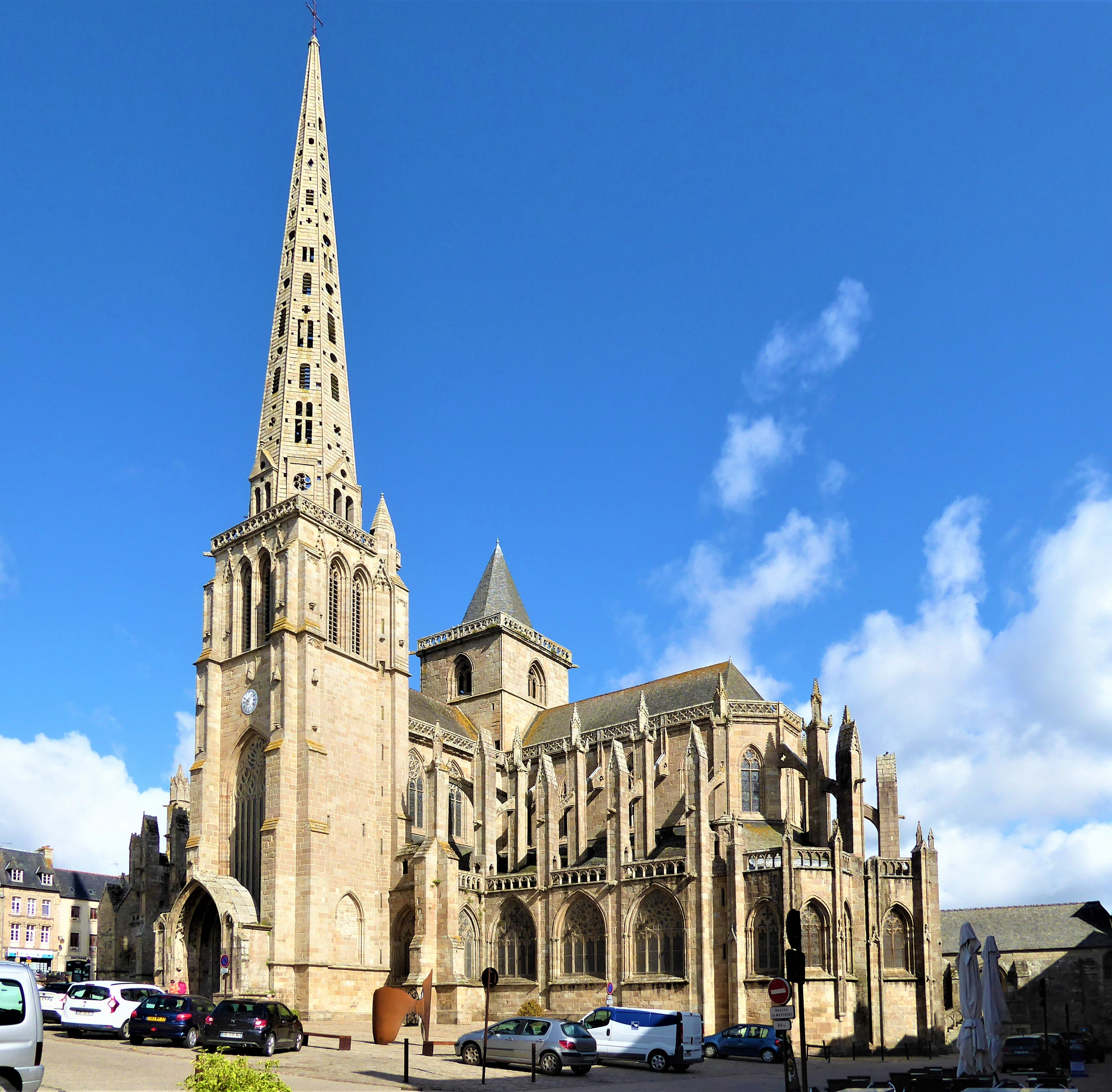
- Tréguier Cathedral

Religion
- Affiliation: Roman Catholic Church
- Province: Bishopric of Tréguier
- Region: Côtes-d'Armor
- Rite: Roman Rite
- Ecclesiastical or organisational status: Cathedral
- Status: Active

Location
- Location: Tréguier, France
- Interactive map of Tréguier Cathedral; Cathédrale Saint-Tugdual de Tréguier

Architecture
- Type: church
- Style: Gothic
- Groundbreaking: 6th century
- Completed: 19th century

Tréguier Cathedral (French: Cathédrale Saint-Tugdual de Tréguier) is a Roman Catholic Church and former cathedral in Tréguier, Côtes-d'Armor, France. It is dedicated to Saint Tudwal. The church was formerly the seat of the Bishopric of Tréguier, abolished under the Concordat of 1801, when its territories were divided between the Diocese of Quimper and the Diocese of Saint-Brieuc, known since 1852 as Saint-Brieuc-Tréguier.

== History ==
=== Early cathedral ===
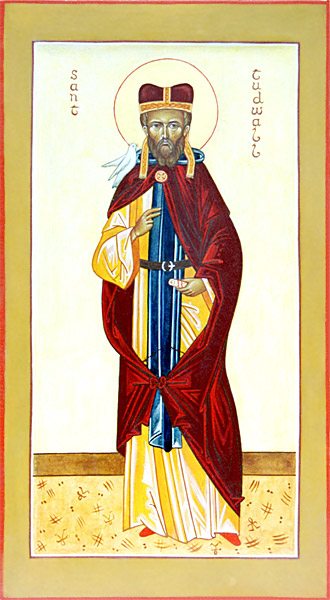
An icon depicting Saint Tugdual

The existence of this cathedral in a small town is due to the fact that Tréguier was to become a place of pilgrimage for two men; Saint Tugdual, a Welshman and Saint Yves. Tréguier is no longer the seat of a bishop, the bishopric having been abolished in 1801 when it was divided between the diocese of Quimper and Saint-Brieuc. However the church is still referred to as Tréguier Cathedral.

It was in the 6th century that Anglo-Saxon invasions caused Saint Tugdual to leave Wales and settle in Brittany. Tugdual had been a pupil at the monastery of Llanwit Major founded by Saint Illtud, but now, with his mother and several fellow monks, he settled at a point where the rivers Guidy, Jaudy and their estuary joined. Eventually around 532, he founded a monastery which he called "Landreguer" ("the monastery of three rivers"). Tugdual was made a bishop by the Breton king, Childebert I and from the Landreguer monastery emerged a cathedral dedicated to Saint André.

The Norman invasions of the 9th century saw Tréguier and the cathedral ravaged so heavily that the then bishop, Monseigneur Gorennan, fled and had Tugdual's body moved to Chartres. There was no bishop in residence for 90 years, but finally, the invaders were forced out by Alan II, Duke of Brittany. The bishopric of Tréguier was created in 950 but the first bishops had to be content with a wooden cathedral until in around 970 Bishop Gratias encouraged the building of a new cathedral in the Romanesque style. Of this building all that is left today is the north transept tower known as the "Hastings" tower, named rather strangely after one of the leaders of the Norman invaders, and some of the internal columns or pillars.

=== Gothic cathedral ===
It was in 1339 that construction of the Gothic cathedral was started, this during the bishopric of Richard de Poirier. Work commenced with the West Porch but only two years later the War of Breton Succession forced further building to be halted. Brittany was to be exhausted and ruined by this war, fought between the de Blois and de Monfort families, the former assisted by the French and the latter by the English. In 1345, the English invaded the area and used the cathedral as part of their garrison destroying much of the building in the process save for the tomb of Saint Yves which they left untouched. The Treaty of Guérande finally brought the fighting to a halt and this allowed the building work to be restarted, firstly from 1363 to 1371 during the bishopric of Bishop Begaignon when the nave and side-aisles were completed as well as the "porche du Peuple" and then during the bishopric of Bishop Morelli between 1385 and 1400. Morelli's coat of arms can be seen in the vaulting keystone of the second choir crossing.

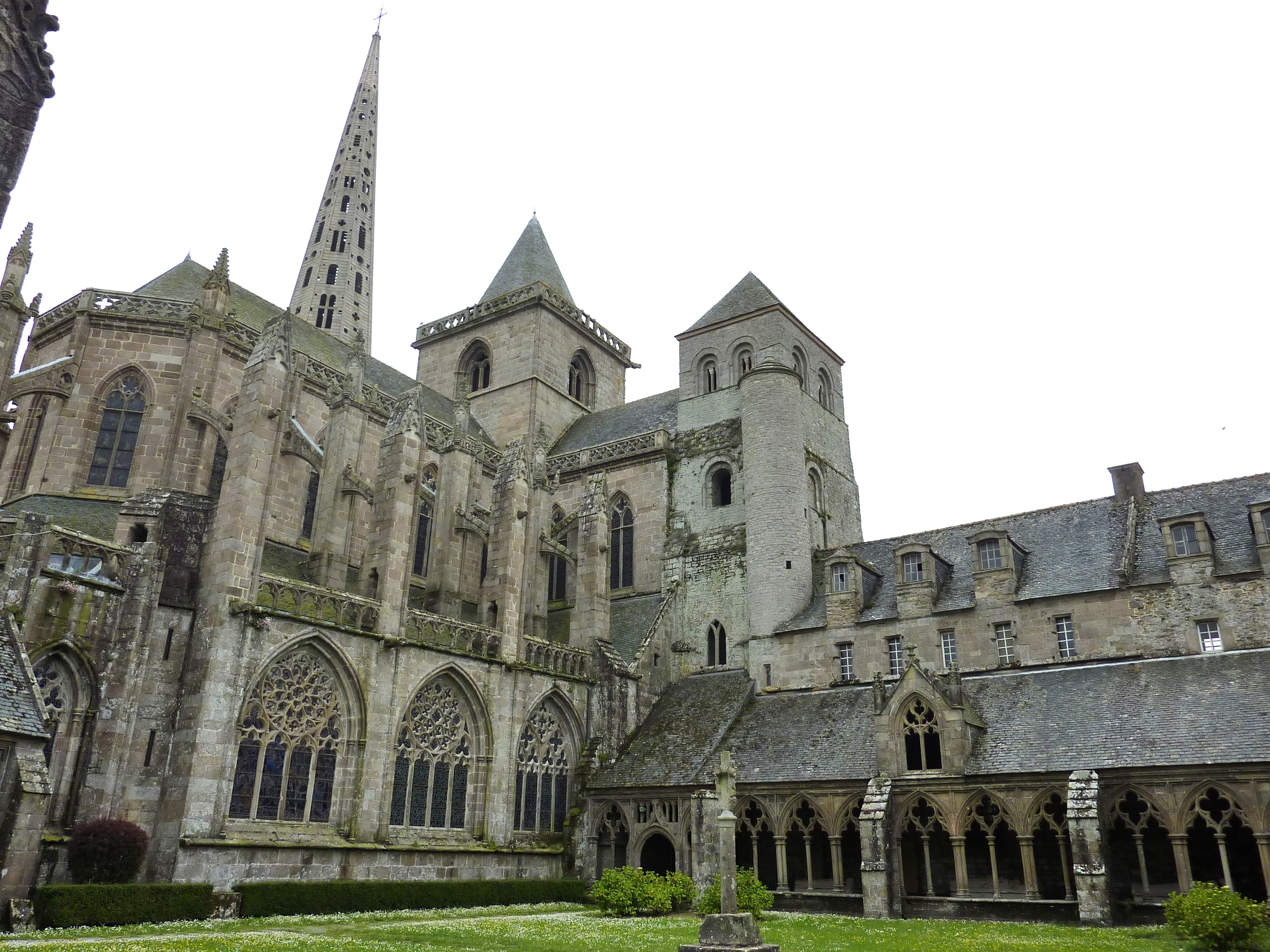
A view of the cathédrale Saint-Tugdual in Tréguier. Note the north flank of the choir, the spire of the "Tour des Cloches", the "Sanctus" and "Hastings" towers and the west gallery of the cloisters.

In around 1432, the south porch was completed under Bishop Pierre Pédru and Bishop Jean de Ploeuc had frescoes and stained glass windows added to the cathedral although the windows were removed during the revolution. In 1420, Duke Jean V had a chapel created so that he could be buried alongside Saint-Yves, the end of the 15th century saw the building of the cloisters, 1515 saw the construction of the choir's flying buttresses, and in 1648 the stalls which dated back to 1509 were restored.

Between 1785 and 1787, a stone spire replaced the existing lead-covered spire, partly financed by a generous loan from Louis XVI. Bishop Augustin Le Mintier instigated this, and the plans and services were used of the civil engineer François Anfray.

In 1793 the cathedral was sacked by a battalion of revolutionaries but in 1801, it returned to being a place of worship. The cathedral was restored and Prosper Mérimée took an active part in the cathedral's restitution in his role as "Inspecteur Général des monuments historiques". In 1860, houses and shops around the cathedral were cleared to create space and allow the cathedral to be visible without obstruction, the cloisters were restored in 1910 and in 1946 the building was given the status of a "Basilique Mineure".

== General description ==
The building takes the shape of a Latin cross with a length of 75 metres and a width of 17.45 metres. The length of the transept is 40 metres, the arms of the transept 7 metres and the height of the internal vaulting 18 metres.

The vaulted nave has seven crossings, and the sides comprise three levels starting with grand arcades, then a triforium and finally high windows. Such an elevation is very much a gothic convention inspired by Chartres. The nave crossings vary in length and the columns are not uniform, no doubt explained by the fact that the columns of the first three crossings date to the beginning of the 14th century whilst the other four columns were erected in the second half of the 14th century.

=== Towers ===
The cathedral has three towers. The first of these is a tower which dates to the 12th century and is all that is left of the Romanesque building. It is called the "Tour Hastings". The tower has three stories, the upper story having two semicircular windows on each face. The lower story has a single bay on three of its faces. A stairway goes up to the north-east turret. The next tower is over the cathedral sacristy and is called the "Tour du Sanctus", probably because the "Sanctus" was rung from here announcing a mass. The pointed roof of the "Tour du Sanctus" is surrounded by an ornate balustrade. The third tower is called the "Tour Neuve" and from this the cathedral spire rises, having been erected in 1787 to replace a bell-tower made from lead. From the same standpoint of the Hôtel de Ville, one can see Francis Renaud's monument depicting a Trėguier woman grieving over the death of a loved one.

The cathedral possesses a cloister with 48 Flamboyant Gothic style arcades and is located on the northeast of the building in the angle formed by the choir and the north arm of the transept, It was constructed in 1460 and consecrated in 1468.

== The cathedral exterior ==
Seen from the place du Martray, the nave part of the cathedral's exterior displays massive buttresses and large flying buttresses. The central buttresses of the choir have pilasters some having 4 statues at their base depicting Breton saints and legendary figures.

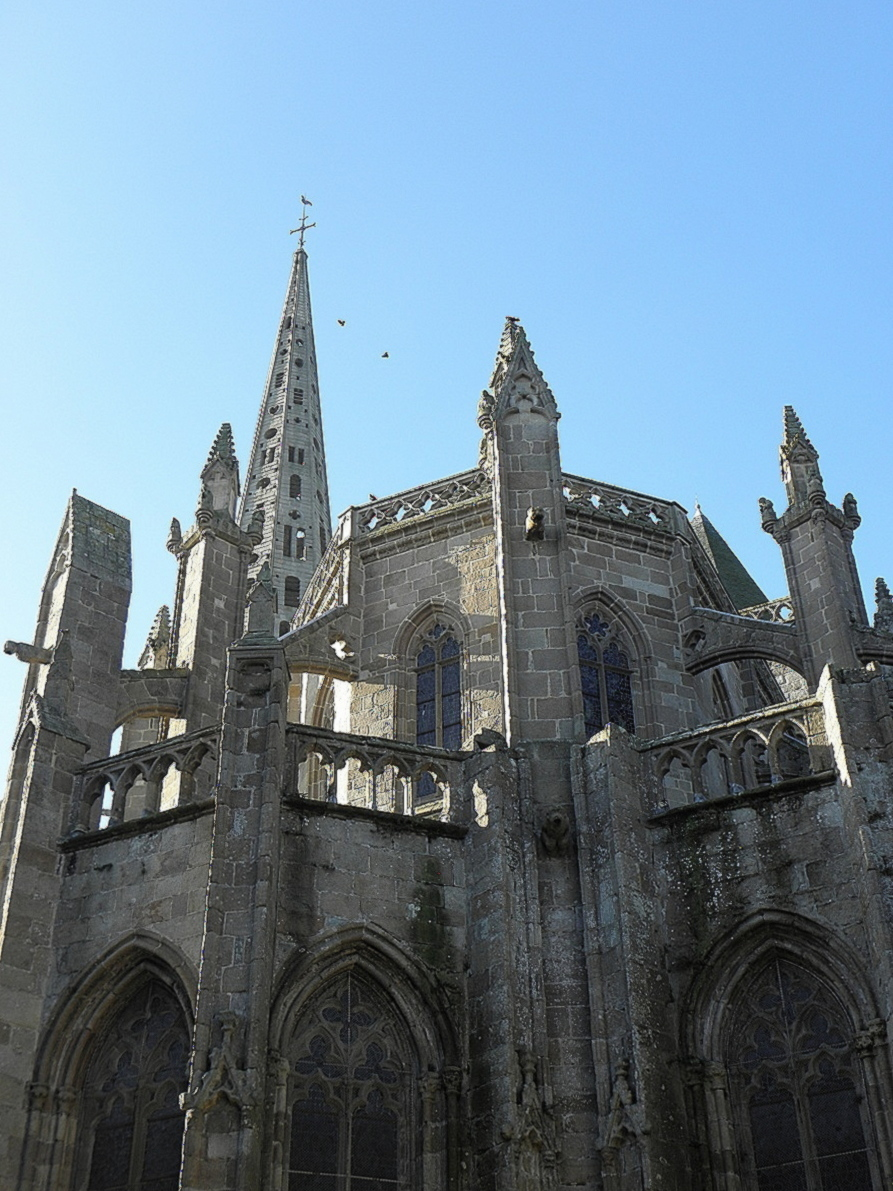
View of the chevet

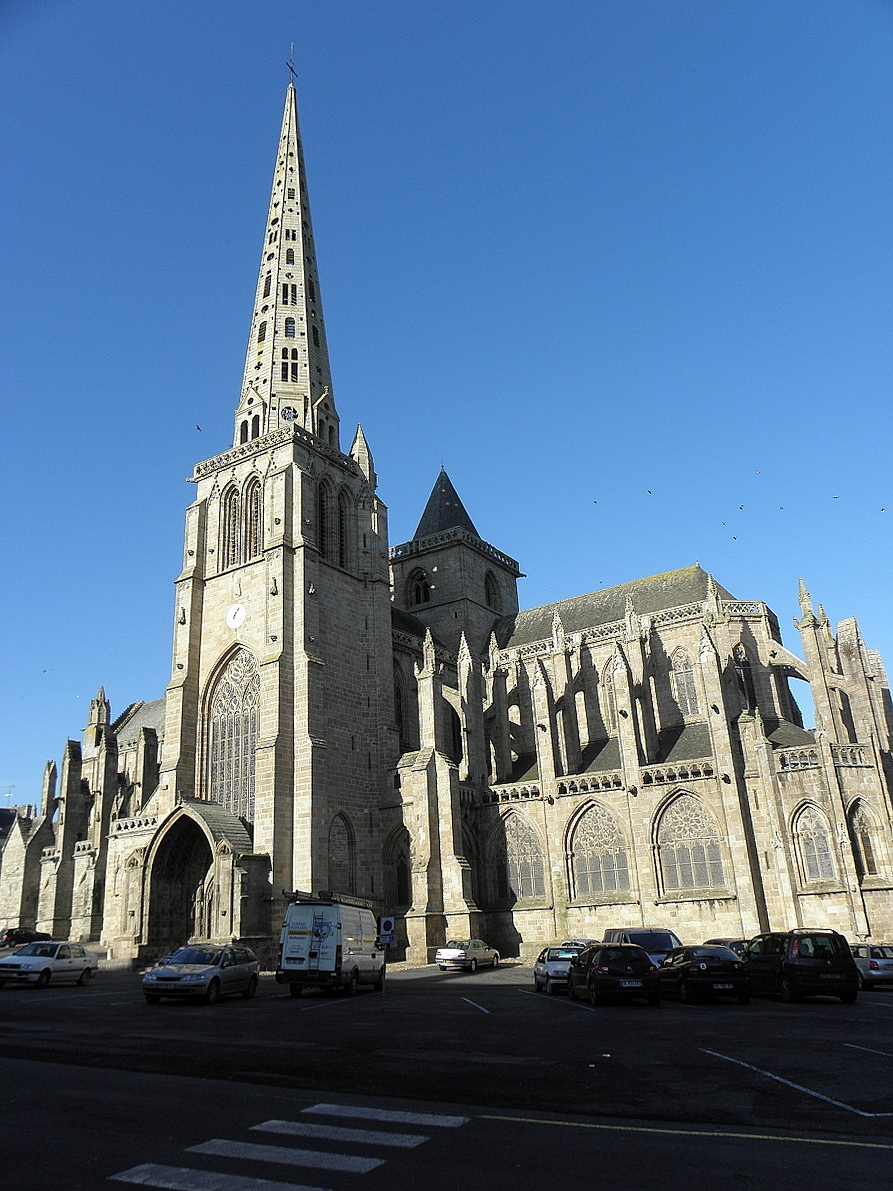
View of the chevet, the "Tour des Cloches", the " Sanctus" tower and the cathedral's south flank.

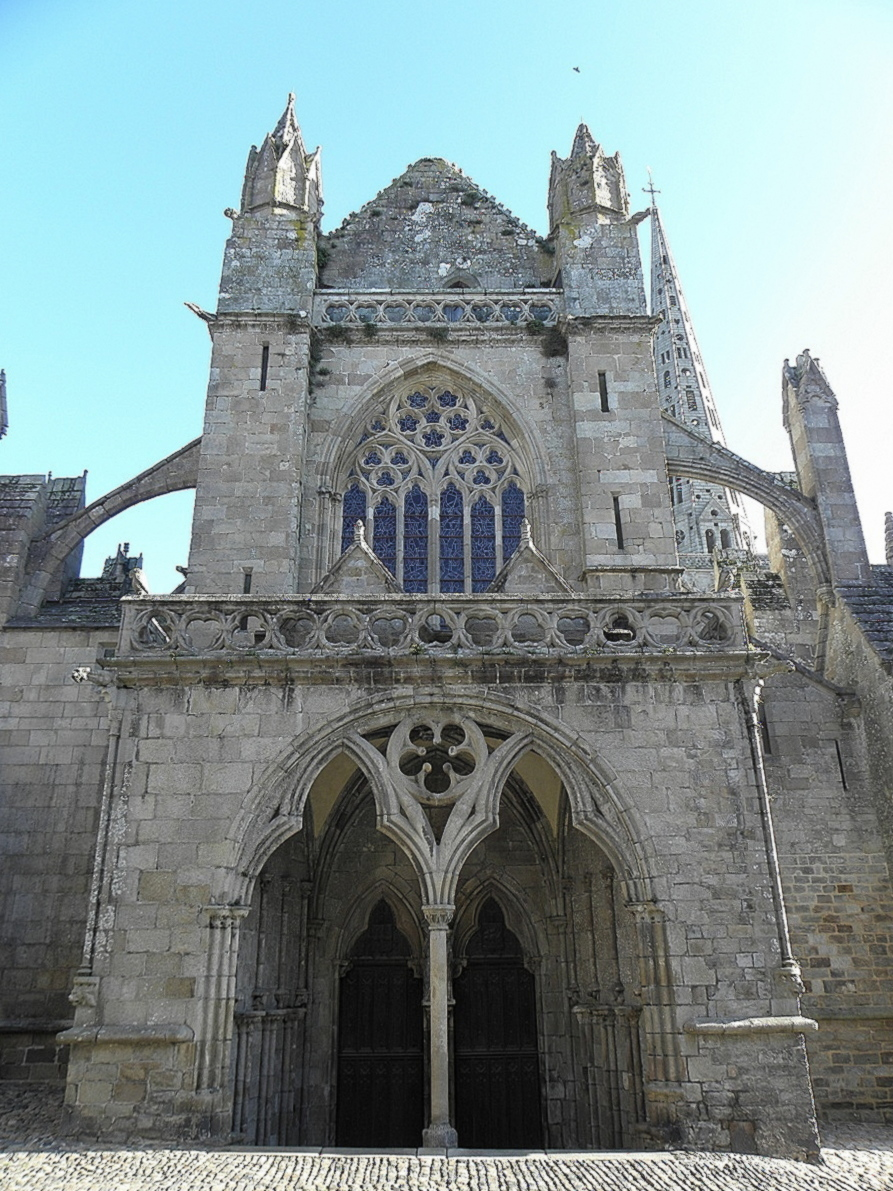
The West Porch with balcony and a small two gabled roof.

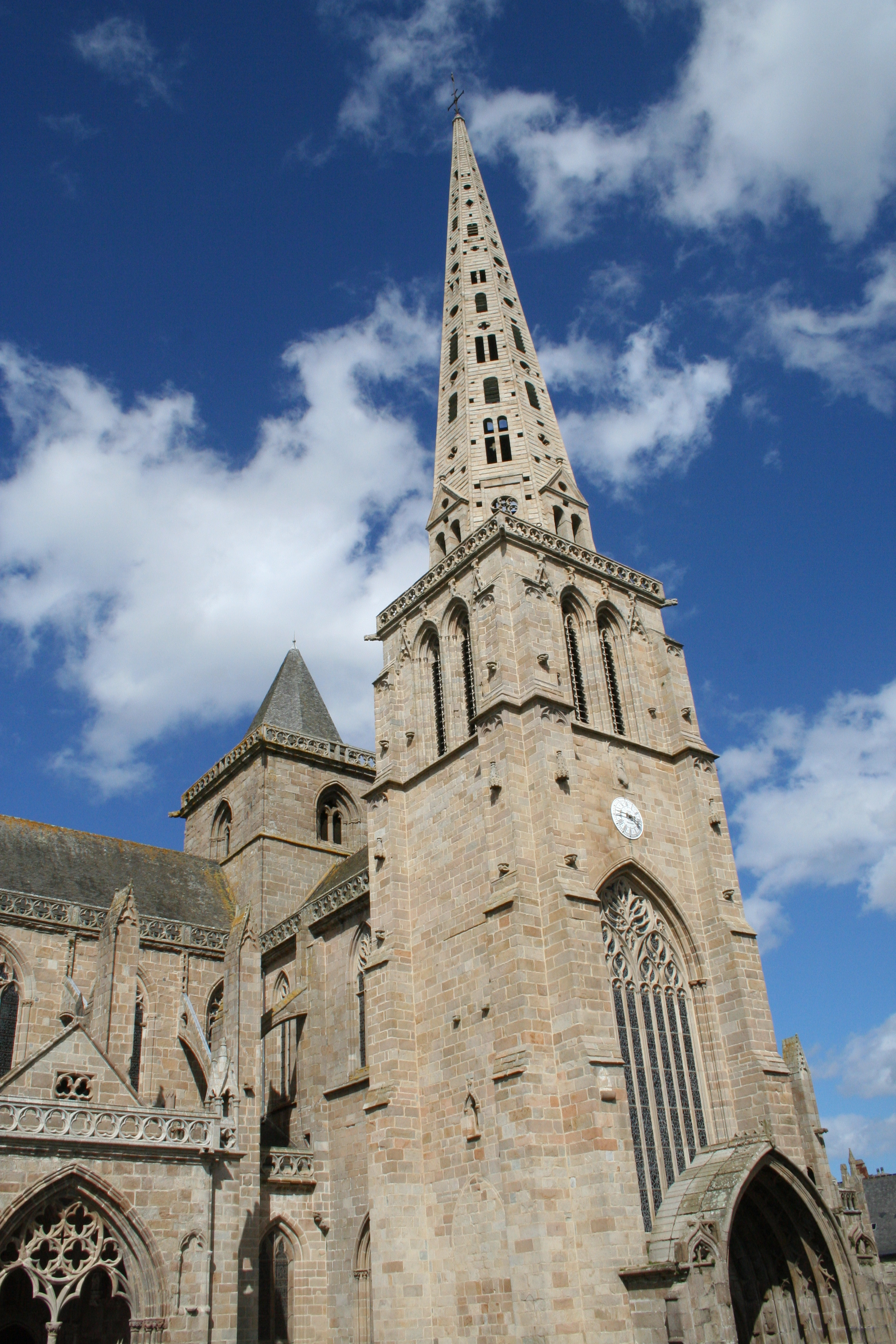
View of the clock tower and the "Sanctus" tower behind.

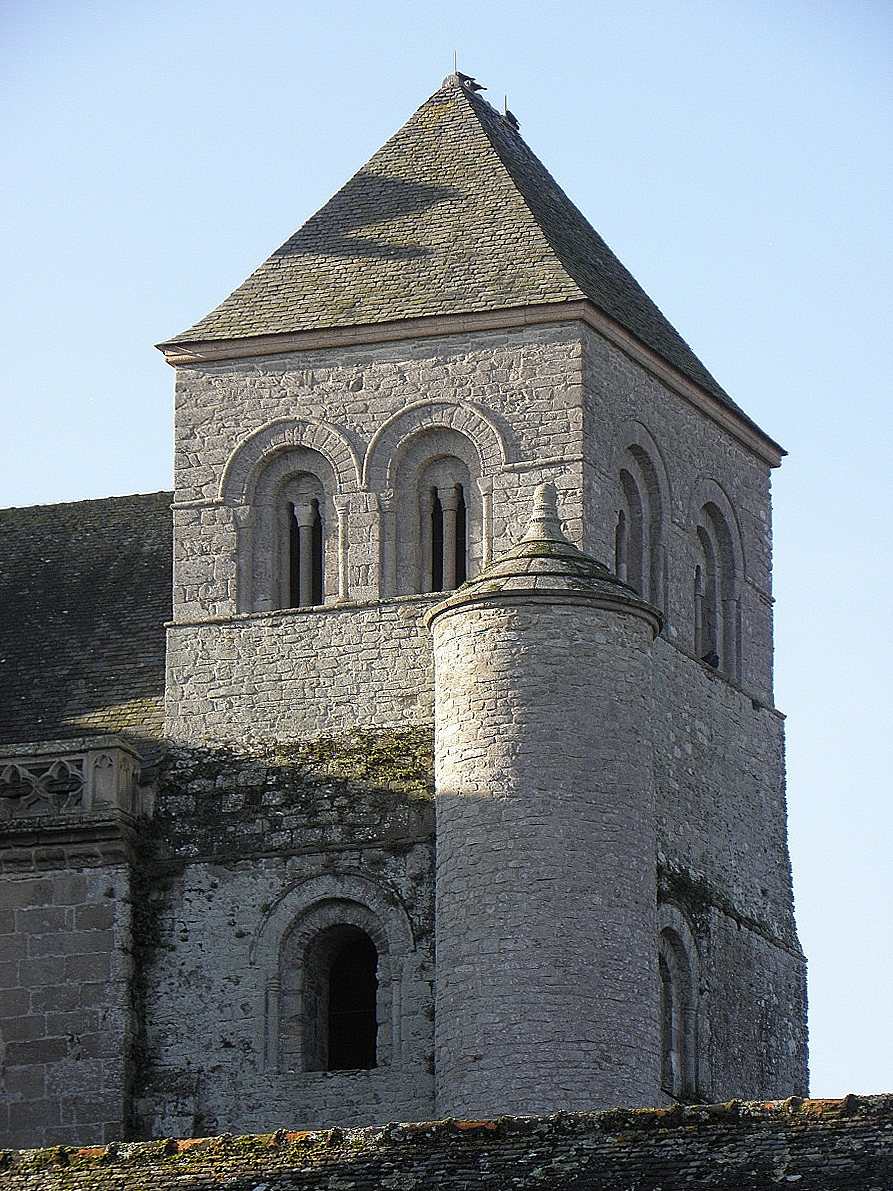
View of the three-story Romanesque style "Hastings" tower.

=== Porches ===
The cathedral has three porches. That on the western side is the "porche des lépreux". Originally this would have served as an entrance for lepers. From this porch the building is accessed by two doors with the trumeau being a 15th-century sculpture of the Virgin Mary. The left side door's tympanum contains the coat of arms of the Kermartins of which family Saint-Yves was a member. The other two porches are on the cathedral's south facing side. The "porche des cloches" opens up from the south transept and the "porche du peuple" is in the centre of the south façade of the nave. The "Le porche du peuple" also has double doors leading into the cathedral. The porch entrance has a magnificent tympanum. The "porches des Cloches" is the main entrance to the building and here the trumeau is a statue of Notre Dame de la Clarté. Above the porch is a large window. The keystone in the porch vaulting bears the coat of arms of Bishop Pierre Piedru and the date 1434.

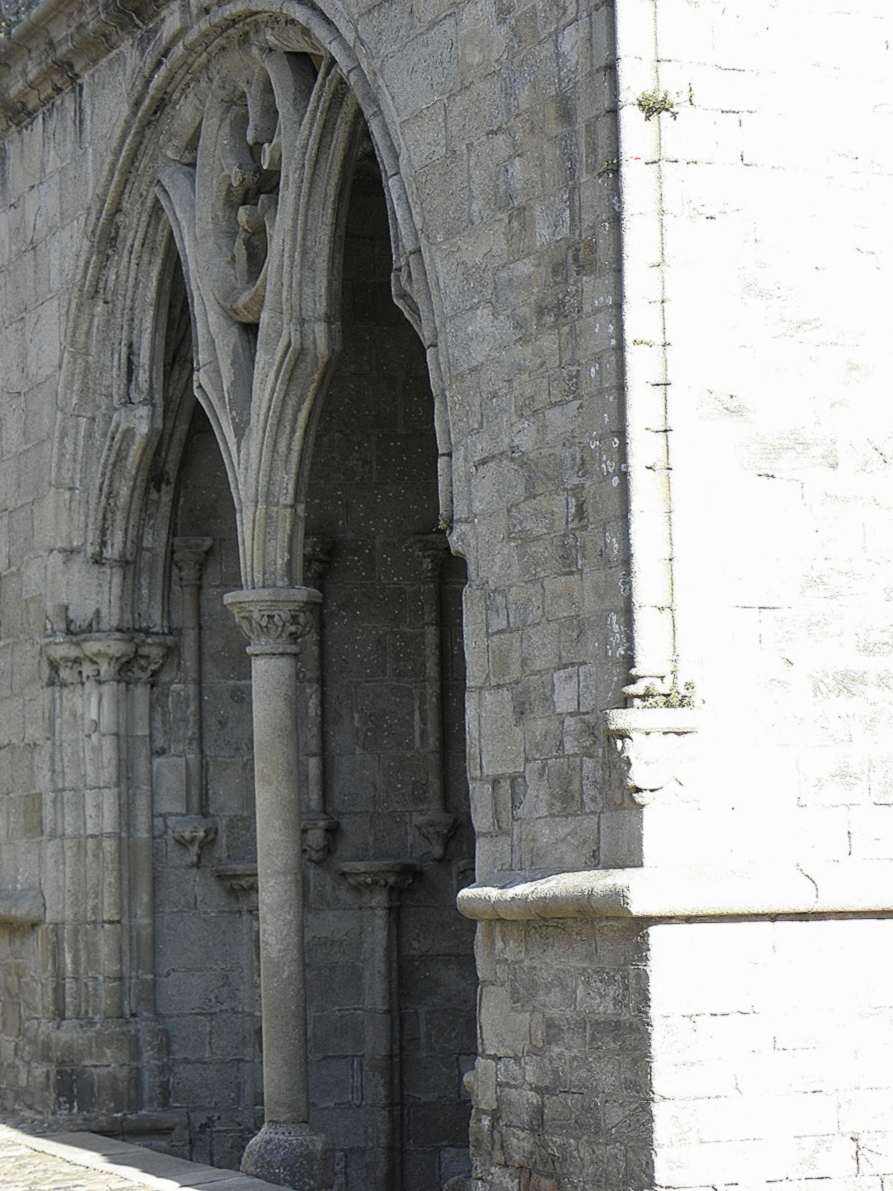
The west porch.

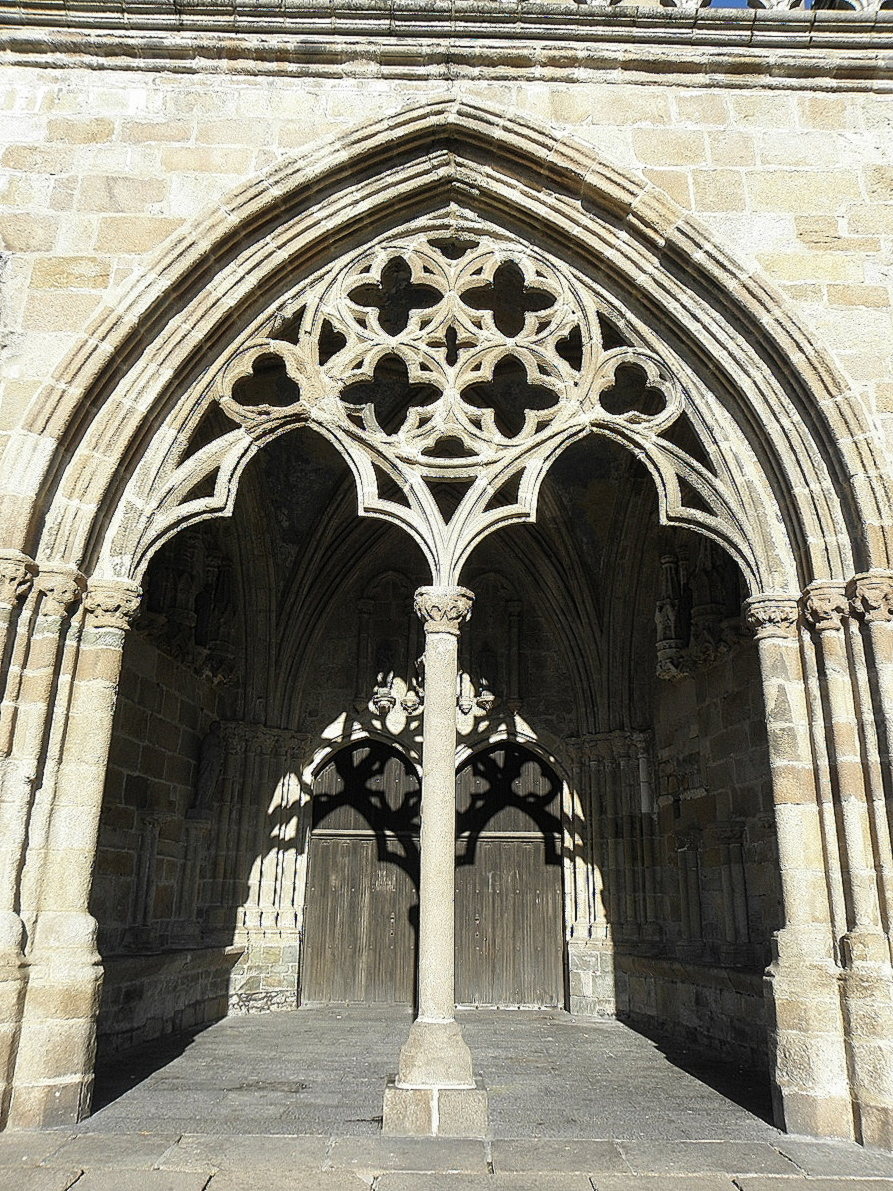
"Le porche du peuple" on the south side of the cathedral. The porch leads to a double-doored entrance to the cathedral and the side walls are decorated with statues of the Evangelists and others. Note the elaborate rosace at the top of the porch's supporting colonnette.

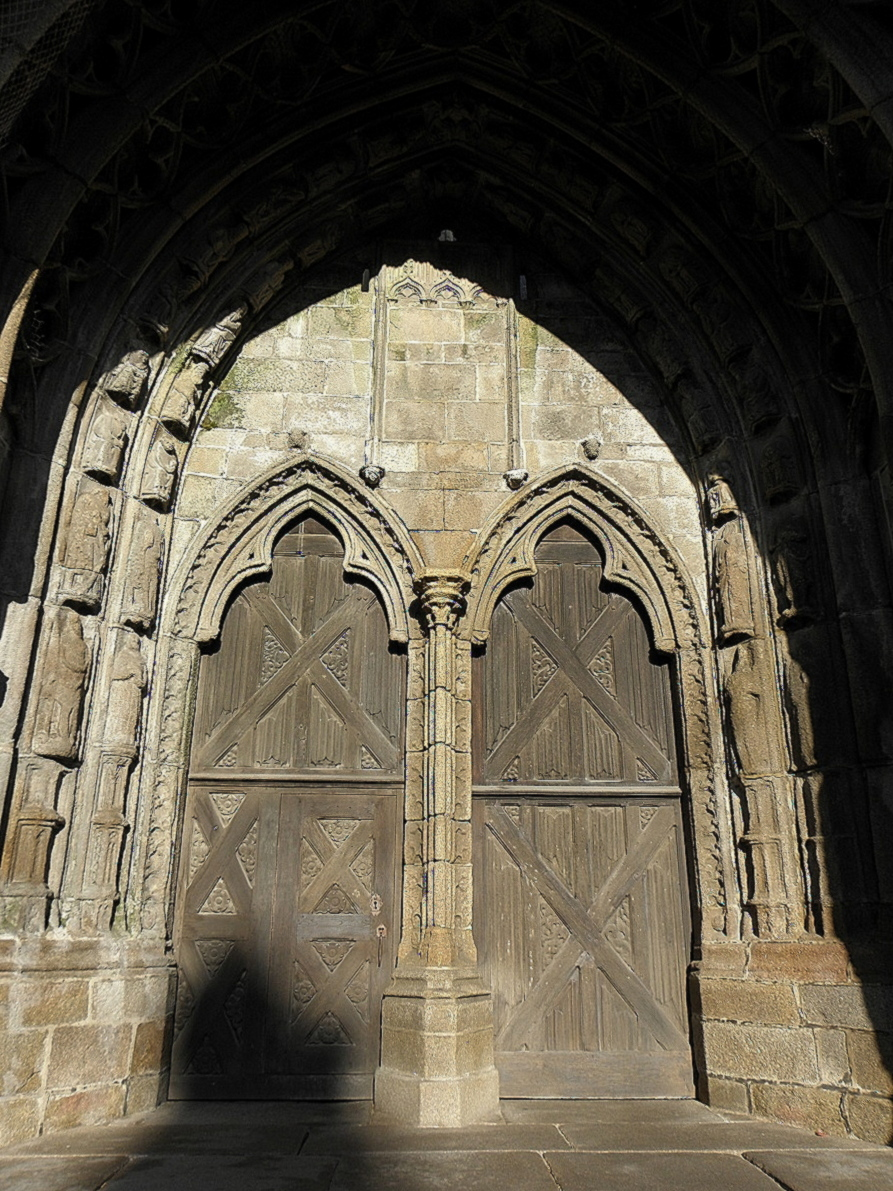
"Le porche des cloches". The largest of the three porches, was built almost 100 years after the porche du peuple and is today the main entrance into the cathedral. The voussoirs are decorated with two rows of statuettes, comprising some 40 in total, these depicting characters from the Old Testament including King David playing the harp.

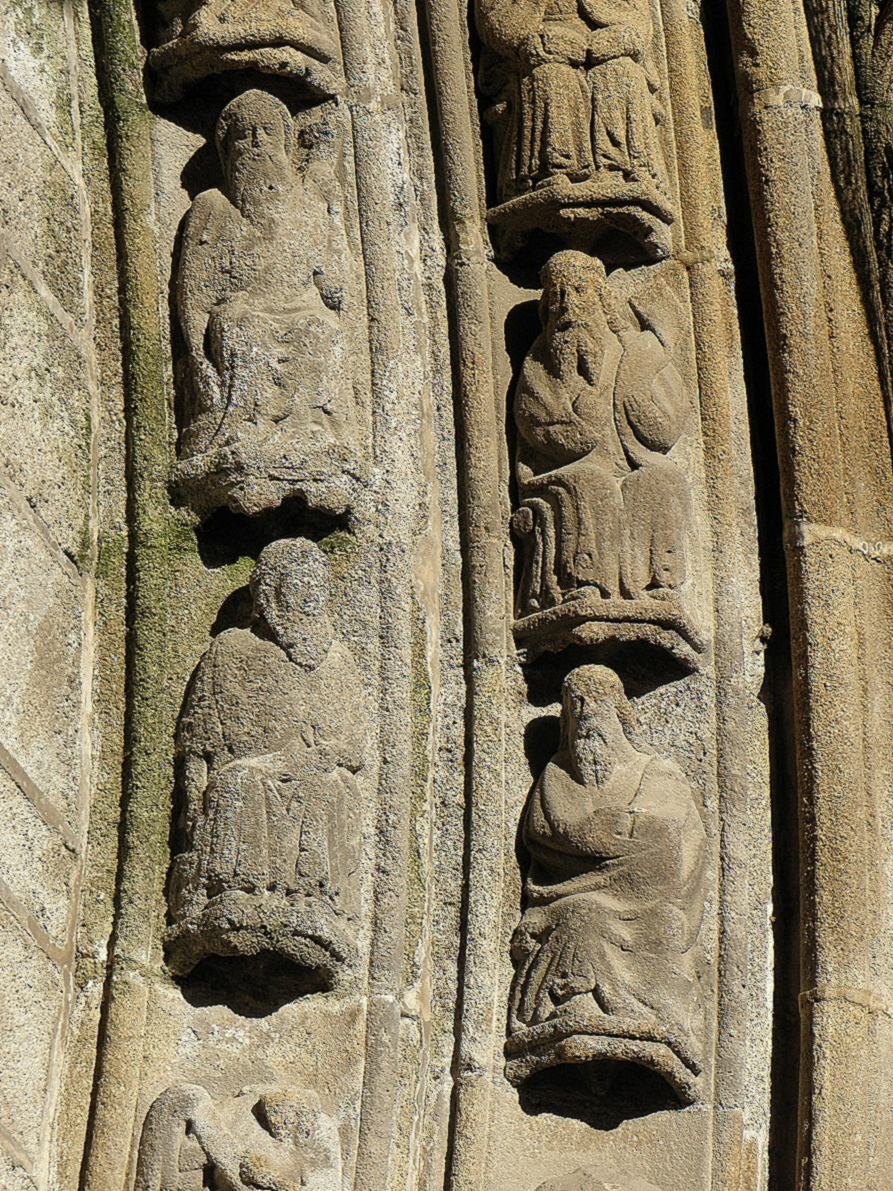
The voussoirs decorating the arch of the "porche des cloches".

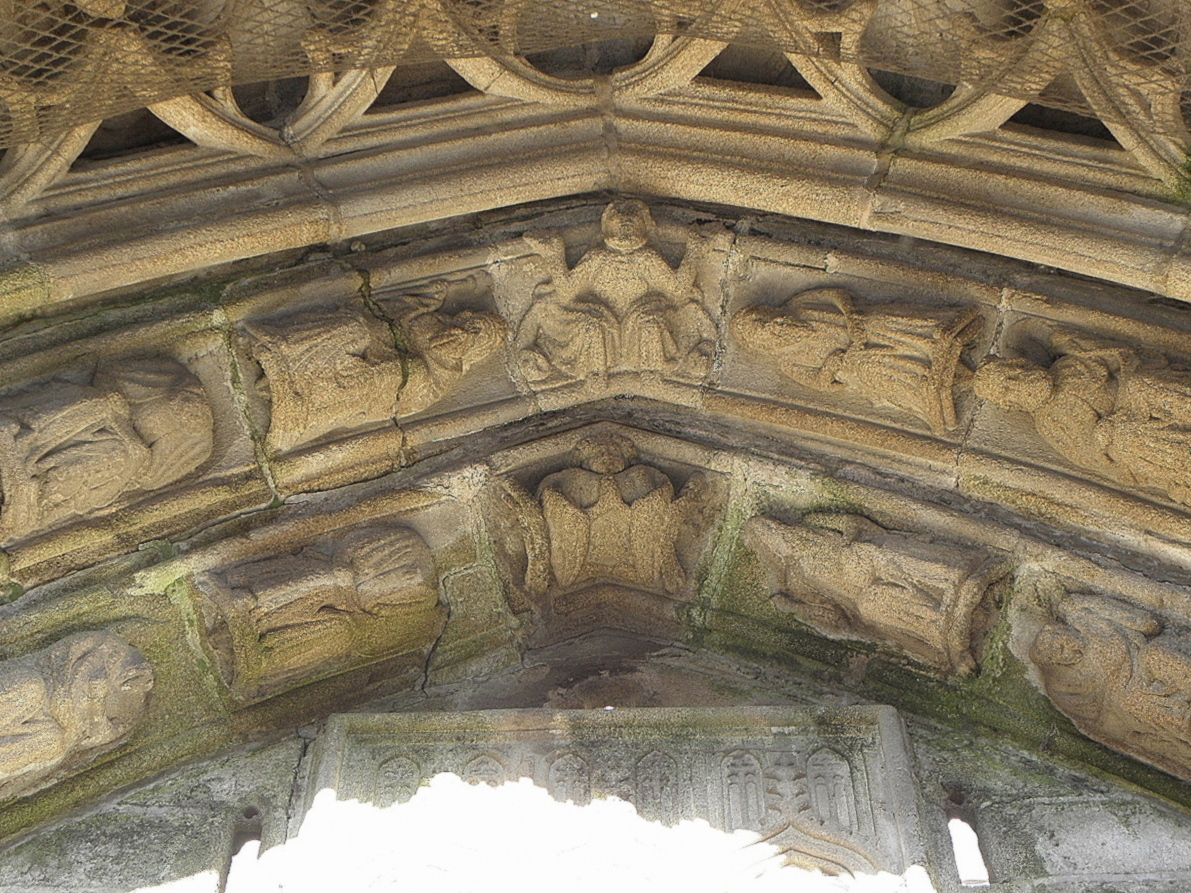
Another view of the voussoirs decorating the arch of the "porche des cloches".

== The cathedral interior ==
=== The nave ===
The walls of the nave follow Gothic convention and are made up of three distinct levels. At ground level are grand arcades and above these are the triforium and finally above this high windows or Clerestory. The Tréguier nave has seven crossings and is flanked by two collateral aisles. A sculpted frieze runs under the triforium. At the top of the nave's pillars are various carvings; people at prayer and a selection of grotesques. The nave pillars vary in thickness and at the junction of the nave and the transept the pillars are made up of several smaller columns ("Faisceau de colonnes").

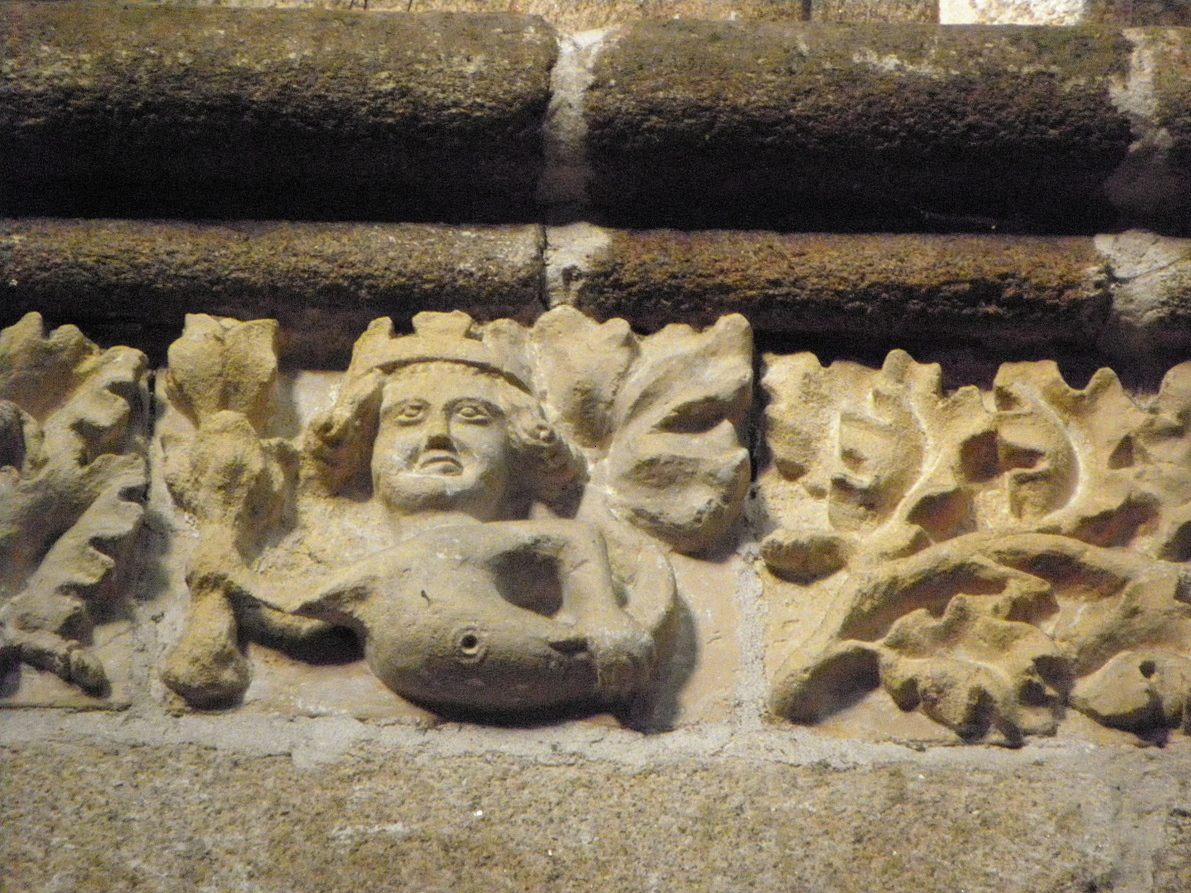
Part of the frieze running around the nave and under the triforium

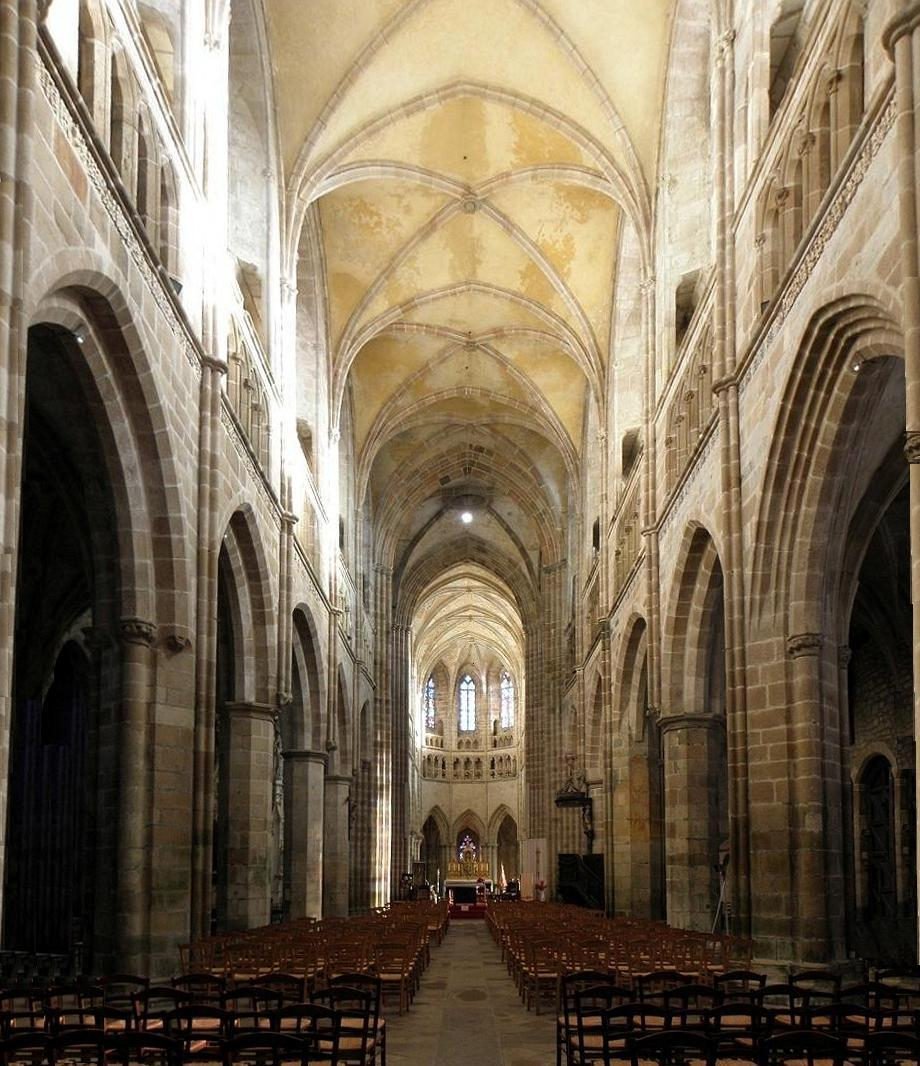
View of the nave. Note typical gothic elevation; grand arcades, triforium and high windows above. Note the vaulted ceiling. The choir can be seen in the distance

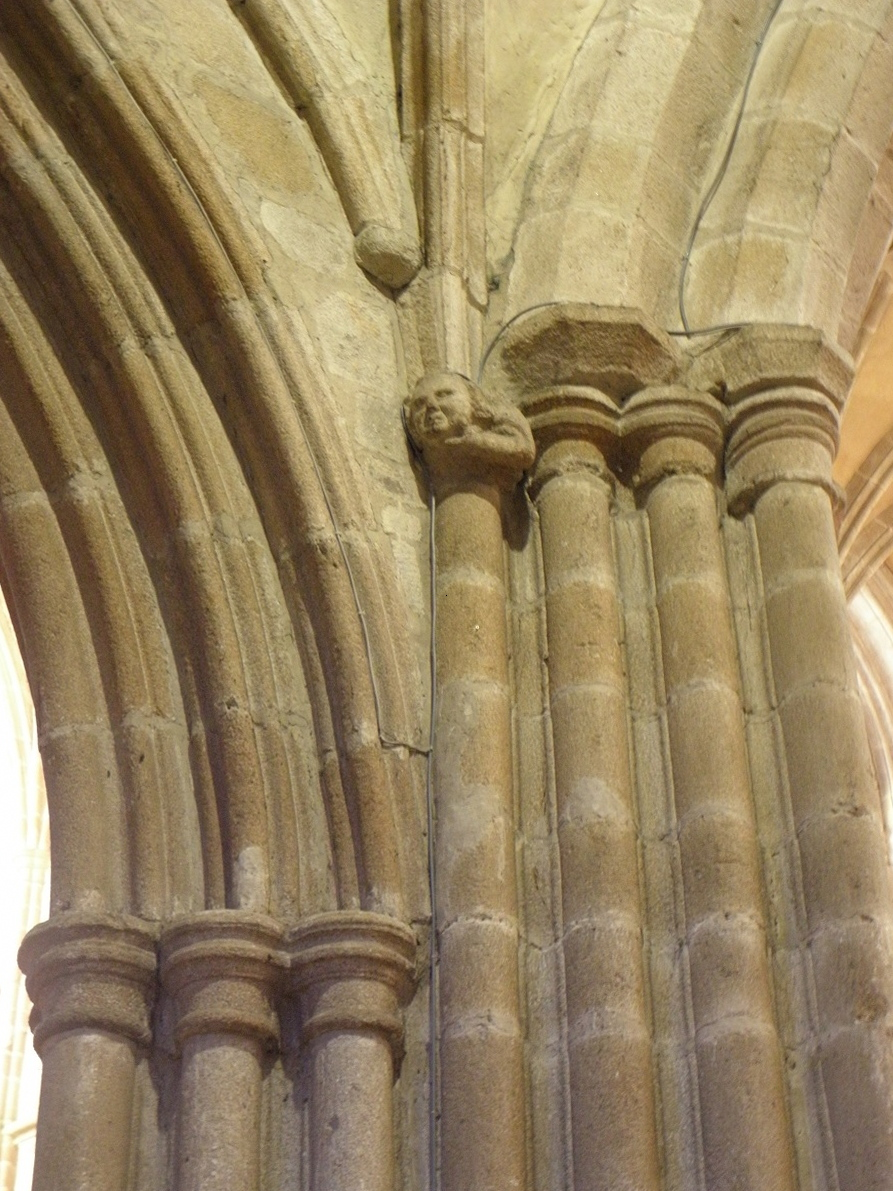
The pillar at the junction of nave and transept. An example of the ""Faisceau de colonnes" type of pillar

In the aisles to the left and right of the nave there are many enfeus or walled-up tombs of knights and clerics all sadly mutilated during the French revolution. One such tomb is that of Jehan de Lantillac dating to 1461. There are several statues decorating the nave; a wood carving of Sainte Barbara, statues of Saints Paul and Peter which came from the Chapelle Saint-Yves at Plesidy and a depiction of Christ tied against a column.

At the top of each pillar in the cathedral nave are carvings of the heads of animals, grotesques or people.

=== The choir ===
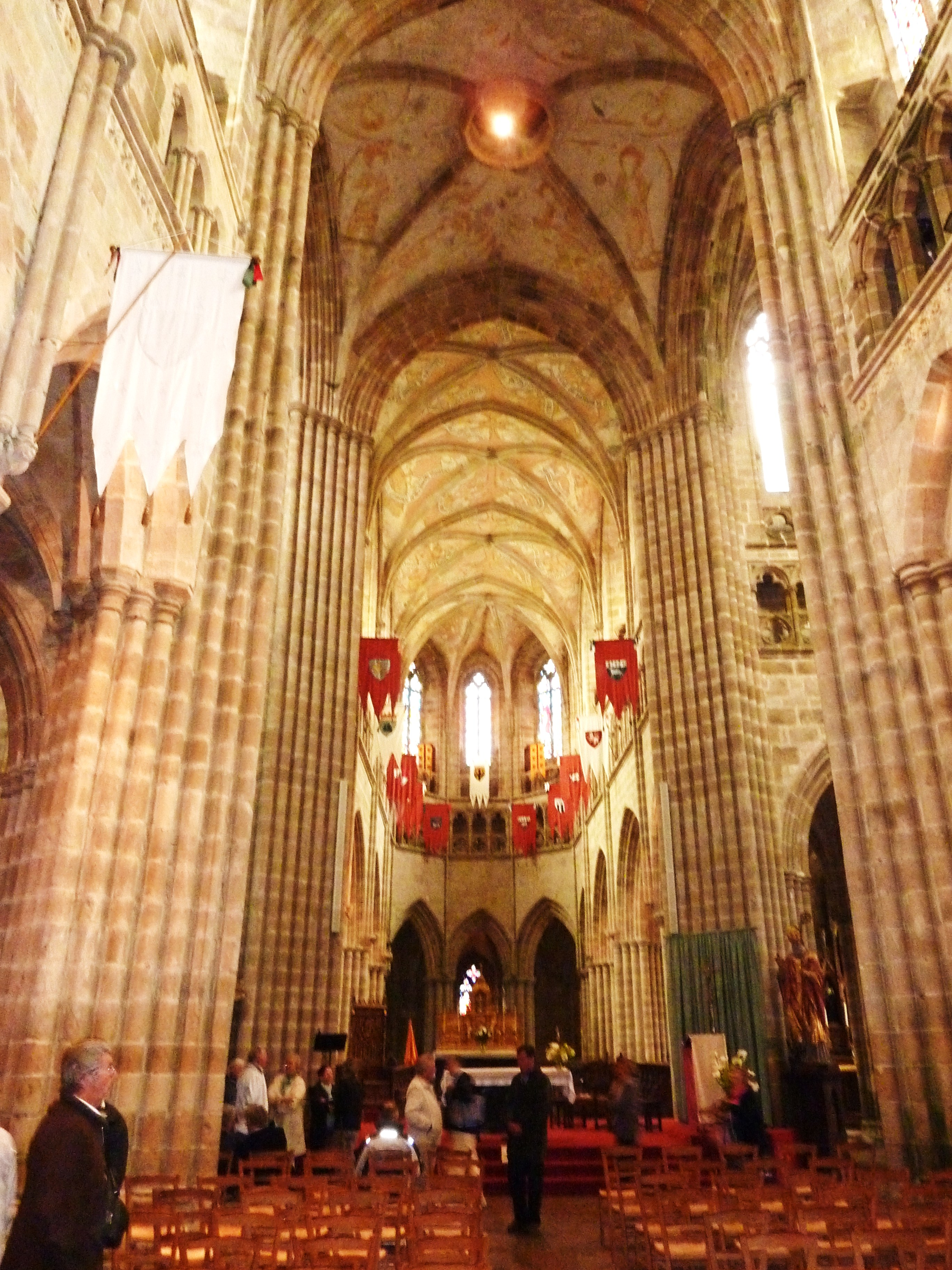
View of the choir as seen from the nave

This area of the cathedral dates from the end of the 14th century to the beginning of the 15th century. It is a little larger than the nave and again has arcades, with a balustraded triforium above and windows higher up. The choir vaulting is decorated with 15th-century paintings of angels holding banners inscribed with liturgical texts.; "Glora laus et honor tibi sit", "Gratias agamus", "Cantate Domino", etc. At the entrance to the choir there are two statues, one of Saint Tugdual and the other of Saint Yves.

=== Depictions of Saint Yves. ===
Around the area of the "Tour des Cloches" is a wooden carved panel showing John of Patmos writing the apocalyptic Book of Revelation. There is also a copy of a Murillo painting of Jesus and John the Baptist and a statue depicting Saint Yves between a poor and a rich man.

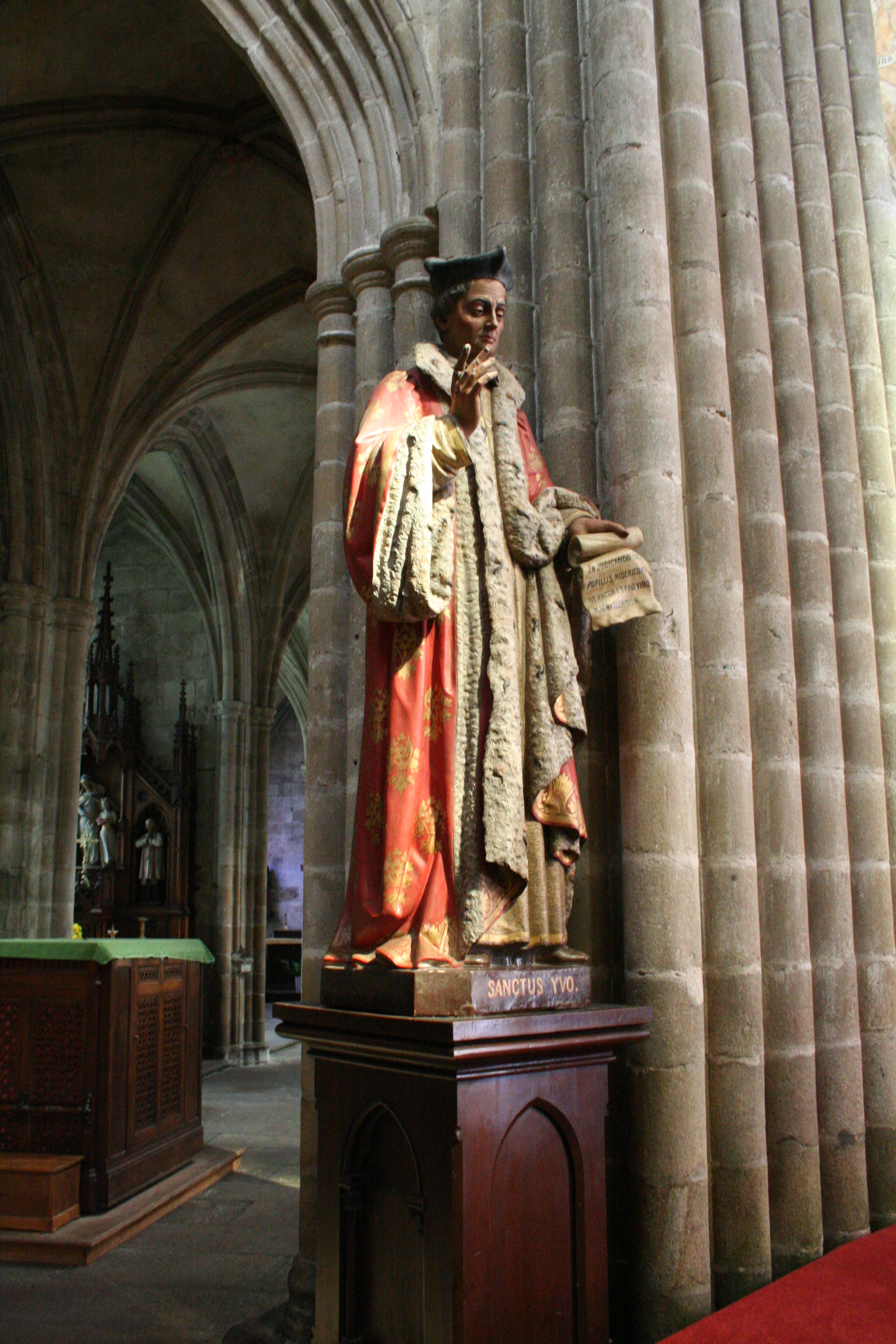
Statue of Saint Yves in the choir area.

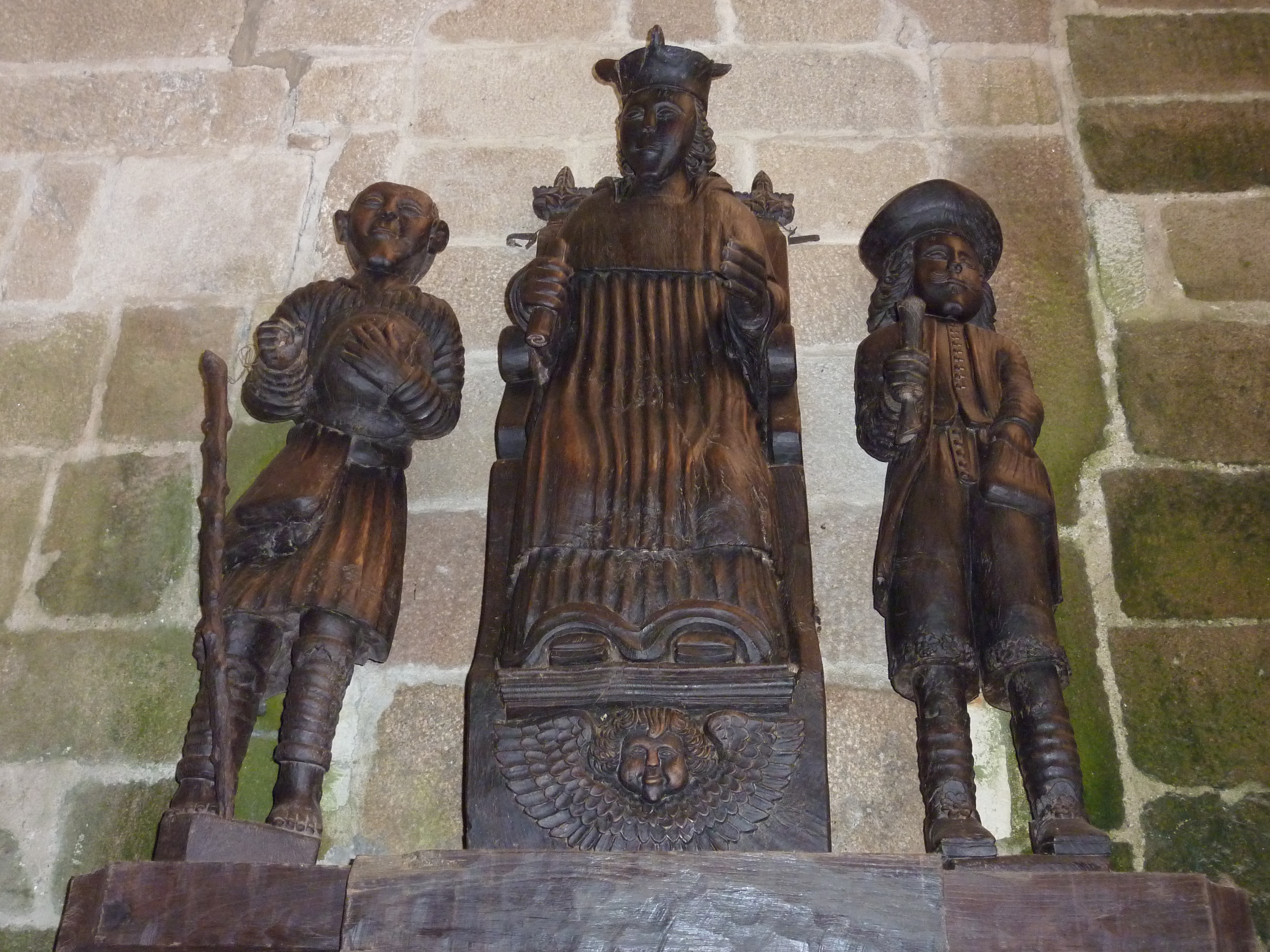
Saint Yves sat between a rich man and a poor man

=== The Gallery organ and organ casing ===
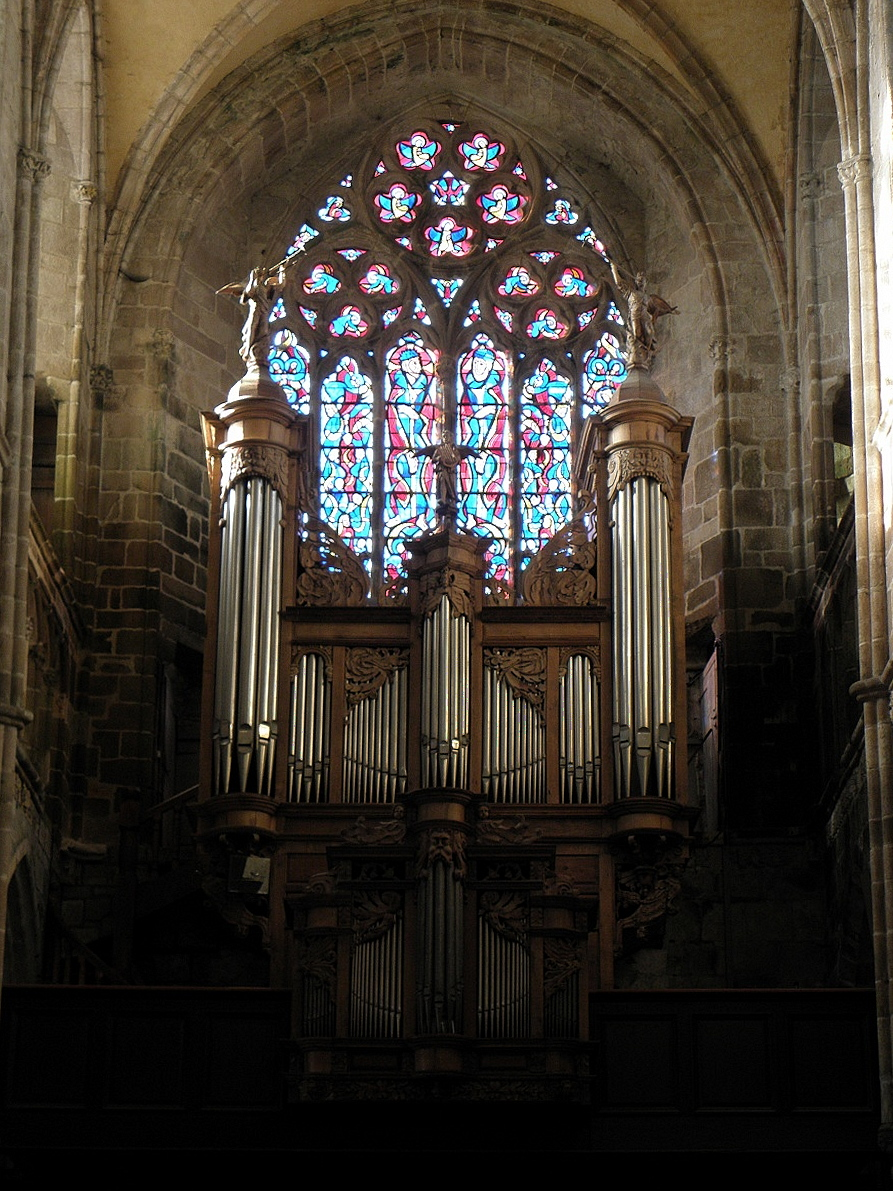
The great organ

The gallery organ and casing dates to the 17th century and is placed before the great west window. It came to the cathedral from the cistercian abbey at Bégard being purchased for the cathedral by the Tréguier curate Durand. The instrument was built between 1647 and 1649 by Pierre Thuau who was a pupil of Paul Maillard. It was restored by Herland between 1835 and 1837. Herland came from Guerlesquin. In 1937 a major refit was organised by Roethingers of Strasbourg. The wooden casing itself is thought to be by H. Vaignon from Normandy.

=== Portraits of previous bishops ===
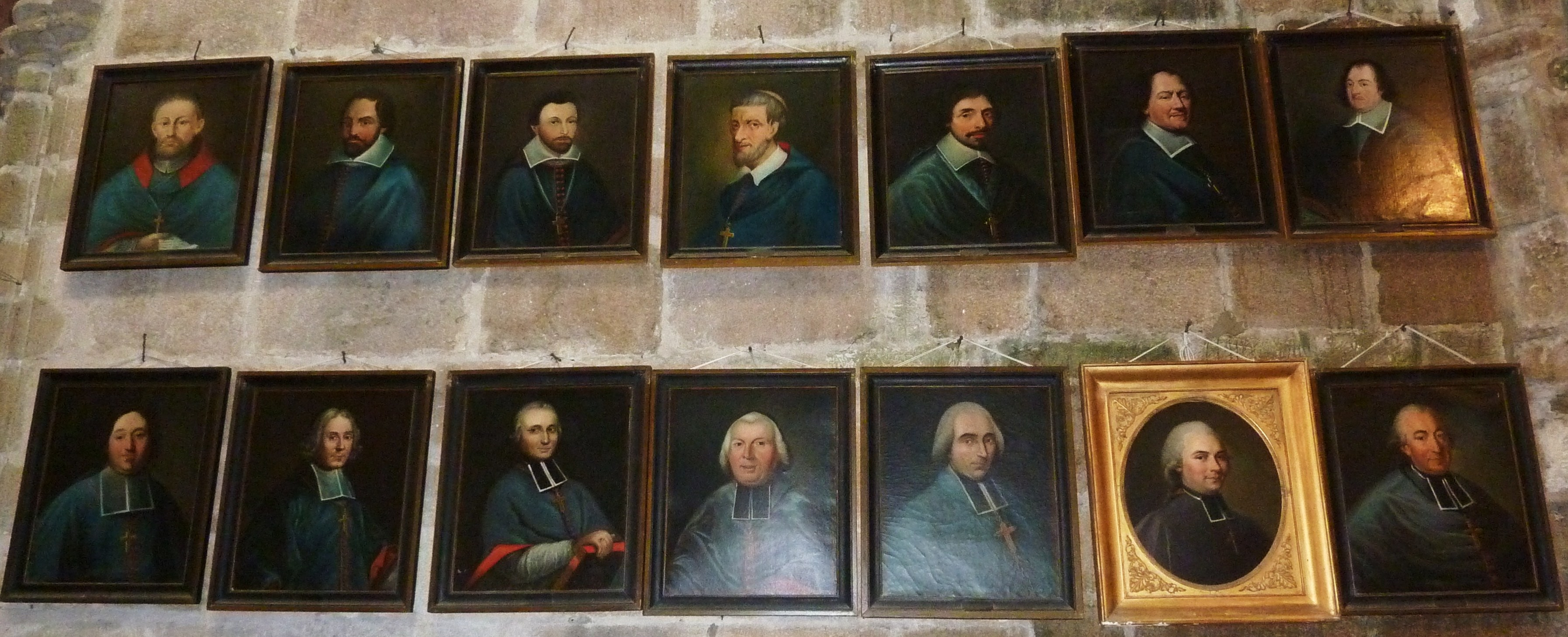
Portraits of Tréguier bishops

On the cathedral wall under the Hastings tower are oil paintings of the 14 Tréguier bishops from 1587 to 1801 when the Tréguier bishopric was merged with that of Saint Brieuc.

The bishops are:—

- Augustin René Louis le Mintier. Bishop of Tréguier from 1780 to 1801.
- Jean-Baptiste Joseph de Lubersac. Bishop of Tréguier from 1775 to 1780.
- Jean Marc de Royere. Bishop of Tréguier from 1767 to 1772.
- Joseph de Cheylus, Bishop of Tréguier from 1762 to 1766.
- Charles le Borgne de Kermorvan. Bishop of Tréguier from 1745 to 1762.
- François Hyacinthe de la Fruglais de Kerver. Bishop of Tréguier from 1731 to 1745.
- Olivier Jegou de Kervilio. Bishop of Tréguier from 1694 to 1731.
- Eustache le sénéchal de Carcado. Bishop of Tréguier from 1686 to 1694.
- François de Baglion de Salliant. Bishop of Tréguier from 1679 to 1686.
- Balthazar Grangier. Bishop of Tréguier from 1646 to 1679.
- Noël Deslandes. Bishop of Tréguier from 1635 to 1645.
- Guy Champion de Cicé de la Chaise, Bishop of Tréguier from 1620 to 1635.
- Pierre Cornulier. Bishop of Tréguier from 1613 to 1619.

Guillaume du Halgouet de Kergrese. Bishop of Tréguier from 1587 to 1602.

=== Stalls ===
The cathedral has a total of 46 stalls many elaborately carved. They date to around 1508 and were the work of Gérard Dru and Tugdual Kergus. The first stall carries a depiction of Saint Tugwaul fighting a dragon and Saint Yves about to cross a stream where an angel has caused the waters to part, affording Yves a dry crossing point.

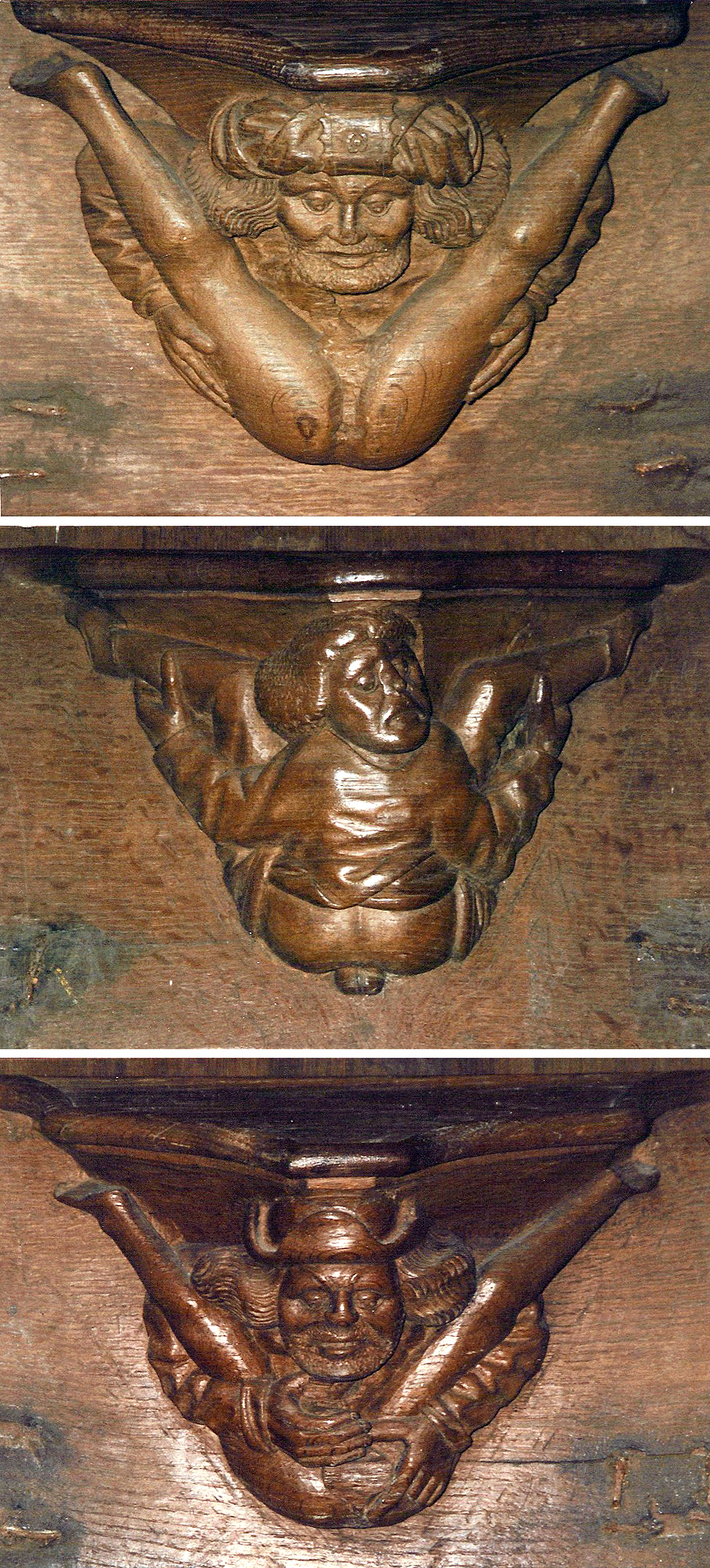
Three examples of carvings on the Tréguier stalls.

=== The High Altar and pulpit ===
The predella dates to the 19th century and is by Merer. In front of the altar, there is a Flemish altarpiece dating to the 15th century. This altarpiece is one of the oldest in Brittany and in seven separate panels over 100 people are depicted in scenes enacting the passion of Christ. The cathedral has a fine 18th-century pulpit carved from wood. Carvings include a variety of angels and an image of Christ.

== The Cloisters ==
The cloisters form an irregular quadrangle of 46 bays with two entrances/exits and abut the former bishop's palace. Each bay has an arch divided into two parts by a colonnette and at every third bay there is a flying buttress. The cloisters date to between 1640 and 1668 and were mostly built during the bishopric of Jean de Ploeuc. The "Maître d'oeuvres" involved in the construction were Pierre le Tirrant and Roland le Besque, the carpentry was by Yvon Cogan and Pierre Nicholay and the granite used came from either the quarries of the Île Grande or from Pluzunet. In 1920, the Musėe archėoloogique of Saint-Brieuc placed several additional gisant along the cloisters' walkways, these of noble knights holding their swords, abbots holding the cross, cantors with their batons and one depicting a noblewoman called Jeanne. These gisant had been originally held in local chapels which had been destroyed.

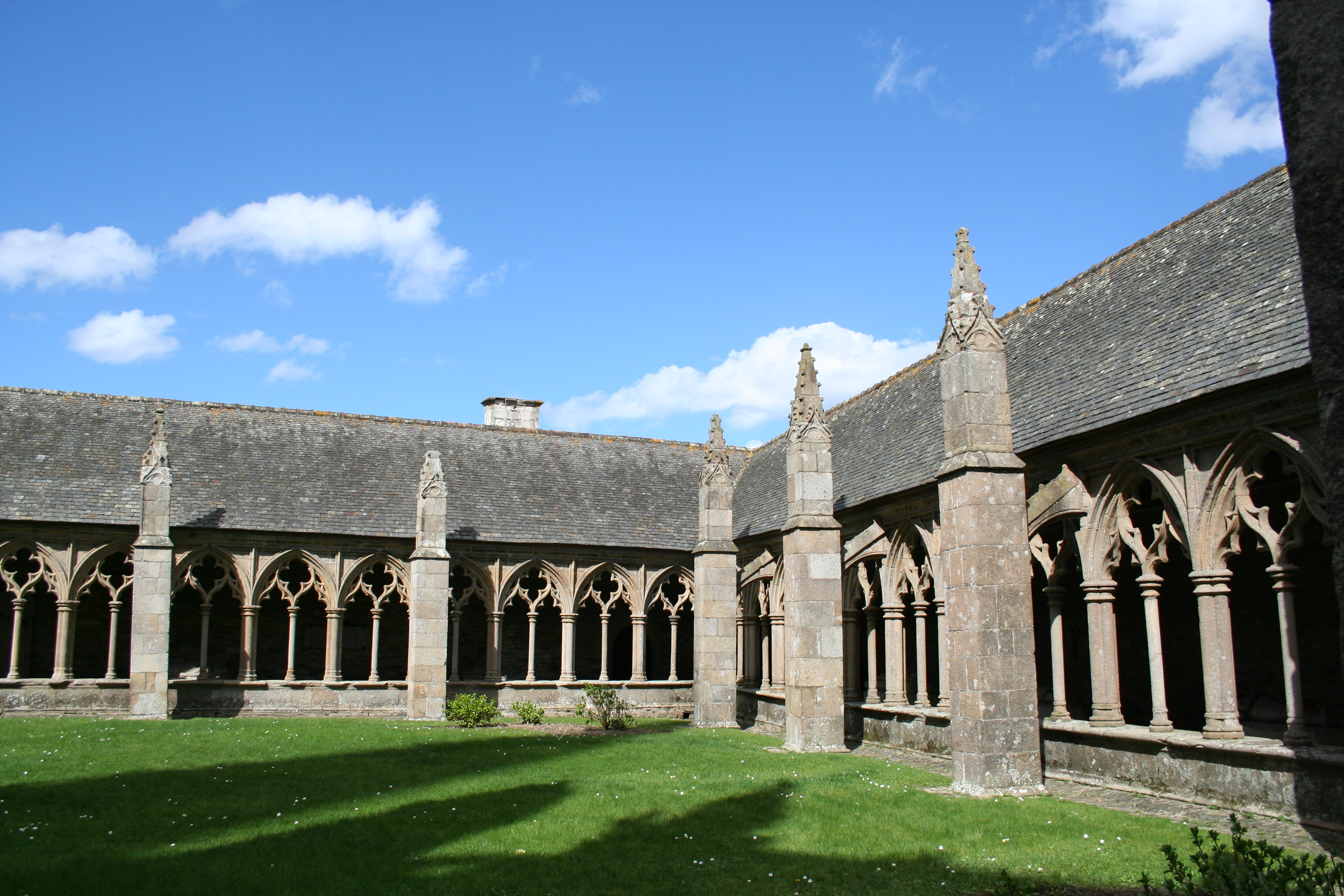
View of the cloisters

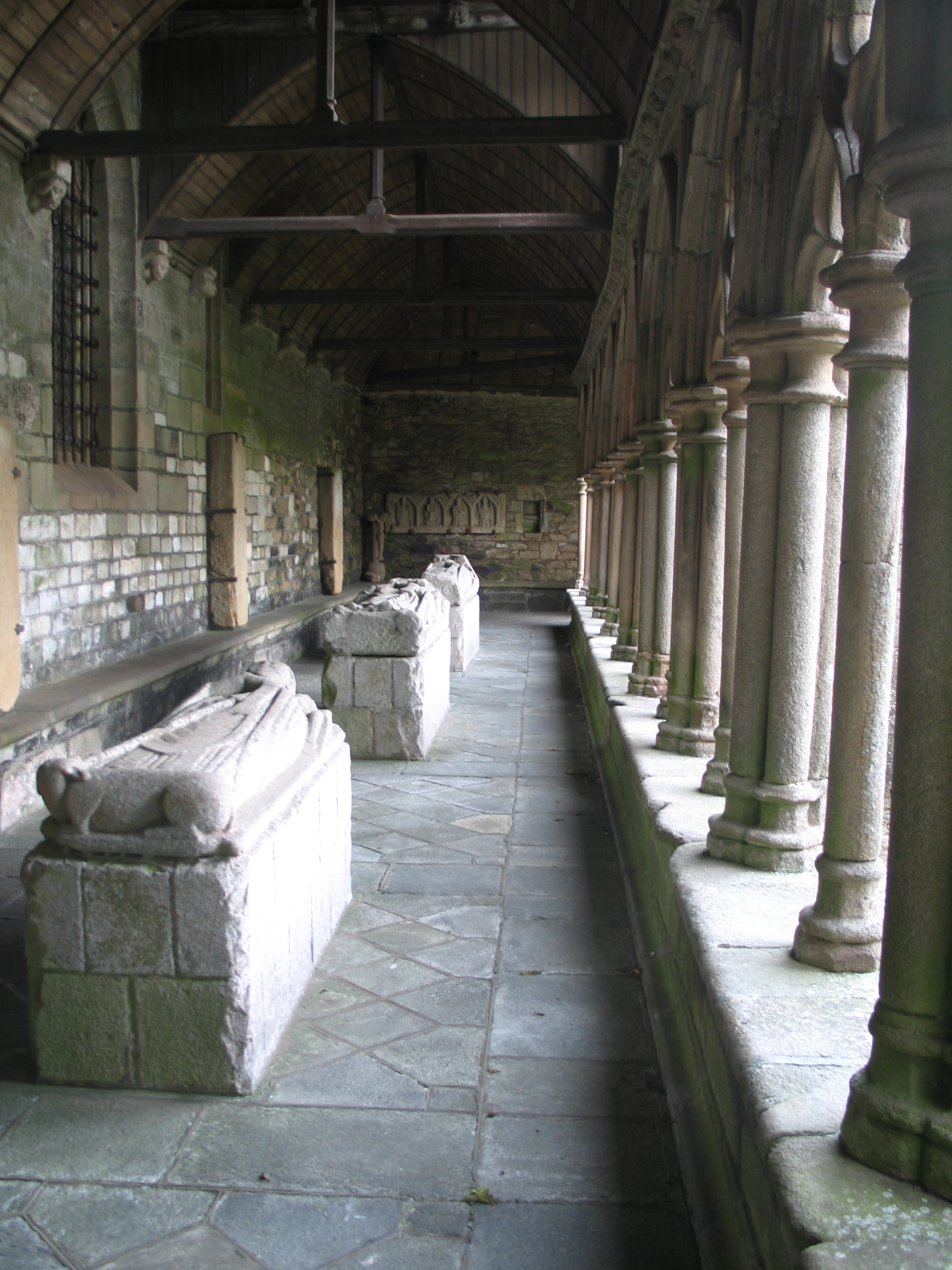
A row of gisants in the west aisle of the cathedral cloisters

Three of the gisant given to the cathedral by the Musėe archėoloogique of Saint Brieuc are described in Emmanuelle Le Seac'h's book "Sculpteurs sur Pierre en Basse-Bretagne. These are two gisants for members of the Bréhant family and another for a member of the Bois-Boissel family. These gisant came from the old Ėglise Saint-Michel in Saint-Brieuc. In earlier times the cloisters were opened up for use by local merchants as a market place.

=== Statues ===
Originally the cathedral contained numerous statues and treasures, but two events saw these drastically reduced. In 1632, a fire ravaged the sacristry, destroying many capes and chalices, and on 4 May 1794, the day Madame Taupin was guillotined in the main square, a battalion of the Revolutionary Army ran riot through the cathedral breaking statues, the tombs of Jean V and Saint Yves and damaging enfeu, porch statuary, wood carvings, furnishings and windows. The statues now occupying the cathedral were gathered together in the 19th century from various parish churches and chapels in the region.

== Tombs ==
The cathedral contains many enfeu, tombs, gisant and funerary fragments. Several notables are buried beneath the floor in the choir area including Bishop Jean de Ploeuc, Bishop Jean de Coetquis, Bishop Hugues de Coatredrez, Bishop Jean Calloët, Bishop Adrien d'Amboise, Bishop Champion de Cicé, Bishop Balthazar Grangier, Bishop Jegou de Kerlivio, Bishop François de la Fruglaye, and Bishop Le Borgne de Kermorval. These include:-

- Tombstone in the shape of a keystone. This granite tombstone dates to 1340. The inscription is only partly legible reading "CI GISTE G. GIEMBLY, MORFOICE LAN de GRACE M CCCGVARANGE A ROVA". The tombstone came from the priory of Saint-Pierre in Matignon.
- The tomb of a priest. This granite tomb dates to the 14th century and was discovered in 1863 in the cemetery of the Saint-Pierre priory at Matignon.
- The gisant of Guy le Lionnais, Abbot of Beaulieu. This granite tomb is reckoned to date between 1477 and 1517. Guy le Lionnais was also the canon of Rennes.
- The tomb of Pierre de Chabucet, Canon of Saint-Brieuc. This granite tomb executed in around 1473 has the following incomplete epitaph "HIC JACET MAGISTER PETRUS de CHABUCET CAN (ONICUS) BRIOCE (ESIS) et ... QUI OBIT ANNO (DOMINI) M CCCC LXXIII ORATE (PRO) EO."
- The tomb of Guy Eder, Bishop of Saint-Brieuc. This 1431 granite tomb is inscribed with the epitaph "HIC IACET BO (NAE) ME (MORIAE) G (UY) EDER (EPISCOPUS) BRIOCEN (SIS) QUI OBIIT XXIII DECEMBRIS ANNO (DOMINI) M^{o} CCCC^{o} XXI ORATE PRO EO". Eder was the Bishop of Saint-Brieuc from 1428 to 1431
- The tomb of an unidentified Rohan seigneur. The cathedral holds this tomb carved from kersanton stone and dating from around 1630 to 1650. This tomb came originally from the abbey at Bon.
- The tomb of Eon Gilbert. This tomb of the seigneur Eon Gilbert carved from granite and dating to the third quarter of the 15th century carries the inscription "CI GIST EON GILBERT JADIS SEIGNEUR de CARJEGU et DU ROST QUI TREPASSA LE III ... DU MOIS de ... MILIIII et LXIIII". Not all the text is readable hence the gaps shown
- The tomb of Guillaume Bouttier. The cathedral holds Bouttier's granite tombstone. He died in 1468 and was the abbé at Beaulieu from where the tomb came.
- The tomb of Louis or Alain de Penmarch. There is a fragment of this granite tomb kept in the cathedral. It dates to the 16th century. De Penmarch was a canon at Saint-Brieuc.
- Tombstone of Thébault de Breignon, Bishop of Saint-Brieuc. This marble tombstone dating to 1776 is broken into two pieces. De Breignon was Bishop of Saint-Brieuc from 1745 to 1776.
- The tomb of Guillaume Le Flo, abbot of Beaulieu which dates to 1427. The tomb came to the cathedral from the Abbey at Beaulieu. Guillaume Le Flo died in July 1427.
- Tombstone of Françoise Mascé. This granite tombstone dates to the 17th century and the inscription, although incomplete, reads "ANCOISSE MASCE FILLE de NOBLE GENTS GUILLAUME MASCE et IANNE MASCE et IANNE DESBOIS SIEUR et DAME ... LA COUR".
- The tomb of Oaf and his wife Elizabeth née Mortemer is particularly poignant as it includes their children Arthur, Edwige, Elizabeth, Rolph and Edmond who were all found dead on the morning of 1 November 1444.
- The tomb of Pierre de Chabucet, Canon of Saint-Brieuc' inscribed "HIC JACET MAGISTER PETRUS de CHABUCET CAN (ONICUS) BRIOCE (ESIS) et ... QUI OBIT ANNO (DOMINI) M CCCC LXXIII ORATE (PRO) EO". It was executed in around 1473.
- The granite tomb of an abbot of Beaulieu which came from Beaulieu Abbey. It dates to the first half of the 14th century.
- Also the tomb of Jean de Troguindy the Sieur of Launay, a 14th-century tomb is inscribed with the coats of arms of Coëtmen and Kerbouric and the Chastel motto "Si plet à Dieu".
- The tomb of Alain de Vitré. This granite tomb dates to around 1197 and came to the cathedral from the abbey at Beaulieu. Alain de Vitré, or de Dinan, co-founded the abbey with his uncle Rolland de Dinan. Alain de Vitré died in 1187.
- Epitaph for a noblewoman. This fragment of a tomb dating to 1680 reads ": ICY GIST DAMle FIACRE THEPAULT DAme de TREZEL DECEDEE LE 17 OCTOBRE 1680 ELLE DEMANDE VOS PRIERES".

== The south transept ==
It is from this transept that the "Tour des Cloches" rises. Also In the south transept is a large panel in wood with a relief depicting John the Evangelist at Patmos and a copy of Murillo's painting depicting Jesus and John the Baptist. There is also a sculpture depicting Saint Yves between a rich man and a poor man. The stained glass window lighting the south transept recounts the story of the Vine, a symbol of the Church, the vine passing around depictions of Brittany's seven founding saints.

=== Chapelle du Saint Sacrement or the Chapelle du Duc Jean V ===
This chapel was founded by Jean V in 1420 as the place in the cathedral where he wished to be buried. This chapel is also known as the " Chapelle Saint Yves " or the "Chœur du Duc Jean V". Jean V, Duke of Brittany had it seems made a promise in 1420 when a prisoner during the "War of Succession" that he would erect a monument to Saint-Yves and create a chapel dedicated to him. It is where the Saint Yves cenotaph is located. Jean V wished to be buried near Saint Yves. His body was placed in the chapel in 1451 and a stone indicates where his body was actually buried. The original tomb was destroyed by soldiers of the Étampes Battalion in 1794. The tomb is a superb work by the sculptor Armel Beaufils working with the architect Cornon. The west wall of the Hastings tower is, in fact, the end wall of the chapel and here there is a modern altar dedicated to the Saint Sacrement. This features Christ on the Cross with an angel on each side. The stained glass window is dedicated to Saint-Yves and depicts various aspects from his life. The chapel also holds three statuettes depicting Saint Yves. Saint-Yves died on 19 May 1303 at his manor at Kermartin in Minihy. His body was carried by priests to the cathedral where he was buried. Hundreds of people filed past his tomb, the beginning of what was to be a pilgrimage. Yves was born at Kermartin and studied both law and theology. He became a close adviser to the Tréguier bishop and rector of Trédrez and later Louannec. Saint Yves or Ivo of Kermartin is buried in Minihy-Tréguier where he was born but there is an elaborate cenotaph in the cathedral. The original monument, built by Jean V was spared by the English when they occupied Tréguier in 1345 but was destroyed in 1793 by the Étampes battalion. The present elaborate monument dates to 1890. The "Pardon of Saint Yves" is held each year in Tréguier on 19 May. The monument is located in the Duke's chapel lit by stained glass donated in 1937 by American, Belgian and French lawyers.

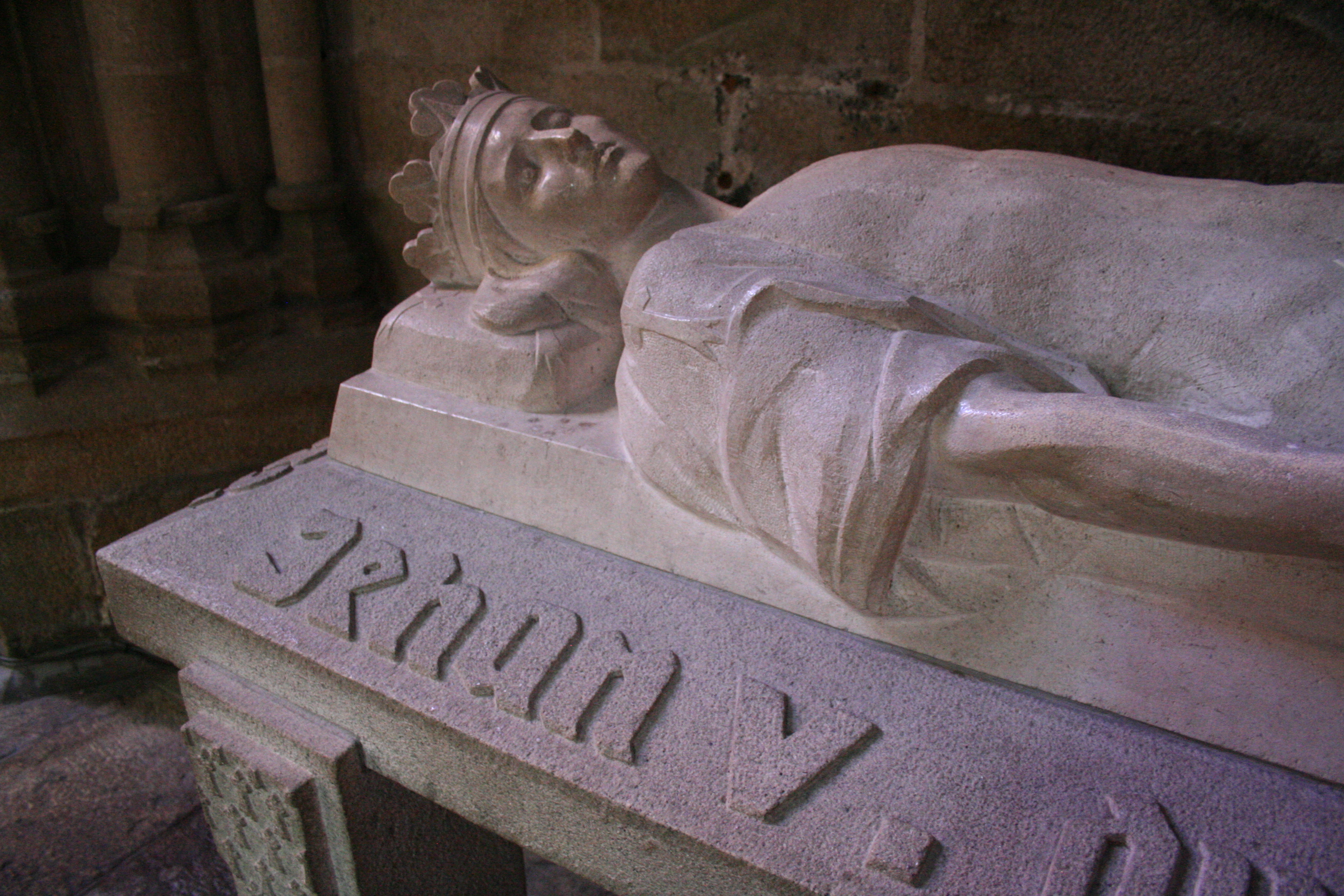
The tomb of Jean V

The windows of the Chapelle du Saint Sacrement depicting some events in Saint-Yves' life were placed here by the generosity of lawyers from various countries.

=== The Saint Yves cenotaph ===
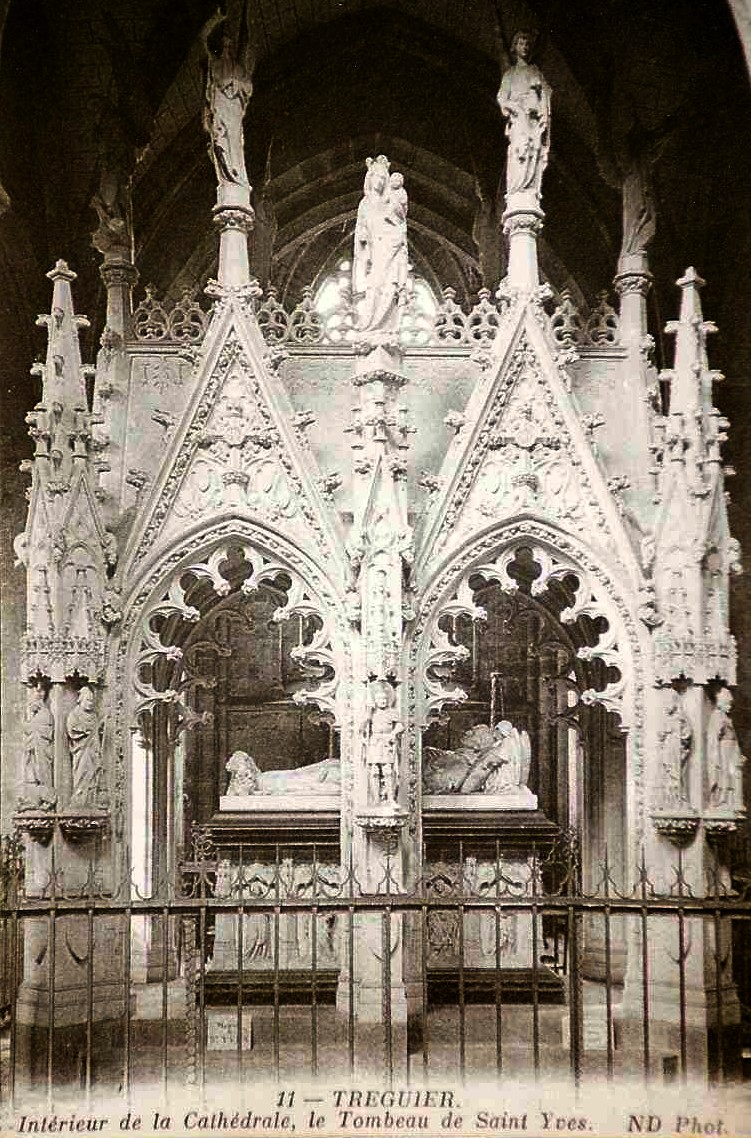
The Saint Yves cenotaph in Tréguier cathedral

Saint-Yves died on 19 May 1303, at the manor of Kermartin in Minihy and on the day of his death he was carried by the priests of Tréguier to the cathedral surrounded by an enthusiastic crowd. The next day he was buried in the nave area and this saw the start of great pilgrimages to Tréguier to pay homage to him. Yves was born in Kermartin, his father being a minor Breton noble. His mother Azo du Quinquis had a deep faith and told her son "Vivez, mons fils, de manière à devinir un saint!" (Live my son in the manner that befits a saint). For 10 years Yves studied Theology and Law in Paris and then moved to Orléans to practice civil law. He became an "official" firstly at Rennes and then Tréguier where his services were claimed by the bishop. He also became the rector of Trédrez and then of Louannec. The cathedral "Official" played an important role in judging and settling dispute whether ecclesiastical or civil. Yves also set up an asylum at Minihy. Yves de Kermartin was proclaimed as a saint in 1347. On 19 May each year, the Yves "pardon" is celebrated and the reliquary containing his skull is carried from the cathedral to Minihy by a procession of clerics and lawyers. The original Saint Yves tomb was destroyed during the French Revolution and the present monument dates to 1890. Saint Yves himself is depicting laying down supported by depictions of two angels. On the south face of the monument are depictions of Catel Autret, one of his friends Guiomar Morel, Charles de Blois in armour, Maurice, Archdeacn of Rennes and Catherine Héloury. On the south face are depictions of Yves' mother and father, Héloury and Azo, Alain de Bruc who employed Yves as a cathedral official, Cathovada and Riwalon a juggler. On the east face is a depiction of Clément VI who canonised Yves and Philippe V1 de Valois who initiated this canonization. On the west face are depictions of Monseigneur Bouché, bishop of Saint-Brieuc and Tréquier and Jean V, Duke of Brittany. At the base of the monument are the nine ancient bishops of Brittany; Saint Samson, Saint Pol, Saint Corentin, Saint Tudual, Saint Clair, Saint Melaine, Saint Patern Saint Malo and Saint Brieuc, two Kings of Brittany, Judicãel and Salomon, two martyrs Saint Donatien and Saint Rogatien and finally Saint Gildas.

== The ambulatory and various side chapels ==
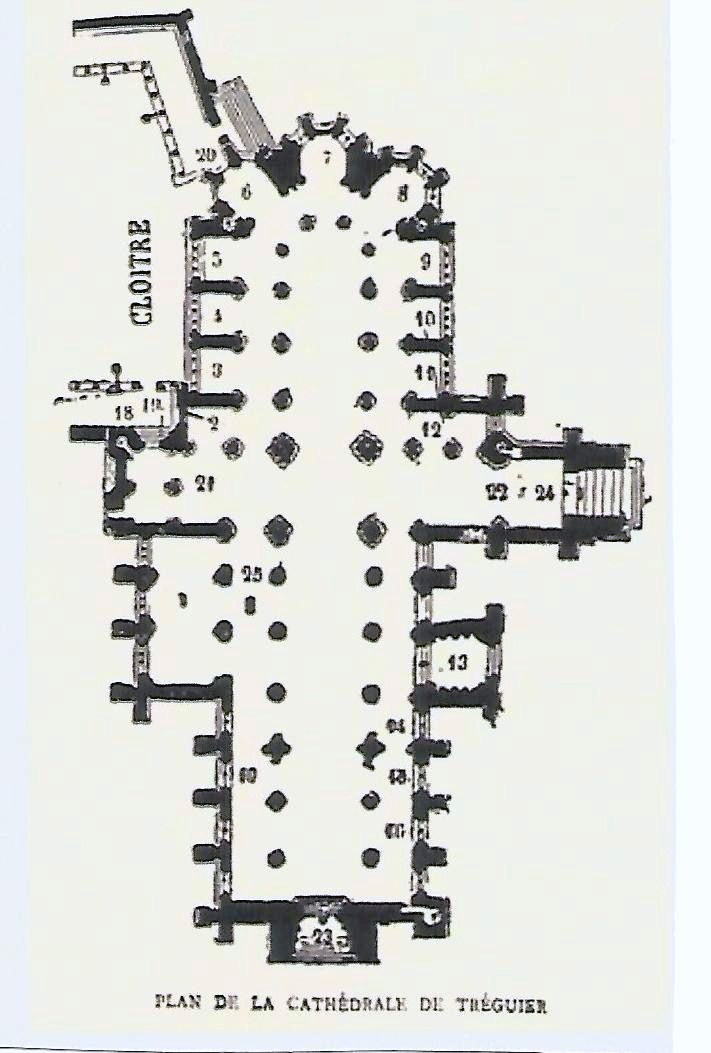
Internal plan of Treguier Cathedral

The ambulatory runs around the choir area and gives access to ten side chapels. On the north side of the choir and along the ambulatory there are three chapels, the Chapelle Sainte-Anne, the Chapelle Mont-Carmel and the Chapelle Saint-Joseph. The chapel dedicated to Sainte Anne contains an 18th-century statue of Sainte Anne and an enfeu (walled tomb) where the coat of arms is broken but the motto "S'il plait à Dieu" is still legible.

After the Chapelle Saint-Joseph we move to the three apsidal chapels, the Chapelle Sainte-Phliomèna, the Chapelle de la Sainte-Croix and the Chapelle Saint-André. All three of these chapels are pentagonal in shape. The Chapelle Sainte-Phliomèna was at one time used to access the cloisters and contains a statue of Philomena. The Chapelle de la Sainte-Croix is the cathedral's axial chapel and holds the insignia of the basilica. The chapel also holds a "pietà" in polychromed wood and a painting of Christ's descent from the cross. The third chapel the Chapelle Saint-André is also known as the "Chapelle des Morts" and is dedicated to those men of the parish who gave their lives in the Great War. The chapel includes three stained glass windows marking that war and a statue of Saint Michael and another of Saint Andrew to whom the very first Tréguier cathedral was dedicated.

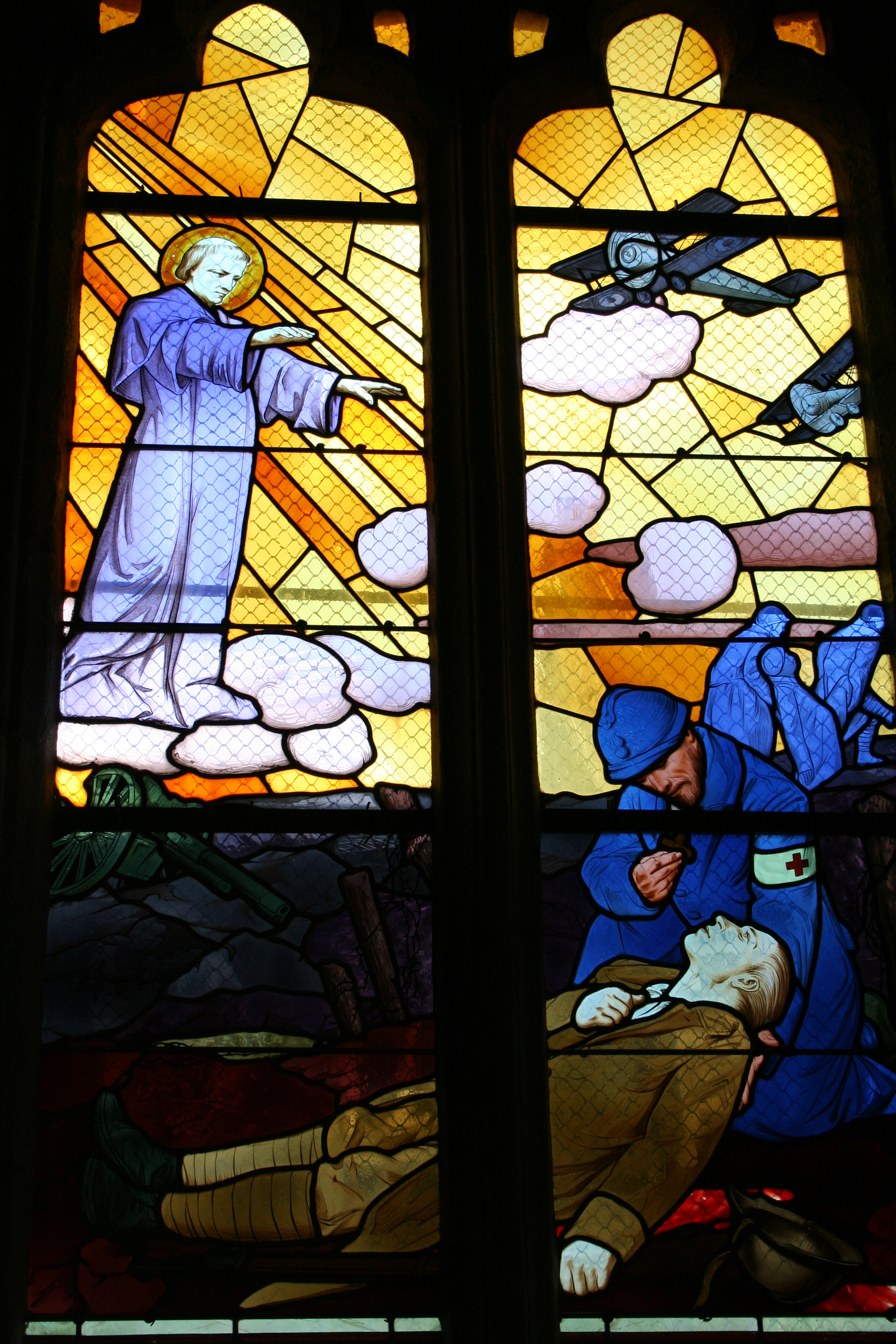
Stained glass window dedicated to those lost in the Great War.

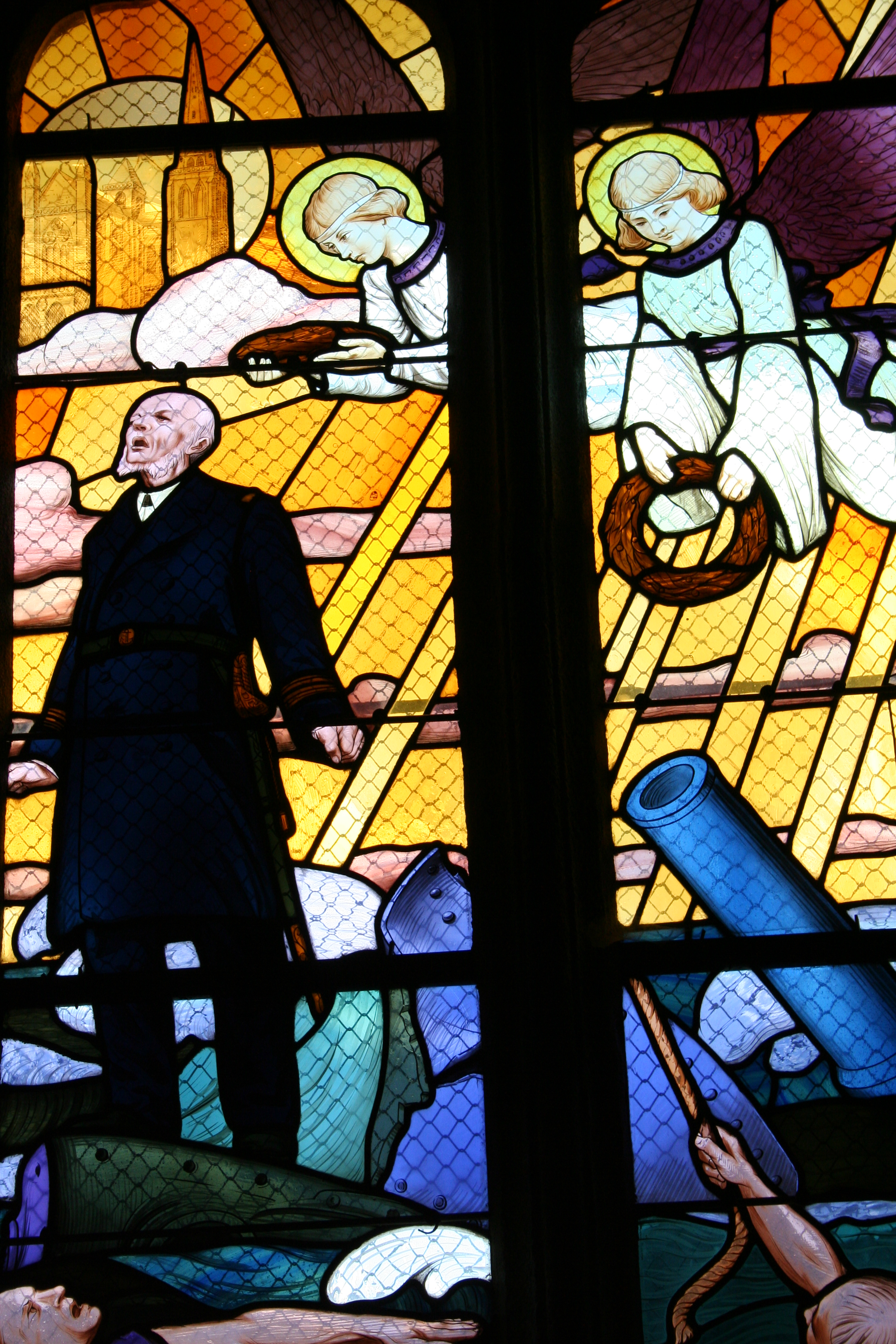
Stained glass window dedicated to those lost in the Great War.

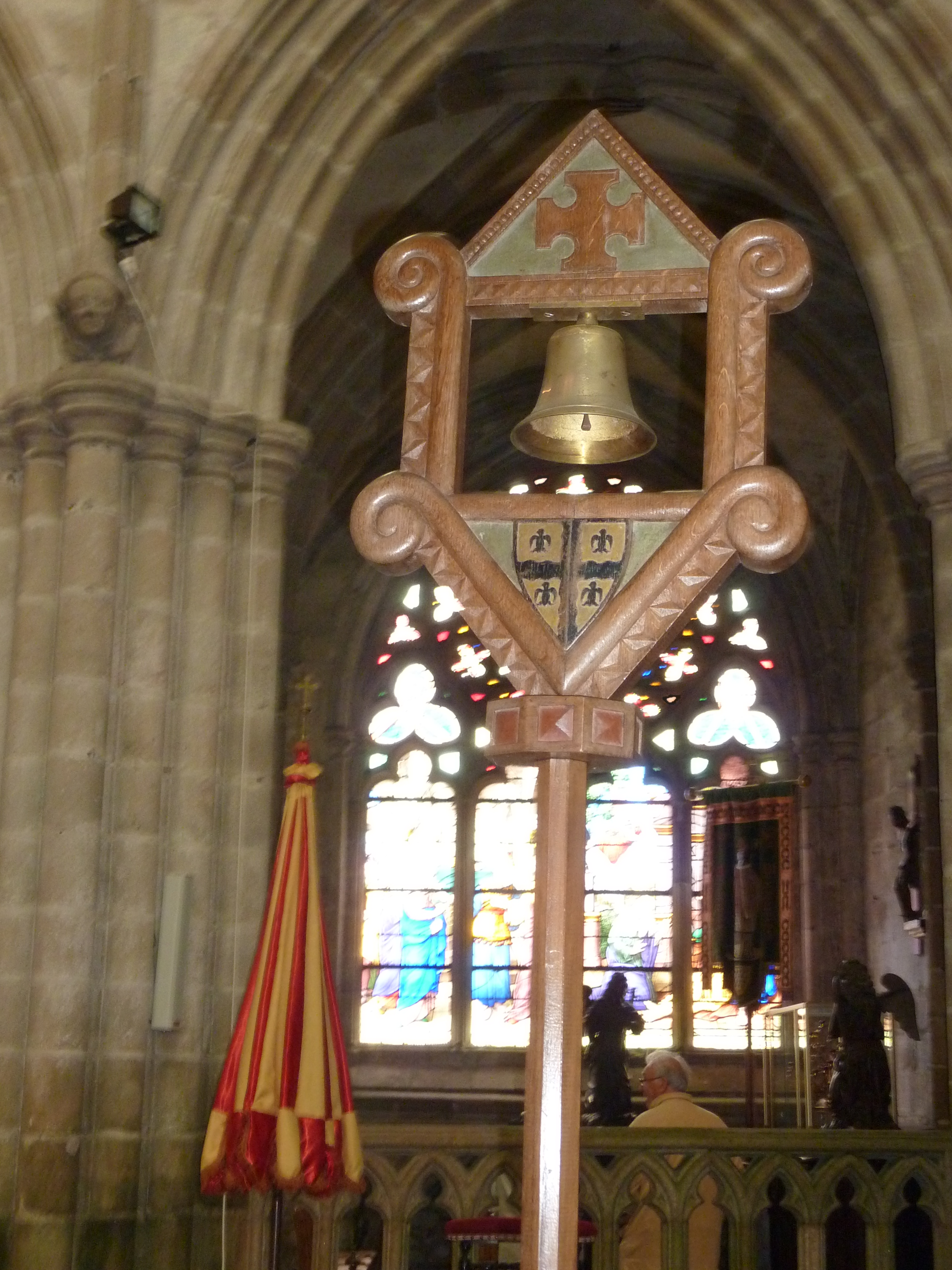
The interior of the axial chapel with the insignia of the basilica, the pavillon and the tintinnabulum

After the apsidal chapels the chapels along the south choir and in sequence are the Chapelle Saint François d'Assise with a statue of Saint Francis showing his stigmata, a "Vierge de Déliverance", a statue of Sainte Marguerite, a statue of Sainte Elizabeth, and a painting depicting "L'imposition du cordon a saint Francis", the Chapelle Notre-Dame de bon-secours, the Chapelle du Sacré-Coeur and the Chapelle du Rosaire et des Trépassés. The Chapelle Notre-Dame de bon-secours contains the enfeu of Bishop Christophe du Chatel who died in 1479 and a painting entitled "la Naissance du Christ" signed A.P. Noblet (possibly the Morlaix painter Jacques Noblet). It dates to 1640 and is a copy of a Rubens painting which originally hung in the Église des Capucins in Aix-la-Chapelle but is now kept in the Rouen Museum of Art.

After these chapels around the ambulatory, the next chapel in the south transept is the chapelle Notre-Dame du Rosaire which is joined by the chapelle des Défunts or des Trépasses. Before the Revolution all the cathedral chapels were furnished with decorated altars, altar-pieces and paintings but were destroyed on 4 May 1794 when revolutionaries ran through the cathedral with axes and machetes and smashed all before them.

== Oil painting "l'Apparition du Christ à Marguerite Marie Alacoque" ==
This 18th-century oil painting hangs in the cathedral and has the following inscription "Ceux qui prieront et adoreront le sacré Coeur de Jésus seront exaucez. L'an 1720, les pestiférez de Marseille et d'ailleurs ayant dévotement invoqué le Sacré Coeur divin, la peste cessa aussitôt. En faveur de ce miracle, l'an 1726, le pape Clément XI a accordé un bulle et des indulgences. Cette feste ce célèbre le vendredi qui suit l'octave du Très-sain-sacrement. Dite un Pater et un Ave pour celui qui a donné ce tableau".

== The Sacristry and the skull of Saint Yves ==
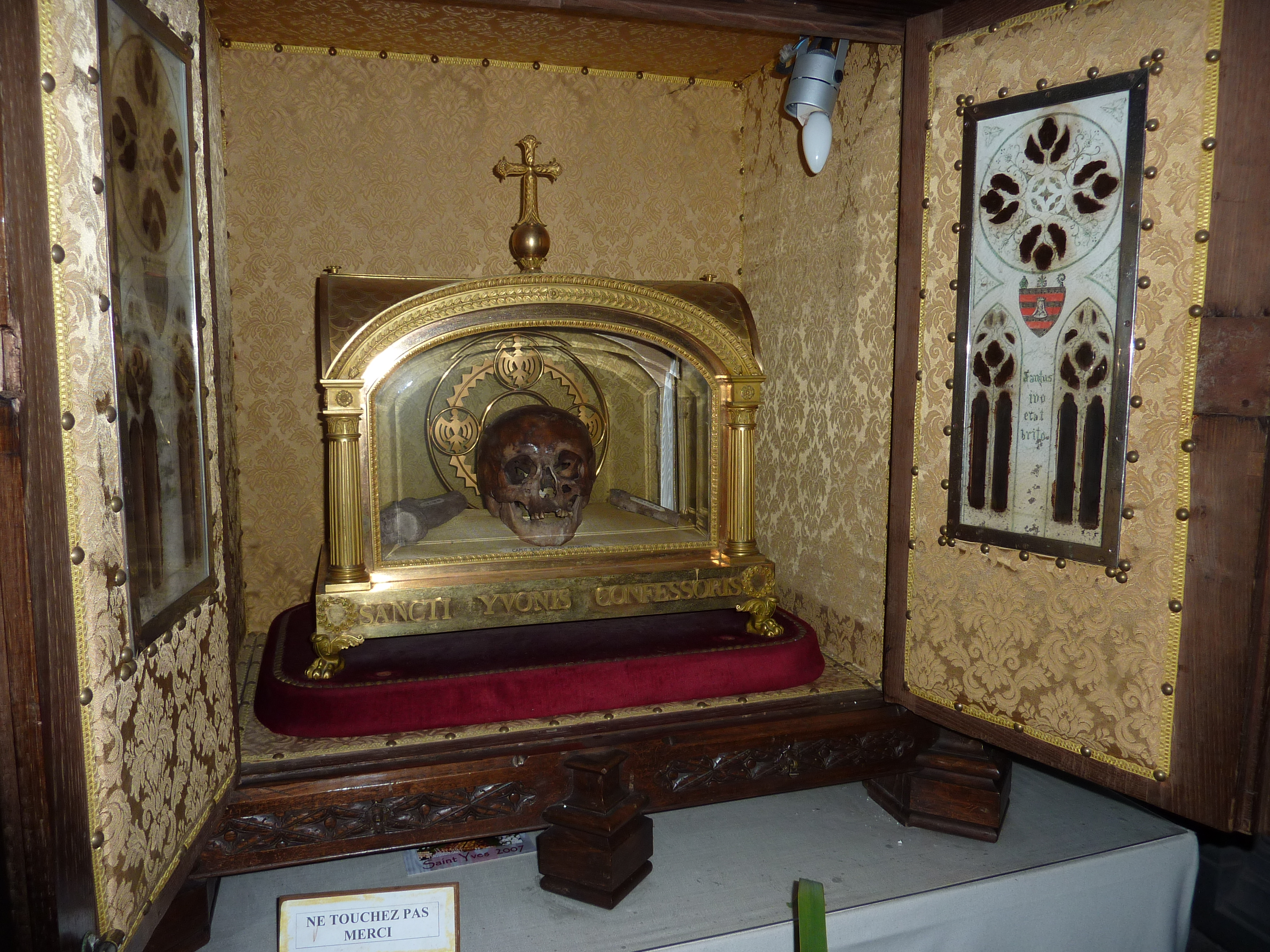
The skull of Saint Yves

This contains many of the cathedral's treasures including a reliquary said to contain the skull of Saint Yves. It is inscribed "SANCTI YVONIS CONFESSORIS". On the day of the "Grand pardon" in May of each year, this reliquary is carried in great procession to Minihy. This reliquary was given to the cathedral by Monseigneur de Quélen, the Archbishop of Paris, whose family owned the manor of Kermartin. The sacristy also contains other relics, jewellery and various documents and religious artefacts.

== Other items of interest ==
=== Statue of Saint Tudwal ===
In Tréguier's Rue Saint-André and in a niche in the "Maison de Retraite Sœurs du Christ" is a statue of Saint-Tudwal dressed as a bishop and holding a book.

=== Tréguier War Memorial ===
This war memorial is known as "La Pleureuse". Francis Renaud the sculptor had used Marie-Louise Le Put as a model for his sculpture. She wears mourning clothes with a large hood or cowl covering her head ("Capuche" in French ). The sculpture was commissioned in 1920, shown in 1921 at the Salon des Artistes and the memorial was inaugurated on 2 July 1922. At that time the sculpture was known as "Douleur".

=== Statue of Ernest Renan ===
This bronze sculpture is located in Tréguier's Place du Martray just by the cathedral. Renan was born in Tréguier in 1823 and died in Paris in 1892. He was a linguist, philosopher and writer, The sculpture is by Jean Boucher and was executed in 1903. Boucher depicts Renan sitting on a bench and behind the bench is a depiction of Pallas Athene, the Greek Goddess of Wisdom. Renan was the author of the enormously popular "Vie de Jésus" ("Life of Jesus") but the book's controversial assertions that the life of Jesus should be written like the life of any historic person, and that the Bible could and should be subject to the same critical scrutiny as other historical documents caused considerable controversy and enraged many Catholics. Thus the placing of Boucher's statue of Renan on Tréguier's cathedral square was interpreted as a challenge to Catholicism, and led to widespread protests, especially because the site was normally used for the temporary pulpit erected at the traditional Catholic festival of the "Pardon of Saint Yves". Athene's gesture of raising her arm to crown Renan was taken as a deliberate challenge to the cathedral. The erection of this statue and the surrounding controversy led to the construction of the "Calvaire de Réparation" a "work of protest" designed by Yves Hernot

=== Calvaire de Réparation ===
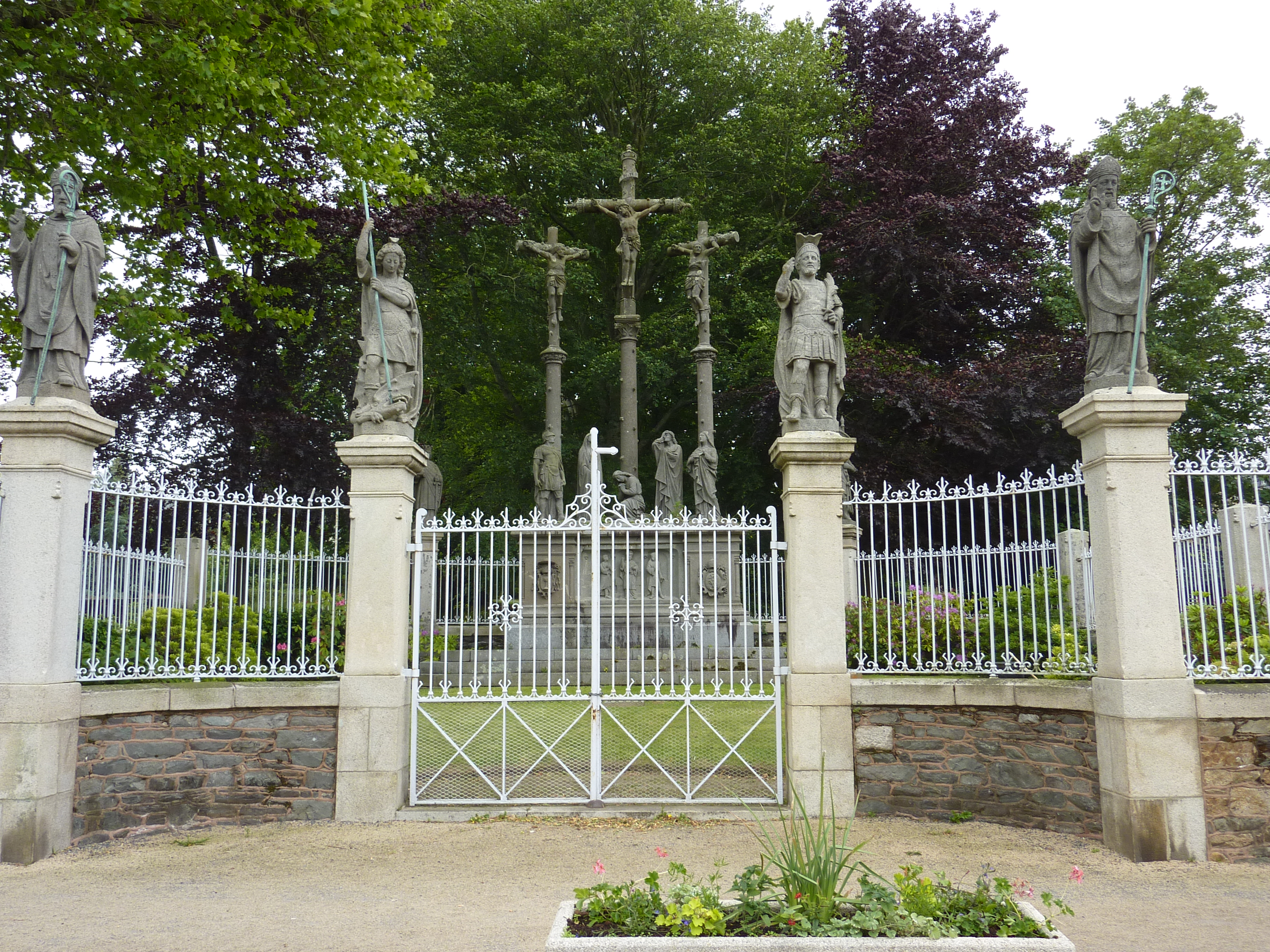
Le calvaire de Réparation

The central crucifix is 12 metres high and flanked by two 10 metres high crosses bearing the good and the bad murderer. At the foot of these three crosses are depictions of five people; St Longinus, who pierced Jesus in his side with a lance, Mary the mother of James and Joseph, a kneeling Mary Magdalene, John the Evangelist, and Sainte Mary, the mother of Jesus Christ. The crosses and attendant figures are positioned on a pedestal which is decorated with a bas-relief depicting Saint Yves and below this is inscribed "vere hic homo filius dei erat/en gwirione an den ze e ca mab doue/cet homme etait vraiment le fils du dieu". ("Truly this man was the Son of God"), the words in Latin, Breton, and French spoken according to the Saint Mark gospel by the Roman centurion at Golgotha (see Mark 15:39). In the bas-relief, the Saint Yves relief is flanked by the coat of arms of Pope Pius X (right) and of Pierre-Marie-Frédéric Fallières, Bishop of Saint-Brieuc and Tréguier (left). The monument was inaugurated on 19 May 1904 in the presence of Cardinal Labouré. The calvary is surrounded by a gated fence. The statues on either side of the gate depict Saint Maurice and Saint George whilst the other pillars support statues of Saint Malo, Saint Paterne, Saint Brieuc, Saint Pol (de Léon), Saint Corentin, Saint Samson and Saint Tugdual, the seven founder saints of Brittany.

== Recommended reading and sources for the article ==
"Cathédrales et basiliques de Bretagne" with preface by Yves-Pascal Castel, texts by Chantal Leroy and Dominique de la Rivière and photographs by David Bordes. Éditions Ereme. Paris. ISBN 9782915337693.

"La cathédrale de Tréguier" by Jean-Michel Boulbain. Editions CEFAG.

Michelin's The Green Guide. Brittany. ISBN 978-1907099724.

"Cathédrale de Tréguier" by Yves Thomas. Published by Imprimerie Lescuyer.

"Tréguier" by Michel Devillers. Published by Ouest-France. ISBN 285882049X.

== Sources ==
- Catholic Hierarchy: Diocese of Tréguier
