= List of royal saints and martyrs =

This list of royal saints and martyrs enumerates Christian monarchs, other royalty, and nobility who have been beatified or canonized, or who are otherwise venerated as or conventionally given the appellation of "saint" or "martyr". Their names are in English and, where known, in their own language. When the status of a nominee is dubious the whole entry is italicized. Popes are not included in this list, unless they came from nobility themselves. Although they may be considered sovereigns, a list of Papal Saints is enumerated elsewhere.

== Monarchs ==
This section enumerates Christian sovereigns, as opposed to mere consorts, who are enumerated in "Other royalty and nobility" below.

=== Saints ===
Image	Name	Recognized By	Sovereignty	Notes
	Abgar V of Edessa	Catholic, Eastern Orthodox	King of Osroene	The first Christian monarch in history.
	Æthelberht II of East Anglia	Catholic, Eastern Orthodox	King of East Anglia	
	Brychan Brycheiniog	Catholic, Eastern Orthodox	King of Brycheiniog	
	Canute IV of Denmark	Catholic	King of Denmark	
	Ceolwulf of Northumbria	Catholic, Anglican	King of Northumbria	
	Clovis I	Catholic	King of the Franks	
	Constantine of Strathclyde	Catholic, Eastern Orthodox	King of Strahclyde	
	Constantine I	Catholic, Eastern Orthodox	Roman Emperor	Constantine is not revered as a saint but as “the great” in the Latin Catholic Church. Eastern Catholic Churches such as the Ukrainian Catholic Church recognize him as a saint.
	Cynehelm	Catholic, Eastern Orthodox, Anglican	Kingdom of Mercia	His status as co-ruler of Mercia is usually considered to be legendary
	Dagobert II	Catholic	King of Austrasia	Son of Sigbert III
	Eberhard of Friuli	Catholic	Duke of Friuli	Son-in-law of Frankish emperor Louis the Pious and ancestor of all contemporary royals (Catholic)
	Edmund the Martyr	Catholic, Eastern Orthodox	King of East Anglia	
	Edward the Confessor	Catholic, Eastern Orthodox	King of England	
	Edward the Martyr	Catholic, Eastern Orthodox	King of England	Martyr
	Edwin of Northumbria	Anglican, Catholic, Eastern Orthodox	King of Deria & Bernicia	
	Eric IX of Sweden	Catholic	King of Sweden	Martyr, feast day of May 18.
	Ezana of Axum	Catholic, Eastern Orthodox, Oriental Orthodox	King of Axum	4th century King of Axum
	Ferdinand III of Castile	Catholic	King of Castile and Toledo	Known as "Ferdinand III the Saint", in Spanish "San Fernando" and "Fernando III el Santo"
	Guntram	Catholic, Eastern Orthodox	King of Orléans, King of the Franks	Merovingian king of Burgundy (Catholic); The Catholic Church celebrates his feast day on 28 March.
	Henry II, Holy Roman Emperor	Catholic, Eastern Orthodox	Holy Roman Emperor	Husband of Cunigunde of Luxemburg (see under "Other royalty and nobility" below), known as "Saint Henry II", in German "Heinrich II. der Heilige" ("Henry II the Holy")
	Hermenegild of the Visigoths	Catholic, Eastern Orthodox		Martyr
	Hoel, King of Cornouaille	Catholic, , Anglican	King of Cornouaille	Hoel appears in Welsh mythology and the Matter of Britain as a "king of Brittany". Mythology states that he was a relative of the legendary King Arthur.
	Jadwiga of Poland	Catholic	Queen of Poland	Known as "Saint Hedwig of Poland", "Saint Jadwiga, Queen of Poland" and "Saint Hedwig, Queen of Poland", in Polish "Św. Jadwiga Królowa Polski"
	Judicael of Brittany	Catholic	King of Domnonée	
	Justinian I	Eastern Orthodox, Lutheran	Byzantine emperor	Died 565, known as "Justinian the Great"
	Kaleb of Axum	Catholic, Eastern Orthodox, Oriental Orthodox	King of Ethiopia	Also known as Saint Elesbaan
	Ladislaus I of Hungary	Catholic	King of Hungary	
	Leo I the Thracian	Catholic, Eastern Orthodox	Roman Emperor	
	Leopold III	Catholic	Margrave of Austria	
	Louis IX of France	Catholic	King of France	in French "Saint Louis"
	Magnus of Orkney	Catholic Church, Anglican Church, Church of Sweden, Church of Norway	Earl of Orkney	12th century Earl of Orkney, and Martyr
	Olaf II of Norway	Catholic, Eastern Orthodox	King of Norway	
	Oswald of Northumbria	Catholic, Eastern Orthodox	King of Northumbria	Martyr; feast day is August 5.
	Oswine of Deira	Catholic, Eastern Orthodox	King of Deira	Martyr, died 651.
	Pompeia of Langoat	Catholic	Queen of Brittany, perhaps legendary.	
	Salomon	Catholic	King of Brittany	9th century Martyr and King of Brittany
	Sigebert III	Catholic	King of Austrasia	Merovingian king of Austrasia, father of Dagobert II (Catholic)
	Sigismund of Burgundy	Catholic, Eastern Orthodox	King of the Burgundians	
	Stephen I of Hungary	Catholic, Eastern Orthodox	King of Hungary	
	Tiridates III of Armenia	Catholic, Oriental Orthodox, Armenian Church	King of Armenia	
	Vladimir I of Kiev	Eastern Orthodox	Grand Prince of Kiev	First Christian ruler of Kiev, in the Russian Orthodox Church his title denotes "equal to the Apostles", in Russian "Владимир Святой", in Ukrainian "Володимир Святий" and "Святий рівноапостольний князь Володимир" ("Saint Equal-to-the-Apostles Duke Volodymyr") (Catholic, Eastern Orthodox)
	Wenceslaus I, Duke of Bohemia	Catholic, Eastern Orthodox	Duke of Bohemia	Died 28 September 935, Martyr, patron of the Czech Republic, in Czech "Svatý Václav", in German "Heilige Wenzel"
	Wigstan of Mercia		King of Mercia	Later became a monk.
	William of Gellone	Catholic, Eastern Orthodox	Count of Toulouse	
	Yaroslav the Wise	Catholic, Eastern Orthodox	Grand Prince of Kiev	

=== Saints exclusively in Eastern Orthodox religion ===
Image	Name	Recognized By	Sovereignty	Notes
	Alexander Nevsky	Eastern Orthodox	Prince of Novgorod, Grand Prince of Kiev, & Grand Prince of Vladimir	
	Andrey Bogolyubsky	Eastern Orthodox	Grand Prince of Vladimir	
	Archil of Kakheti	Eastern Orthodox	Prince of Kakheti	Martyr
	Ashot I of Iberia	Eastern Orthodox	Prince of Iberia	Martyr
	Boris I of Bulgaria	Eastern Orthodox	Knyaz of Bulgaria	
	Constantin Brâncoveanu	Eastern Orthodox	Prince of Wallachia	Martyr
	Constantine IV	Eastern Orthodox	Roman Emperor	
	David IV of Georgia	Eastern Orthodox	King of Georgia	
	David of Trebizond	Eastern Orthodox	Emperor of Trebizond	
	Demetrius I of Georgia	Eastern Orthodox	King of Georgia	
	Demetrius II of Georgia	Eastern Orthodox	King of Georgia	Martyr, also known as "Demetre the Self-Sacrificer"
	Stefan Dragutin	Eastern Orthodox	King of Serbia	
	John III Doukas Vatatzes	Eastern Orthodox	Emperor of Nicaea	Died 1254, known as "John the Merciful" and "John III Doukas Vatatzes"
	John IV Laskaris	Eastern Orthodox	Emperor of Nicaea	Died 1305, known as "John IV Laskaris" and "John IV Doukas Laskaris"
	Justinian II	Eastern Orthodox	Byzantine emperor	Died 711, known as "Justinian Rhinotmetos" ("ὁ Ῥινότμητος", "the slit nosed")
	Lazar Hrebeljanović	Serbian Orthodox Church	Knez ("Prince" or "Duke") of Serbia	Died 1389, known as "Tsar Lazar", canonized by the Serbian Orthodox Church as "Свети Косовски Великомученик кнез Лазар" ("Holy Great-Martyr of Kosovo Prince Lazar"), known as "Свети Цар Лазар" ("Holy Tsar Lazar") (Serbian Orthodox)
	Luarsab II	Eastern Orthodox	King of Kartli	Martyr
	Manuel II	Eastern Orthodox	Roman Emperor	Died 1425, known as "Manuel I Palaiologos" and "Manuel the Monk"
	Marcian	Eastern Orthodox	Roman Emperor	Died 457
	Mikhail of Tver	Eastern Orthodox	Grand Prince of Vladimir	Martyr
	Milutin Nemanjic	Eastern Orthodox	King of Serbia	Martyr
	Mirian III of Iberia	Eastern Orthodox	King of Iberia	Died 361
	Neagoe Basarab	Eastern Orthodox	King of Wallachia	
	Nicholas II of Russia	Eastern Orthodox	Czar of Russia	The Russian Orthodox Church Outside Russia canonized him in 1980 as a saint and martyr, the synod of the Russian Orthodox Church canonized him as a saint and passion bearer on 14 August 2000, in Russian "Царь-Мученик Николай II" ("Tsar-Martyr Nicholas II") and "Святой Страстотерпец Царь Николай II" ("Holy Passion-Bearer Tsar Nicholas II") (Eastern Orthodox); see Canonization of the Romanovs
	Nikephoros II	Eastern Orthodox	Roman Emperor	Died 969.
	Peter of Murom	Eastern Orthodox	Prince of Murom	Husband of Saint Fevronia of Murom
	Peter I of Bulgaria	Eastern Orthodox	Tsar of Bulgaria	He was the Tsar of the First Bulgarian Empire.
	Solomon II of Imereti	Eastern Orthodox	King of Imereti	
	Stefan Lazarević	Eastern Orthodox	Despot of Serbia	Known as "Stefan the Tall." He first ruled as a Prince of Serbia and then became despot.
	Stefan Nemanja	Eastern Orthodox	Grand Prince of Serbia	Canonized as Saint Simeon the Myrrh-streaming
	Stefan Nemanjić	Eastern Orthodox	Grand Prince and King of Serbia	Known as Stefan the First-Crowned
	Stefan Uroš III	Eastern Orthodox	King of Serbia	Known also as Stefan Decanski
	Stefan Uroš V	Eastern Orthodox	Emperor of Serbia	
	Stephen the Great, King of Moldavia	Eastern Orthodox		repaused 2 July 1504
	Tamar of Georgia (died 1213)	Georgian Orthodox Church (Eastern Orthodox)	Queen of Georgia	
	Theodosius I, Roman Emperor (died 395)	Eastern Orthodox	Roman Emperor	
	Theodosius II, Roman Emperor (died 450)	Eastern Orthodox	Roman Emperor	
	Vakhtang I of Iberia	Eastern Orthodox	King of Iberia	
	Vakhtang III of Georgia	Eastern Orthodox	King of Georgia	
	Vladislav	Eastern Orthodox	King of Serbia	

=== Catholic - Beati, Venerabili, and Servants of God ===
The Catholic Church classifies various holy persons who have not been canonized as saints in the lesser categories of beati, venerabili, and servants of God. These titles indicate grades on the path to canonization in that church.

Image	Name	Status	Sovereignty	Notes
	Alfred the Great		King of Wessex	
	Amadeus IX, Duke of Savoy		Duke of Savoy	
	Baudouin of Belgium	Servant of God	King of the Belgians	On 17 December 2024, the Vatican's Dicastery for the Causes of Saints officially launched the cause for the beatification and canonization of Baudouin.
	Brian Boru		High King of Ireland	
	Cormac mac Cuilennáin		King of Munster	
	Causantín mac Cináeda		Kings of the Picts (Catholic)	
	Charlemagne	Blessed	King of the Franks, King of the Romans, & Emperor of the Romans	Cultus fully permitted at Aachen; beatified by Pope Benedict XIV.
	Charles the Good	Blessed	Count of Flanders	
	Charles I of England	Cause partially opened	King of England, King of Scotland, King of Wales and King of Ireland	A Catholic chapter of the Society of King Charles the Martyr was established by a group in the Personal Ordinariate of the Chair of St. Peter with the blessing of Bishop Steven J. Lopes.
	Constantine of Cornwall		King of Dumnonia	Martyr
	Constantine XI Palaiologos		Byzantine Emperor	Not formally canonized, considered a "National Martyr" (unofficial)
	David I of Scotland		King of Scotland	Son of Saint Margaret of Scotland
	Edgar the Peaceful		King of England	Feast day is 8 July
	Æthelberht of Kent		King of Kent	Listed in the 1916 edition of the Roman Martyrology under February 24.
	Ælfwald I of Northumbria		King of Northumbria	
	Fedelmid mac Crimthainn		King of Munster	
	Francis II of the Two Sicilies	Servant of God	King of the Two Sicilies	In December 2020, Cardinal Sepe of Naples announced the opening of the process of beatification and canonization in the case of Francis II.
	Henry II the Pious	Servant of God	High Duke of Poland	The Roman Catholic Diocese of Legnica opened up his cause for beatification in October 2015.
	Henry VI of England	Cause opened	King of England, Heir and Regent of France, & Lord of Ireland	He has been declared martyr and wonderworker.
	Isabella I of Castile	Servant of God	Queen of Castile	Declared Servant of God in March 1974 & cause initially stopped in 1991. In April 2020, Pope Francis requested that her cause be reopened.
	James I of Aragon	Blessed	King of Aragon, King of Majorca, Lord of Montpellier, & Count of Barcelona	Cult in the order mercedarian.
	James II of England	Servant of God	King of England, King of Ireland, & King of Scotland	In 1734, spurred on by the English Benedictines of Paris, Archbishop Charles-Gaspard-Guillaume de Vintimille du Luc of Paris opened the Cause for the deposed and exiled James VII and II, who had died in France in 1701 after the Revolution of 1688; a 2019 article in the Catholic Herald provoked renewed interest in the possibility of the king's eventual canonization.
	Karl I of Austria	Blessed	Emperor of Austria, King of Hungary, King of Croatia, & King of Bohemia	Beatified by Pope John Paul II in October 2004.
	Lucius of Britain		King of the Britons	2nd century British King, whose historicity is disputed
	Ludwig IV of Thuringia		Landgrave of Thuringia	Husband of Elisabeth of Hungary (see under "Other royalty and nobility" below), not canonized but revered as a saint in Thuringia, in German Ludwig IV., der Heilige (Ludwig IV the Holy) (Catholic)
	Malcolm III of Scotland		King of Scotland	Scottish Gaelic: Máel Coluim mac Donnchada
	Malcolm IV of Scotland		King of Scotland	
	Pabo Post Prydain		King from Hen Ogledd	Traditionally identified with St. Pabo (Catholic)

=== Catholic - Closed canonizations ===
Image	Name	Status	Sovereignty	Notes
	Humbert III of Savoy	Pre-Congregation	Count of Savoy	Humbert was venerated right after his death, pre-congregation. In 1838, Charles Albert, King of Sardinia and his descendant, tried and failed to have him beatified by Pope Gregory XVI.
	Louis XVI	Closed	King of France	Requested by Marie Thérèse of France, daughter of Louis XVI; declined by the Congregation of Rites in 1820. In 1874, a Parisian Diocesan Commission was appointed to examine potential canonization, with the backing of Eugénie de Montijo and Prince Philippe, Count of Paris; no progress emerged following this.

== Other royalty and nobility ==
This section enumerates Christian royalty, including consorts but not sovereigns, and nobility. Christian sovereigns, while also "royalty", are exclusively enumerated in "Monarchs" above.

=== Saints ===
- Æbbe of Coldingham, daughter of Æthelfrith, king of Bernicia
- Ælfflæd of Whitby, daughter of Oswiu, king of Northumbria
- Ælfthryth of Crowland, daughter of Offa, king of Mercia
- Æthelberht, Prince of Kent, martyred in 669
- Æthelburh of Barking, sister of the Bishop of London, who was reputedly of Royal blood
- Æthelburh of Faremoutiers, daughter of Anna, king of East Anglia
- Æthelburh of Kent, daughter of Æthelberht of Kent, queen-consort of Northumbria
- Æthelburh of Wilton, Abbess of Wilton, half-sister of Egbert, king of Wessex
- Æthelnoth, Archbishop of Canterbury, died 1038, of the House of Wessex
- Æthelred, Prince of Kent, martyred in 669
- Æthelthryth, Abbess, died 679, daughter of Anna, king of East Anglia
- Æthelwine of Athelney, 7th century hermit, son of Cynegils, king of Wessex
- Adela of Normandy, Countess of Blois, daughter of king William I of England and mother of king Stephen (Catholic)
- Adelaide of Italy, empress-consort of Otto I, Holy Roman Emperor
- Adelaide of Metz, mother of Conrad II, Holy Roman Emperor
- Adela of France, daughter of king Robert II of France, wife of Baldwin V, Count of Flanders, mother-in-law of William the Conqueror (Catholic)
- Afrelia, Princess of Powys, granddaughter of Vortigern, became a nun
- Agnes of Bohemia, daughter of Otakar I of Bohemia, in Czech "Sv. Anežka Česká"
- Alexandra Feodorovna of Russia (Alix of Hesse)
- Alexei Nikolaevich of Russia
- Anastasia Nikolaevna of Russia
- Anna of Kashin, wife of Russian Grand Prince Mikhail of Tver (Orthodox)
- Arnulf of Metz, 7th century Bishop of Metz, ancestor of Charlemagne, and of noble family
- Ashkhen, Queen of Armenia and a member of the Arsacid dynasty by marriage to King Tiridates III of Armenia (Catholic)
- Avitus of Vienne, 5th century Bishop of Vienne, grandson of an unnamed Western Roman Emperor
- Balthild, Queen of the franks and wife of King Clovis II, died 30 January 680 (Catholic)
- Begga, daughter of Pepin of Landen and mother of Pepin of Herstal
- Bertha of Kent, revered as a saint but not canonized
- Blanche of Castile, queen consort of France
- Bojan Enravota, Prince of Bulgaria
- Boris, Prince of Kiev
- Bruno the Great - Son of Henry the Fowler and Brother of Holy Roman Emperor Otto the Great
- Budoc, 6th century Breton saint, Bishop of Dol, reputedly grandson of Evan, king of Brest
- Cadfrawd, perhaps known also as Adelphius, early Welsh saint, closely related to British royalty of the time
- Cainnech of Aghaboe, 6th century Abbot, descended from Kings of Ulster
- Canute Lavard, Danish prince, son of king Eric I of Denmark and ancestor of Danish monarchs.
- Casimir, son of Casimir IV of Poland, known as "Saint Casimir of Poland" and "Saint Casimir Jagiełło", in Polish "Święty Kazimierz" (Catholic)
- Clotilde, daughter of Chilperic II of Burgundy, wife of Clovis I
- Columba, 6th century Irish missionary, reputed to be great-great grandson of Niall, High King of Ireland
- Constantine Constantinovich, Prince of Russia
- Cunigunde of Luxemburg, wife of Henry II, in Luxembourgish "Helleg Kunigunde"
- Darerca of Ireland, 5th century saint, supposedly married to Conan Meriadoc, king of Brittany
- Dimitry (Dmitry) of Moscow
- Dinar of Hereti, Georgian royal princess
- Dubricius, bishop and grandson of Peibo Clafrog, a king of Ergyng
- Edburga of Winchester, daughter of Edward the Elder
- Edburga of Bicester, daughter of Penda, king of Mercia
- Edburga of Minster-in-Thanet, or Heaburg, or Bugga, daughter of Centwine of Wessex
- Edith of Wilton, English nun, a daughter of Edgar the Peaceful
- Edmund of Scotland, son of Malcolm III of Scotland
- Egwin of Evesham, related to Mercian royalty, Benedictine and Bishop of Worcester.
- Elgiva of Wessex, queen, wife of English king Edmund I and mother of another two kings.
- Elizabeth Fyodorovna of Russia
- Elisabeth of Hungary, wife of Ludwig IV of Thuringia (see above), in Hungarian "Árpádházi Szent Erzsébet" ("Saint Elizabeth of Árpád's Line") (Catholic)
- Elizabeth of Portugal, daughter of Pedro III of Aragon, wife of Denis of Portugal, known as "Saint Queen Elizabeth" and "Saint Isabel of Portugal", in Portuguese "Rainha Santa Isabel" (Catholic)
- Emeric of Hungary, son of Stephen I of Hungary, in Hungarian "Szent Imre"
- Emma of Hawaii, who helped to found the Anglican Church in Hawaii, United States (Anglican)
- Ermenilda of Ely, 7th century Abbess, daughter of Eorcenberht, king of Kent
- Fevronia of Murom, died 25 June 1228, Princess consort of Murom and wife of Peter of Murom. (Orthodox)
- Gleb, Prince of Kiev
- Gregory II, born into Roman nobility, died 731, a Pope of the Catholic Church
- Gummarus, 8th century Belgian hermit, related to Pepin the Short, and married to noblewoman named Guinmarie
- Hedwig of Andechs, daughter of Berthold III, Count of Tyrol, wife of Henry I of Poland, canonized 1267 as "Saint Hedwig of Andechs", in Polish "Św. Jadwiga Śląska"
- Helena of Constantinople, Roman Empress, died circa 327, mother of Emperor Constantine I (see above)
- Himelin, obscure Irish/Scottish saint, reputed to be brother of Rumbold and thereby son of a Scottish king
- Igor Konstantinovich, Prince of Russia
- Illtud, Welsh saint, who is considered in some sources to have been the son of a Breton prince, and to have been a cousin to King Arthur
- Ingegerd of Sweden, Grand Princess of Kiev as wife of Yaroslav I the Wise, and Swedish princess as daughter of king Olof Skötkonung (Orthodox)
- Ioann Konstantinovich, Prince of Russia
- Irene of Hungary, Roman Empress, died 1134, consort of Emperor John II (Orthodox)
- Isabelle of France, Princess of France, daughter of Louis VIII of France, younger sister of St. Louis of France (see above)
- Leonorus, Breton saint, son of King Hoel and Pompeia of Langoat
- Jeanne of France, daughter of Louis XI of France, wife of Louis XII of France, known as "Saint Jeanne de Valois", in French "Ste Jeanne de France"
- Juthwara, 6th century Virgin and Martyr, daughter of Perphirius of Penychen
- Kea, reputedly a grandson of King Lot
- Kentigern, Bishop and Patron of Glasgow, grandson of King Lot
- Ketevan the Martyr, Queen of Kakheti, canonized by the Georgian Church (Georgian Orthodox)
- Kinga of Poland, daughter of Béla IV of Hungary, wife of Boleslaus V of Poland, known as "Saint Kunigunda", "Saint Cunegunde", "Saint Kioga", and "Saint Zinga", in Polish "Święta Kinga" (Catholic)
- Khosrovidukht, Princess of the Arsacid dynasty of Armenia (Catholic)
- Kyneburga, Abbess, daughter of Penda, king of Mercia
- Kyneswide, Abbess, daughter of Penda, king of Mercia
- Ludmila, Czech Princess (Catholic, Orthodox)
- Margaret of Hungary, daughter of Béla IV of Hungary, in Hungarian "Árpád-házi Szent Margit" ("Saint Margaret of Árpád's Line") (Catholic)
- Margaret of Scotland, died 16 November 1093, granddaughter of Edmund II of England, wife of Malcolm III of Scotland, and mother of King David I of Scotland (see above), canonized in 1251 (Catholic)
- Mildrith, daughter of Merewalh, king of the Magonsæte, and granddaughter of Eormenred, possibly a king of Kent
- Mildburh, daughter of Merewalh, king of the Magonsæte, and granddaughter of Eormenred, possibly a king of Kent
- Maria Nikolaevna of Russia, died 1918
- Matilda of Ringelheim, queen consort of Heinrich I of Germany (Catholic)
- Matilda of Scotland, queen consort of England (Catholic)
- Matilda of Tuscany, margravine of Tuscany (Catholic)
- Mlada, the youngest daughter of the Bohemian prince Boleslav I (Catholic)
- Nana of Iberia, queen consort of Mirian III of Iberia (Orthodox)
- Odilia of Cologne, martyred with St. Ursula, apparently descended from British Royalty (Catholic)
- Olga of Kiev, regent of son Svyatoslav I, Prince of Kiev, in Russian "Свята Ольга" ("Holy Olga")
- Olga Nikolaevna, Grand Duchess of Russia
- Padarn, 6th century Bishop and Abbot, reputedly nephew of Hoel Mawr, king of Cornouaille
- Paul Aurelian, 6th century Bishop in Brittany, son of Perphirius of Penychen
- Philomena, 4th century martyr, who is considered to have been a Greek princess.
- Pulcheria, Byzantine empress, married emperor Marcian (Catholic and Orthodox)
- Ragnhild of Tälje
- Rumbold of Mechelen, early medieval Irish/Scottish missionary, reputedly son of a Scottish king
- Rumwold of Buckingham, died in 662 aged 3 days, grandson of Penda, king of Mercia
- Saizana, brother of King Ezana of Axum
- Sæthryth, 7th century Abbess, step-daughter of Anna, king of East Anglia
- Samson of Dol, 6th century Bishop and grandson of Meurig ap Tewdrig, king of Glywysing and Gwent
- Scaeva, daughter of King Hoel and Pompeia of Langoat
- Seaxburh of Ely, Queen-consort of Kent, daughter of Anna, king of East Anglia
- Senara, legendary Cornish saint, apparently daughter of Evan, king of Brest, and married to Breton king
- Serena, allegedly a wife to the Emperor Diocletian, but generally considered to be legendary
- Shushanik (Orthodox)
- Sidonius Apollinaris, 5th century Bishop, and a Gallo-Roman nobleman
- Sidwell, 6th century Virgin, of uncertain historicity, daughter of Perphirius of Penychen
- Tatiana Nikolaevna, Grand Duchess of Russia
- Teneu, princess of Gododdin, mother of Kentigern
- Theodora, Roman Empress, died 548, consort of Justinian
- Theodora, Roman Empress, died 867, consort of Emperor Theophilos (Orthodox)
- Tudwal, 6th century Breton monk, son of Hoel Mawr, a king of Cornouaille
- Tibba, Abbess, niece of Penda, king of Mercia
- Umbrafel, 5th century Welsh saint, son of Budic I, king of Brittany
- Ursula, daughter of Dionotus, king of Dumnonia; Virgin and Martyr
- Vladimir Paley, Russian Prince, martyred 18 July 1918 (Orthodox)
- Walstan, Prince who became a farmer, related to Aethelred the Unready and Edmund Ironside
- Werburgh, Abbess of Ely, died 699, daughter of Wulfhere, king of Mercia
- Wigstan, Martyr, died 839, grandson of Wiglaf and of Ceolwulf I
- Wihtburh, Abbess and Princess of Kingdom of East Anglia, died 743
- Wilgyth, obscure 6th century Welsh saint, possibly daughter of Perphirius of Penychen
- Wulfthryth of Wilton, Anglo-Saxon noblewoman, died 1000
- Wulvela, lived in 6th century, daughter of Perphirius of Penychen
- Wynthryth, obscure Anglo-Saxon saint, possibly related to the House of Wessex

=== Catholic Beati, Venerabili, and Servants of God ===
The Roman Catholic Church classifies various holy persons who have not been canonized as saints in the inferior categories of beati, venerabili, and servants of God. These titles indicate grades on the path to canonization in that church.

- Benedict XIII, born to the duke of Gravina, and a Pope of the Catholic Church
- Andrew Bertie, Prince and Grand Master of the Sovereign Military Order of Malta. Fifth cousin once removed of Queen Elizabeth II. Declared Servant of God in February 2015.
- Clotilde of France, Queen of Sardinia, wife of King Charles Emmanuel IV, and sister of Élisabeth of France. Her cause for canonization was open on 10 April 1808 by Pope Pius VII, in recognition of which she was accorded the title of Venerable.
- Constance of Sicily, Queen of Aragon, blessed
- Elena of Montenegro, Queen consort of Italy, she was made Servant of God in 2001.
- Eleonora d'Este, daughter of Francesco I d'Este, Duke of Modena and his first wife Maria Caterina Farnese.
- Madame Élisabeth of France, Princess of France and daughter of Louis, Dauphin of France (1729-1765), and youngest sibling of King Louis XVI. Her cause for canonization was open on 23 December 1953 by Pope Pius XII, in recognition of which she was accorded the title of Servant of God.
- Innocent XI, born into Italian nobility, and a Pope of the Catholic Church
- Isabel de Bragança Bourbon, Princess Imperial of Brazil; daughter of King Pedro II of Brazil and Queen Teresa Cristina of the Two Sicilies. Her cause for sainthood is in progress.
- Joana of Portugal, Princess of Portugal, daughter of Afonso V of Portugal, Dominican, known in Portugal as Santa Joana Princesa ("Saint Princess Joan"), although she is beatified only
- Jolenta of Poland, died 11 June 1298, daughter of Béla IV of Hungary, wife of Boleslaus the Pious of Poland, known as "Blessed Yolanda of Poland", "Blessed Yolande of Poland" and "Blessed Helen of Hungary", in Polish "Bł. Jolenta "
- Louise of France, Princess of France and Carmelite nun, daughter of King Louis XV and aunt of Élisabeth of France and Clotilde of France . Her cause for canonization was open on 19 June 1873 by Pope Pius IX, in recognition of which she was accorded the title of Venerable.
- Mafalda of Portugal, daughter of Sancho I of Portugal and queen consort of Castile, known in Portugal as Rainha Santa Mafalda although she is only beatified
- Margaret of Savoy, Marchioness of Montferrat
- Margherita Colonna
- Maria Clotilde of Savoy, daughter of King Victor Emmanuel II of Italy and Queen Adelaide of Austria and Princess of Napoléon. Her cause for canonization was open on 10 July 1942 by Pope Pius XII, in recognition of which she was accorded the title of Servant of God.
- Maria Cristina of Savoy, daughter of King Victor Emmanuel I of Sardinia and Queen Maria Teresa of Austria-Este and queen consort of the Two Sicilies, she was beatified on 25 January 2014 by Pope Francis
- Pius VII, born into Italian nobility, and a Pope of the Catholic Church
- Richeza of Lotharingia, Queen consort of Poland
- Sancha of León, a queen of León, daughter of king Alfonso V, wife of king Ferdinand I, and mother of three other kings
- Sancha of Portugal, daughter of Sancho I of Portugal, known in Portugal as Rainha Santa Sancha although she is only beatified
- Ignatius Spencer, son of the 2nd Earl Spencer. Great grand-uncle of Diana, Princess of Wales.
- Teresa of Portugal, daughter of Sancho I of Portugal and queen consort of León, known in Portugal as Rainha Santa Teresa although she is only beatified
- Zita of Bourbon-Parma, Empress of Austria and Queen of Hungary, wife of Karl I of Austria. Her cause for canonization was opened on 10 December 2009 by Pope Benedict XVI, in recognition of which she was accorded the title of Servant of God.

== Biblical royal saints ==
Melchizedek, the King of Salem, is venerated as a Saint and appears to be among the earliest Royalty in the Bible. Joseph is venerated as a Saint, within Christianity, with one apocryphal text (Joseph and Asenath) suggesting he may have even become Pharaoh after his work as Vizier in Egypt. Moses is also considered to have been saved, and is sometimes thought to have been a member of the Egyptian Royal family. King David of the Biblical Kingdom of Israel and his successors Hezekiah and Josiah of the southern Kingdom of Judah are traditionally considered to be Saints by Catholic teaching.

In the New Testament genealogies, Jesus Christ is a descendant of King David and has been proclaimed by the Catholic Church as King of the Universe. His mother, Mary, is also celebrated within Catholic teaching as Queen of Heaven. Within tradition, she too is a descendant of King David, as were both her parents - Sts. Joachim and Anne. Medieval traditions would include within this number some of the Apostles, as part of a broader kinship to Christ.

== See also ==
- By the Grace of God
- Divine right of kings
- Great Catholic Monarch
- Feast of Christ the King
- King Arthur
- List of canonised popes
- List of rulers who converted to Christianity
- Prester John
- Queen of Heaven
- Society of King Charles the Martyr
