= Henwg =

5th-century Welsh saint

Saint Henwg of Caerlleon upon Usk was a 5th-century saint and church builder.

== Family ==
Henwg was a pre-congregational saint of Wales, born about 487. His father was reputed to have been Umbrafel son of Budic I of Brittany and his mother, Afrelia the daughter of Vortimer Fendigaid, a son of Vortigern Gwrtheneu and Severa Verch Macsen.

His brother is said to be Maglor Ap Umbraphel (485-575), and another Unknown sibling.

== Life ==
He was reputed to be from Caerleon in South Wales and legend associates him with King Arthur and Constantine the Great. Very little is factually known of his life: most of what is known come from the songs of Taliesin the bard, his son who built a Church in his memory at Llanbenwg. He is recorded as having gone on a mission to Rome to ask the Roman Emperor to send Saint Germanus and Saint Lupus to assist in the Christianisation of Britain.
