= Umbrafel =

Umbrafel (born in 466 AD) was a 6th-century saint of Wales and nobleman of Brittany.

Umbrafel, born in 476 AD was a son of Budic I of Brittany. He was the brother of Miliau, Derwela, Rivod, the father of Maglorius. His wife Afrelia, was, in the fiction of Geofrey of Monmouth, the daughter of Vortimer, a son of Vortigern and Severa Verch Macsen. Their children were Maglor Ap Umbraphel (b. c. 485-575), Henoc Ap Umbraphel (b. 487), and another unknown child, Ap Verch Umbraphel.

Samson persuaded his parents to join a monastery, and at that time Umbrafel and his wife Afrelia, decided to do likewise.
