= Afrella =

6th-century Welsh saint

Afrella or Arilda was an early 6th century Welsh saint.

Afrelia was the daughter of "a high-ranking official at the royal court of Gwent" whom it has been suggested was Vortimer, a son of Vortigen and his queen Severa Verch Macsen (daughter of Roman Emperor Maximus).

She was the wife of Umbrafel. Umbrafel had a nephew Samson of Dol. When Samson persuaded his parents to join a monastery, Umbrafel and his wife Afrelia, decided to do likewise. Afrelia was also mother of Saint Maglorius, Henwg and another unknown child. She is said to have founded a monastery. Peter C. Bartrum suggests that she may be identical to the little-known Saint Arilda of Oldbury-on-Severn and Oldbury-on-the-Hill in Gloucestershire.
