= Treason of the Long Knives =

Apocryphal massacre in England

The Treason of the Long Knives (Welsh: Brad y Cyllyll Hirion) is an account of a massacre of British Celtic chieftains by Anglo-Saxon soldiers at a peace conference on Salisbury Plain in the 5th century. The story is thought to be pseudohistorical as the only surviving records mentioning it are centuries later in the semi-mythological histories of the Historia Brittonum and the Historia Regum Britanniae. Though a popular cautionary tale in medieval Europe, there is no other historical evidence for The Treason of the Long Knives. Most historians interpret the story as a purely literary construction.

== Legendary context ==
According to the tradition, Vortigern, who had become a high king of the Britons in the wake of the end of Roman rule in Britain, called for Anglo-Saxons under Hengist and Horsa to settle on the Isle of Thanet in exchange for their service as mercenaries in battles against the Picts and Gaels in Scotland. The settlers, however, exploit a drunken Vortigern's lust for Hengist's daughter into allowing them to increase their numbers and granting them more land, eventually including all of the Kingdom of Kent.

== Historia Brittonum ==
There is no account of this event in the 6th-century writings of Gildas. The story first appears in the much later Historia Brittonum, attributed to the Welsh historian Nennius, which was a compilation in Latin of various materials (some of which were historical and others mythic, literary or legendary) put together during the early 9th century, and surviving in 9th-century manuscripts – i.e., some 400 years after the supposed events. According to John Morris's textual analysis of the Historia, this tale derived from a north Welsh narrative which was mainly about Emrys (Ambrosius Aurelianus), which the compiler of the Historia incorporated into a framework drawn from a Kentish chronicle, together with details from a Life of Saint Germanus.

This is a literal translation of the Latin from Edmond Faral's (Paris 1929) edition of the text (sections in square brackets [thus] supplied from T. Mommsen's 1892 edition):

It happened however after the death of Vortimer, son of King Vortigern, and after the return of Hengist with his forces, they called for a false Council, so that they might work sorrow to Vortigern with his army. For they sent legates to ask for peace, that there might be perpetual friendship between them. So Vortigern himself with the elders by birth of his people [considered the matter and carefully thought over what they might do. And the same] opinion was with them all, that they should make peace, and their legates went back and afterwards called together the conference, so that on either side the Britons and Saxons (Brittones et Saxones) should come together as one without arms, so that friendship should be sealed.

And Hengistus ordered the whole of his household that each one should hide his knife (artavum) under his foot in the middle of his shoe. 'And when I shall call out to you and say "Eu nimet saxas" (Hey, draw your swords!), then draw your knives (cultellos) from the soles of your shoes, and fall upon them, and stand strongly against them. And do not kill their king, but seize him for the sake of my daughter whom I gave to him in matrimony, because it is better for us that he should be ransomed from our hands.' And they brought together the conference, and the Saxons, speaking in a friendly way, meanwhile were thinking in a wolvish way, and sociably they sat down man beside man (i.e. Saxon beside Briton). Hengistus, as he had said, spoke out, and all the three hundred elders of King Vortigern were slaughtered, and only he was imprisoned, and was chained, and he gave to them many regions for the ransom of his soul (i.e. life), that is Est Saxum, Sut saxum [, Middelseaxan, with other districts under his control which they named.]

== Geoffrey of Monmouth ==
The Treason of the Long Knives is also described in Book 6 of the Historia Regum Britanniae by Geoffrey of Monmouth, who wrote during the early 12th century and presumably used Nennius as his main source. According to him, the incident took place at a banquet in modern-day Wiltshire, ostensibly arranged to seal a peace treaty, which may have been the cession of Essex and Sussex in exchange for intermarriage between Rowena, the daughter of Saxon chieftain Hengest, and Vortigern. The story claims that the "Saxons" — which probably includes Angles and Jutes – arrived at the banquet armed with their long knives (seaxes) hidden on their persons. During the feast, on a given word of command, they pulled their knives and killed the unarmed Britons sitting next to them. Vortigern himself was spared, but all his men were butchered, except Eldol, Earl of Gloucester, who escaped.

== Name and legacy ==
The term the treason of the long knives was first used in English by Meredith Hanmer, who died in 1604, in his Chronicle of Ireland. The corresponding Welsh term twyll y cyllyll hirion was first used in or before 1587.

In 19th-century Wales, the term Brad y Llyfrau Gleision ('The Treason of the Blue Books') was coined to refer to the "Reports of the Commissioners of Inquiry into the state of education in Wales", and was considered a pun on "the treason of long knives".

The Night of the Long Knives was a Purge carried out by the Nazi Party in Germany over several days in 1934. References to 'Long Knives' may have been initially understood in a pejorative sense in accusations of treachery, but came to be adopted by the Nazis to express justifiable treachery for the good of Germanic peoples.

It was also used flippantly when British prime minister Harold Macmillan dismissed seven members of his cabinet in a "night of the long knives". It has also been used to refer to the assassination of Alexander Burnes in November 1841 in Kabul, Afghanistan.

In Canada the term was used by Quebec premiere René Lévesque in reference to the repatriation of the Canadian Constitution in 1981. (Before that time, the final constitutional authority for Canada resided in the United Kingdom). Initially eight of the 10 provincial premieres were opposed to repatriating the constitution. A compromise was hammered out in Lévesque's absence, and 9 of the 10 (only Quebec dissenting) agreed to it.

== See also ==
- King Arthur
- Betrayal of Clannabuidhe
- Barns of Ayr
