= Rowena =

Mythological wife of "king of the Britons"

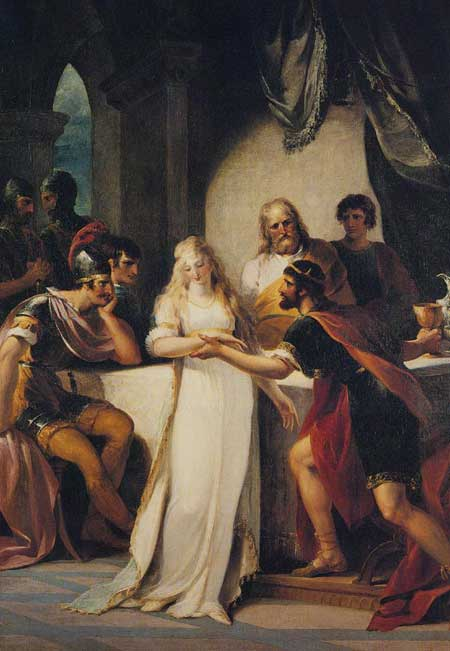
Vortigern and Rowena, by William Hamilton

Rowena /roʊˈiːnə/ in the Matter of Britain was the daughter of the purported Anglo-Saxon chief Hengist and wife of Vortigern, "King of the Britons". Presented as a beautiful femme fatale, she won her people the Kingdom of Kent through her treacherous seduction of Vortigern. Contemporary sources are nearly non-existent, so it is impossible to know if she actually existed.

== Name ==
The name "Rowena" does not appear in Old English sources such as Bede's Ecclesiastical History of the English People and the Anglo-Saxon Chronicle. It was first recorded by Geoffrey of Monmouth in his 12th-century Historia Regum Britanniae (in various spellings, including Ronwen, Renwein, and Romwenna), and may represent a Medieval Latin corruption of some lost Old English or other Germanic name.

Another possibility is that it comes from the Brittonic languages, where the name becomes Welsh Rhonwen; this could be connected to the word "horsehair" (Welsh: rhawn), which might be significant given her father and uncle's association with horses, but this is simply conjecture based on similarity of pronunciation.

== Attestations ==
=== Historia Brittonum ===
She is first mentioned in the 9th century Historia Brittonum (traditionally attributed to Nennius) as the lovely unnamed daughter of the mythological figure, the Saxon Hengist. Following his brother, Horsa, and his arrival at Ynys Ruym (modern Isle of Thanet), Hengist negotiates with the King of the Britons, Vortigern, for more land. At her father's orders, Rowena gets Vortigern drunk at a feast, and he is so enchanted by her, that he agrees to give her father whatever he wants in exchange for permission to marry her (the fate of Vortigern's first wife, Sevira, daughter of Magnus Maximus, is not specified). The text makes clear that the British king's lust for a pagan woman is prompted by the Devil. Hengist demands the Kingdom of Kent, which Vortigern foolishly grants him. The marriage took place that very day, and Vortigern slept with Rowena. Vortigern loved Rowena exceedingly. This agreement proves disastrous for the Britons and allows the Saxons to strengthen their foothold in Britain considerably. According to the Historia Brittonum, Vortigern "and his wives" (Rowena/Rhonwen is not named directly) were burned alive by heavenly fire in the fortress of Craig Gwrtheyrn ("Vortigern's Rock") in North Wales.

=== Geoffrey of Monmouth ===
Geoffrey of Monmouth's work Historia Regum Britanniae (History of the Kings of Britain, circa 1138) was the first to give Hengist's daughter a name, Rowena (described by the scholar Edward Augustus Freeman as "a later absurdity"), though the spelling varies widely by manuscript. According to Geoffrey, Vortigern usurps the throne of Britain from the rightful king Constans. Geoffrey claims the drunken seduction of Vortigern created the tradition of toasting in Britain. Vortigern's friendly dealings with the Saxons, especially his allowing even more settlers to join them, causes his sons by his first wife to rebel. Vortigern ignores the Britons’ pleas to drive out the Saxons because of Rowena. His eldest son Vortimer takes the British throne and drives out the Saxons, but he is poisoned by Rowena, who assumes a wicked stepmother role. Having regained the throne, Votigern heeded Rowena’s plea and once again invited Hengist and the Saxons to Britain. Later, the Saxons kill all the British leaders at the Treachery of the Long Knives, sparing Vortigern because of Rowena.

With her use of seduction and potions, Geoffrey's Rowena perhaps served as a basis for later villainesses of the Matter of Britain such as Morgan le Fay, and can be contrasted with his positive portrayal of British queens like Cordelia of Britain and Marcia. Another similar character is Estrildis, the rival of Queen Gwendolen, also a beautiful Germanic princess.

The marriage of Rowena in the Gesta Regum Anglorum by William of Malmesbury, a work contemporaneous with Monmouth's Historia, serves as an exemplum of the unification of ruling families after conquest, in this case Briton and German, thus legitimating the authority of the couple's descendants. Malmesbury had in mind Henry I and Matilda, whose marriage in 1100 had united for the first time the lineages, respectively, of the Normans and Anglo-Saxons.

=== Welsh tradition ===
In the Welsh Triads and medieval Welsh poetry, Rhonwen is "The Mother of the English Nation" who personifies Saxon treachery and Anglo-Saxon paganism.

=== Frisian tradition ===
In the Spiegel historiael (Mirror of History) by the Flemish writer Jacob van Maerlant (1284–89) Rowena's father Engistus is considered to be Frisian; 15th century chronicles identify him as the founder of the city of Leiden. His daughter Ronixe is introduced by Cornelius Aurelius in the famous Divisiekroniek (1517). From then on, Rowena is considered to be a Frisian princess (the current form Ronixa is derived from French sources). In Frisia, as in Britain, it was the custom that women welcomed visitors with a kiss. Therefore, Frisians began to believe that Rowena had introduced the custom of kissing in England. According to the Frisian historian Pieter Winsemius (1622) it was Rowena's Frisian kiss that seduced Vortigern to marry her.

== Later adaptations ==
She was a titular character in William Henry Ireland's play Vortigern and Rowena (1796). Her name was later borrowed by Walter Scott for the beautiful Saxon heroine in his historical novel Ivanhoe (1819), after which it came into use as an English given name. (Presumably due to the original legendary Rowena's character flaws, her name was not commonly used until after the appearance of Ivanhoe.)
