= Eldol, Consul of Gloucester =

British count and military leader

Eldol (Welsh: Eidiol Gadarn (Eidiol the Mighty)) also known as Eidiol ab Ner ('Eidiol son of Ner') or Eidol, is a legendary hero in Welsh mythology and medieval Welsh literature. A 5th century Briton named as Duke of Gloucester, accounts of his story are found in the epic poem Y Gododdin, the Trioedd Ynys Prydein and in Geoffrey of Monmouth'sHistoria Regum Britanniae.

Eldol was present at the Treachery of the Long Knives, where the Saxon leader Hengist ordered the assassinations of the unarmed British. Eldol is said to have survived this by fighting off and killing many of his would-be assassins with a wooden stake, before returning home to again fight alongside Ambrosius Aurelianus against the tyrant Vortigern and finally avenging the Treachery by capturing and executing Hengist on Ambrosius' orders.

== Early records ==
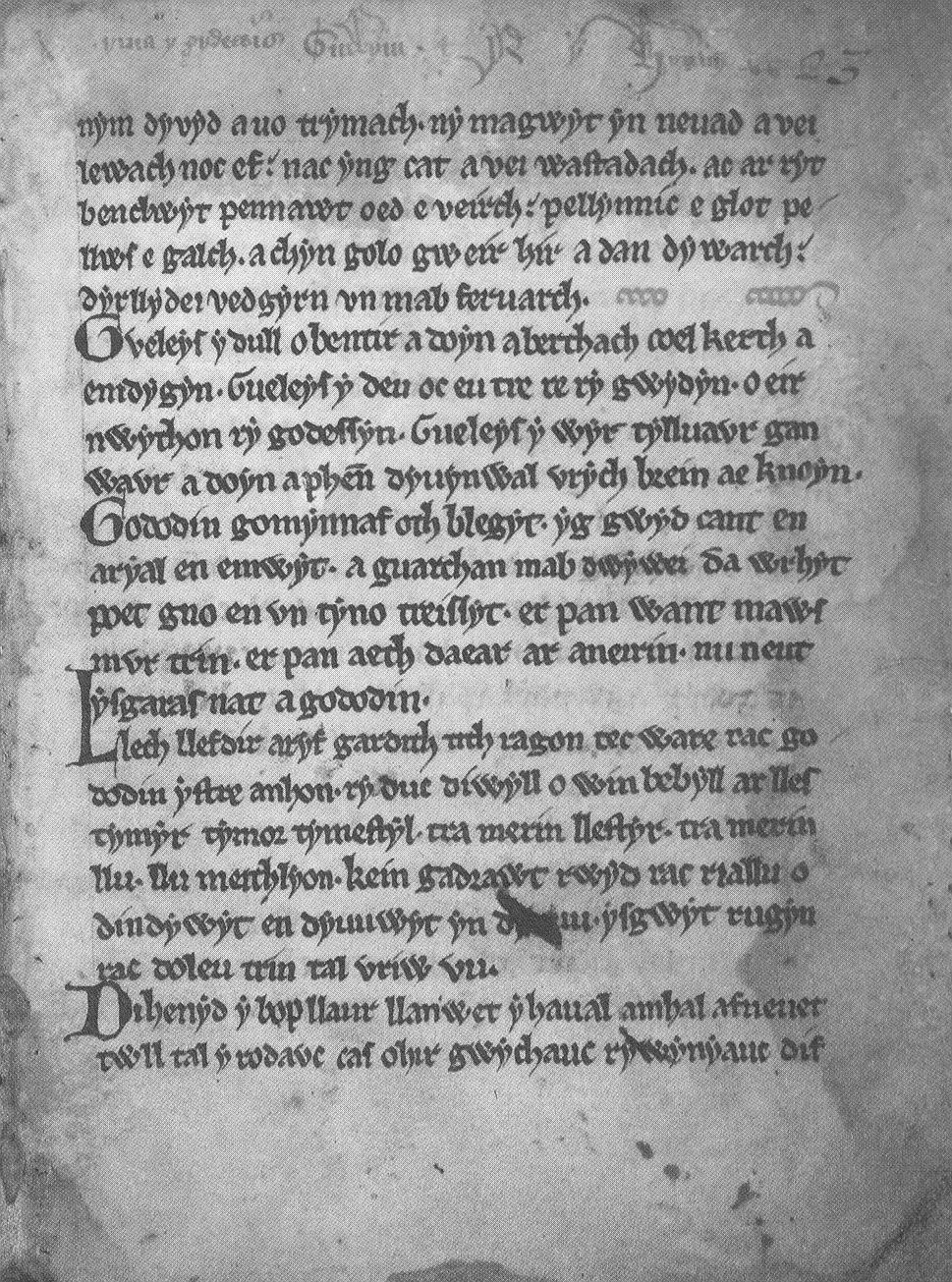
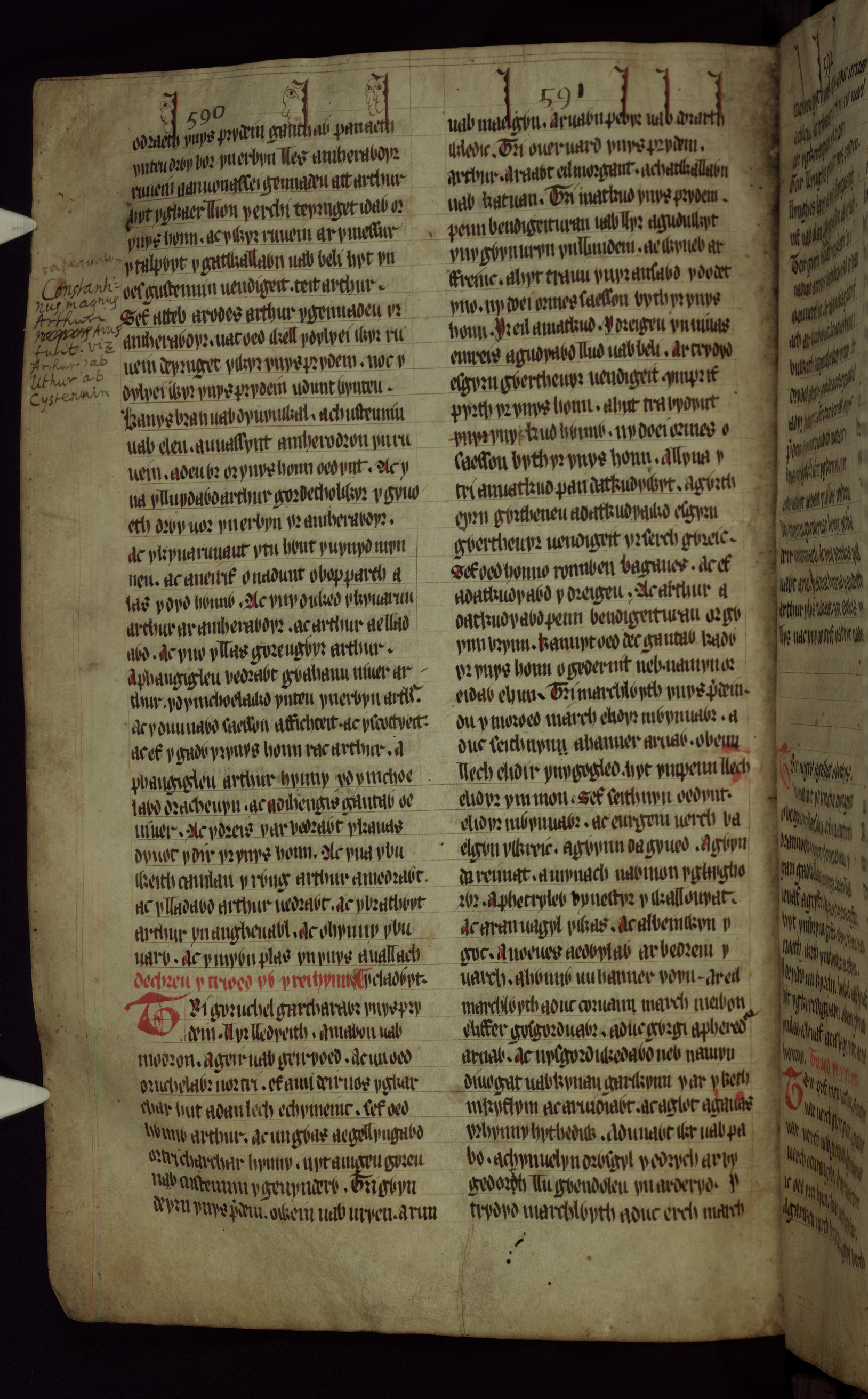
Eldol appears under the name Eidiol Gadarn in early Medieval Welsh literature such as Y Gododdin (left) and Trioedd Ynys Prydein (right)

The story of Eidiol Gadarn is briefly recorded in the Trioedd Ynys Prydein:

Tri Gyrddion Ynys Prydain
Gwrnerth Ergydlym, a laddes yr arth mwyaf ac a welwyd erioed a saeth wellten
Gwgawn Lawgadarn, a dreiglis maen Maenarch or glynn i ben y mynydd, ac nid oedd llai na thrugain ych ai tynnai
ac Eidiol Gadarn, a laddes o’r Saeson ym mrad Caersallawg chwechant a thrugain a chogail gerdin o fachlud haul yd yn nhywyll.

Translation:

The three vigorous ones of the Isle of Britain
Gwrnerth the sharp shot, who killed the greatest bear that was ever seen with a straw arrow
Gwgawn with the mighty hand, who rolled the stone of Maenarch from the valley to the summit of the mountain, and which required sixty oxen to draw it there
and Eidiol the Mighty, who, in the betrayal of Caersallawg, killed six hundred and sixty Saxons with a billet of the service tree, between sun-set and dark.

While the Triads were committed to writing in the thirteenth century, the traids themselves are much older. As a tool of oral Bards, it is thought that the story of Eidiol Gadarn was celebrated in as early as the sixth century. The same Eidiol is invoked as a paragon of martial energy and ferocity in Y Gododdin, the oral lament composed by the bard Aneirin around A.D. 600. In the poem, the relentlessness and bravery of the British warriors at the Battle of Catraeth is compared to the legendary Eidiol Gadarn.

== Historia Regum Britanniae ==
While Nennius recounts the Treachery of the Long Knives in the 9th century Historia Brittonum, there is no mention of Eidiol Gadarn or any British survivors other than Vortigern. However, the tale is recounted in detail by Geoffrey of Monmouth in the Historia Regum Britanniae. After recounting the Treachery, Geoffrey devotes a chapter of his sixth book to the escape of "Consul Claudiocestriae nomine Eldol" (English: The consul/count of Gloucester, named Edlol).

=== Treachery of the Long Knives ===
In Geoffrey's account, the Saxon Hengist returns to Britain with an army of three hundred thousand men, but sends word to King Vortigern that his forces will follow the commands of Vortigern and invites all the British leaders to meet at a time and place of his choosing. Vortigern agrees to meet at the Monastery of Ambrius on the calends of May. The meeting proceeded peacefully, until the moment came when Hengist called out "Nemet oure Saxas!", signaling to the Saxons there to draw their Seax (long knives) they had each concealed within their garments, and assassinate a total of 460 of the British delegation. Only Vortigern himself was spared, being immediately seized upon the signal.

Geoffrey states that a number of the Britons managed to arm themselves and kill a number of the Saxons by "taking up clubs and stones from the ground" but only names Eldol. In Geoffrey's account, Eldol finds a "palum" (English:stake) and stands his ground manfully, with every one of his blows "breaking either the head, arms, shoulders or legs of a great many" striking terror into the Saxon traitors. After Eldol has dispatched seventy men (without moving from his spot) he is overwhelmed by sheer numbers and no longer able to stand and fight, decides to make an escape, eventually returning to his home city of Gloucester.

=== Second encounter with Hengist ===
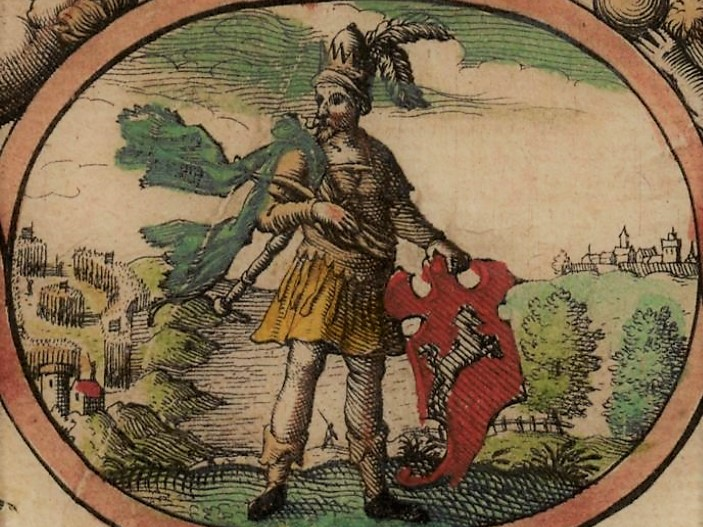
The Saxon leader Hengist, who according to Welsh legend was responsible for the Treachery of the Long Knives and was ultimately executed by Eldol (Depicted in John Speed's 1611 "Saxon Heptarchy"

Eldol is again mentioned in books 8 and 9 of Geoffrey's work, now named as Duke of Gloucester. Geoffrey portrays Eldol as a key supporter to the new king, Ambrosius Aurelianus who speak directly to Eldol before his siege on Vortigern's tower, referring to him as "Dux nobilis" (English: noble Duke). After this victory, Ambrosius and Eldol march against the vast pagan army still led by Hengist. In the build up to the battle, Eldol speaks to the king, outlining his desire to personally avenge the betrayal on Hengist and again recounting the events of the Treachery:

Sola dies pro omnibus diebus vitae meae mihi sufficeret, si congredi cum Hengisto mihi Deus concederet. Nempe succumberet alter nostrum, dum gladiis insisteremus. Reminiscor namque diei qua convenimus quasi pacem habituri: cumque de concordia ageretur, prodidit omnes qui aderant, et cum cultris interfecit, praeter me solum, qui reperto palo evasi. Succubuerunt eadem die quadringenti sexaginta barones ac consules, qui omnes inermes advenerant. In tanto periculo subvectavit mihi deus palum, quo defensus evasi

Translation:

This one day should suffice for all the days of my life, if by good providence I could but get an opportunity to engage with Hengist; for one of us should die before we parted. I still retain deeply fixed in my memory the day appointed for our peaceably treating together, but which he villainously made use of to assassinate all that were present at the treaty, except myself only, who stood upon my defence with a stake which I accidentally found, until I made my escape. That very day proved fatal, through his treachery, to no less than four hundred and sixty barons and consuls, who all went unarmed. From that conspiracy God was pleased to deliver me, by throwing a stake in my way, wherewith I defended myself and escaped

In the battle itself, Eldol's chief endeavour is to encounter Hengist in person, but he is thwarted when Hengist flees the battlefield for the town of Cunungeburg (known to the Britons as Kaerconan) when his troops are routed. There Hengist is able to assembled his troops for another engagement and another furious battle takes place outside the town walls. This time, despite both sides losing huge numbers in casualties, the Saxons are able to hold their ground. The battle is finally won when Gorlois, Duke of Cornwall, makes a decisive advance into the Saxon army. With victory near, Eldol finally sees an opportunity, marching through the fray Eldol grabs Hengist by his helmet and through his strength alone, drags him back into the British ranks. In sheer joy at fulfilling his goal, Eldol cries out in a loud voice:

“Desiderium meum implevit Deus! prosternite viri obstantes Ambrones, prosternite. Vobis est in manu victoria; vicistis enim devicto Hengisto.

Translation:

God has fulfilled my desire! My brave soldiers, down, down, with your enemies the Ambrons. The victory is now in your hands: Hengist is defeated, and the day is your own.

After the battle, Aurelius orders that the fallen Saxon warriors are buried according to their practices, but summons a council to debate what should be the fate of the captured Hengist. Eldol's brother, Eldad, Bishop of Gloucester speaks in favour of execution by evoking the name of Samuel, who slayed Agag as punishment for his crimes. Following his brother's speech, Eldol takes Hengist outside the city walls and beheads him with his own sword.

== Later accounts ==
Thomas Rudge gives an account in his 1811 The History and Antiquities of Gloucester:

Eldol, or Edel, a Briton, is said to have been Earl of Gloucester in 461; he was, according to the account of Robert of Gloucester, and other historians, a knight of great prowess. He attended King Vortigern at the treaty of Ambresbury in Wiltshire, to which they were invited by Hengist, the Saxon, with the express stipulation that neither party should go thither armed; but the Saxons having, contrary to their engagement, concealed long knives under their clothes, murdered great numbers of the Britons. Eldol is said at this time to have exerted himself so powerfully with a stake he happened to find, as to slay no less than seventy of the Saxons, and after having disabled many more, he escaped to Gloucester, his own city. He is also said to have behaved with uncommon courage, in a subsequent battle between Ambrosius, King of the Britons, and Hengist, when ... he rushed through the Pagan army, took Hengist prisoner, and cut off his head.

== In modern literature ==
Eldol and Eldad have minor roles in the 1970 novel The Crystal Cave by Mary Stewart. After the battle with Hengist, one of Ambrosius's men says to Merlin, "... old Eldad laid about him [i.e., fought well] with the best of them. Did you see him?" Merlin replies wryly, "I heard him."
