= Battle of Aylesford =

Battle between Britons and Anglo-Saxons, fought at Aylesford, Kent, England

Coordinates: 51°19′N 0°30′E

- Part of the Anglo-Saxon settlement of Britain
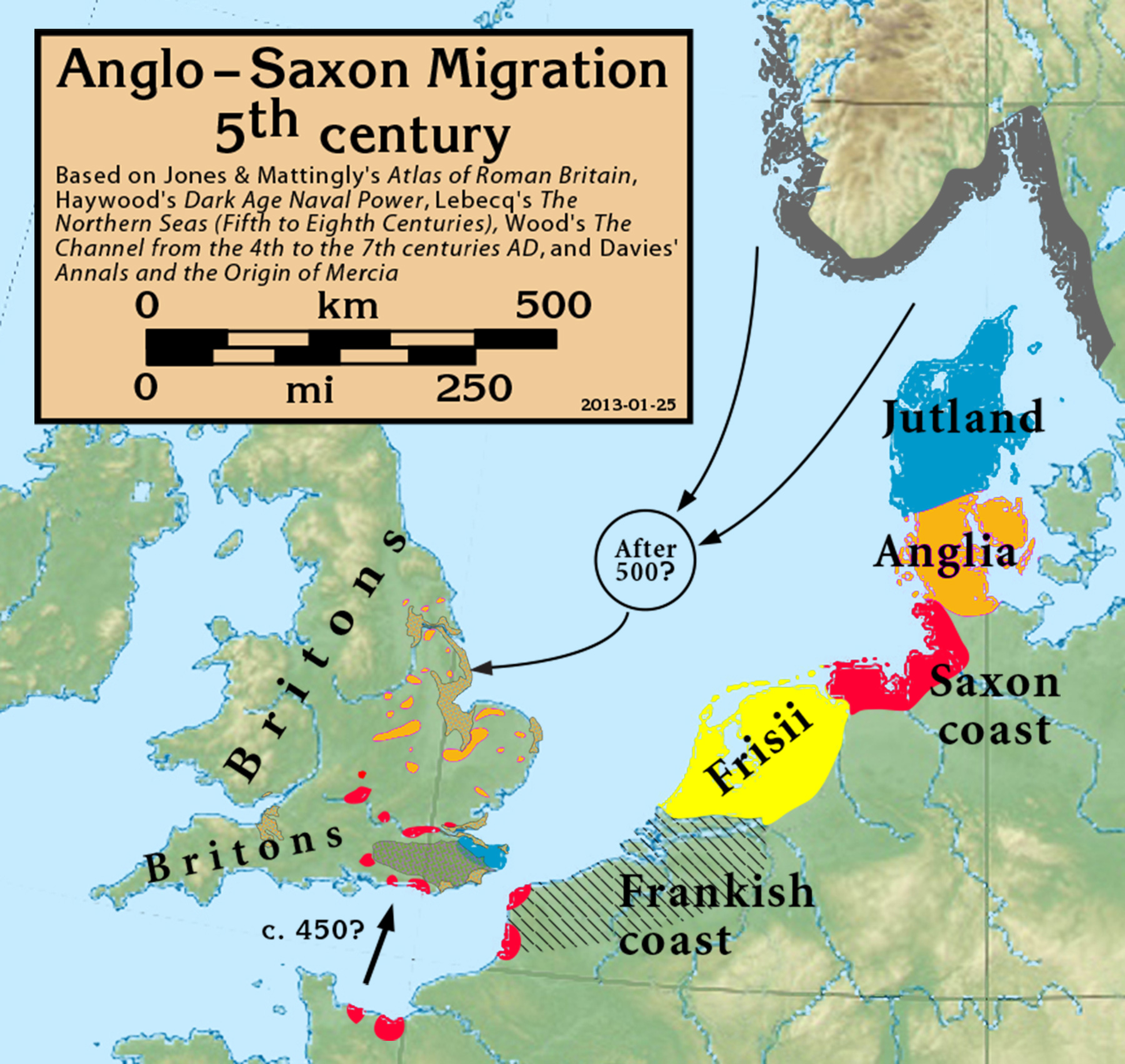
- Anglo-Saxon Migration in the 5th century
Date	455 AD
Location	Aylesford, Kent
Result	Unclear

Belligerents
Anglo-Saxons	Britons

Commanders and leaders
Hengist; Horsa †	Possibly Vortigern; Vortimer; Catigern †

Strength
Unknown	Unknown

Casualties and losses
Unknown	Unknown

The Battle of Aylesford or Epsford (Old English: Æȝelesford) was fought between Britons and Anglo-Saxons recorded in the Anglo-Saxon Chronicle and the Historia Brittonum. Both sources concur that it involved the Anglo-Saxon leaders Hengist and Horsa on one side and the family of Vortigern on the other, but neither says who won the battle. It was fought near Æglesthrep, presumed to be Aylesford, in Kent.

== History ==
The ninth-century Anglo-Saxon Chronicle mentions the battle in the entry for 455. According to the text, the Anglo-Saxon leaders Hengist and Horsa fought Vortigern, King of the Britons, in the battle. Horsa was slain, and Hengist and his son Oisc became the Kings of Kent:

Her Hengest 7 Horsa fuhton wiþ Wyrtgeorne þam cyninge, in þære stowe þe is gecueden Agælesþrep, 7 his broþur Horsan man ofslog; 7 æfter þam Hengest feng to rice 7 Æsc his sunu.

This year Hengest and Horsa fought with Wurtgern the king on the spot that is called Aylesford. His brother Horsa being there slain, Hengest afterwards took to the kingdom with his son Esc.

The Historia Brittonum, also written in the ninth century, contains a variant account of the battle. Chapters 43–45 indicate that Vortigern's son Vortimer, not Vortigern himself, rose against the Saxons and engaged them in four battles. The third of these battles was fought "at the Ford, in their language called Epsford, though in ours Set thirgabail." At this battle Horsa fell, as did Vortimer's brother Catigern. The Historia does not say who won the battle, saying specifically that during Vortimer's campaign the Saxons "sometimes extended their boundaries by victory, and sometimes were conquered and driven back." According to the text, the Britons successfully ousted the Saxons at the fourth battle, fought "near the stone on the shore of the Gallic sea". However, Vortimer's death shortly after ensured the victory was short-lived. The Anglo-Saxon Chronicle account is similarly grim for the Britons, saying that they were forced to forsake Kent for good following Hengest and Oisc's bloody victory at Crayford in 457.

Two Neolithic chamber tombs near Aylesford, Kit's Coty House and White Horse Stone, are identified in local tradition as the burial places of Catigern and Horsa respectively.

There is a possibility that Agælesþrep is actually Rochester as 'Agæles' translates from the Saxon as 'Eagles' and 'þreáp' translates as 'troops' so is the 'Place of the Eagle troops' - the Eagle being the Roman Legion symbol, hence the place where the Roman Legions were based. If Hengest and Horsa wanted to take over Kent, then from their landing at Thanet they would have taken Watling Street towards London, and if Vortigern/Vortimer was looking for a good place to stop them, a Roman Fort on Watling Street would have been much better proposition than a ford across the Medway.
