= Battle of Guoloph =

Fifth-century conflict in England

Coordinates: 51.127440°N 1.569520°W

The Battle of Guoloph, also known as the Battle of Wallop, purportedly took place in the 5th century. Various dates have been put forward: 440 AD by Alfred Anscombe, 437 AD according to John Morris, and 458 by Nikolai Tolstoy. It took place at what is now Nether Wallop, 15 kilometres southeast of Amesbury, in the district of Test Valley, northeastern Hampshire. The battle was an internal conflict between the rival Britonnic forces of Ambrosius Aurelianus and Vortigern (Vitalinus).

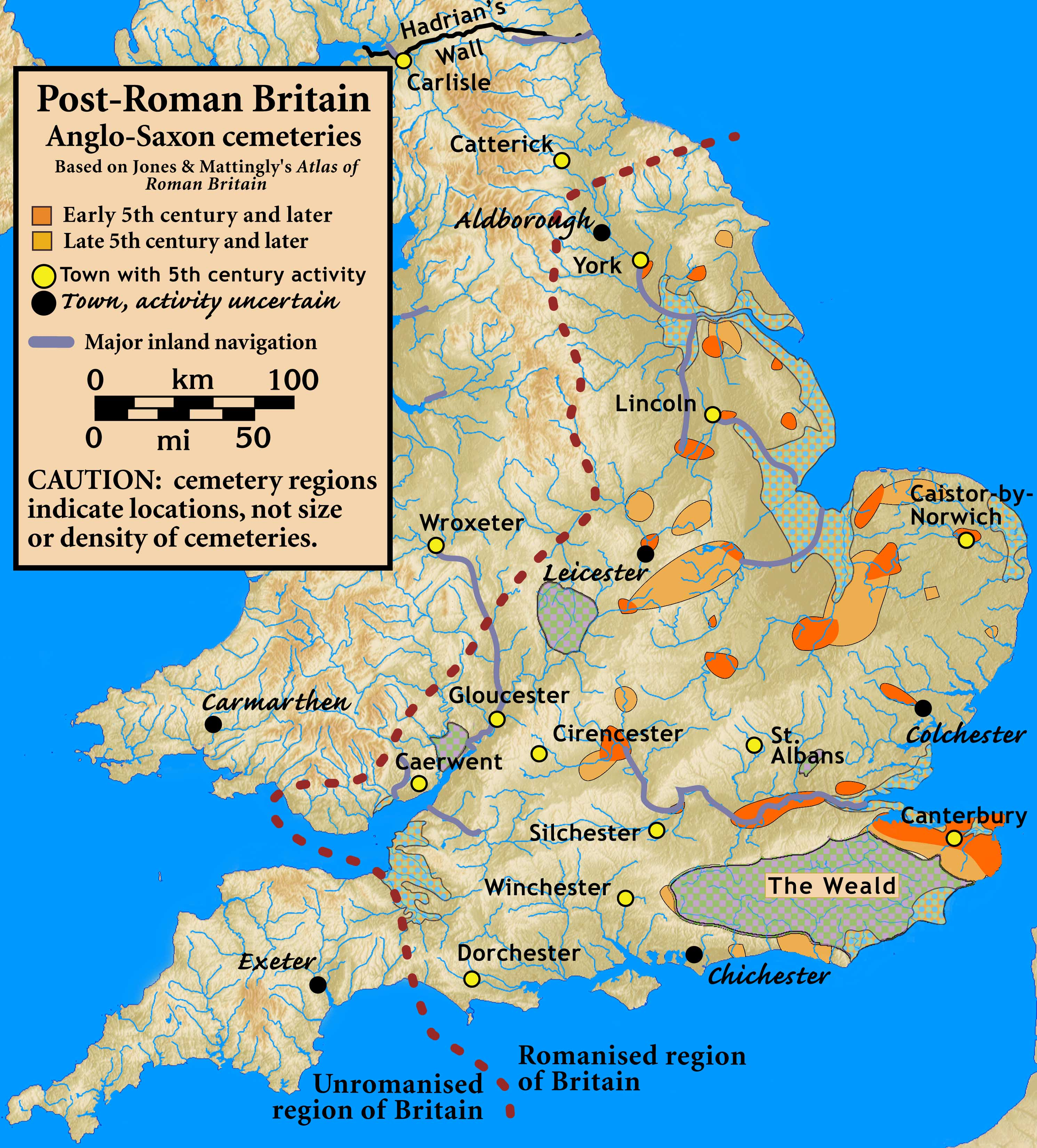
Anglo-Saxon cemeteries in 5th century Britain

== Context ==
In his book Historia Brittonum, Nennius affirms that "The reign of Vortigern, and the fight between Vitalinus and Ambrosius in Guoloppum, the Battle of Guoloph, are separated by twelve years". The battle is thought to have been part of the long rivalry between rival British kings Vortigern and Ambrosius Aurelianus for control of southern Britain in the wake of the Roman withdrawal in 410.

In the 12th century A.D. (largely fictitious) pseudo-history written by Geoffrey of Monmouth – the Historia Regum Britanniae – Ambrosius Aurelianus (Emrys Wledig, the imperator) is considered the son of the emperor Constantine. Geoffrey of Monmouth states that while Ambrosius was a child, his entire family was assassinated with only him and his brother Uther Pendragon making their escape via a canal at the court of their cousin, Budic I of Brittany. This attack was allegedly perpetrated by Vortigern, governor of the city of Dubris, one of the most important ports in the kingdom. Vortigern had formed a pact with the powerful Jute kings, Hengist and Horsa.

Years later, Ambrosius returned to Great Britain, disembarking at Totnes (Devon), to effect a reunion of the monarchs of all the kingdoms of the south with the purpose of forging alliances and solving collective problems. It was there that he was able to convince the Romano-British leaders of the Jute menace and of their alliance between Vortigern.
