= Tudwal =

Breton bishop and saint

Saint Tudwal
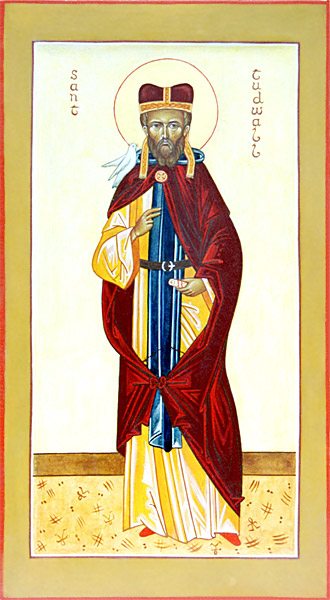
- Icon of Saint Tugdual
- Born: 5th century AD; Tenby
- Died: 564 AD; Tréguier
- Venerated in: Eastern Orthodox Church; Roman Catholic Church; Anglican Communion; True Orthodox Church
- Feast: 30 November or 1 December
- Attributes: bishop holding a dragon

Saint Tudwal (born c. 5th century AD - died c. 564 AD), also known as Tual, Tudgual, Tugdual, Tugual, Pabu, Papu, or Tugdualus (Latin), was a Breton monk, considered to be one of the seven founder saints of Brittany.

== Life ==
Tudwal was said to be the son of Hoel Mawr (Hoel I) and his wife, Pompeia, and a brother of Saint Leonorus. Tudwal travelled to Ireland to learn the scriptures, and then became a hermit on Saint Tudwal's Island East, off the coast of North Wales. Tudwal later immigrated to Brittany, settling in Lan Pabu with 72 followers, where he established a large monastery under the patronage of his cousin, King Deroch of Domnonée. He traveled to Paris to obtain confirmation of the land grant from King Childebert I, who insisted he be Bishop of Tréguier.

Tudwal is shown in iconography as a bishop holding a dragon, now the symbol of Tregor. His feast day is celebrated on 1 December.

Tro Breizh (Breton for "Tour of Brittany") is a pilgrimage that links the towns of the seven founding saints of Brittany. These seven saints were Celtic monks from Britain from around the 5th or 6th century who went to Brittany to minister to the Britons who had settled there after the Anglo-Saxon incursions in their homeland. Among the first bishoprics was Tréguier, Saint Tudwal's town.

== Notable namesake ==
- Tugdual Menon

== Gallery ==
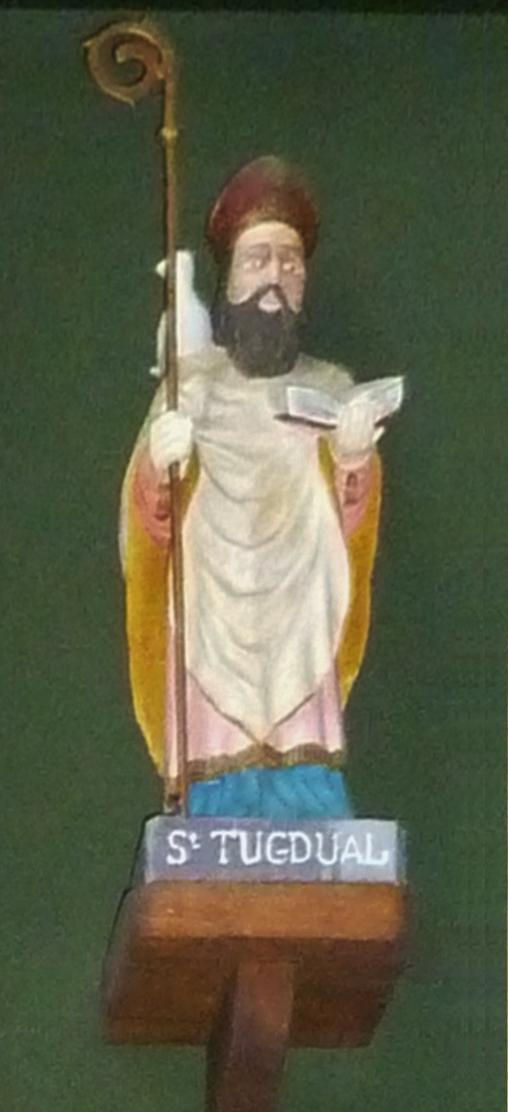
A statue of the saint at Saint-Pol-de-Léon

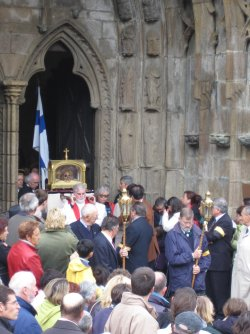
The relics of Saints Ives and Tudwal in a procession at the gate of Tréguier Cathedral in 2005

== See also ==
- Blessed Julian Maunoir, "Apostle of Brittany"
- St Tugual's Chapel, chapel named after St Tudwal
- St Tudwal's Church, Barmouth, church named after St Tudwal
- Saint Tudwal's Islands
- Llanstadwell, the name derives from the dedication of the parish and 12th century church to St Tudwal
