= Wilgyth =

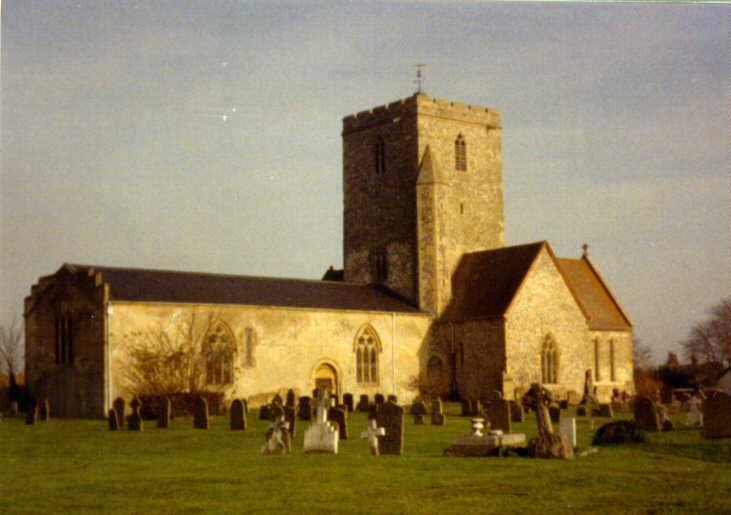
Parish Church at Cholsey

Wilgyth of Cholsey was a 6th-century female monastic saint from Anglo-Saxon England who was venerated locally in Berkshire. She is venerated in Orthodoxy, Roman Catholicism, and Anglicanism.

== Provenance ==
Very little is known of the life of this saint who is known to history through the hagiography of the Secgan Manuscript, and Manuscript R.7.13. held in Trinity College (Cambridge) Library.

== Family ==
She had a (step)brother Bana, founder of a monastery at Le Relecq-Kerhuon in France, and sisters Saints Juthwara and Sidwell, and Eadwara (possibly a nickname of Juthwara) She possibly had other brothers, Paul Aurelian a bishop, Gulval another saint, Pautel and Nautel. If a sister of Paul Aurelian, she would have been the daughter of a Cornish/Welsh chieftain named Perphirius from Penychen in Glamorgan. Legend holds that her mother died while she was quite young and that following the later death of her father, two of her sisters were murdered by her stepmother.
