= Magloire =

Breton saint

St. Magloire
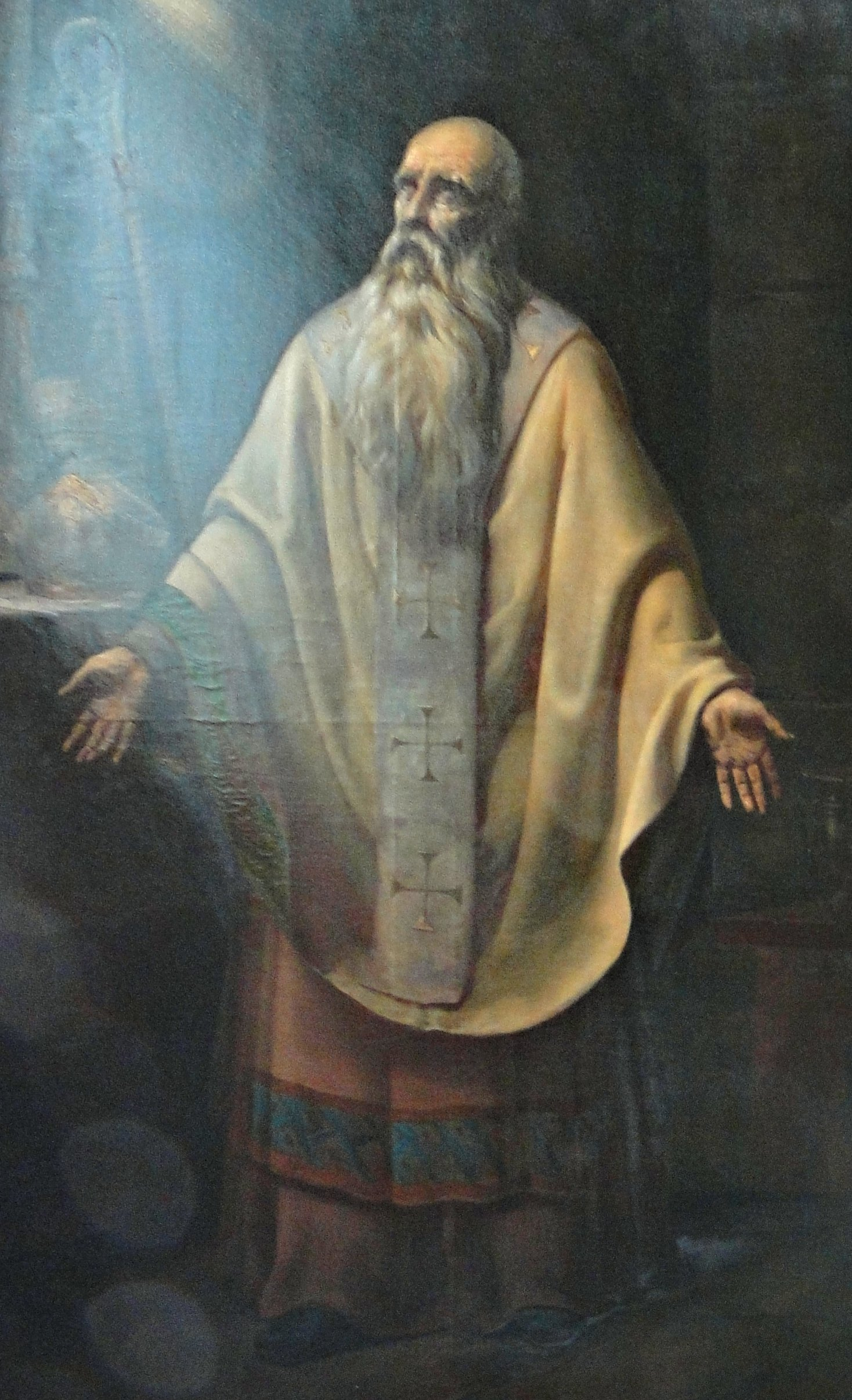
- Saint Magloire of Dol, oil painting by Eugène Goyet (1798–1846), Church Saint-Jacques-du-Haut-Pas in Paris
- Born: 535
- Died: 575
- Venerated in: Roman Catholicism; Orthodox Christianity
- Feast: 24 October

Magloire, better known as Saint Magloire of Dol, is a Breton saint. Little reliable information is known of Magloire as the earliest written sources appeared three centuries after his death. These sources claim that he was a monk from Wales who became the Bishop of Dol-de-Bretagne in Brittany during the 6th century, and ended his life on the island of Sark, where he was abbot of a monastery.

== Biography ==
Although unlikely to contain any reliable biographic information concerning Magloire, the Vita Sancti Maglorii presents a narrative of his life. According to the text, Magloire was born in the early 6th century to Afrelia and Umbrafel, the aunt and uncle of Samson of Dol. As a child, he studied at Cor Tewdws under the tutelage of St. Illtud. After his ordination, he was made abbot of a Lanmeurian monastery where he governed for 52 years. Afterwards, he journeyed to Brittany with his cousin Samson, who became the archbishop of Dol. After Samson's death, Magloire succeeded him as his chosen successor to the archbishopric, although, having received instructions from a visiting angel, he soon resigned his post to Budoc and withdrew to the island of Sark, where he established a community of 62 monks.

According to Butler's dating, he died around 575, but since the hagiography gives no dates, such statements are highly approximate.

== Miracles ==
The Vita Sancti Maglorii attributes several miracles to St. Magloire, and claims that he acquired large swaths of land as a result of these miracles. It argues that Count Loisescon, whose illness was miraculously cured by Magloire, gave him a sixth of all his wealth. It also argues that Nivo, the owner of Guernsey, asked for Magloire's help to cure his daughter who was deaf and intellectually disabled. Magloire was supposedly granted a third of Guernsey for doing so.

One of the most well-known and detailed stories about Magloire concerns his rescue of a group of children. The children were playing in an abandoned wreck on the beach below the monastery when a sudden violent storm swept them out to sea. Magloire is said to have swum out to sea when he heard their cries and saved them and their boat, steering it to the safety of the shore before vanishing.

Other tales include records that he travelled to the island of Jersey and destroyed a dragon, that he resurrected a drowned fisherman of Sark, and that he led the islanders to fight off an anachronistic fleet of Vikings (these may have been proto-Norse raiders). A legend is also told that Magloire had trouble keeping a vow to drink neither wine nor ale, and to fast from all food twice a week. After his struggles, an angelic visitation released him from his vow.

Posthumous miracles of St. Magloire are also included in the surviving texts. After his death, Sark was attacked again by Vikings, who sacked the monastery and killed the monks. When seven of the Vikings attempted to open St. Magloire's tomb, they were blinded, and many of the others turned and began to kill each other.

== Veneration ==
During the reign of Nominoe (846–851), the body of Magloire was stolen by the monks of Lehon Abbey. He was revered by the monks as their primary saint, and it seems likely that the majority of his hagiography was written there in the late 9th century. With an increase in Viking raids in the early 10th century, his relics were transported to Paris by the monks, where Hugh the Great granted them land to establish a new monastery. In 1572, Catherine de' Medici decided to use the site as a home for a group of Benedictine monks who had been expelled from their abbey of Saint-Magloire. In 1620, the seminary of the Oratorians under Pierre de Bérulle—the first seminary in France—replaced the Benedictines. It was known as the seminary of Saint-Magloire. The relics of St. Magloire and his disciples were transferred to the hospital at the site of the Église Saint-Jacques-du-Haut-Pas, which became a monastery. The relics were buried secretly during the French Revolution and were found in 1835, during the installation of a new high altar. St Magloire is one of the four saints surrounding the image of Christon the Pulpit of the Town Church in Guernsey, the others being St Martin, St Peter and St Samson of Dol.

== Hagiography ==
Vita Sancti Maglorii, a work of uncertain provenance written in Latin, details almost all of the knowledge of Maglorius. Folklorist François Duine (1874–1924) called the work a masterpiece of ancient Breton literature. Scholars place its composition between the late 9th century and the mid-10th century. There is also the Translatio Parisios, which recounts the flight of Lehonese monks to Paris in the 10th century, and is the primary source for the foundation of their monastery in Paris. The Vita is untranslated, but is accessible in the Acta Sanctorum series.

== Feast day ==
Magloire is venerated in the Roman Catholic Church and Eastern Orthodox Church on 24 October.

== Sources ==
- Peter Doyle (1996), Butler's Lives of the Saints, pp. 170–1
- Joseph-Claude Poulin (2009), L'hagiographies bretonne du haut Moyen Age, pp. 199–234
