= Pompeia of Langoat =

Breton queen and saint

Saint Pompeia of Langoat
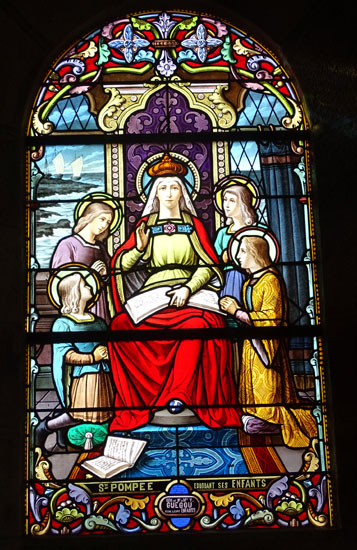
- Stained-glass window featuring Saint Pompeia

Queen of Brittany
- Born: AD 5th century Domnonée, Brittany
- Died: AD 545; Langoat, Brittany
- Venerated in: Roman Catholic Church
- Major shrine: Langoat
- Feast: 2 January
- Attributes: Queen holding a distaff, book at her feet

Saint Pompeia (in Latin: Alma Pompeia or in Breton: Koupaia), also known as Aspasia, is a legendary Breton saint who supposedly lived in the 6th century. Her feast day is celebrated on 2 January.

== Legendary biography ==
According to the life of her son, Tudwal, Pompeia was the sister of King Riwal II of Domnonée. Tradition at Langoat further asserts that she became one of the wives of the King Hoel Mawr (or the Great) of Cournaille and Over-King Brittany. After being exiled in Britain for some years, Pompeia eventually returned to her husband's kingdom with her daughter, Saint Scaeva, and her son, Saint Tudwal. She settled near the monastery of Tréguier, founded by the latter, and died where the church of Langoat stands today. Her relics are still preserved there and a shrine has been erected to her memory.

== Family ==
Saint Pompeia was the mother of:

- Saint Tudwal: one of the seven founding saints of Brittany
- Sainte Scaeva
- Saint Leonorus

== Breton legacy ==
- Langoat: Saint Pompeia's Church in the shape of a Latin cross stands there. Inside is the shrine said to be of Saint Pompeia and bas-relief panels recounting her legend.
- Sainte-Sève: Saint Scaeva's Church there contains a statue of Saint Pompeia; the name of the locality, Trébompé, probably stems from a corruption of the name Pompeia.
- Valley of the Saints: A statue of Saint Pompeia sculpted by P. Le Guen and P. Leost in blue granite from Lanhelin, was erected in 2012.
- Trézény: There is a stained glass window representing Saint Pompeia in the Saint Zény's Church.
