= Aldroen =

Legendary king of the Bretons of Armorica in the 5th century

- Born: c. 393
- Died: c. 464
- Other names: Aldroenus, Aldroein, Aldrien, Adroenus, Audren
- Known for: Legendary king of the Bretons of Armorica

Aldroen (Aldrien or Audren or Aldor in Gaulish) (393 – 464) was a legendary king of the Bretons of Armorica.

== Legendary biography ==
Aldroen appears in Geoffrey of Monmouth's 12th-century Historia regum Britanniae as Aldroenus, the "fourth king after Conan" to rule over Brittany. Archbishop Guithelin of London offered him the throne of the island of Britain which he refused, but he sent his younger brother Constantine with 2,000 men to free it from Picts and Huns, and Constantine became king under the name of Constantine II.

In Old Gaulish he was called Aldroen ap Selyfan, meaning "son of Salomon". He is therefore considered the son of Salomon I of Armorica, 1st king of Brittany, and of Flavia ferch Patricius Flavius, meaning "Flavia daughter of the patrician Flavius" in Gallic. According to tradition, he took up arms against the Romans and drove them out of Nantes, Guérande, Saint-Malo and Léon, and then advanced into the Orléanais.

He married an Irish princess and the historian Pierre-Hyacinthe Morice de Beaubois (Dom Morice) recorded as his children:

- Eric of Cornwall
- Emrys/Eusebius of Vannes
- Llydaw/Budic of Armorica

The Cambrian or second Meigant was son of Gwyndaf hen, son of Emyr Llydaw (i.e., Ambrose of Letavia, or Armorica), the nephew of St. German, Bishop of Man, by his sister, the wife of Aldor, or Aldroen, King of Armorica.

== Legendary founder of Châtelaudren ==
According to the 15th-century Cronicques et ystoires des Bretons by Pierre Le Baud:

And, says the teller of Arthur's history, Audroan was then in a notable castle located in a valley of the Trocorente region that is called Herile, which castle the vulgar still call by the name of the Royal Castle Audroen.

In a more recent work Stéphane Morin challenges the role attributed by tradition to Aldroen of founder of the city of Châtelaudren:

Whatever the ancient chroniclers of the late Middle Ages say, the supposed foundation of Châtelaudren in the 5th century by King Audren, a reputed descendant and 3rd successor of Conan Meriadoc, seems to have to be relegated to the rank of legend.

== See also ==
- Armoricani
- Breton language
- History of Brittany
- List of Legendary Kings of Armorica
- List of monarchs of Brittany
