= Leonorus =

Welsh monk

Saint Leonorus
- Born: Wales
- Residence: Pontual in Brittany
- Died: 560; Brittany
- Feast: 1 July

Saint Leonorus (or Leonorious, Leonorius, Léonor, Lunaire; died 560) was a Welsh monk who was active in Brittany.

== Life ==
Saint Leonorus was born in Wales, son of King Hoel I and Saint Koupaïa (Pompeia of Langoat). He was consecrated as a bishop by Saint Dubricius. He founded a monastery at Pontual to the south of Loctudy, Brittany. He is said to have hung his coat on a sunbeam. He died about 570. His feast day is 1 July.

== Monks of Ramsgate account ==
The monks of St Augustine's Abbey, Ramsgate, wrote in their Book of Saints (1921),

Leonorius (St.) Bp. (July 1)
(6th cent.) A son of Hoel, King of Brittany, but born in England, educated by Saint Illtyd, and consecrated Bishop by Saint Dubritius of Caerleon. Crossing to Brittany, then ruled over by his brother Hoel, he founded a monastery, and closed a useful life by a holy death (A.D. 560).

== Owen's account ==
Robert Owen (1820–1902) in his Sanctorale Catholicum under July 1 wrote,

In Britanny, that of S. LEONORUS bishop and confessor. He was the son of a noble Briton in Wales Hloëloc by his wife Alma-Pompa. (Note: Gwen-hwyvar?) A disciple of S. Iltutus, be was made a bishop by S. Dubricius, and set sail for Armorica with many monks. A storm arose, and they flung every thing over board, and even Leonorus' altar; but two snow-white doves (saith the legend) brought it back to him. Landing in Britanny they began presently with great labour to clear the forest; when a white sparrow brought an ear of corn in his beak, and led them to a fertile ground. They sowed; and as time went on, Leonorus, going to see how the crop grew, discovered something like a golden ram, laid open by the working of the moles. This he gave to Childebert king of France, (as it was worth three thousand silver pieces); who in return gave Leonorus as much land as the sound of the bishop's bell would reach when set on a high hill. The saint protected Idwal (Judicaël) from the pursuit of his cruel enemy Commor, Count of Cornouailles; who in a rage having smitten him on the face forthwith broke his limb, and died in torment. (Note: From the ancient Breviary of S. Malo, in Bolland. Bréton accounts make Leonorus as well as Commor to be the sons of Howel I, or Riwallon. His name 'Léonpr-le-Gallois.' as borne by a French writer, the Sieur De Grimarest5, implies he was a native of Wales.)

== Butler's account ==
The hagiographer Alban Butler (1710–1773) wrote in his Lives of the Fathers, Martyrs, and Other Principal Saints, under July 1,

St. Leonorus, in French Lunaire, B.
He was of a noble family in Wales, and educated under the care of St. Iltut; and passing over into that part of France called the province of Domnone, he founded a monastery between the rivers of Rancé and Arguenon, on a piece of ground which was given him by Jona, the lord of the country. His many extraordinary virtues drew the attention of king Childebert, who very pressingly invited him to Paris, where he was received by this prince and his royal consort Ultrogotha with every possible demonstration of the highest respect. At his return he had the affliction to hear that his protector Jona was stripped of his possessions, and murdered by Conomor. Happily however he arrived time enough to shelter that unfortunate nobleman’s son Judual from the bloody tyrant’s cruelty, and conveyed him safely to England: whence Judual afterwards returned, and recovered his inheritance. This saint is styled bishop, though he had no fixed see; for it was then an established custom in Brittany to honour the principal abbots with the episcopal dignity. The year in which St. Leonorus died is not known. His body was translated to a parochial church near St. Malo, which still retains the name of St. Lunaire: here his tomb is shown, which is empty, his relics being inclosed in a shrine. The feast of his translation is on the 13th of October, but he is principally honoured in the several diocesses of Brittany on the 1st of July. He is patron of many churches. See the Breviary of Leon, of the abbey of St. Meen, &c., also Lobineau, Vies des SS. de Bretagne, p. 91, and the Martyrology of Usuard.

== Sources ==
- Bevington, Helen (1983), The Journey is Everything: A Journal of the Seventies, Duke University Press, ISBN 978-0-8223-0553-8
- Butler, Alban (1833), The Lives of the Fathers, Martyrs, and Other Principal Saints: Compiled from Original Monuments and Other Authentic Records, Illustrated with the Remarks of Judicious Modern Critics and Historians, vol. VII, R. Coyne This article incorporates text from this source, which is in the public domain.
- Owen, Robert (1880), Sanctorale Catholicum, Or, Book of Saints: With Notes Critical, Exegetical, and Historical, Kegan Paul
- "Saint Leonorious of Brittany", CatholicSaints.info
- St. Augustine's Abbey, Ramsgate (1921), The Book of saints : a dictionary of servants of God canonized by the Catholic Church, London: A. & C. Black, ltd. This article incorporates text from this source, which is in the public domain.
