= Budic I of Brittany =

Budic I of Brittany (born c. 420) was the king of Brittany, inheriting the title over the territory from his father, Aldroen of Brittany.

== Biography ==
There is not extensive information on the life of Budic I of Brittany, but sources are able to confirm a few details of his life. It is possible that in the early portion of his reign, he ruled together with his brother Maxent of Brittany. After the murder of Constantine, Budic I's uncle and a majority of his family, Constantine's two sons found sanctuary at Budic's court. This attack was allegedly perpetrated by Vortigern, governor of the city of Dubris, one of the most important ports in the kingdom. Vortigern had formed a pact with the powerful Jute kings, Hengist and Horsa. The two youths, Ambrosius Aurelianus and Uthyr Pendragon, were both heirs to the throne of Sub-Roman Britain. It is likely that the contemporary usurper to the throne, Vortigern wished them dead so self-imposed exile for their own safety would be the likely explanation for this move. Upon reaching maturity, the two would travel again to Britain where they would seek to regain their titles to the throne.

Budic I was succeeded as King of Brittany by his son, Meliau of Brittany.

== Marriage and descendants ==
Budic married a woman named Anaumide and the couple had the following children:

- Meliau of Brittany (b. c. 470 - d. ?)– who would go on to become the next king, inheriting his father's land and titles
- Riwal of Brittany – who would become king after the death of Meliau.

Budic I of Brittany Born: c. 420 Died: ?
Regnal titles
| Preceded by Aldrien of Brittany | King of Brittany | Succeeded by Meliau of Brittany |
