= Sevira, daughter of Maximus =

Purported daughter of the Roman Emperor Magnus Maximus

Sevira (a Vulgar Latin spelling of the Classical Latin name Severa) was a purported daughter of the Roman Emperor Magnus Maximus and wife of Vortigern. She was mentioned on the fragmentary, mid-ninth century C.E. Latin inscription of the Pillar of Eliseg in the ancient commote of Yale, near Valle Crucis Abbey, Denbighshire, Wales.

The inscription was commissioned by Cyngen ap Cadell (died 855), king of Powys, in honour of his great-grandfather Elisedd ap Gwylog (reign 725–755), who is here claimed to be a descendant of "Britu son of Vortigern, whom Germanus blessed, and whom Sevira bore to him, daughter of Maximus the king, who killed the king of the Romans."

The Pillar of Eliseg inscription is the only known source for a daughter of Magnus Maximus specifically named Sevira (or Severa). However, Geoffrey Ashe noted in 1960 that "A letter of St. Ambrose gives us a scrap of information about [Maximus's] daughters. After his fall they were thrown on the charity of Theodosius, who magnanimously provided for their education." Both the number and the names of these daughters are unrecorded in surviving sources.
