= Vortigern =

5th-century ruler in Sub-Roman Britain

- Matter of Britain character
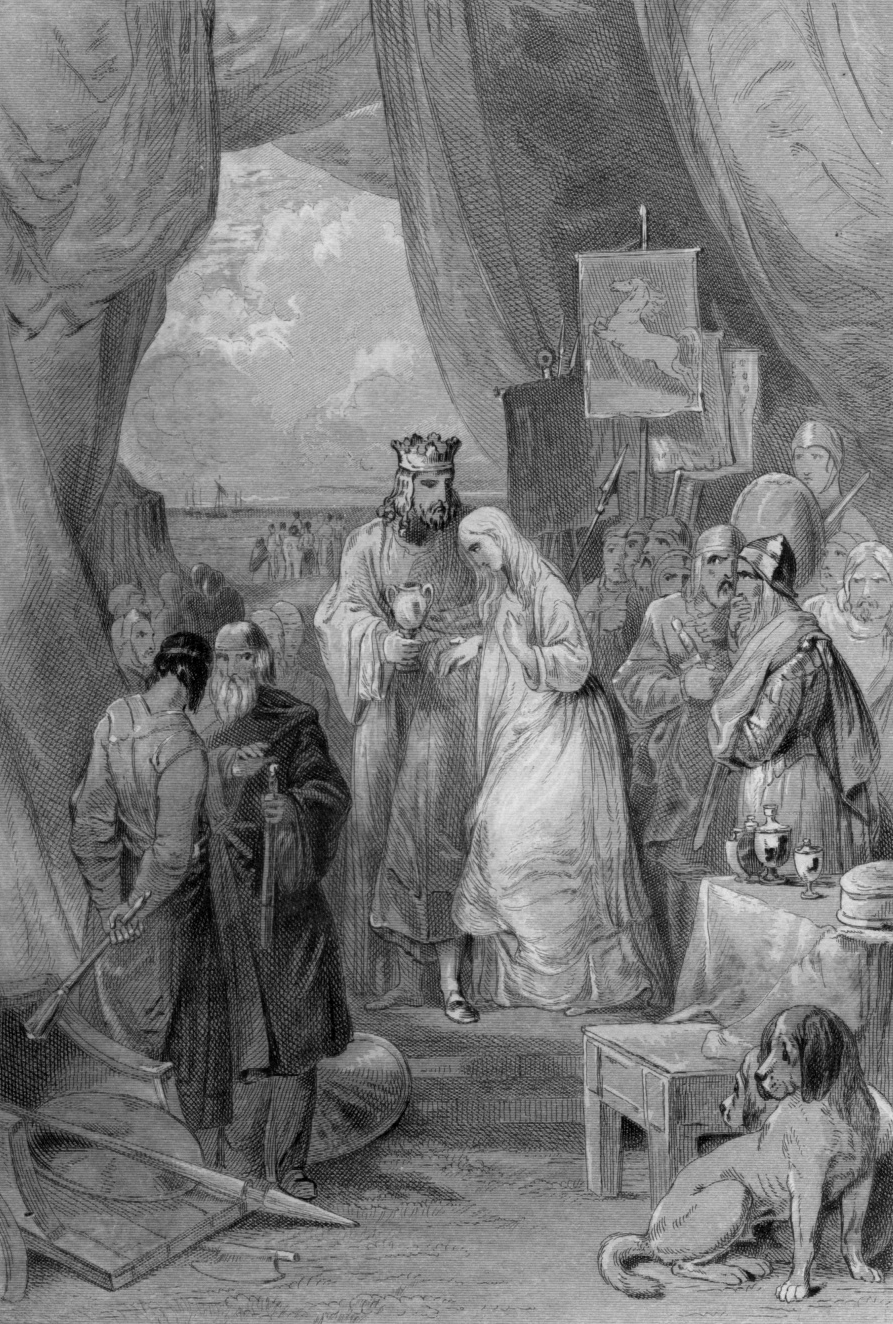
- Vortigern and Rowena by William Harvey
- First appearance: "De Excidio et Conquestu Britanniae"; 'Historia Brittonum'; 6th–9th century traditions
- Last appearance: 'Historia Regum Britanniae'; 12th century
- Created by: Early British chroniclers
- Based on: Possible historical British ruler
- Portrayed by: Jude Law (King Arthur: Legend of the Sword)

In-universe information
- Occupation: King, warlord, ruler of Britain
- Family: Vortimer (son); Catigern (son, in some traditions)
- Spouse: Rowena (in later legends)
- Relatives: Hengist (father-in-law in some versions)
- Religion: Christianity (nominally)

Vortigern (/ˈvɔːrtɪdʒɜːrn/ or /-ɡɜːrn/; Old Welsh: Guorthigirn, Guorthegern; Welsh: Gwrtheyrn; Old English: Wyrtgeorn; Old Breton: Gurdiern, Gurthiern; Cornish: Gourdhern; Irish: Foirtchern; Latin: Vortigernus, Vertigernus, Uuertigernus, etc.), also spelt Vortiger, Vortigan, Voertigern and Vortigen, was a 5th-century warlord in Britain, known perhaps as a king of the Britons or at least connoted as such in the writings of Bede. His existence is contested by scholars and information about him is obscure. He also appears in some manuscripts of De Excidio et Conquestu Britanniae by Gildas, and it is debated whether the name Vortigern was in the authorial version.

Bede associates him with the proud tyrant ("superbus tyrannus") said in Gildas to have invited the Saxons (who Bede, but not Gildas, says were led by Hengist and Horsa) to aid him in fighting the Picts and the Scots, whereupon they revolted, killing his son in the process and forming the Kingdom of Kent. It is said that he took refuge in North Wales, and that his grave was in Dyfed or the Llŷn Peninsula. Gildas later denigrated the proud tyrant for his misjudgement and also blamed him for the loss of Britain. He is cited at the beginning of the genealogy of the early Kings of Powys.

== Medieval accounts ==
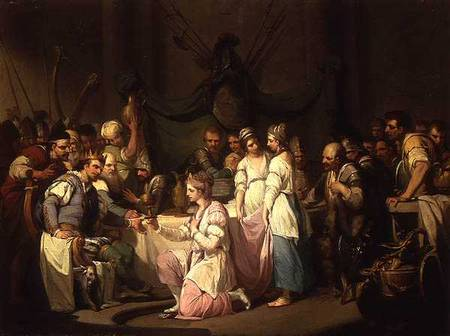
Meeting of Vortigern and Rowena painted by William Hamilton

=== Gildas ===
The cleric and polemicist Gildas wrote De Excidio et Conquestu Britanniae (On the Ruin and Conquest of Britain) in the last decades of the fifth century or the first decades of the sixth century. It is described by the historian François Kerlouégan as "the only witness of any stature to give information about the still little-known world of sub-Roman Britain". Gildas describes the devastation wrought by invasions of Picts and Scots after the Romans left Britain, and condemns what he sees as the disastrous error of inviting the Saxons in as mercenary defenders. Gildas writes, in a translation by Michael Winterbottom:

Then the members of the council, together with the proud tyrant, were struck blind; the guard - or rather the method of destruction - they devised for our land was that the ferocious Saxons (name not to be spoken!), hated by man and God, should be let into the island like wolves into the fold, to beat back the peoples of the north.

Winterbottom's translation is based on an edition by Theodor Mommsen in 1894 of the earliest surviving text of De Excidio, a Canterbury manuscript dating to the tenth century, which does not mention Vortigern. Two other texts of De Excidio preserved in Continental manuscripts do mention Vortigern as the "proud tyrant", but the principal one is in poor textual condition and Mommsen ignored it as being inferior. Until the 1970s, scholars thought that Gildas did not name Vortigern on the basis of Mommsen's edition, but in 1977 David Dumville argued that the Continental texts may be superior to the Canterbury one, and that a new analysis of the texts is needed which might well conclude that Vortigern is named in Gildas's original text.

Dumville's comment that a new analysis is needed has been accepted by Winterbottom, who stated that he was using Mommsen's edition as the best then available, and by E. A. Thompson, who cited Dumville's article and commented that it may be clear whether Vortigern's name should be inserted in De Excidio when a new edition becomes available. Historians think that the case for thinking that Gildas referred to Vortigern is strengthened by the fact that Vortigern means something like "high king" in Old Welsh, and "proud tyrant" is thought to be a typical Gildasian word play on Vortigern's name.

=== Bede ===
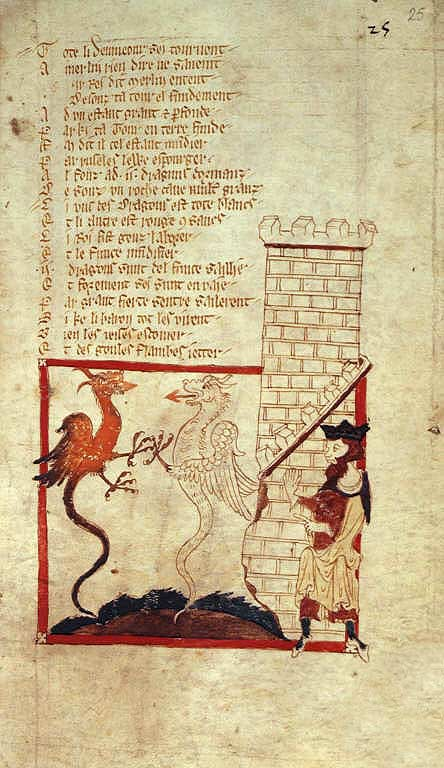
Vortigern's Tower in a 14th century illuminated manuscript of Wace's Roman de Brut

The first extant text considering Gildas' account is Bede, writing in the early- to mid-8th century. He mostly paraphrases Gildas in his Ecclesiastical History of the English People and The Reckoning of Time, adding several details, perhaps most importantly the name of this "proud tyrant", whom he first calls Vertigernus (in his Chronica Maiora) and later Vurtigernus (in his Historia Ecclesiastica Gentis Anglorum). The Vertigernus form may reflect an earlier Celtic source or a lost version of Gildas. Bede also gives names in the Historia to the leaders of the Saxons, Hengist and Horsa, specifically identifying their tribes as the Saxons, Angles and Jutes (H.E., 1.14–15). Another significant detail that Bede adds to Gildas' account is calling Vortigern the king of the British people.

Bede also supplies the date, 449, which was traditionally accepted but has been considered suspect since the late 20th century: "Marcian being made emperor with Valentinian, and the forty-sixth from Augustus, ruled the empire seven years." Michael Jones notes that there are several arrival dates in Bede. In H.E. 1.15 the arrival occurs within the period 449–455; in 1.23 and 5.23 another date, c. 446, is given; and in 2.14 the same event is dated 446 or 447, suggesting that these dates are calculated approximations.

=== Historia Brittonum ===
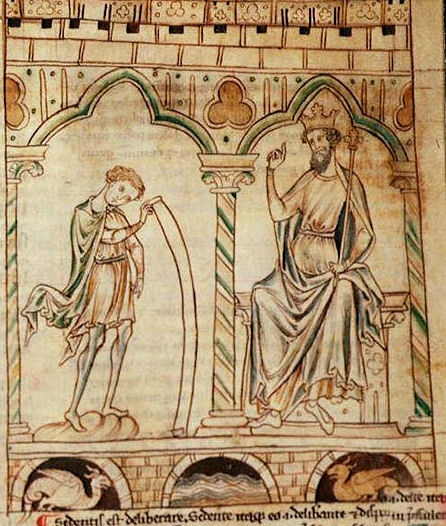
Merlin reads his prophecies to King Vortigern. British Library MS Cotton Claudius B VII f.224, Geoffrey of Monmouth's Prophetiae Merlini.

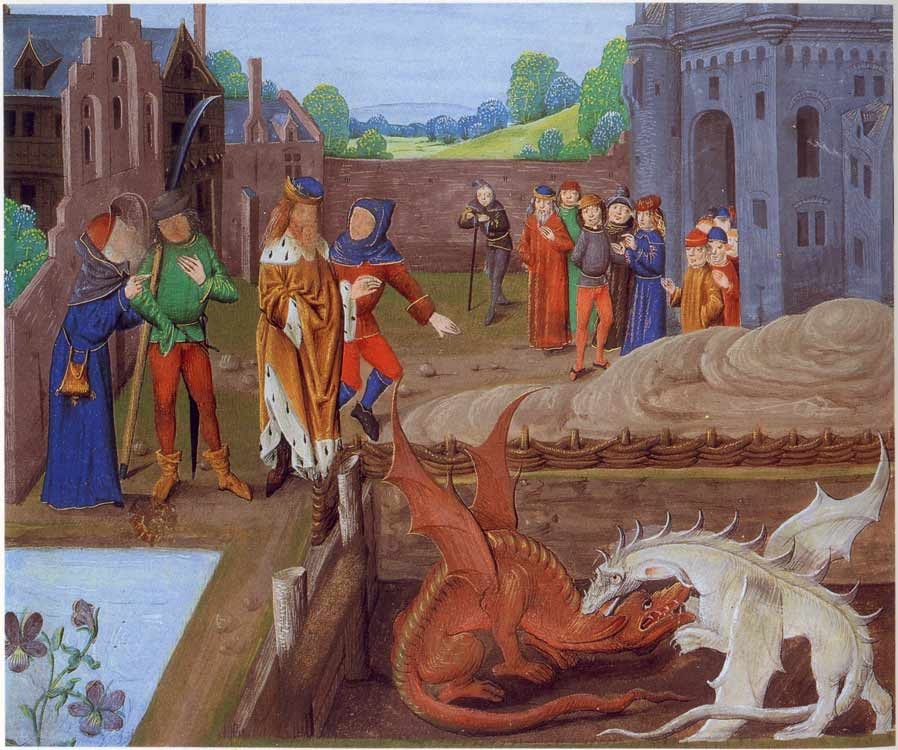
Illustration in a fifteenth-century manuscript of Geoffrey of Monmouth's Historia Regum Britanniae (c. 1136). Vortigern and Merlin watch two dragons fighting. The red dragon represents the British and the white one the Saxons.

The Historia Brittonum (History of the Britons) was attributed until recently to Nennius, a monk from Bangor, Gwynedd, and was probably compiled during the early 9th century. The writer mentions a great number of sources. Nennius wrote more negatively of Vortigern, accusing him of incest (perhaps confusing Vortigern with the Welsh king Vortiporius, accused by Gildas of the same crime), oath-breaking, treason, love for a pagan woman, and lesser vices such as pride.

The Historia Brittonum recounts many details about Vortigern and his sons. Chapters 31–49 tell how Vortigern (Guorthigirn) deals with the Saxons and Saint Germanus of Auxerre. Chapters 50–55 deal with Saint Patrick. Chapter 56 tells about King Arthur and his battles. Chapters 57–65 mention English genealogies, mingled with English and Welsh history. Chapter 66 gives important chronological calculations, mostly on Vortigern and the Anglo-Saxon settlement of Britain.

Excluding what is taken from Gildas, there are a number of traditions:

- Material quoted from a Life of Saint Germanus. These excerpts describe Germanus of Auxerre's incident with one Benlli, an inhospitable host seemingly unrelated to Vortigern who comes to an untimely end, but his servant provides hospitality and is made the progenitor of the kings of Powys. They also describe Vortigern's son by his own daughter, whom Germanus raises, and Vortigern's own end caused by fire from heaven.

It has been suggested that the saint mentioned here may be no more than a local saint or a tale that had to explain all the holy places dedicated to a St. Germanus or a "Garmon", who may have been a Powys saint or even a bishop from the Isle of Man about the time of writing the Historia Brittonum. The story seems only to be explained as a slur against the rival dynasty of Powys, suggesting that they did not descend from Vortigern but from a mere slave.

- A number of calculations attempting to fix the year when Vortigern invited the Saxons into Britain. These are made by the writer, naming interesting persons and calculating their dates, making several mistakes in the process.
- Genealogical material about Vortigern's ancestry, including the names of his four sons (Vortimer, Pascent, Catigern, and Faustus), his father Vitalis, his grandfather Vitalinus, and his great-grandfather Gloui, who is probably just an eponym which associates Vortigern with Glevum, the civitas of Gloucester.
- The story of why Vortigern granted land in Britain to the Saxons, first to Thanet in exchange for service as foederati troops, then to the rest of Kent in exchange for marriage to Hengest's daughter, then to Essex and Sussex after a banquet where the Saxons treacherously slew all of the leaders of the British but saved Vortigern to extract this ransom.
- The tale of Ambrosius Aurelianus and the two dragons found beneath Dinas Emrys.

The Historia Brittonum relates four battles occurring in Kent, apparently related to material in the Anglo-Saxon Chronicle (see below). It claims that Vortigern's son Vortimer commanded the Britons against Hengest's Saxons. Moreover, it claims that the Saxons were driven out of Britain, only to return at Vortigern's invitation a few years later, after the death of Vortimer.

The stories preserved in the Historia Brittonum reveal an attempt by one or more anonymous British scholars to provide more detail to this story, while struggling to accommodate the facts of the British tradition.

=== The Anglo-Saxon Chronicle ===
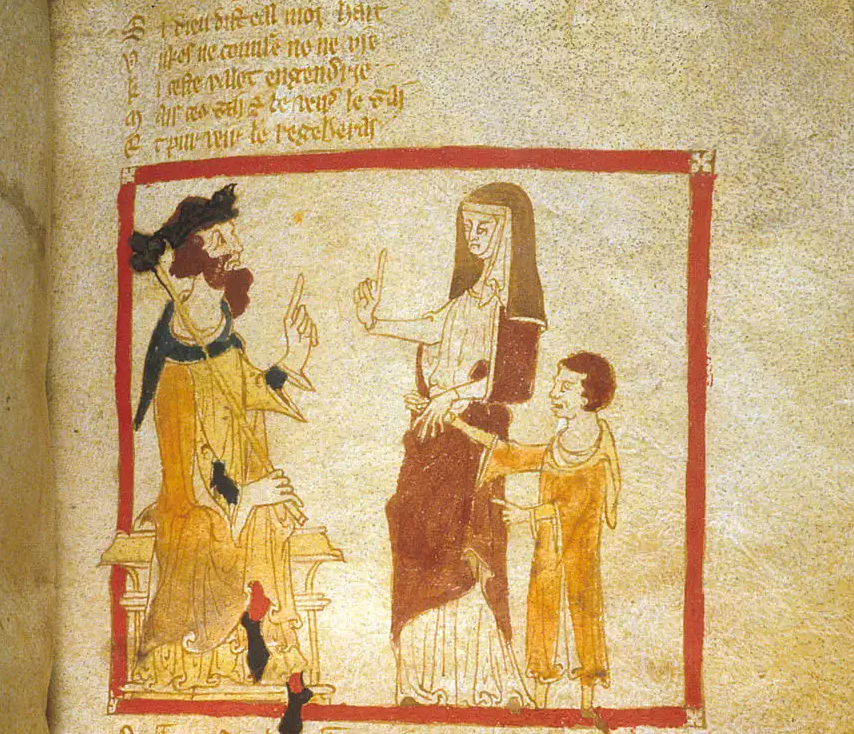
Merlin and his mother before king Vortigern

The Anglo-Saxon Chronicle provides dates and locations of four battles which Hengest and his brother Horsa fought against the British in the county of Kent. Vortigern is said to have been the commander of the British for only the first battle; the opponents in the next three battles are variously termed "British" and "Welsh", which is not unusual for this part of the Chronicle. The Chronicle locates the Battle of Wippedesfleot as the place where the Saxons first landed, dated 465 in Wippedsfleot and thought to be Ebbsfleet near Ramsgate. The year 455 is the last date when Vortigern is mentioned.

The annals for the 5th century in the Chronicle were put into their current form during the 9th century, probably during the reign of Alfred the Great. The sources are obscure for the fifth century annals; however, an analysis of the text demonstrates some poetic conventions, so it is probable that they were derived from an oral tradition such as sagas in the form of epic poems.

There is dispute as to when the material was written which comprises the Historia Brittonum, and it could be later than the Chronicle. Some historians argue that the Historia Brittonum took its material from a source close to the Chronicle.

=== William of Malmesbury ===
Writing soon before Geoffrey of Monmouth, William of Malmesbury added much to the unfavourable assessment of Vortigern:

At this time Vortigern was King of Britain; a man calculated neither for the field nor the council, but wholly given up to the lusts of the flesh, the slave of every vice: a character of insatiable avarice, ungovernable pride, and polluted by his lusts. To complete the picture, he had defiled his own daughter, who was lured to the participation of such a crime by the hope of sharing his kingdom, and she had borne him a son. Regardless of his treasures at this dreadful juncture, and wasting the resources of the kingdom in riotous living, he was awake only to the blandishments of abandoned women.

— Gesta Regum Anglorum

William does, however, add some detail, no doubt because of a good local knowledge, in De Gestis Regum Anglorum book I, chapter 23.

=== Geoffrey of Monmouth ===
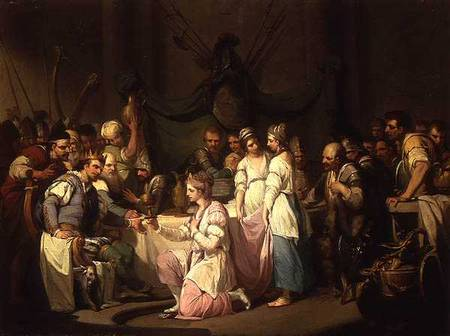
The First Meeting of Vortigern and Rowena, painted by William Hamilton

The story of Vortigern adopted its best-known form in Geoffrey's pseudohistorical Historia Regum Britanniae. Geoffrey names Constans the older brother of Aurelius Ambrosius and Uther Pendragon. After the death of their father, Constantinus III, Vortigern persuades Constans to leave his monastery and claim the throne. Constans proved a weak and unpopular puppet monarch and Vortigern ruled the country through him until he finally managed Constans' death by insurgent Picts.

Geoffrey mentions a similar tale just before that episode, however, which may be an unintentional duplication. Just after the Romans leave, the archbishop of London is put forward by the representatives of Britain to organise the island's defences. To do so, he arranges for continental soldiers to come to Britain. The name of the bishop is Guitelin, a name similar to the Vitalinus mentioned in the ancestry of Vortigern and to the Vitalinus said to have fought with Ambrosius at the Battle of Guoloph. This Guithelin/Vitalinus disappears from the story as soon as Vortigern arrives. All these coincidences imply that Geoffrey duplicated the story of the invitation of the Saxons, and that the tale of Guithelinus the archbishop might possibly give some insight into the background of Vortigern before his acquisition of power.

Geoffrey identifies Hengest's daughter as Rowena. After Vortigern marries her, his sons rebel. Geoffrey adds that Vortigern was succeeded briefly by his son Vortimer, as does the Historia Brittonum, only to assume the throne again when Vortimer is killed.

== Pillar of Eliseg ==
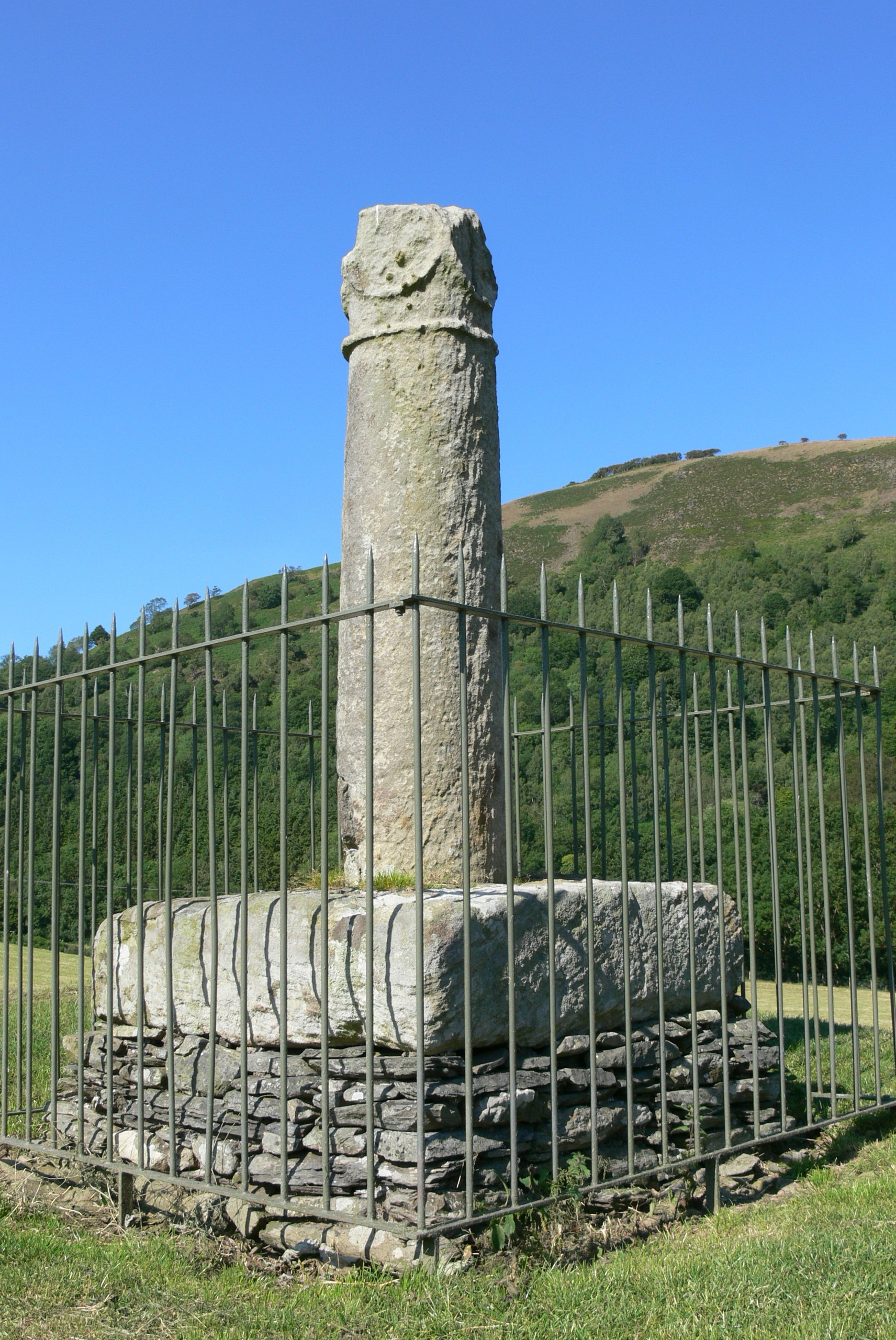
The Pillar of Eliseg

The inscription on the Pillar of Eliseg, a mid-9th century stone cross in Llangollen, northern Wales, gives the Old Welsh spelling of Vortigern: Guarthi[gern], (the inscription is now damaged and the final letters of the name are missing), believed to be the same person as Gildas's "superbus tyrannus", Vortigern. The pillar also states that he was married to Sevira, the daughter of Magnus Maximus, and gave a line of descent leading to the royal family of Powys, who erected the cross. Some historians, notably Nikolai Tolstoy and David Dumville, have declared this connection either a doubtful tradition or Powysian propaganda.

== Vortigern as title rather than personal name ==
It has occasionally been suggested by scholars that Vortigern might be a royal title, rather than a personal name. The name in Brittonic literally means "Great King" or "Overlord", composed of the elements *wor- "over-, super" and *tigerno- "king, lord, chief, ruler" (compare Old Breton machtiern, Cornish myghtygern a type of local ruler – literally "pledge chief") in medieval Brittany and Cornwall.

== Local legends ==
A valley on the north coast of the Llŷn Peninsula, known as Nant Gwrtheyrn or "Vortigern's Gorge", is named after Vortigern, and until modern times had a small barrow known locally as "Vortigern's Grave", along with a ruin known as "Vortigern's Fort". However, this conflicts with doubtful reports that he died in his castle on the River Teifi in Dyfed ("Nennius") or his tower at The Doward in Herefordshire (Geoffrey of Monmouth).

Other fortifications associated with Vortigern are at Arfon in Gwynedd, Bradford on Avon in Wiltshire, Carn Fadryn in Gwynedd, Clwyd in Powys, Llandysul in Dyfed, Old Carlisle in Cumberland, Old Sarum in Wiltshire, Rhayader in Powys, Snowdon and Stonehenge in Wiltshire.

== Later portrayals ==
Vortigern's story remained well known after the Middle Ages, especially in Great Britain. He is a major character in two Jacobean plays, the anonymous The Birth of Merlin and Thomas Middleton's Hengist, King of Kent, first published in 1661. His meeting with Rowena became a popular subject in 17th-century engraving and painting, e.g., William Hamilton's 1793 work Vortigern and Rowena. He was also featured in literature, such as John Lesslie Hall's poems about the beginnings of England.

One of Vortigern's most notorious literary appearances is in the play Vortigern and Rowena, which was promoted as a lost work of William Shakespeare when it first emerged in 1796. However, it was soon revealed as a literary forgery written by the play's purported discoverer, William Henry Ireland, who had previously forged a number of other Shakespearean manuscripts. The play was at first accepted as Shakespeare's by some in the literary community, and received a performance at London's Drury Lane Theatre on 2 April 1796. The play's crude writing, however, exposed it as a forgery, and it was laughed off stage and not performed again. Ireland eventually admitted to the hoax and tried to publish the play by his own name, but had little success.

Legendary titles
Unknown	Consul of the Gewisseans	Unknown
Preceded by Constans	King of Britain first reign	Succeeded by Vortimer
Preceded by Vortimer	King of Britain second reign	Succeeded by Ambrosius Aurelianus
Preceded by Vitalis	King of Powys c. 418 – c. 435	Succeeded by Catigern
