= Morgan le Fay in modern culture =

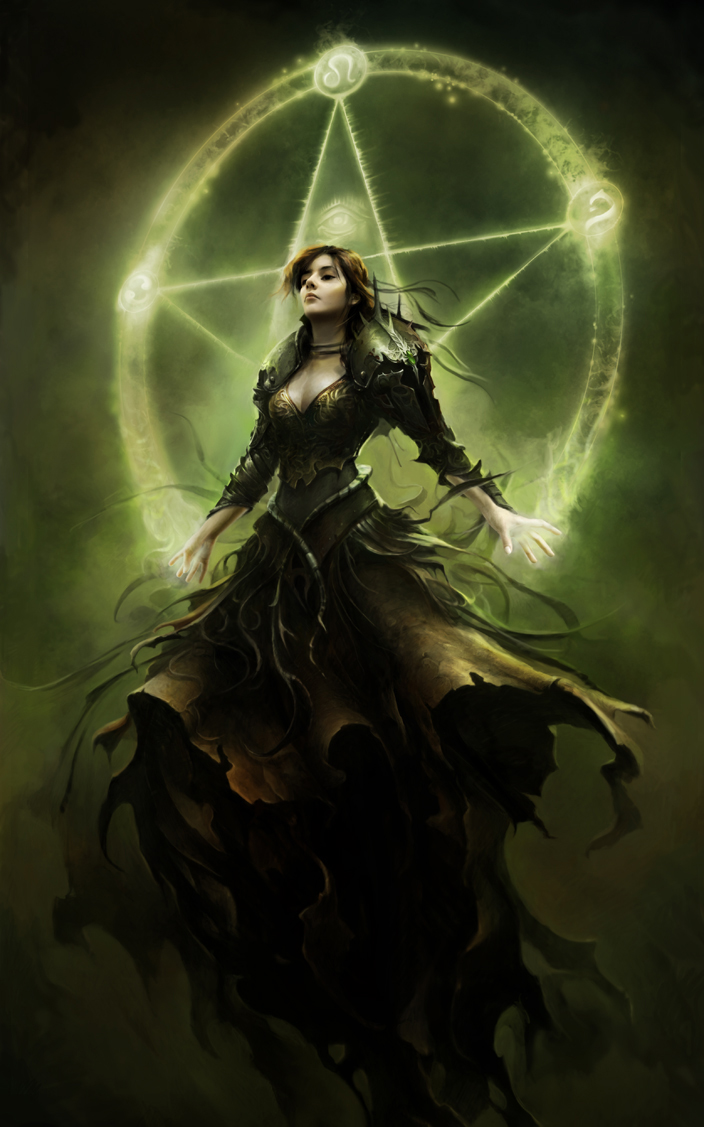
Morgana Le Fay, Anikó Salamon's art for the video game King Arthur II: The Role-Playing Wargame (2012)

The Matter of Britain character Morgan le Fay (often known as Morgana, and sometimes also as Morgaine and other names) has been featured many times in various works of modern culture, often but not always appearing in villainous roles. Some modern stories merge Morgana's character with her sister Morgause or with aspects of Nimue (the Lady of the Lake). Her manifestations and the roles given to her by modern authors vary greatly, but typically she is being portrayed as a villainess associated with Mordred.

Her stereotypical image, then, is of a seductive, megalomaniacal, power-hungry sorceress who wishes to rule Camelot and overthrow King Arthur, and is a fierce rival of the mage Merlin. Contemporary interpretations of the Arthurian myth sometimes assign to Morgana the role of seducing Arthur and giving birth to the wicked knight Mordred, though traditionally his mother was Morgause, Morgana's sister; in these works Mordred is often her pawn, used to bring about the end of the Arthurian age. Examples of modern Arthurian works featuring Morgana in the role of a major antagonist include characters in both the DC Comics (Morgaine le Fey) and Marvel Comics (Morgan le Fay) comic book universes. Some other Arthurian fiction, however, casts Morgana in the various positive or at least more ambivalent roles, and some have her as a protagonist and sometimes a narrator.

== Overview ==
Morgan le Fay has become ubiquitous in Arthurian works of modern culture, spanning mostly fantasy and historical fiction across various mediums including literature, comics, film, and television. As Elizabeth S. Sklar noted in 1992: "Currently a cornerstone of the new Arthurian mythos, [she] occupies a secure position in the contemporary Arthurian pantheon, as familiar a figure to modern enthusiasts as Merlin, Lancelot, or King Arthur himself." Additionally, she has become an archetype serving as a source of tropes for many characters in other modern works, some of them borrowing her name in the form Morgana. As in the case of other modern Arthuriana, Le Morte d'Arthur is the dominant source today.

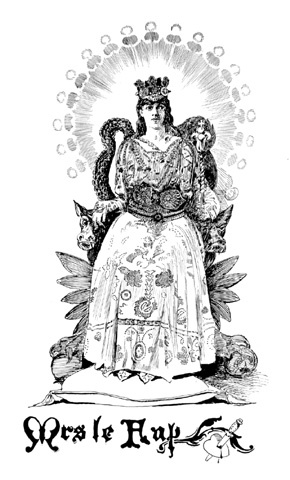
Dan Beard's illustration for the original edition of A Connecticut Yankee in King Arthur's Court (1889) "He was nothing, this so-called king: the queen was the only power there."

Prior to her 20th-century resurgence, however, Morgan had been largely absent from modern Arthuriana. The relatively few exceptions of an actual Morgan character include William Morris's epic poem The Earthly Paradise (1870), retelling the story of Morgan and Ogier the Dane. In his popular and often-adapted satirical novel A Connecticut Yankee in King Arthur's Court (1889), Mark Twain cast Morgan le Fay as a deceptively charmful representative of feudal corruption, who is also capable of the most vicious behavior and flirts with the time-travelling protagonist Hank Morgan, her namesake and essentially similar character or even a double (one film adaptation, A Knight in Camelot, stars Whoopi Goldberg as the female protagonist Vivien Morgan who is the only Morgan character in this version, sharing her first name also with one of the names of the Lady of the Lake; Kim Iverson Headlee also wrote the book's continuation novel from Morgan le Fay's own perspective, King Arthur's Sister in Washington's Court).

Since the early 20th century, most modern works feature Morgan as a sorceress and sometimes a priestess, and usually a half-sister of Arthur and sometimes a femme fatale, but some also have her in other roles, including as a fairy or an otherwise non-human character. Many authors effectively merge Morgan with Morgause (traditionally a sister of Morgan and the mother of Mordred from an incestuous union with their brother Arthur) and combine her with the less savory aspects of the Lady of the Lake (this is further positioning a modern Morgan as a nemesis for Merlin, who has never been truly her foe in the medieval Arthurian lore). Such a composite character is then often turned into Mordred's mother or partner. An early instance of such simplifications used to "streamline the plot" was Henry Irving's 1895 stage production King Arthur originally written by W. G. Wills.

Modern authors' versions of Morgan have her usually appear in conventionally villainous roles of a witchlike and irreconcilable enemy of Arthur, recurrently in league with Arthur's bastard son Mordred; be it in the time of the legend or still continuing her feud in the modern era, where she also may be just ruthlessly questing for power or even represent motiveless malevolence. Such Morgan is often devoid of nuances as a merely one-dimensional caricature, examples of which include the portrayals of her in several television films such as Merlin and the Sword (1985, played by Candice Bergen), A Connecticut Yankee in King Arthur's Court (1995, played by Theresa Russell) and Arthur's Quest (1999, played by Catherine Oxenberg). According to Kevin J. Harty, already in the 1953 film Knights of the Round Table she did exhibit "the sexual wiles as well as the deceit and jealousy by now stereotypical for her character." Sklar described a modern stereotype of Morgan as "the very embodiment of evil dedicated to the subversion of all forms of governance, express[ing] the fears that inevitably accompany the sort of radical cultural change represented by the social realities and ideological imperatives of escalating female empowerment during this (20th) century...a composite of all the patriarchal nightmare-women of literary tradition: Eve, Circe, Medea and Lady Macbeth compressed into a single, infinitely menacing package," and whose "sexuality exceeds even that of her prototype and serves as the chief vehicle for her manipulation of others." Notable examples of this pattern are two comic book supervillainesses, Morgan le Fay (created by Stan Lee and Joe Maneely in 1955) in the Marvel Universe and Morgaine le Fey (created by Jack Kirby in 1972) in the DC Universe. A modern Morgan is often an antagonist character for Arthur, Merlin and their followers to overcome and save Camelot, Avalon, or the entire world. Even in Excalibur (1981), John Boorman's film adaptation of Le Morte d'Arthur, the evil Morgana le Fay (played by Helen Mirren) meets her end at the hands of Mordred, her son in the film, instead of accompanying Arthur to Avalon as she did in the source material.

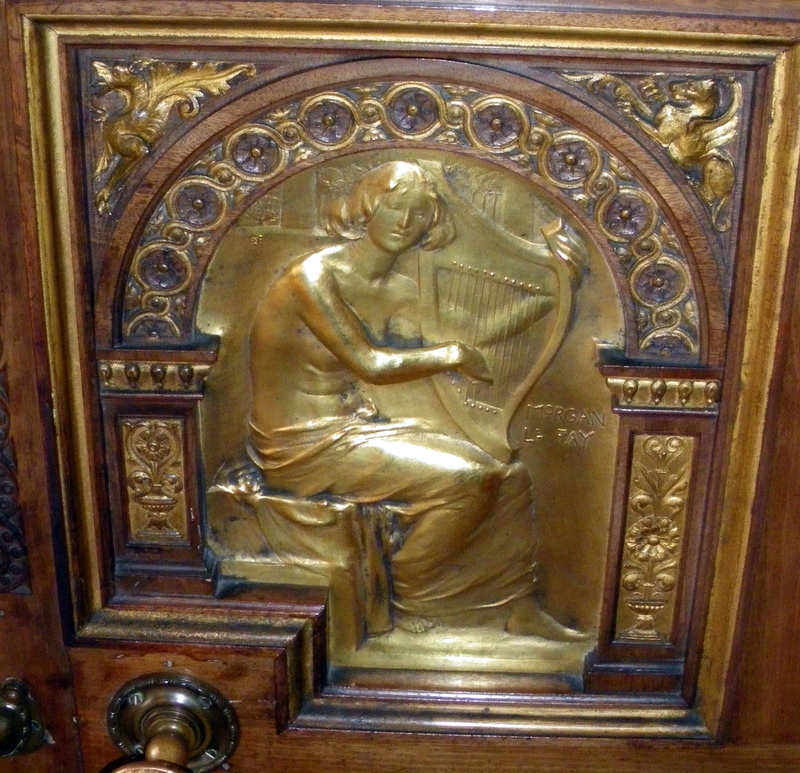
A Victorian era low relief of Morgan at Two Temple Place in London

Nevertheless, other modern versions of Morgan's character can be more sympathetic or ambiguous, or even present her as in an entirely positive light, and some also feature her as a protagonist of a story. Alan Lupack noted in 2007 that a modern Morgan has evolved to become "a woman whose own values and concerns [have] become central in some retellings of the Arthurian story;" Fiona Tolhurst pointed out how "some contemporary novelists sanitize or justify" Morgan's origins as "the oversexed counter-hero in most medieval Arthurian texts." One notable example of this trend is Marion Zimmer Bradley's The Mists of Avalon (1983), an influential novel that was later adapted into a television miniseries; other such positions in modern literature, sometimes told in first person from her point of view, include Mary Pope Osborne's series Magic Tree House, Welwyn Wilton Katz's The Third Magic (1988), Fay Sampson's Daughter of Tintagel (1992), Nancy Springer's I Am Morgan le Fay (2001), J. Robert King's Le Morte D'Avalon (2003), and Felicity Pulman's I, Morgana (2014). Cindy Mediavilla praised two still antagonistic but in her opinion non-stereotypical portrayals of Morgan in the 21st-century television series Merlin (2008, played by Katie McGrath) and Camelot (2011, played by Eva Green) "as being among the most fully realized versions of her character in any medium." Some modern authors, especially women, are also particularly interested in the theme of a love-hate relationship between Morgan and Arthur, as studied by Raymond H.Thompson.

Furthermore, since the late 20th century, some feminists have also adopted Morgan as a representation of female power or of a fading form of feminine spirituality supposedly practised by the Celts or earlier peoples. These interpretations draw upon the original portrayal of Morgan as a benevolent figure with extraordinary healing powers. According to Leila K. Norako, "in addition to her appearances in literature, television, and film, Morgan le Fay is also frequently mentioned in the context of neo-pagan religious groups. She is alternately worshipped as a goddess, hailed as a symbol of feminine power, and adopted as a spiritual name." This development was attributed to the influence of The Mists of Avalon, a revisionist retelling of the legend from a feminist and pro-pagan perspective. People who have been named or named themselves specifically after Arthurian figure of Morgan include Morgana Le Fay O'Reilly and Elizabeth Le Fey. Norako wrote:

Like many characters in the Arthurian legends, Morgan le Fay has been consistently transformed and interpreted by authors and artists for nearly a millennium. [S]he is alternately cast as a healer, villain, enchantress, seductress, or some combination thereof, depending on the needs of the work in question. This versatility has no doubt played a part in the continued cultural relevance that this character has enjoyed across the centuries and continues to hold in contemporary culture as well.

Morgan was one of eight British magical figures who were commemorated on a series of UK postage stamps issued by the Royal Mail in 2011, and one of the three Arthurian figures (along with Arthur and Merlin) commemorated on the gold and silver British pound coins issued by the Royal Mint in 2023.

== In literature ==
The bolded titles mark the character's an appearance as the work's main character and/or narrator.

=== Series ===
==== 21st century ====
Title	Year	Nature	Character	Notes
The Love Saga of the Sweet Villains or My Sweet Villains	2026	Good	Morgana le Fay	A series of erotic fantasy novels by Jirawut Namsynth, she married with Woody Walker and become his first wife.
The Legendborn Cycle	2020	Good/Other	Morgaine	A series of fantasy novels by Tracy Deonn, comprising Legendborn (2020), Bloodmarked (2022), Oathbound (2025), and an as yet untitled fourth volume. The series takes as its premise the idea that descendants of Merlin, King Arthur, and twelve of his knights survive in the present, using supernatural powers inherited from their ancestors to fight demons. In the past, Morgaine was Arthur's younger half-sister and Merlin's apprentice. In the present, she gives her name to a sect of rogue magic users who are morally ambiguous -- while they are ruthless and hostile to the heroes (including Arthur's descendant), they are also committed to fighting demons.
Camelot 2050	2018	Evil	Morgana le Fay	A series of science fantasy novels by David J.R. Cartwright.
Daughters of Avalon	2018	Good	Morgan Pendragon	A series of historical romance novels by Tanya Anne Crosby, in which Morgan's descendants Elspeth and Morwen's are respectively the protagonist and antagonist characters.
**Fata Morgana**	2017	Good	Morgan the Fae	A series of historical fantasy novels by Jo-Anne Blanco, planned as six trilogies telling about the childhood and early youth of Morgan.
The Legends of King Arthur	2017		Morgana le Fay	A series of historical fantasy novels by Ben Gillman.
Lost Camelot	2017		Morgan LeFay, Morgan of the Fairies	A series of novels by M.L. Bullock.
The Mice of the Round Table	2017	Evil	Morgan le Fay	A series of children's fantasy novels by Julie Leung. The evil Morgan is introduced in Voyage to Avalon and is the antagonist of Merlin's Last Quest.
Prophecies of Fate	2017	Evil	Morgan le Fay	A series of historical fantasy novels by T. J. Mayhew.
The Wizard's Dog	2017	Good	Morgana	A series of novels by Eric Kahn Gale.
The Wizards of Once	2017	Good	Wish, Morgana	A series of children's fantasy novels by Cressida Cowell, comprising The Wizards of Once (2017), Twice Magic (2018), Knock Three Times (2019), and Never and Forever (2020). The series provides a shared backstory for Morgana (originally known as Wish), King Arthur (Xar), and Sir Lancelot (Bodkin) in which thirteen-year-old Wish, an untrained but unprecedentedly powerful Wizard, works with Xar and Bodkin to end the war between their tribes and defeat the Witches, the series's villains. Wish changes her name to Morgana at the end of the series to mark her coming-of-age.
Woven	2017	Other	Morgan le Fay	A series of fantasy novels by Bree Moore, including Morgan-centered **Bound**.
The Archimage Wars	2016	Evil	Morgain, Morgana	A series of fantasy novels by Philip Blood.
Avalon Chronicles	2016		Morgana	A series of historical fantasy novels by Alexa Whitewolf.
Camelot Reborn	2016	Evil	Morgan LaFaye	A series of romance novels by Sharon Ashwood, including Enchanted Warrior, Enchanted Guardian, Royal Enchantment, and Enchanter Redeemed.
The Chronicles of Mordred	2016	Good	Morgan Le Fay	A series of fantasy novels by Douglas Clegg.
The Dragon's Dove Chronicles	2016	Other	Morghe ferch Uther	A series of historical fantasy novels by Kim Iverson Headlee, including Dawnflight, Morning's Journey, and Raging Sea. Lady Morghe is introduced in Dawnflight as the youngest child of Uther and Igraine, and she bears little love for her older brother Arthur for wielding control over her life. In Morning's Journey, she assists her betrothed, Arthur's nemesis Chieftain Urien, in a plot against the firstborn son of Arthur and his wife Gyanhumara (Guinevere). Morghe, now the Chieftainess of Clan Muray, and Urien marry in Raging Sea, and they continue their anti-Arthur agenda.
Guinevere's Tale	2016		Morgan	A trilogy of novels by Nicole Evelina in which Morgan is the villain. She a mysterious orphan and gifted priestess of Avalon who becomes Guinevere's rival in the first book, Daughter of Destiny. In 2016's Camelot's Queen, Morgan converts to Christianity. Evelina also plans to write a Morgan's story book.
The Invisible Entente	2016		Morgan le Fay	A series of novels by Krista Walsh.
Sons of Camelot	2016	Good	Morgana le Fae	A series of fantasy novels by Kim Dragoner.
Tales of Camelot	2016		Morgan Le Fay	A series of novels by Kieran Higgins, including The Forgotten Sister and The Forbidden Sister.
The Igraine Trilogy	2016		Morgan	A series by Lavinia Collins.
Knights of the Tarot	2016	Evil	Morgan le Fay	A series of romance novels by Nina Mason, starting with Knight of Wands.
Merlin's Secrets	2016	Evil	Morgana	A series of novels by Carmel Niland, beginning with A Darker Magic This Way Comes.
Morgana's Handmaid	2016		Morgana	
**Nine Morgans**	2016	Good	Morgan le Fay	A series of novels by A.L. Tyler, including Morgan in the Mirror and Morgan on the Run.
**Space Lore**	2016	Good	Morgan Le Fay	A series of science fiction novels by Chris Dietzel.
The Queen of the North	2016	Other	Morgan	A series of fantasy novels by Lavinia Collins.
The Return of Sir Percival	2016	Evil	Morgana, Megaera Igaris	A series of romance novels by Alexander O'Keefe, beginning with Guinevere's Prayer.
The Traveller	2016	Evil	Morgana le Fay	A series of novels by S.E. Wright, including Children of Avalon, City of the Gods, and Atlantis Bound.
Arthur's Legacy	2015		Morag	A series of novels by J. Hannigan, beginning with The Maid of Camelot, a story of Morag's daughter.
**Fay Morgan Chronicles**	2015	Other	Morgan le Fay, Fay Morgan	A series of urban fantasy novels by Katherine Sparrow, including The Magician's Mistake, The Dragon's Secret, The Witch's Hunger, The Demon's Revenge, The Hunter's Prey, and The King's Leash. It features an immortal Morgan as a Wiccan supply store in modern-day Chicago.
A Merlin Mystery	2015	Good	Morgan Pendragon	A series of fantasy novels by Jay Rudd.
Lakewood	2015	Evil	Morgana	A series by Sarah Kleck.
The Last White Faerie	2015	Evil	Morgana, Morgan le Fay	A series by Roger Ewing Taylor.
**The Morgan Trilogy**	2015	Other	Morgan	A series of fantasy novels by Lavinia Collins: The Witches of Avalon, The Curse of Excalibur, and The Fall of Camelot. Collected as Morgan: An Arthurian Fantasy.
New Camelot	2015	Evil	Morgan	A series of fantasy romance novels by Torie James.
New Knights of the Round Table	2015		Morgan LaFever	A series by John G. Hartness.
Secret Knight	2015	Evil	Morgana le Faye	A series by Joshua Elliot James.
Sons of Camelot	2015	Good	Morgana la Fae	A series of fantasy novels by K.T. Tomb.
Tales of Lady Guinevere	2015	Other	Morgaine	A series of novellas by Mande Matthews.
Validur	2015	Evil	Morgan Le Fay	A series of novels by Chance Glenn, beginning with Flames of Camelot.
Albion's Circle	2014	Other	Morgana	A series of novels by Jessica Jarman.
Arthur Dies at the End	2014		Morgan le Fay	Jeffrey Wikstrom's series of comedic retellings of Le Morte d'Arthur, including **Morgan le Fay, Queen of Gore**.
Avalon Relics	2014	Good	Morgana	A series of novels by J.L. Clark (Jennifer Yen) featuring the young protagonist Sophia Bennett as a modern descendant of Morgana.
The Camelot Wars	2014	Evil	Morgana, Morgan Le Fay, Morgause	A novel series by Michael Clary. In it, the evil sorceress Morgana invades the modern world, casting a spell that makes all modern technology useless and makes her forces travel the world searching for Arthur to end his life before he can claim the Excalibur and unite the people against her.
The Children of Arthur	2014	Good	Morgan le Fay, Morgana	A series of novels by Tyler R. Tichelaar, including Arthur's Legacy (2014) and Melusine's Gift (2015). Lady Morgana is a druid priestess Lady of Avalon, an ally and former disciple of the wizard Merlin, and mother to Mordred, here a good prince son of Morgana and her half-brother King Arthur from before his marriage at the urging of Merlin. The villains are Constantine and Guinevere's half-sister, the Witch Queen Gwenhwyvach. Later, in the third book in the series, Ogier's Prayer, Morgan is the lover of Ogier the Dane and mother of his son.
Children of Avalon	2014	Good	Morgan le Fey	A series of novels by Meredith Bond, in which the Lady Morgan le Fay is the ruler of Avalon and a sister to the power-hungry Nimue, the villain of the story: Air: Merlin's Chalice, Water: Excalibur's Return, Fire: Nimuë’s Destiny.
The Children of Camelot	2014	Good	Morgana	A young adult novel series by Donna Hosie, starting with The Ring of Morgana and continued in The Fire of Merlin and The Spirit of Nimue, wherein the teenage protagonist Mila Roth's parents are "the awakened King Arthur and Gorian druid queen, Morgana," and the Lady of the Lake is the antagonist.
The Devices	2014	Evil	Morgan le Fay	A novel series by Philip Purser-Hallard, beginning with The Pendragon Protocol and continued in The Locksley Exploit.
Forever Camelot	2014	Evil	Morgana	A novel series by J. Lynn McCoy, in particular Prophecy.
Forever Avalon	2014	Evil	Morgana le Fay	A series of novels by Mark Piggott, in particular The Dark Tides.
Guinevere	2014		Morgan	A trilogy by Lavinia Collins.
**I, Morgana**	2014	Other	Morgana	A novel by Felicity Pulman, in which an elderly Morgana tells the story of her life. It was followed by The Once and Future Camelot (2016), the story of Morgana's descendants: the medieval troubadour Marie and a 21st-century botanist Morgan.
The Knight Trilogy	2014	Evil	Morgan Le Fay	A series of novels by Katie M. John.
**The Lion of Wales**	2014	Good	Nell ferch Morgan	A series of historical novels by Sarah Woodbury.
**Le Fay**	2014	Good	Morgan le Fay	A series of illustrated novels by Realm Lovejoy, beginning with Henge and continued with Sword.
Legendary Saga	2014	Evil	Morgana LeFay	A novel series by L.H. Nicole, starting in Legendary and continued in Claiming Excalibur and Relics of Camelot.
The Pendragon Legacy	2014	Good	Morgana	A series of novels by Sarah Luddington.
The Book of Cross	2013	Other	Morgana le Fay, Titania, Gloriana	The novels by Peter Roman: The Mona Lisa Sacrifice, The Dead Hamlets, and The Apocalypse Ark.
Daughters of Avalon	2013	Evil	Morgan le Fay	A series of novels by Darryl Jouett, including The Wizard's Book.
Heirs of the Magykal Realm	2013	Evil	Morgan le Fey	Two novels by Dawna Ravers: Colour Wielders and Severed Colours.
King Arthur and Her Knights	2013	Good	Morgan le Fey	A series of novels by K.M Shea.
Merlin Chronicles	2013	Evil	Morgana le Fay	A series of novels by Daniel Diehl in which Morgana has been denied the throne because of her gender and became a powerful evil sorceress. She has stayed alive for 1,600 years by using sex to drain vitality from men. Now she owns a giant global corporation and works to find a way to bring back dragons. Merlin, who has escaped her survived by hiding inside a magic sphere, and a young archaeologist Jason Carpenter join forces to find and defeat Morgana before it is too late.
The Merlin Spiral	2013	Evil	Ganieda, Morgana	A trilogy of novels by Robert Treskillard.
**Morgana Trilogy**	2013	Good	Morgana Pendragon	A young adult novel series by Alessa Ellefson: Blood of the Fey, Fire of the Fey, and Rise of the Fey.
Pendragon	2013	Evil	Morgana Le Fay	A trilogy of fantasy novels by Nicola S. Dorrington.
The Prophecy of Three	2013	Evil	Morgana	A young adult novel series by Sam Whitehouse, including The Keys of Time and The Demons Hunt.
Seven Sisters of Avalon	2013	Good	Morgan, Morgaine, Morgana	A series of fantasy novels by Katrina Rasbold.
Tales of New Camelot	2013	Good	Morgan Le Fey	A series of fantasy novels by Brenda Gable.
Young Knights	2013	Evil	Morgan La Faye	A series of science fantasy novels by Julia Golding.
AD 491 to AD 517	2012	Good	Morgan Le Fay	A series of novels by Aenghus Chisholme, including AD 491: Merlin the Sorcerer, AD 494: Gwenhwyvar the Queen, and AD 499: Sir Guaen and the Green Knight.
The Amethyst Dragon	2012	Other	Morgan le Fay	A series of novels by D.C. Grace, including Dragon Wings and Pixie Dust.
Avalon	2012	Evil	Morgana le Fey	A series of novels by Robert Larrison, including Ghosts of Avalon (2012), Queen of Avalon (2012), and the prequel The Last Battle for Camelot (2013).
The Avalon Legacies	2012	Good	Morgaine Le Fay	A series of novels by Nicole Hill, including Legacy Forgotten and Legacy Foretold.
Children of Merlin	2012	Evil	Morgan Le Fay	A series of modern fantasy romance novels by Susan Squires. Also known as the Magic series.
The Knights of Camelot	2012	Good	Morgana Avallach	Morgana is a featured character in this novel series by Sarah Luddington, including in Lancelot's Burden (2012), Lancelot's Challenge (2012), Betrayal of Lancelot (2013), Passion of Lancelot (2013), and Revenge of Lancelot (2014).
Otherworld Chronicles	2012	Evil	Morgaine	A juvenile novel series by Nils Johnson-Shelton, including The Invisible Tower (2012), The Seven Swords (2013), and The Dragon King (2013).
Pendragon Legacy	2012	Evil	Morgan Le Fay	A series by Katherine Roberts, beginning with Sword of Light and continued in Lance Of Truth (2012), Crown of Dreams (2013), and Grail Of Stars (2014). In it the witch Lady Morgan is now dead, having first drowned her druid mentor Merlin, but her spirit advises her evil son Mordred from the underworld of Annwn.
Spell Sisters	2012	Evil	Morgana Le Fay	A series of children's novels by Amber Castle, including Sophia the Flame Sister (2012), Lily the Forest Sister (2012), Isabella the Butterfly Sister (2012), Amelia the Silver Sister (2012), Grace the Sea Sister (2012), Evie the Swan Sister (2012), Olivia the Otter Sister (2013), and Chloe the Storm Sister (2013). In it, "Morgana is the elder sister of the other eight Spell Sisters who live on Avalon. She grew jealous of her sisters, and decided she wanted to take all of their powers and have Avalon all to herself."
Tales from Camelot	2012	Good	Morgan la Fay	A series by Paul Green, where Morgan is "an innocent victim of abuse who was rescued and brought in under her big brother's protective wing."
Wicked Little Things	2012	Other	Morgan le Fay	A series of romance novels by Kendra Leigh Castle, including Reflected Desire and Taming the Dragon.
Excather	2011	Evil	Morgan	A series of novels by Gregory J. Downs, beginning with Mordred.
Men of the Isles	2011	Other	Morgana	A series of novels by Debbie Mazzuca.
**Morgen of Avalon**	2011	Good	Morgen	Carol Weakland's trilogy consisting of Dreamspell, Child of Destiny and Epiphany. Morgen is a faerie goddess and Queen of Avalon dedicated to teaching people about peace, healing and their connection to the divine. She assumed mortal form as a changeling child to become King Arthur's healer and his true love, and helps him create a peaceful Britannia through her powers of healing and prophecy. Later books also feature a daughter of Morgen and Merlin, Eliana.
The Perilous Order of Camelot	2011	Other	Morgeu the Fey	A series of novels by A. A. Attanasio, including The Dragon and the Unicorn, The Wolf and the Crown, and The Eagle and the Sword.
Spell	2011	Evil	Morgana le Fay	Lady Morgana le Fay is the villain of this children's novel series by C.J. Busby, including in Frogspell, Cauldron Spells (2012), Swordspell (2013), and Icespell (2014). Morgana is the most powerful sorceress in the kingdom who is secretly plotting to kill her brother Arthur so that she could be queen.
The Megaverse Series	2010	Good	Morgana Le Fay	A series of novels by Angela Knight, including Morgana's book **The Oath of Service**.
Merlin Prophecy	2010	Other	Morgan	A prequel series to M K Hume's King Arthur Trilogy, wherein Morgan is especially featured in Hunting with Gods (2013).
Dark Britannia	2009	Evil	Morgana le Fey	A series of novels by Bill Coffin, including Pax Morgana (2009), Pax Arcadia (2011), and Pax Britannia (2013).
King Arthur Trilogy	2009	Other	Morgan the Fay	A series of three novels by M K Hume: Dragon's Child (2009), Warrior of the West (2009), and The Bloody Cup (2010).
Pendragon's Banner Trilogy	2009	Good	Morgaine	A series of novels by Helen Hollick in which Morgaine is a pagan priestess known as the Lady of the Lake and the mother of Arthur's son Medraut (Mordred).
The Red Monocle	2009	Evil	Morgan le Fay	A series of children's novels by Wim Coleman and Pat Perrin, including The Taker and the Keeper (2009) and The Death of the Good Wizard (2011). Its Morgan is a contemporary world-threatening sorceress and an enemy of Merlin and his modern students, able to take the form of a snake (small or large) and work great magic.
Twilight of Avalon	2009		Morgan of Avalon	A series by Anna Elliott in which Morgan is dead before the story begins. **Dawn of Avalon** is a stand-alone novella set in the world of Twilight of Avalon, telling the story of Morgan's and Melin's youth as lovers.
Doomsday Brethren	2008	Evil	Morganna le Fay	A series of novels by Shayla Black, including Tempt Me with Darkness (2008), Possess Me at Midnight (2009), Seduce Me In Shadow (2009), and Entice Me at Twilight (2010).
The Matter of Britain	2008	Evil	Morgana	A series of novels by Mark Adderley, including and The Hawk and the Wolf (2008) and The Heroes of Annwn (2013).
Merlin Investigation	2008	Evil	Morgan Le Fay	A series of novels by J.M.C. Blair: The Excalibur Murders (2008), The Lancelot Murders (2009), and The Pendragon Murders (2010).
Otherworld	2008		Morgaine	A series of novels by Yasmine Galenorn, wherein Morgaine, the half-fae Queen of Shadow and Dusk is introduced in Darkling (2008) and returning in several of later books including Dragon Wytch (2008), Demon Mistress (2009), Night Huntress (2009), Bone Magic (2010), Harvest Hunting (2010), Courting Darkness (2011), Haunted Moon (2013), Priestess Dreaming (2014), and Panther Prowling (2015).
Realm of the Bear	2008	Evil	Morgan le Fay, Morgana	A series of novels by S. R. Sorel.
Guardians of Eternity	2007	Evil	Morgana le Fay	A series of novels by Alexandra Ivy, including Embrace the Darkness (2007), Darkness Revealed (2009) and Bound By Darkness (2011).
PenDragon's Requite	2007	Other	Morgana Cornwall, Morgana Le Fey	The "fallen princess of Cornwall, Morgana the renegade Fey" is introduced in Victor C. Brice's King Arthur Triumphant (2007) and featured in The Queens of Nightmares and Dreams (2011). The third book, The Sovereign Prince (2014), features two children of Arthur's son Michael and Morgana.
The Three Damosels	2007	Evil	Morgan le Fay, The Morrigan	A trilogy of novellas by Vera Chapman, starting with The Green Knight and continued in King Arthur's Daughter.
Camelot	2006	Good	Morgan le Fey	A series by Cynthia Breeding, including Fate of Camelot (2008) and Camelot's Enchantment (2011). In it, Morgan is Faerie queen engaged to her demigod consort Cernunnos.
The Chronicles of Mordred	2006	Good	Morgan	A fantasy series by Douglas Clegg, beginning with Mordred, Bastard Son.
The Chronicles of the Imaginarium Geographica	2006	Good	The Morgaine, the Three Who Are One	A series of novels by James A. Owen, including Here, There Be Dragons (2006) and The Search for the Red Dragon (2008) and The Shadow Dragons (2009). The Morgaine are three witches: Gweynhfar (Guinevere), Circe, and Calypso.
Grail Quest	2006	Evil	Morgain le Fay	A series of novels by Laura Anne Gilman, including The Camelot Spell, Morgain's Revenge, and The Shadow Companion.
Grey Griffins	2006	Evil	Morgan LaFey, Morgan the Black Witch	A series of juvenile fiction novels by Derek Benz and J. S. Lewis, featuring an immortal Morgan as an antagonist in The Revenge of the Shadow King and The Rise of the Black Wolf. The story, while set in present day, is loosely tied to Arthurian mythology, via a blood line connecting the hero directly back to Arthur.
Knights of the Round Table	2006	Good	Morgana	A series of novels by Gwen Rowley, including Knights of the Round Table: Lancelot (2006) and Knights of the Round Table: Gawain (2007).
Lords of Avalon	2006	Evil	Morgan Le Fey	A series of novels by Sherrilyn Kenyon (Kinley MacGregor) in which Morgen Le Fey is a beautiful but heartlessly evil Queen of the Fey who will not stop until she restores her son Mordred to life and takes the throne of Camelot.
The Promethean Age	2006	Good	Morgan le Fey, Morgan of Cornwall	A series of novels by Elizabeth Bear, including Ink and Steel and Blood and Iron. It combines elements of secret history of Elizabethan Age and fantasy, the immortal Morgan le Fay is one of the rulers of an actually existing Kingdom of Faerie, secretly allied with the England of Elizabeth I. In this depiction, Morgan le Fay took the playwright Christopher Marlowe into Faerie in 1593, when history records his death, and made him her lover. The reluctant Marlowe is seen as compelled by magic to have sex with her.
Luke Lancelot	2005	Evil	Morganna	A series of children's books by Giles Andreae, including Luke Lancelot and the Treasure of the Kings and Luke Lancelot and the Golden Shield.
Nightside	2005	Evil	Morgan La Fae	A series of novels by Simon R. Green, in which she is mentioned in Hex and the City and Paths Not Taken, before appearing as a modern-era antagonist in A Hard Day's Knight.
The Sisters Grimm	2005	Good	Morgan le Fay	In this series by Michael Buckley, the beautiful Morgan le Fay, who used to be King Arthur's trusted advisor in Camelot, is an Everafter who was part of a coven of witches called The Three to keep the humans of Ferryport Landing none the wiser of the existence of Everafters. She has a son named Mordred and is married to Mr. Seven in the Council of Mirrors.
The Paths to Camelot	2004	Evil	Morgaine, Morgaine the Goddess, Morgaine the Sleepless, Morgan the Fey	In this series by Sarah Zettel, Morgaine is an evil sorceress who wants to destroy Merlin and take Camelot. She has the son her son Mordred and a good twin sister of Queen Morgause, who along with Merlin has once captured and imprisoned her. In the first book, In Camelot's Shadow, Morgaine acts through her apprentice and adoptive daughter Kerra and sorceress Euberacon. In For Camelot's Honor, Morgaine orks with Gwiffert, using magic to make the Welsh chieftain Elen, whose brother was Urien kills, betray Arthur. Elen escapes her power with Merlin's help and uses a magic spear of the Green Man to kill Morgaine's beloved husband Urien the Bull. In Under Camelot's Banner, Morgaine manipulates various people to break minor lands away from Camelot. She plots with the traitorous prince Colan against Lynet and Gareth and to overthrow the rule of Cambryn, where she, Morgaine and Guinevere grew up together, and also disguises as Guinevere to seduce Lancelot. In Camelot's Blood, Morgause's son Agravain and the half-water spirit Laurel Carnbrea, the Queen of Cambryn, help to defend the land of Gododdin from the Pictish invasion led by Morgaine and Mordred who have caused the disappearance of Morgause and drove King Lot to madness. In the end, Agravain defeats them and Laurel tricks and destroys Morgaine after a shapeshifting duel.
Die Legende von Camelot	2001	Evil	Morgaine	A series of three novels by Wolfgang Hohlbein and Heike Hohlbein.
Tales of Guinevere	2001	Good	Morgana	A series of novels by Alice Borchardt, beginning with The Dragon Queen.
Rexcalibur	2001	Evil	Morgan	The Magic Returns and Eternity's Hope by Mitzi Kleidon.
Shalott	2001	Other	Morgan le Fay	A series of young adult novels by Felicity Pulman, including Shalott (2001), Return to Shalott (2002) and Shalott: The Final Journey (2003).

==== 20th century ====
Title	Year	Nature	Character	Notes
Guenevere	1999	Other	Morgan Le Fay	A trilogy of novels by Rosalind Miles: Guenevere, Queen of the Summer Country (1999), The Knight of the Sacred Lake (2001), and The Child of the Holy Grail (2002).
Arthur's Quest	1999	Evil	Morgana	Morgana kills Pendragon and travels to the 20th century in search of Excalibur
The Tales of Annwn	1999	Other	Morgan le Fay	Morgan is an ancestress of the sorceress Morgana in this series by Alison Baird, including The Hidden World and its prequel The Wolves of Woden.
Knights Quest	1998	Evil	Morgan le Fay	A trilogy by Peter McElhinney: Knights Errant, Search for the Swords and Larthingal.
Merlin's Legacy	1998	Evil	Morgana	Dawn of Camelot and Daughter of Camelot by Carla Simpson.
The Squire's Tales	1998	Good	Morgan Le Fay	A series by Gerald Morris. In The Squire's Tale, Lady Morgan first appears as a shapeshifting (introducing herself in form of a dragon) Arthur's half-sister and Gawain's aunt and a chaotic enchantress. Morgan has an elder sister Morgause who appears to be reincarnation of the evil goddess known as The Enchantress and is plotting to kill Arthur. In The Squire, His Knight, and His Lady, the readers learn about Morgan's failed attempt to heal Gawain's young sister Elaine and of her forbidden love of Arthur. In The Savage Damsel and the Dwarf, Morgan tutors the protagonist Lady Lynet in magic. In The Princess, the Crone, and the Dung-Cart Knight, Morgan disguises herself as a crone to protect her young niece Sarah from Morgause's minion Meliagant. In The Lioness and Her Knight, a young Luneta of Orkney, a daughter of Lynet, goes to the fairy realm Other World and is thought by her great-aunt Lady Morgan to become an enchantress just like Morgan has also trained her mother and dozens of other sorceresses. In The Legend of the King, Morgan goes to a forever sleep together with Arthur.
Harry Potter	1997	Evil	Morgan le Fay, Morgana	In the franchise's lore, Morgan was a very powerful Dark witch, especially very adapt with transformation (into a bird) and healing spells, who lived during the Middle Ages. She was the half-sister of King Arthur and an enemy of Merlin and she played a role in many events during her lifetime. Like her half-brother, she was a monarch, ruling as queen of the island of Avalon. She is mentioned in Harry Potter and the Philosopher's Stone and appears on famous wizard cards in some Harry Potter games. In 2011, Royal Mail issued a series of stamps featuring magical figures, including Morgan le Fay based on the Harry Potter author J. K. Rowling.
The Mordred Cycle	1995			A trilogy of novels by Haydn Middleton, including Morgan-centered **The Queen's Captive**.
The Warlord Chronicles	1995	Other	Morgan	A series of historical-fantasy novels by Bernard Cornwell beginning with The Winter King and continued in Enemy of God (1998) and Excalibur: A Novel of Arthur (1999). Horribly disfigured in a fire that claimed her husband, she is the bastard daughter of Uther Pendragon, High King of Britain, and beloved half-sister of Arthur. She is a relatively minor character who begins the series as the chief lieutenant of the druid Merlin, but is eventually supplanted by the younger Nimue. Through a friendship and eventual marriage to Sansum, a bishop, Morgan ultimately converts to Christianity. She is portrayed as wise and waspish, and once referred to by the narrator Derfel as the most poorly tempered woman in Britain and called a saint in heaven. Also known as The King Arthur Trilogy.
The Crossroads	1994	Evil		In Nick O'Donohoe's The Magic and the Healing and Under the Healing Sign (1995), Morgan the evil queen of Anavalon, Arthur's former kingdom and now a wasteland, who invades Crossroads, a magical realm where the paths to many worlds intersect.
**Daughter of Tintagel**	1992	Other	Morgan le Fay	A series of novels by Fay Sampson, telling the story of Morgan from five various perspectives (including her own): Wise Woman's Telling, White Nun's Telling, Blacksmith's Telling, Taliesin's Telling, Herself. Reprinted in 2005 as **Morgan le Fay**.
Le Cycle du Graal	1992		Morgane	A series of books by Jean Markale, including **La fée Morgane**.
Magic Tree House	1992	Good	Morgan le Fay	The lead characters of Mary Pope Osborne's long series of this children's books, Jack and Annie, are taken on secret missions throughout history by Morgan in the majority of the books, travelling through time in her magical treehouse.
Dark Ages of Britain	1988	Good	Morgan of Avalon	In Joan Wolf's The Road to Avalon, Born of the Sun (1989) and The Edge of Light (1990), Morgan is at once Merlin's daughter, Mordred's mother, and Arthur's lover. In The Road to Avalon, Morgan is the youngest daughter of Merlin and loves Arthur, who refuses to marry him and conceals her pregnancy with their child Mordred for the good of Britain. Also known as Warrior Kings trilogy.
Guinevere	1987	Evil	Morgan le Fay	A series of novels by Persia Woolley, including Child of the Northern Spring (1987), Queen of the Summer Stars (1991) and Guinevere: The Legend in Autumn (1993), in which Morgan is a power-hungry pagan high priestess and Lady of the Lake, who turns into an enemy of Guinevere and Arthur.
The Pendragon Cycle	1987	Evil	Morgian	A series of novels by Stephen R. Lawhead.
Wildworld	1987	Good	Morgana	In L. J. Smith's Night of the Solstice, Morgana is a half-fairy and largely sympathetic character and an ally of the children protagonists. In the sequel Heart of Valor (1990), one of her enemies is the evil Merlin.
The Wizard of 4th Street	1987	Good	Morgan LeFay	In Simon Hawke's original The Wizard of 4th Street and the sequels The Wizard of Whitechapel (1988), The Wizard of Sunset Strip (1989), The Wizard of Rue Morgue (1990), The Samurai Wizard (1991), The Wizard of Santa Fe (1991), The Wizard of Camelot (1993), and The Wizard of Lovecraft's Cafe (1993), the half-breed magical alien/human Morgan, her son Modred, two descendants of her sisters Elaine and Morgause, Merlin, Gorlois's spirit and the descendants of his daughters all join forces with modern characters to fight evil through time and space.
The New Magic	1985	Evil	Morgan Le Fay	A series of novels by Pamela F. Service, set in Britain after five centuries of nuclear winter that cast it into "a new Dark Age that is, once again the setting for a conflict between Arthur and Merlin and their old enemy Morgan La Fay." It includes Winter of Magic's Return, was followed by Tomorrow's Magic (1987), Yesterday's Magic (2008), and Earth's Magic (2009).
The Keltiad	1984	Good	Morgan Magistra	A series of science-fantasy novels by Patricia Kennealy-Morrison wherein Morgan is one of the ancestors of the titular protagonist of the first cycle, Tales of Aeron. In the second cycle, Morgan appears as an important character in The Hawk's Gray Feather (1990) and The Hedge of Mist. She is a great sorceress and a sister of Arthur, opposing her evil twin Marguessan (Morgause), and married to Taliesin who narrates the story.
Guinevere	1981	Other	Morgan Le Fay	A series of novels by Sharan Newman.
Tales of King Arthur	1977			A series of children's booklets by Desmond Dunkerley featuring Morgan as Merlin's stepsister.
Merlin	1973	Other	Morgan le Fay, Morgian	A novel series by Mary Stewart, including The Hollow Hills (1973), The Last Enchantment (1979), The Wicked Day (1983), and The Prince and the Pilgrim (1995).
Dragon	1961	Evil	Morgan le Fay	Children's fantasy books by Rosemary Manning, where Morgan is introduced in The Dragon's Quest and is Leodegrance's daughter in addition to Arthur's half-sister.
Stories of King Arthur	1905		Morgana le Fay	Howard Pyle both wrote and illustrated his series of reworking of Le Morte d' Arthur: The Story of King Arthur and His Knights (1903), The Story of the Champions of the Round Table (1905), The Story of the Champions of the Round Table (1905), The Story of Sir Launcelot and His Companions (1907), and The Story of the Grail and the Passing of King Arthur (1910).

=== Books ===
==== 21st century ====
Title	Year	Nature	Character	Notes
The Isle in the Silver Sea	2025		Simran Kaur Arora	A romance fantasy novel by Tasha Suri about a knight and a witch destined to kill one another, "the witch," Simran, is implied to be a reincarnation of Morgan le Fay.
The Bright Sword	2024	Other	Morgan le Fay	A novel by Lev Grossman describing the events that take place after King Arthur's death. Morgan is depicted as a fairy who wishes to conquer Britain and replace Christianity with the magical systems in which its inhabitants previously believed, which places her in opposition to Camelot and its Christian knights.
Lancelot: The Betrayal	2018	Good	Morgana	A novel by Giles Kristian.
Mr. Lake	2018	Evil	Morgan	A novel by Joe Eliseon.
Riven: When Storms Collide	2018	Good	Morgan	A novel by Cathy Hird.
White Knight	2018	Evil	Morgan Le Fay	A romance fantasy novel by Nicole Flockton and Abigail Owen.
Avalon Princes	2017		Morgana Pendleton	A novel by H. B. Loomis.
The Book Knights	2017	Evil	Morgan Fay	A young adult novel by J.G. McKenney.
Farewell To Camelot	2017		Morgana	A novel by J.M. Owens.
Heirs of Avalon	2017	Evil	Morgan le Fay	A novel by Béatrice Mary.
Into Otherness	2017		Morgan le Fay	The third book of the Dragon Lord Chronicles series by Miles O'Neal takes place in early 16th century Scotland. A long dead Morgan le Fay mysteriously allies with Argyll- an evil dragon- to wreak havoc on Gerald the youngest dragon lord and those he loves.
King Judy	2017			A novel by David Clow.
L.A. Knight	2017		Morgana	A novel by Amy Wolf.
Last Quest for Camelot	2017	Good	Morgan	A novel by Steve Manuel.
Lord Protector's War	2017	Evil	Morgan Le Fay	The second book in the Chronicles of the New Earth series of fantasy novels by Sean C. Helms.
**The Ring of Avalon**	2017	Good	Morgan le Fay	A novel by G.S. Forgey.
**Thorn Blood**	2017	Good	Morgan Le Fay	A novel by Elena Bryce.
Camelot Fallen	2016		Morgana	A novel by Joshua Darwin.
Enchanted Guardian	2016	Evil	Morgan LaFaye	A novel by Sharon Ashwood.
**Hearken to Avalon**	2016	Good	Morgaine	A novel by Arianna Alexsandra Collins.
Gawain and the Green Knight	2016			A novel by Stefan Emunds.
Kings	2016		Morghe ferch Uther	A novel by Kim Iverson Headlee and Patricia Duffy Novak.
The Once and Future Camelot	2016		Morgana le Fay	A novel by Felicity Pulman.
Otherworld Challenger	2016	Evil	Morgan le Fay, Lisbet	A romance novel by Jane Godman.
Sherlock Holmes and the Round Table Adventure	2016	Other	Morgan le Fey	A fantasy novel by Joseph W. Svec III.
Airships of Camelot	2015	Good	Morgan	A novel by Robison Wells.
Pendragon's Heir	2015	Other	Morgan le Fay	A novel by Suzannah Rowntree.
Merlin's Daughter	2015		Morgan la Fey	A novel by T. L. Ashcroft - Nowicki.
The Millennial Sword	2015	Other	Morgan le Fay	A novel by Shannon Phillips.
**Morgan: A Camelot Tale**	2015		Morgan le Fay	A novel by Deborah Foulkes.
Pendragon	2015	Evil	Morgan Le Fay	A novel by Christopher Bramble.
The Last Merlin	2015	Evil	Morgana	A novel by Matthew Jocks-Warren.
White Wolf of Avalon	2016	Good	Morgan le Fey	A fantasy romance novel by Eva Gordon.
Blood of Kings	2014	Good	Morgan le Fay	A series of novels by Billy Wong.
Camelot Burning	2014		Morgan le Fay	A novel by Kathryn Rose.
The Camelot Code	2014	Evil	Morgan Le Fay	A novel by Mari Mancusi.
Chapel of Carnal Love: A Novel	2014		Morgan	A "sexy fairy tale" by Susan Starr Richards.
Captain James Hook and the Siege of Neverland	2014		Morgan Le Fay	A novel by Jeremiah Kleckner and Jeremy Marshall.
King and Raven	2014	Good	Morgan le Fay	A novel by Cary James.
**King Arthur and the Quest for the Holy Grail**	2014	Good	Morgan Le Fay	A novel by Stephen Sim in which Lady Morgan is a protagonist against the Queen Guinevere.
**King Arthur's Sister in Washington's Court**	2014	Other	Morgan le Fay, Morgan the Wise	A science-fiction/fantasy crossover novel by Kim Iverson Headlee, sequel to Mark Twain's A Connecticut Yankee in King Arthur's Court and written as if by Mark Twain. Queen Morgan, upset that the Yankee has destroyed her world, casts a spell trying to get to Connecticut of 1879 to kill him before he can travel back to the sixth century. But her spell misses by 300 miles and 200 years, landing her in the Washington, DC of 2079, where she decides to rebuild her kingdom.
Merlin's Daughters	2014	Evil	Morgana	A novel by John Andrucci.
The Merrikan King	2014	Good	Fay Stone, Morgana Le Fay	A novel by Gerry Green.
**Lady Morgana**	2014	Good	Morgana Dawson	A novel by Desy Giuffrè.
Mordred and the King	2014	Evil	Morgan le Fay	A novel by John Michael Curlovichè.
The Prophecy	2014	Evil	Morgana	A novel by Lisa Jones.
Saving Artur	2014	Good	Morgana the Fey	A novel by Hayley Shaver.
Seeking the Eagle	2014	Evil	Morgana Le Fay, Madame Lafayette	A novel by Cameron Dickie.
Sword Across Time	2014	Evil	Morganna	A novel by Cathy Walker|When the realm of Avalon disappears into the mist, it leaves behind a powerful and dangerous legacy of curses invoked in the heat of anger and passion. The words of Merlin and the Lady of the Lake have faded to a mere whisper over the centuries, yet their power remains strong and deadly.In the present, Gavin and Tamara delve into the ancient diaries left by their forebears and strive to keep the power of the legendary Sword Excalibur out of the hands of a dark and twisted Morganna. To prevent Morganna from harnessing the sword's power, they must overcome the curse without becoming part of the blood ritual needed to ignite the power of the sword. But with Morganna growing stronger with each passing day, the stakes have never been higher. Will the descendants of Merlin and the Lady of the Lake be able to summon the strength and wisdom needed to triumph over evil and safeguard the sword's power for generations to come? Sword Across Time is a gripping tale of magic, bravery, and sacrifice that will keep you on the edge of your seat until the end.
Der Traum von Camelot	2014		Morgana	A novel by Viktor Goldmann.
Beyond the Myst: The Lost Years of King Arthur	2013	Evil	Morgana	A novel by Shari Prestwood, Ashley Kuppersmith, and N. K. Schlaudecker.
Eochaidh: The Legend of the Horsemen	2013	Evil	Morganna	A novel by Terri Reid.
Eternal	2013	Good	Morganna Alderley	A novel by Denise Dowdell-Stent.
Heartskin Stories	2013	Good	Morgana	A book by JM Levar.
Legend	2013	Good	Morgana, Donnchadh	A novel in the Area 51 series by Bob Mayer.
Magic & Mayhem	2013	Evil	Morgana le Fay	A novel in the Taurus Moon: Relic Hunter series by D.K. Gaston.
Merlin's Booke	2013		Morgan	A novel by Jane Yolen.
Mordred and the King	2013	Other	Morgan le Fay	A gay erotica fantasy novel by John Michael Curlovich.
The Unexpected Enlightenment of Rachel Griffin	2013	Evil	Morgana le Fey	A novel by L. Jagi Lamplighter.
The Archer's Madness	2012	Evil	Morgana La Fey, Eve Morgan	A modern fantasy novel by Daniel Burden.
The Galahad Factor	2012	Good	Morgana	A novel by Michael Bernard.
Incarnation	2012		Morgaine	A novel by Emma Cornwall.
Merlin's Candles	2012	Evil	Morgan Le Fay	A novel by L.B. MacDonald.
**Morgaine: Das Leben einer Priesterin von Avalon**	2012	Good	Morgaine	A novel by Christine Arana Fader.
Orion and King Arthur	2012	Evil	Morganna, Aphrodite	A novel by Ben Bova.
Poison	2012	Other	Morgan le Fay	A novel in the Legacy series by Molly Cochran.
**Queen Morgana and the Renfairies**	2012	Good	Morgana	A novel by Teel James Glenn.
Wicked Hungry	2012	Good	Morgan le Fey	A young adult urban fantasy novel by Teddy Jacobs.
Beloved Wizard	2011		Morgan Le Fey	A romance fantasy novel by Shannan Albright.
Broken: A Paranormal Romance	2011		Morgana	By David H. Burton.
**The Circle Cast: The Lost Years of Morgan Le Fay**	2011	Other	Anna, Morgan, Morgan Le Fay	A novel by Alex Epstein, speculating about what could have happened in the legend to Morgan, born as Anna, between her being sent into an exile to Ireland at the age of 11 after the murder of her father Gorlois by Uther Pendragon, and her return years later as a powerful witch seeking revenge.
The Death Catchers	2011	Good	Morgan le Faye	A young adult novel by Jennifer Anne Kogler in which the protagonist Lizzy Mortimer is the descendant of Morgan le Fay and Lancelot who opposes Morgan's evil sister, Vivienne le Mort.
Kingdom Jumper	2011	Evil	Morgana	The novel by Emily Lark in the Children of Avalon series.
**Marco**	2011		Celeste DeCumpania, Morgan	A novel in the Books of Insanity series by KT Pinto.
Mere Mortals' Magic	2011	Good	Morgenna la Fey	A fantasy novel by Ashleen O'Gaea.
Peltar and the Rainbow Knight	2011	Evil	Morgan LeFay	A novel by David McDonald.
La Signora del Graal	2011		Morgana la Fata	A novel by Federica Leva.
Arthur of Avalon	2010	Other	Morgan Le Fay	A novel by Gary L. Carlson.
The Dragons 2: Excalibur	2010	Good	Morgan le Fey	A juvenile fiction novel by Colin Thompson.
Heir to Avalon	2010	Evil	Morganna	A novel by C. A. Zraik.
**The Girl's King Arthur: Tales of the Women of Camelot**	2010	Good	Morgan le Fay	A collection of five stories by Barbara Tepa Lupack, including one about Morgan.
Kong Arthur og Ridderne af det Runde Bord	2010		Morgana	A juvenile fiction novel by Peter Gotthardt.
**Morgana**	2010		Morgana	A novel by A D Swift.
A Land Beyond Ravens	2009	Good	Morgaine	A novel by Kathleen Guler.
Guinevere's Gamble	2009	Other	Morgan	A novel by Nancy McKenzie.
**Morgaine**	2009		Morgaine	A novel by Jutta M. Baur.
Avalon's Eclipse	2008	Good	Morgan Le Fay	A novel by T. R. Myers.
Clara of Camelot and the Search for Excalibur	2008	Evil	Morgana le Fay	A novel by Ian Lauder.
The Curse	2008	Evil	Morgana	A novel by Marian Nichols.
Damosel	2008	Other	Morgan Le Fay	A novel by Stephanie Spinner.
**Elfindale**	2008	Good	Morgan le Fay	A book by Stuart Paul, where Morgan is a half-faerie sister to Arthur.
**Die Konigin Morgana**	2008		Morgana	A book by Margot Beier.
**Morgan Le Fay**	2008	Good	Morgan Le Fay, Ula, Carfus	A novel by Dozier Finley.
The Night Dance	2008	Evil	Morgan le Fey	A novel by Suzanne Weyn, mixing the Arthurian legend with the fairy tale of The Twelve Dancing Princesses.
Sons of Avalon: Merlin's Prophecy	2008	Good	Morgan	A novel by Dee Marie.
Sydney Wakefield: Into the Faraway	2008	Evil	Morgan Le Fay	A young adult novel by Kimberly J. Smith.
The Timeweavers	2008	Other	Morgan, Enchantress Queen, Raven Queen, Queen of Ravens	A novel by Morgan Fitzsimons and Kat Jones.
Beyond the Legend	2007	Evil	Morgan le Faye	A novel by Jo Ann Mason.
The Book of Mordred	2007		Morgan le Fay, Morgana	A novel by Vivian Vande Velde.
The Chronicles of Percyval	2007	Evil	Morgana, Black Queen	A novel by Michael Aguiar.
Song of the Sparrow	2007	Good	Morgan	A young adult novel by Lisa Ann Sandell.
King Arthur	2006	Evil	Morgana	A book by Gwyn Thomas.
King Arthur and his Ribald (K)nights	2006		Morgan	A book by Art Banta.
Merlin's Apprentice	2006	Evil	Morgan le Fay	A children's novel by Tanya Landman.
Merlin and the Mystic Childe	2006	Evil	Morgan le Faey	A novel by Susan Sawyer.
The Stones of Camelot	2006		Morgana Le Fay	A young adult novel by Brian Stableford.
**White Rose of Avalon**	2006	Good	Morgaine	A fantasy romance by Kelley Heckart in which Morgaine is the Fairy Queen of Avalon and one of the three female protagonists.
Witchery: A Ghosts of Albion Novel	2006	Evil	Morgana le Fey	A novel by Christopher Golden and Amber Benson.
The Heirs of Fate	2005	Other	Morgana	A book by Susan Wilson Younkins.
**Morgana the Spooky Sorceress**	2005	Evil	Morgana	An illustrated children's book by Tony Mitton and Arthur Robins.
In Days of Knights	2004	Other	Morganna le Fai	A book by Philip H. Young.
Time and Again	2004	Good	Morgan le Fay	A novel by R. Stachowiak.
Arthur the King	2003	Other	Morgan le Fay	A historical novel by Allan Massie.
**Le Morte D'Avalon**	2003	Other	Morgan, Morgan le Fey, Morrigan	A final part of the Arthurian series of novels by J. Robert King.
Sir Lancelot, Where Are You?	2003	Evil	Morgana le Fay	A children's novel in the Dragon Slayers' Academy series by Kate McMullan.
The Magic of Camelot	2003	Other	Morgan le Fey	A novel by Gabrielle Gilkison.
**I am Morgan le Fay: A Tale of Camelot**	2002	Other	Morgan le Fay	A novel by Nancy Springer.
Isle of Skye	2002	Good	Morgan	A novel by Constance Hall.
King Arthur's Courage	2002	Evil	Morgan le Fay	A children's novel by Stephanie Spinner.
A Memória da Espada	2002		Fada Morgana	A novel by Roberto de Sousa Causo.
Queen of Camelot	2002		Morgan, Witch of Rheged	A novel by Nancy McKenzie, originally published as The Child Queen (1994) and The High Queen (1995).
The Dragon's Son	2001	Other	Morgan	A novel by Sarah L. Thomson in which Morgan is Arthur's half-sister and embittered former wife, and a mother of his two twin sons, including Medraud. It is written partially from Morgan's point of view.
The Song of Arthur	2001	Good	Morgue	A novel by James Douglas Cramer.
Camelot Remembered	2000	Evil	Morgaine	A book by Janet Zibell.
**Temptresses: The Virago Book of Evil Women**	2000	Good	Morgan le Fay	A novel by Shahrukh Husain in which the fairy Morgan, "long painted as her half-brother King Arthur's foe, is shown to have been testing his worthiness, selflessly allowing herself to be thought of as a villain in order to train him to be a better, more careful ruler."
**Women of Camelot: Queens and Enchantresses at the Court of King Arthur**	2000		Morgan le Fay	A book by Mary Hoffman and Christina Balit.

==== 20th century ====
Title	Year	Nature	Character	Notes
Avalon: The Return of King Arthur	1999	Evil	Morgian, Moira	A novel by Stephen R. Lawhead.
The Road to Avalon	1988	Good	Morgan	A novel by Joan Wolf.
Guardian of the Balance	1999	Evil	Morgaine	A historical fantasy novel by Irene Radford.
**The Enchantresses**	1998	Evil	Morgan	A novel by Vera Chapman.
King Arthur	1998	Evil	Morgan le Fay	A book by Rosalind Kerven and Tudor Humphries, retitled Arthurian Legends.
**Prawdziwa historia Morgan le Fay i Rycerzy Okrągłego Stołu**	1998	Other	Ana, Anna, Morgan le Fay	A novel by Krystyna Kwiatkowska.
Merdinus	1996		Morgan	By Mike Resnick and Linda Dunn.
**I, Morgain**	1995	Other	Morgain	A novel by Harry Robin and Adolph Caso.
Merlin's Bones	1995		Morgan le Fay	A novel by Fred Saberhagen.
Merlin's Harp	1995	Other	Morgan le Faye, Witch Morgan, Witch Queen	In this novel by Anne Eliot Crompton, Morgan steals Calibur (Excalibur) out of her hatred for Arthur, but Merlin and Ninniane retrieve it and Arthur's son Mordred from her. She is later seen transporting the dead Arthur to Avalon.
The Return of Merlin	1995	Evil	"Fairy Fay", Morgan le Fay	A novel by Deepak Chopra.
The Grail of Hearts	1993			A novel by Susan Shwartz.
On All Hallows' Eve	1992	Good	Morgan le Fay	A novel by Grace Chetwin.
**The Witch of the North**	1992	Other	Morgan La Fey	A novel by Courtway Jones.
Avalon	1991	Good	Morgant	Mary J. Jones' "lesbian Arthurian romance" in which Morgant is Nimue's lover.
Castleview	1990	Other	Viviane Morgan, Morgan le Fay	A novel by Gene Wolfe.
Firelord	1990	Other	Morgan le Fay, Morgana	Morgan le Fay, called Morgana, is a sympathetic character in Firelord by Parke Godwin, where she is presented as a fiery leader of the wild Prydn Pictish people who live north of Hadrian's Wall, and Mordred is her illegitimate son. The original novel was followed by the sequel Beloved Exile in 1984. The series' prequel, The Last Rainbow, tells the story of Morgana's ancestors.
**Morgane**	1989		Morgane	A novel by Michel Rio.
King Arthur's Mouse	1988	Evil	Morgana	A children's novel by Tony Langham.
Last Sword of Power	1988		Morgan	A fantasy novel by David Gemmell (a sequel to Ghost King).
Magicians of Erianne	1988	Evil	Morgan le Fey	A young adult novel by James R. Berry.
**The Third Magic**	1988	Other	Morrigan, Rigan (1) / Morgan Lefevre, Morgan LeFay (2)	A young adult novel by Welwyn Wilton Katz. Morgan Lefevre, a 20th-century Canadian, is transported to the Celtic kingdom of Nwm, to become Morgan LeFay. Arthur's sister is Morrigan, also known as Rigan.
Knight Life	1987	Evil	Morgan le Fey	A novel by Peter David.
The Knights of the Hawthorn Crescent	1986	Evil	Miss Morgan	A children's book by Jenny Koralek.
Broken Stone	1985		Morga	A novel by Richard Monaco.
Out of the Dark World	1985	Good	Morgan le Fay	A novel by Grace Chetwin
Arthur and His Knights	1984			A book by Anthony Mockler.
L'Enchanteur	1984	Evil	Morgane	An anachronistic fantasy novel by René Barjavel.
The Grail Quest: From Frost to Flower	1983		Morgan le Fay	A children's book by Anne Reyersbach.
The High Kings	1983	Good	Morgen	A novel by Joy Chant. In the book, Morgen is one of the nine sisters in Avalon and a daughter of the lake fairy and Gorlas (Gorlois).
The Idylls of the Queen	1982	Other	Morgan le Faye	A novel by Phyllis Ann Karr.
**The Mists of Avalon**	1982	Good	Morgaine, Morgan le Fay	A novel by Marion Zimmer Bradley.
The Moon's Fire-Eating Daughter	1981	Good	Morgan le Fay	A novel by John Myers Myers.
Witching Hour	1981	Good	Morgan le Fay	A romance novel by Sara Craven.
Excalibur!	1980	Other	Morgana, Nimue	A novel by Gil Kane and John Jakes.
A Dream of Fair Serpents	1979	Good	Morgan	A novel by Catherine Darby (Maureen Peters).
The Grail War	1979		Morgana	A novel by Richard Monaco.
An Old Friend of the Family	1979	Evil	Morgan	A novel by Fred Saberhagen.
Arthur Rex	1978	Other	Morgan la Fey, Little Sister of Poverty and Pain	A novel by Thomas Berger.
Merlin: Darkling Child of Virgin and Devil	1978	Evil	Morgan le Fay	A novel by Robert Nye.
Excalibur	1973	Other	Morgan le Fay	A novel by Sanders Anne Laubenthal in which Morgan and Morgause oppose a modern Pendragon searching for Excalibur in Alabama.
The Whispering Knights	1971	Evil	Morgan le Fay	A novel by Penelope Lively.
King Arthur and the Knights of the Round Table	1971	Evil	Morgan le Fay	An illustrated children's book by Juliet Mozley.
King Arthur's Sword	1968	Evil	Morgana le Fay	A children's book by Errol Le Cain.
The Sleepers	1968	Evil	Morgan	In this children's book by Jane Louise Curry, "four children discover Arthur and his knights sleeping underground. With the help of Myrddin, they prevent Morgan and Medraut from destroy the Sleepers and stealing the thirteen Treasures of Prydein (Britain)."
Druid's World	1967		Morgan le Fay	A novel by George Henry Smith.
Sword at Sunset	1963	Evil	Ygerna	A novel by Rosemary Sutcliff.
Three Hearts and Three Lions	1961	Other	Morgan le Fay	A novel by Poul Anderson in which Morgan le Fay makes great efforts to seduce the protagonist, the risen Ogier the Dane - who had been her lover in an earlier incarnation - and divert him from his quest. Though clearly an Antagonist, in this depiction (as is often the case with Anderson's villains) Morgan le Fay has some redeeming features: she seems to be genuinely fond of Ogier and to welcome the prospect of dallying with him at Avalon - though, to be sure, removing him from the field would be a great coup for her side in the book's titanic war. Anderson attributes to Morgan le Fay a kind of amoral Nietzschean philosophy: "My belief is in joy, in the fulfillment of life, which I taught you once and would fain teach you again.(...) What is there about dull Law which drives you to defend it? You're but bulwarking loutish peasants and fat-gutted burghers, when the mirth and thunder and blazing stars of Chaos could be yours!".
Half Magic	1954	Evil	Morgan le Fay	A novel by Edward Eager.
The Sword in the Stone	1938	Evil	Morgan le Fay	A novel by T.H. White.
**The Sea Priestess**	1936	Good	Vivien Le Fay Morgan, Morgan le Fay	A novel by Dion Fortune about Vivien Le Fay Morgan, a modern reincarnation of Arthurian character. It was continued in the novel Moon Magic (1956) and the short story "The Death of Vivien Le Fay Morgan".
King Arthur's Knights: The Tales Retold for Boys and Girls	1911		Morgan le Fay	By Walter Crane.
Stories of King Arthur and the Round Table	1905		Morgan le Fay	By Beatrice Clay.
Marvelous History of King Arthur in Avalon	1904	Other	Morgan le Fay	By William John Courthope.
Uther and Igraine	1903		Morgan la Blanche	By Warwick Deeping.

==== 19th century ====
Title	Year	Nature	Character	Notes
Tales of the Enchanted Islands of the Atlantic	1898	Good	Morgana	A book by Thomas Wentworth Higginson.
A Connecticut Yankee in King Arthur's Court	1889	Evil	Morgan le Fay	A satirical novel by Mark Twain. The tale's Morgan le Fay represents an archetypical corrupt and cruel feudal aristocrat, keeping prisoners for decades in her dungeon.
King Arthur's Court; or, The Feasts of Camelot	1863	Good	Morgana	A book by T. K. Hervey.
The Boy's King Arthur	1859			By Sidney Lanier.
Idylls of the King	1859	Good		A cycle of poems by Alfred, Lord Tennyson.
Avillion or the Happy Isles	1853	Good	Morgue la Faye	A book by Dinah Craik.
The Mantle	1826	Evil	Morgana	

=== Short forms ===
Title	Year	Nature	Character	Notes
"**Guinevere and Morgana**"	2016		Morgana, Morgan le Fay	
"**Morgana**"	2014		Morgana	A short story by Alastair Macleod.
"**Queen Arthur**"	2011		Morgana	An erotic novella by Julie Law.
"**Le Fay: A Choice of Powers**"	2011		Morgaine of Cornwall	A short story by S. E. Lee.
"**Sisters of the Blade**"	2010		Morgana	A short story by Loren L. Coleman.
"**The Test**"	2005	Other	Morgan	A short story by Fay Sampson.
"Igraine"	2000	Other	Morgan	A short story by Debra A. Kemp.
"The Architect of Worlds"	1998			A short story by Brian Stableford.
"Totally Camelot"	1998		Morgan, the Queen of Air Darkness	A short story by Esther Friesner.
"**The Treason of Morgan Le Fay**"	1998		Morgan Le Fay	A short story by George Cox.
"The Dragon of Camlann"	1997	Good	Morgan le Fay	A short story by Darrell Schweitzer.
"The Gest of Sir Brandiles"	1997		Morgan	A short story by Kurt Roth.
"**Just Cause**"	1997	Other	Morgan	A short story by Fay Sampson.
"The Knight of Good Heart"	1997		Morgan	A short story by Liz Holliday.
"**Demon Sword**"	1995	Good	Morganna	A revisionist short story by Bill Fawcett in which Morganna is a druidess determined to stop the tyrant Arthur by stealing his evil sword Excalibur.
"**Goldie, Lox, and the Three Excalibearers**"	1995	Good	Morgan le Fay	A short story by Esther Friesner.
"The Most Ancient Battle"	1995		Morgan	A short story by Michael G. Coney.
"The Rite of Challenge"	1995		Morgan le Fay	A short story by Peter Valentine Timlett. It was followed by "Launcelot's Grail" in 1996.
"**Troubled Waters**"	1995	Good	Morgana	A short story by Susan Shwartz about a conflict between Morgana and the Lady of the Lake, who wants to kill Arthur in Avalon.
"**The Three Queens**"	1993	Good	Morgan the Black	A short story by Esther Friesner.
"The Thirteenth Tree"	1991	Good	Morgan	
"The Queen's Cat's Tale"	1991	Evil	Morgan le Fay, "Morgan La Chat"	A short story by Elizabeth Ann Scarborough.
"X-Calibre"	1990	Evil	Morton	A short story by Garry Kilworth.
"Uallannach"	1988		Morgan le Fay	A short story by Parke Godwin.
"**Wake-Up Call**"	1988	Good	Morgan le Fay	A short story by Esther Friesner. Republished in Up the Wall: And Other Stories with "The Three Queens".
"**Morgan's Lament**"	1987	Evil	Morgan	A poem by Janet P. Reedman.
"The Lessons"	1984		Morganna Le Fey	A poem by Judith Roche.
"**The Last Defender of Camelot**"	1979	Good	Morgana le Fay	A short story by Roger Zelazny.
"Bitterblooms"	1977		Morgan	A short story by George R. R. Martin.
"**The Tale of the Enchantress and the Magic Scabbard**"	1940	Evil	Morgana le Fay	A short story by John Erskine.
"Tristam"	1927	Evil	Morgan le Fay	A poem by Edwin Arlington Robinson.
"**Merlin Met Morgan-le-Fay**"	1922		Morgan-le-Fay	A poem by Florence Converse.
"Ogier the Dane"	1906	Good	Morgue le Faye	A short story by E. M. Wilmot-Buxton.
"The Legend of Sir Dinar"	1895		Morgan le Fay	A short story by Arthur Quiller-Couch.
"Mordred: A Tragedy"	1895		Morgance	A poem by Henry Newbolt.
"**Morgan le Fay**" and "Accolon of Gaul"	1889	Evil	Morgan le Fay	Two poems by Madison Cawein.
**"Morgain"**	1886		Morgain	A poem by John Grosvenor Wilson.
"Sir Launcelot"	1881	Evil		A poem by William Wilfred Campbell.
"Launcelot and the Four Queens"	1870	Evil	Morgane le Fay	A poem by Charles G. D. Roberts.
"Merlin's Last Prophecy"	1838	Good	Morgain-le-fay	A poem by George Darley.
"Morte D'Arthur: A Fragment"	1830		Morgue	A poem by Reginald Heber.

=== In comics ===
Morgaine le Fey, a DC Universe supervillainess introduced in 1972, and Morgan le Fay, a Marvel Universe supervillainess introduced in 1955, are discussed in their separate articles.

Title	Year	Nature	Character	Notes
King Arthur and the Dragon Rider	2018	Evil	Morgana	A series by M.E. Martin.
The Musketeers	2018	Other	Morgan Fay	
Immortal Brothers: The Tale of the Green Knight	2017	Good	Morgan le Fey	
The Once and Future Queen	2017	Evil	Morgan le Fay	
Pendragon: The Quest For King Arthur	2017	Evil	Morgana le Fay	
Kids of the Round Table	2015	Evil	Morgan le Fay	A series by Robert Tinnell and Brendon Fraim.
Merlin's Ring	2015	Evil	Morgan Le Fay	
Armour of Light	2014	Evil	Morgana	A series by Lady Antiva.
Eye of Newt	2014	Other	Morgan Le Fay	A series by Michael Hague.
**Misfits of Avalon**	2014	Good	Morgan	A series by Kel McDonald, starting with The Queen of Air and Delinquency.
The Unwritten	2014	Good	Morgan Le Fay	
Fables	2013	Good	Morgan le Fay, The Green Witch	
Son of Merlin	2013	Evil	Morgan le Fay, Morgana	
Excalibur: The Legend of King Arthur	2011	Evil	Morgana le Fay	In this version, Morgana was raised and thought in black arts by the evil Unseelie faeries, traded to them by Merlin for Arthur. When Morgana returns, she sends Merlin several years into the future, makes a fake copy of Excalibir, and challenges Arthur to war.
Le Morte d'Arthur	2011		Morgan le Fay	
Avatar of the Futurians	2010	Evil	Morgana La Fay	
Muppet King Arthur	2010	Evil	Morgana le Fay	A parody story starring Miss Piggy as Morgana who tries to undermine Kermit the Frog's Arthur with the help of Robin the Frog's Mordred. in the end, after Arthur gives up Camilla the Chicken's Guinevere to The Great Gonzo's Lancelot, he proposes to Morgana "and they all lived happily ever after".
Ghostbusters: Displaced Aggression	2009	Evil	Morgan le Fay	A Ghostbusters comic miniseries in which Morgan has been banished into a pocket dimension by Merlin, but breaks free and returns to the physical plane with a plan to conquer the world and reign for all time. She is tricked and destroyed by the time-displaced Ghostbusters when Peter Venkman flirts with her and set his Proton Pack to overload.
Caliber	2008		Morgan	A miniseries by Sam Sarkar where Arthurian characters are reimagined in the Old West.
Hellboy: The Wild Hunt	2008	Other	Morgan le Fay	
Lancelot	2008	Other	Morgane	Including in the titular role in the volume **Morgane**.
Lords of Avalon	2008	Evil	Morgen le Fay	
Avalon High: Coronation	2007	Evil	Morgan Frank, Morgan Le Fay	A comic sequel to Meg Cabot's novel Avalon High.
The League of Extraordinary Gentlemen	2007	Evil	Morgana	In The Black Dossier.
Mondes & Voyages	2007			
La Quête du Graal	2006	Evil	Morgane	
Saddleback Illustrated Classics	2006			
Beyond Avalon	2005	Good	Morgan	
Dracula vs. King Arthur	2005	Evil	Morgan le Fay	Morgan and her son Mordred are both turned into vampires and become minions of Dracula.
Mickey Mouse Adventures	2005		Morgan le Fay	
Gangs of Camelot	2004	Evil	Morgan	
Femzine	2003	Other	Morgan le Fay	
Just Imagine...: Shazam	2002	Evil	Morgan le Fay	
Morgana	2002	Good	Morgana	
Arthur Pendragon	2001		Morgane	
Tomb Raider	2000	Evil	Morgan Farrel, Morgan le Fay	Morgan Farrel is one of the students of Vanessa Fenway, Lara Croft's old college friend and a fellow archaeologist. later it is revealed her actual identity is of the immortal Morgan le Fay, who has been searching for the time-portal artifact Merlin Stone for centuries. When Lara destroys the stone, Morgan gets trapped in the prehistoric era.
Warrior Nun Areala	2000	Evil	Fata Morgana, Morgen le Fay	In the spin-off miniseries Warrior Nun Brigantia, Fata Morgana (Morgen le Fay) steals the head of the king Bran the Blessed in 1940 and delivers it to Heinrich Himmler Nazis to enable them conquer Britain. The British government calls on Brigantia, aided by the awakened Arthur's sister (and Morgen half-sister) Anna the White Nin, to recover the head. Anna defeats Morgen with Excalibur's sister blade Ganieda, but Morgen apparently escapes to another realm.
Arthur	1999		Morgwen	
Batman: Dark Knight of the Round Table	1999	Evil	Morgana le Fay	
Adventures in the DC Universe	1998	Evil	Morgan le Fay	A different character than DC Universe's Morgaine le Fey (issue #15).
Le Chant dExcalibur	1998	Evil	Morgane	
Lady Pendragon	1998	Evil	Morganna	
Merlin	1998	Evil	Morgan Le Fay	A comic by Robin Wood.
Vamperotica	1998	Evil	Morgan le Fay	
Sláine	1996	Good	Morgaine La Fee	In "The Treasures of Britain".
3-D Classic Comics	1994			In King Arthur and the Sword in the Stone.
**Knights on Broadway**	1993	Good	Tammy, Morgan le Fay	
King Arthur & the Knights of Justice	1993	Evil	Morgana	
Arthur au royaume de l'impossible	1991	Evil	Morgane	
Arthur Sex	1991	Other	Morgana	
Camelot Eternal	1991	Evil	Morgan le Fay	
Jughead's Time Police	1991	Evil	Morgan le Fay	Morgan is a time-travelling rogue Time Police agent from the future who has been mistaken for a witch in medieval times due to her use advanced technology. Jughead's Time Police foil Morgan's world-domination scheme and arrest her.
Martin Mystère	1990	Evil	Morgana le Fay	
Corto Maltese: A Mid-Winter Morning's Dream	1987	Good	Morgana	
The New Wave	1986	Good	Morgaine, Morgana, "The Lady"	
The Black Dragon	1985	Good	Morgan Le Fey	
Les Ecluses du Ciel	1983	Good	Morgane	
Rom	1982		Morgan le Fay	
The Last Defender of Camelot	1980	Good	Morgan Le Fay	
De Jeugdjaren van Koning Arthur	1974	Evil	Morgana	
Knights of the Round Table	1964			
Adventure Comics	1960	Evil	Morgan le Fay	
La Giovinezza d'Arturo	1957	Evil	Morgana	
Robin Hood and His Merry Men	1956	Good	Morgane le Fay	Queen Morgane, Viviane, the Lady of the Lake, and the Queen of North Galis bear the wounded King Arthur away to Avalon after his battle with Mordred.
Knights of the Galaxy	1952		Morgan le Fay	
Forbidden Worlds	1951	Evil	Morgan le Fay	
Operation: Peril	1950	Evil	Morgan le Fay	Princess Morgan conspires with Merlin, Mordred and the "Black Teutonic Knights" to kill King Arthur to claim the throne, but is betrayed by the time-traveller Dr. Tom Redfield who went back in time to retrieve Excalibur from the 6th century whom she tried and failed to seduce, and who defeats them and burns her and Merlin with the exhaust of his jet fighter.
Ibis the Invincible	1946	Evil	Morgana Le Fay	
Sir Batman and Robin at King Arthur's Court	1946	Evil	Morgan Le Fey	Queen Morgan Le Fay has kidnapped Merlin and Batman, Robin and Lancelot must save him from her clutches.
Classics Illustrated	1945			
Jingle Jangle Comics	1945	Evil	Morgan	The disguised Queen Morgan steals Excalibur from Arthur, but it is retrieved by Bingo and Glum and a ring from the Lady of the Lake blows up her castle.
Super-Mystery Comics	1943	Evil	Faye Morgana	
Top-Notch Comics	1940	Evil	Morgana de Fay	The witch Lady Morgana is the wife of the Knight of the Griffin, an enemy of Arthur, and use treachery to substitute Galahad's sword with a broken one, but Galahad wins and kills his opponent anyway thanks to Merlin's help. Later, her men accidentally capture Galahad's squire Garlan and she sends a monster after Galahad when he comes for rescue him.
Thrilling Comics	1940	Evil	Morgan le Fay	The time-travelling Ghost expels Merlin from King Arthur's court. Merlin swears revenge and talks Queen Merlin into sending her knights to conquer England and dispose of King Arthur. They capture Ghost and Morgan orders him executed, but he escapes and helps Arthur beat back the attack using his 20th-century weapons.
Weird Comics	1940	Evil	Morgana le Fay	Queen Morgana attempts to rid Camelot of Sir Gareth, who is a rival to her son Mordred for the hand of Lady Elaine. But Gareth is protected by the time-travelling Sorceress of Zoom (an also villainous protagonist), who wants Gareth for herself and so she decides to get rid of Elaine, who is in Morgana's captivity, and defeats Morgana's men and magic. Morgana surrenders to her, but then Merlin's magic sends the Sorceress of Zoom back in time to the future.
Prince Valiant	1937	Evil	Morgan le Fay	

== In film ==
Title	Year	Nature	Character	Notes
The Kid Who Would Be King	2019	Evil	Morgana	Played by Rebecca Ferguson.
King Arthur and the Knights of the Round Table	2017	Evil	Morgana	Played by Sara Malakul Lane.
Anomaly	2016		Morgan Le Fay	Played by Diana Cabuto.
Queens of Avalon	2016	Other	Morgana	Played by Heather Dale, the author of this musical.
The Secret of Joy	2015	Good	Morgan Le Fay	Played by Mia Christou.
Dragons of Camelot	2014	Evil	Morgan le Fay	Played by Sandra Darnell.
Magic Tree House	2011	Good	Morgan le Fay	Morgan le Fay is a good sorceress in an anime film adaptation of the book series of the same title.
The Sorcerer's Apprentice	2010	Evil	Morgana le Fay	Played by Alice Krige.
Morgana	2007		Morgana	Played by Mónica Garcez.
Perceval	2007		Morgana	Played by Carmen Cuello.
Adventures of Young Van Helsing: The Quest for the Lost Scepter	2004	Evil	Morgan LeFay	The vampiric Morgan is played by Kimberly Cash.
Young Arthur	2002		Morgana	Played by Laura Rees.
The Sorcerer's Apprentice	2002	Evil	Morgana	Played by Kelly Le Brock.
Avalon	2001	Good	Morgan le Fay	
Ah! My Goddess: The Movie	2000	Other	Morgan le Fay	An anime film entry in the manga and TV anime series. Morgan le Fay, voiced by Ayako Kawasumi, is a Faerie princess and the film-only character.
Arthur's Quest	1999	Evil	Morgana	The treacherous and power-hungry Morgana (played by Catherine Oxenberg) is the dark-magic wielding "greatest warrior in the land" King Pendragon's former consort, who travels into future to the modern-day America in pursuit of the Excalibur and the teenage Arthur, posing as his teacher. In the end, Arthur, aided by Merlin, defeats and destroys her in a magical sword duel.
A Knight in Camelot	1998	Good	Vivien Morgan	Played by Whoopi Goldberg.
Merlin	1998		Morgana	Played by Lara Daans.
Prince Valiant	1997	Evil	Morgan le Fey	Played by Joanna Lumley.
Guinevere	1994		Morgan l'Fei	Played by Bríd Brennan.
Gawain	1991		Morgan le Fey	Played by Marie Angel.
A Connecticut Yankee in King Arthur's Court	1989	Evil	Morgana	Played by Jean Marsh.
Avalon	1989		Morgana	Played by Debbie Stevens.
Novye Priklyucheniya Yanki pri Dvore Korolya Artura	1988		Morgan le Fay	Played by Anastasiya Vertinskaya.
Arthur the King	1985		Morgan le Fay	Morgan, played by Candice Bergen, is the "most vile and demented creature on earth" who plots to kill Arthur so her beloved son Mordred can take the throne.
Sword of the Valiant	1984		Morgan La Fay	Played by Emma Sutton.
Excalibur	1981	Evil	Morgana	Played by Helen Mirren. Her young and aged versions are also portrayed by Kay McLaren and Barbara Byrne.
Dr. Strange	1978	Evil	Morgan le Fay	Played by Jessica Walter.
Merlin's Magic Cave	1977	Good	Morgana	An animated feature wherein Morgana and Merlin narrate several folk and fairy tales by reading from Merlin's book.
Girl Slaves of Morgana Le Fay	1971	Evil	Morgane (Morgana)	A French erotic horror film originally titled Morgane et ses nymphes. Played by Dominique Delpierre.
Lancelot and Guinevere	1963			Also known as Sword of Lancelot.
A Connecticut Yankee	1955	Evil	Morgan Le Fay	Played by Gale Sherwood in an NBC live musical television film.
Knights of the Round Table	1953	Evil	Morgan le Fay	Played by Anne Crawford. Morgan believes she deserves the throne of Britain as Uther's only legitimate child, but Merlin has Arthur being proclaimed king. Morgan and her lover Modred fight against Arthur and his allies; Morgan poisons Merlin and Modred kills Arthur before being defeated by Lancelot and dying in Morgan's arms.
A Connecticut Yankee in King Arthur's Court	1949	Evil	Morgan le Fay	Played by Virginia Field.
Adventures of Sir Galahad	1949	Good	Morgan le Fay	Morgan le Fay (played by Pat Barton), Arthur's half sister and a magician, helps him fight against the evil Merlin's magic and the Saxon invaders.
A Connecticut Yankee	1931	Evil	Morgan le Fay	Played by Myrna Loy.
A Connecticut Yankee in King Arthur's Court	1921	Evil	Morgan le Fay	Played by Rosemary Theby.

== In television ==
Title	Year	Nature	Character	Notes
The Winter King	2023	Good	Morgan	Played by Valene Kane, half-sister to Arthur and priestress of the old religion
Cursed	2020	Good	Morgana	Played by Shalom Brune-Franklin, sister to Arthur and advisor to Nimue.
Runaways	2019	Evil	Morgan le Fay	Played by Elizabeth Hurley.
Tales of Arcadia	2017-2020	Good (temporarily evil)	Morgana le Fay	Voiced by Lena Headey. In Trollhunters, Morgana (also known as, among others, the Pale Lady and Baba Yaga) is an ally of Gunmar and a fallen apprentice of the wizard Merlin. She is described as a being of shadows and is responsible for the war between humans and trolls, as well as the creation of shapeshifting troll changelings. She is revered as a goddess by some trolls.
Fate/Apocrypha	2017	Evil	Morgan le Fay	Older sister to Artoria (female version of Arthur) and neglected by her family, thus developing a hatred for Artoria and her reign. As a result, Morgan gave birth to Mordred and led the child onto the path to usurp Artoria. Here, portrayed as unconditionally evil.
Seven Mortal Sins	2017	Good	Morgan, Camelot's Red Fairy	
Oggy and the Cockroaches	2017		Morgane (Morgan) le Fay	Episode "Morgan the Fairy" (Oggy, Merlin et la fée Morgane").
The Librarians	2015	Other	Morgan le Fay	In the episode "And The Rule of Three", Morgan appears as Lucinda McCabe (Alicia Witt), the head of an educational software company sponsoring a prominent science fair. In truth, she is using the fair as an opportunity to absorb the energy generated by the use of a magical app, resulting in a feedback loop that is only broken at the last second by the Librarians. She also infiltrates the Library itself, revealing her true identity. At the end, she vanishes abruptly, but not before warning the Librarians that a terrible catastrophe will soon befall the Library.
Tales of Albion	2014		Morgan le Fay	Played by Julie Carter.
Ultimate Spider-Man	2014	Evil	Morgan le Fay	Voiced by Grey DeLisle.
Merlin	2012	Evil	Morgane	Played by Marilou Berry.
Camelot	2011	Evil	Morgan Pendragon	Morgan (played by Eva Green) functions as the main antagonist of the series. She is a beautiful and ruthlessly ambitious daughter of Uther Pendragon, who dabbles in witchcraft and sees herself as the rightful heir to her father's throne. In her pursuit of power and revenge against those who harmed her in her youth in order to bring Arthur to the throne, which he legitimized, Morgan gives herself over to dark forces that allow her to threaten the court of Camelot from within.
Het Huis Anubis en de Vijf van het Magische Zwaard	2011	Evil	Morgana le Fey	Played by Peggy Vrijens.
The Super Hero Squad Show	2010	Evil	Morgan le Fay	
Batman: The Brave and the Bold	2009	Evil	Morgaine le Fey	Voiced by Tatyana Yassukovich in the episode "Day of the Dark Knight!", in which Morgaine petrifies Arthur and his entire court, forcing Merlin to pull Batman and Green Arrow into the past to combat her.
Live from Lincoln Center	2008		Morgana	Episode "Camelot", played by Fran Drescher.
Merlin	2008	Other	Lady Morgana, Morgana Pendragon	Played by Katie McGrath. Initially a friend, ally, and potential love interest of both Merlin and Arthur (although she is later revealed to be Arthur's half-sister through his father, Uther). She is kept in ignorance of her magical heritage by Merlin and Court Physician Gaius, and feels sympathy for magic users, as well as fear (due to the realisation that she herself has some form of magic) and increasing anger over Uther's unexplained hatred for them. These feelings lead to conflict with several characters, as well as within Morgana herself. She is also manipulated by several characters from the beginning -- including the 'good' characters Merlin and Gaius -- culminating in an alliance with her half-sister Morgause that results in a deep and lasting hatred for her former friends and home. (For more information, see the list of Merlin characters.)
Kaamelott	2008	Good	La Fée Morgane	Played by Léa Drucker.
Justice League Unlimited	2004	Evil	Morgaine le Fey	Voiced by Olivia d'Abo in the episode "Kid Stuff".
Guinevere Jones	2002	Evil	Morgana La Fay	Played by Mercia Deane-Johns.
Justice League	2004	Evil	Morgaine le Fey	Voiced by Olivia d'Abo in the episode "A Knight of Shadows".
Merlin: The Return	2002	Evil	Morgana	Played by Grethe Fox.
The Mists of Avalon	2001	Good	Morgaine, Morgan le Fay	Played by Tamsin Egerton and Julianna Margulies.
A Twist in the Tale	1999	Good	Morgana	Played by Claudia Black in the episode "Obsession in August".
Merlin	1998	Other	Morgan le Fey	Played by Helena Bonham Carter, She is the half sister of Arthur and mother of Mordred. Initially depicted as the disfigured daughter of Igraine and Lord Cornwall, Morgan allies with Queen Mab and her servant Frik, in exchange for beauty and ultimately the throne. She sleeps with Arthur, fully knowing he is her half brother, so that her son can one day be king. However, she is eventually betrayed and killed by Mab, who throws her down the stairs of her castle. As she lays dying, the spell granting her beauty fades. She asks Frik, whom she has fallen in love with, if she is still beautiful, and Frik reassures her that she is beautiful beyond words. This portrayal is closer based on Morgause than Morgan.
Stargate SG-1	1997	Good	Morgan le Fay	In this science fiction series, Morgan (played by Sarah Strange) is depicted as one of the Ascended Ancients, aiding the main characters in their quest for the Holy Grail. The show's version of Merlin "is of particular interest because of her largely benevolent characterization in this series one that differs markedly from more common characterizations. Unlike the other, famous intergalactic take on the Arthurian legend seen in Camelot 3000, the Morgan in Stargate is not a villain so much as a figure reminiscent of the Celtic 'fae' formidable creatures with greater powers than humans and different codes of conduct and behavior."
Darkstalkers	1995	Evil	Morgana	In this American loos adaptation of a Japanese video game series Darkstalkers, the evil sorceress Morgana is an ancestor of the antagonist succubus Morrigan Aensland. Her spirit appears, and is apparently destroyed by the spirit of Merlin, in the episode "Donovan's Bane".
Princess Gwenevere and the Jewel Riders	1995	Evil	Morgana	Voiced by Deborah Allison. A thousand ago, Morgana was the leader of the evil ancient wizards, as well as the original creator and wielder of the Dark Stone. Having been defeated and banished into wild magic by Merlin, Morgana returns with a vengeance after the Dark Stone restores her physical form in her lair in the second season, allying herself with the first season's Lady Kale to destroy Merlin and take over the magic of Avalon. The Jewel Riders must ensure this will not happen and help Merlin vanquish Morgana's dark powers again. (For more information, see the list of Princess Gwenevere and the Jewel Riders characters.)
Castelo Rá-Tim-Bum	1994	Good	Morgana	Played by Rosi Campos.
King Arthur and the Knights of Justice	1992	Evil	Morgana	In this cartoon series, Queen Morgana (voiced by Kathleen Barr) is the evil sorceress who serves as the primary antagonist of the series. She was responsible for sealing Arthur and his knights into the Cave of Glass. She despises Merlin and has great magical prowess. Among other things, Morgana constructed her "Warlord" warriors out of stone and can reassemble them using her magic. Her second-in-command is Lord Viper, who leads the Warlords and seems to be the only human in Morgana's army.
Wail of the Banshee	1992	Evil	Fay Morgan	Played by Susie Blake.
The Legend of Prince Valiant	1991	Evil	Morgana	A cartoon series adaptation of Prince Valiant comics where the villainous Lady Morgana (voiced by Patty Duke & Diana Muldaur) is Arthur's half-sister and Mordred's lover with a great knowledge of alchemy and herbalism.
MacGyver	1991	Evil	Morgana	In the two-part episode "Good Knight MacGyver", a concussion sends MacGyver to King Arthur's Court, where his strange ways help Merlin to free Galahad's lady Cecilia and bring the evil wizardry of Queen Morgana of Caledonia (played by Robin Strasser) to an end.
Battlefield (Doctor Who)	1989	Evil	Morgaine	Played by Jean Marsh.
Hello Kitty's Furry Tale Theater	1987	Evil	Morgan le Fur	'Morgan le Fur', played by the character Catnip, is the antagonist of the stage theater play in the cartoon's episode "Paws of the Round Table", where she tries to steal Excalibur before she is fought off by Arthur (played by Hello Kitty).
The Centurions	1986	Evil	Morgana	A descendant of Morgana named Melinda is the villain of the episode "Merlin", in which she attempts to recover Arthurian relics, and ultimately Excalibur (who she claims had been owned by Morgana before Arthur stole it), in an attempt to rule the world. The Centurions, aided by Merlin himself, thwart them and the villain Doc Evil.
Fables and Legends: English Folk Heroes	1986	Evil	Morgan le Fay	In this cartoon series, she is the villain of the episode "The Round Table" in which she had rejected "the true church" out of envy of King Arthur and became a powerful sorceress "through terrible pagan ceremonies" of "the ancient and dark days of the false druids". She is the mother of Mordred and puts a spell on Lancelot to forget his wife Elaine.
The Twilight Zone	1986	Good	Morgan le Fay	Episode "The Last Defender of Camelot", played by Jenny Agutter. In this episode, she is a sharp-tongued yet honorable sorceress, who laments her modern-day villainous reputation as "horrible press" courtesy of Merlin and Thomas Malory.
The Smurfs	1981	Evil	Morgan le Fay	Morgan witch who is the villain of the episode "Smurfs of the Round Table", where the Smurfs and shrunk Lancelot need to recover Excalibur from her and save Camelot from a total destruction. Papa Smurf manages to vanquish Morgan by turning her into a rat which is then chased off by a cat.
The Legend of King Arthur	1979		Morgan le Fay	Played by Maureen O'Brien.
The Freedom Force	1978	Evil	Morgana	The wicked sorceress Morgana appears in the episode "Morgana's Revenge" (also known as "Pegasus' Odysse") in which she is Hercules' scorned former lover who captures his Pegasus and enslaves Hercules himself. The rest of the Freedom Force, which includes Merlin, rescue them from her castle.
The Ghost Busters	1975	Evil	Morgan le Fay	In the episode "Merlin the Magician", Merlin and jester Gronk are pursued from the Great Beyond by their nemesis Morgan, played by Ina Balin, who intends to trap them in this era. The Ghost Busters befriend and assist the broken-down magician in his battle with the beautiful sorceress.
Arthur! and the Square Knights of the Round Table	1966		Morgana	Voiced by Lola Brooks.
The Adventures of Sir Lancelot	1957	Evil	Morgan le Fay	Played by Laura Rees in the episode "Knight's Choice". Previously banished from Camelot for trying to murder her brother Arthur, Morgan hopes to return if she can get her son Rupert to become a knight of the Round Table. Her plan is thwarted by Merlin.

== In games ==
=== In video games ===
Title	Year	Nature	Character	Notes
Guinevere	2022	Good	Morgana	A roleplaying game were the player is in the position of Guinevere, who suffers from visions predicting the downfall of both Camelot and Arthur and Lancelot, both of whom the player can have Guinevere romance: "Promised to the legendary ruler of Camelot, you carry a secret that may be your new home's salvation... or its destruction." Made by Pixelberry Studios.
King Arthur: Knight's Tale	2022	Other	Morgana le Fay	A follow-up to 2012's King Arthur II: The Role-Playing Wargame, Morgana remains a “powerful enchantress” once allied with the Lady of the Lake. Voiced by Emaline Tuck.
Fate/Grand Order	2021	Evil	Morgan	Both a boss character and a summonable Servant. This version of Morgan is the queen of Fairy Britain, an alternate timeline where fairies are the dominant species instead of humans, and considers herself a separate being from the Fate/Apocrypha version of Morgan le Fay. She is a tyrant who rules with an iron fist, yet her rule is a necessary evil; without her, the fairies and humans would perish, either due to infighting caused by the fairies' capricious natures or due to the Great Calamities that periodically plague Fairy Britain.
Smite	2021		Morgan Le Fay	
Dance of Death: Du Lac & Fey	2019	Good	Morgana Le Fey	A narrative adventure game set in the 19th-century London. According to official synopsis: "The legendary sorceress suffered her curse during the fall of Camelot and has been forced to live in canine form ever since. It has been a constant struggle for Fey to reconcile how the world sees her and her personhood, her femininity, her desires. Will she ever regain her human form, but more importantly who will she be when that happens?" Voiced by Perdita Weeks.
King of Avalon	2019		Morgana	
Empires & Puzzles	2016		Morgan Le Fay	Both a boss character and a recruitable hero in the Knights of Avalon event.
Avalon II	2014	Evil	Morgan le Fay	
Bubble Witch 2 Saga	2014		Morgana Pendragon	
Heroes of Camelot	2014	Evil	Morgan Le Fay	
Sword of King: Excalibur	2014	Good	Morgana	
Citadels	2013	Evil	Morgan	
Legion of Heroes	2013	Evil	Morgan le Fay	A legendary hero summon character: "Morgan was the first human to ever learn fairy magic. Her first use of the power was to grant herself eternal youth and beauty, but her body has not been able to withstand the spell and the surging power has marred her skin. She continues searching for a way to heal herself, and has joined the Cult of Shadows to achieve such ends. She is one of the few on the order who still retains free will." Her secret identity is of Queen Fersona, another character.
Mini Warriors	2013		Morgan le Fay, Morgana	Two different playable hero characters.
Soul Sacrifice	2013	Other	Morgan le Fay (Illecebra), Nimue (Sortiara)	
Fantasica	2012	Other	Morgan le Fay	
King Arthur II: The Role-Playing Wargame	2012	Other	Morgana le Fay	A strategy/RPG hybrid in which Morgan is a half-Sidhe sorceress and one of the leading characters of the game. She goes with her army in a search for her mentor, Merlin, who was kidnapped by Nimue. But it turns outs Morgana worked not to help him, but to increase her power.
Legend of the Cryptids	2012	Evil	Morgan le Fay	An MMORPG card game in which Morgan was added in the "Knights of Camelot" limited card pack that was available only in 2013.
Wild Blood	2012	Evil	Morgana le Fey	
Cabals: The Card Game	2011		Morgana Le Fay	In this card-based video game, Morgana Le Fay is one of the Hero cards used to build a deck in the game. The magical leader of the green colored Danann Covenant also appears predominantly in the game's promotion and is used as the application icon.
Faery: Legends of Avalon	2011		Morgiana	
Kingdoms of Camelot	2009		Morgana	
Runes of Avalon	2007	Evil	Morganna le Fay	A puzzle game in which the ambitious great sorceress Morganna has turned to evil and was vanquished by Melin but managed to escape. Years later, Morganna return to get her revenge and take over Avalon. Now Merlin's apprentice Evelyne must defeat Morgana and save both Merlin and Avalon. In the follow-up game, Runes of Avalon 2 (2008), Morganna was defeated by Evelyne in a fierce magical battle and is apparently gone forever but her curses are still in force and so Evelyne now must destroy Morganna's legacy of dark magic and heal Avalon.
Stronghold Legends	2006	Evil	Morgan le Fay	
Knight's Apprentice: Memorick's Adventures	2004	Other	Morganna	An action-adventure game in which Morganna is a powerful sorceress and a half-sister to King, who has lives in seclusion in a floating part of Avalon since the Great War when she and Merlin defeated Mab. During the course of the game, it is discovered that Morganna orchestrated the monster invasion to keep the Knights of the Round Table busy as she sent her son Mordred in Camelot to steal Excalibur. Eventually, it turns out that Morganna and Mordred have been only bewitched and corrupted by Mab in order to let her escape her magic crystal prison. After Mab is defeated, her influence is broken and they are reverted to their normal selves, remembering nothing.
Arthur's Quest: Battle for the Kingdom	2002	Evil	Morgana	A first-person slashed in which the evil sorceress Morgana is the antagonist of the game and Arthur uses the Excalibur to slay her in the final fight.
Legion: Legend of Excalibur	2002	Evil	Morgan le Fay	In this RTS / action-RPG hybrid, Morgan is a power-hungry evil sorceress who has killed her father Uther Pendragon. The player is cast in the role of young Arthur on a quest to unite the Kingdom of Camelot and destroy Morgan.
Dark Age of Camelot	2001	Evil	Morgana	
Arthur's Knights II: The Secret of Merlin	2001	Other	Morgan	Morgan is a fairy Mother Goddess, a temptress who despises the hero Bradwen because of his rejection of her in favour of Morgan's sister Rhiannon. She tried to arrange for her champion, the Pied Knight, to kill Bradwen, but the situation is resolved without a fight, and Bradwen later also rescues St. Joseph who has been put under a sleeping spell by Morgan when he tried to convert her.
Arthur's Knights: Tales of Chivalry	2000	Other	Morgan	Morgan is a great goddess whom Bradwen must outwit to get the fairies of her domain Avalon to help him against the evil sorcerer Morganor's ally known as the Witch of Winter. Later Bradwen refuses Morgan's advances and frees Gawain from her power, and they escape from Avalon.
Dark Camelot (cancelled)	-	Other	Morgan le Fay	An early version (circa 1996) of the game that would eventually become the stealth game Thief: The Dark Project featured Mordred as a misunderstood hero and Morgan as the protagonist Mordred's "sort of good" advisor.
Chronicles of the Sword	1996	Evil	Morgana	
Marathon Infinity (modded)	1996	Evil	Morgana	A first-person shooter with the mod titled Excalibur: Morgana's Revenge about a space marine's mission is to stop the time-travelling Morgana in three time periods.
Time Paradox	1996	Evil	Morgana	An adventure game where a woman named Kay is sent back in time to put out a threat from witch Morgana and rescue Merlin. The game ends with Key finding and eliminating Morgana.
King Arthur & the Knights of Justice	1995	Evil	Morgana	
Eric the Unready	1993	Evil	Morgana	
Tales of Magic	1992	Evil	Morgana	
Lance	1991	Evil	Morgana	A knight needs to recover the stolen Holy Grail from the evil witch Morgana and save Britannia.
Spirit of Excalibur	1990	Evil	Morgan le Fay	Also referenced in the sequel, Vengeance of Excalibur.
Swords of Twilight	1989	Good	Morgana	In this tactical role-playing game, Morgana is the good Queen of Avalon and a sister of both Queen Gloriana of Albion and Prytania the Witch Queen of Annwyn.
Lancelot	1988	Evil	Morgan	
Dragontorc	1985	Evil	Morag	
Excalibur	1985	Evil	Morgana	
King Arthur's Quest	1984	Evil	Morgana le Fey	In this adventure game, the wicked Morgana, angry that Arthur has refused to accept her son Modred as one of the Knights of the Round Table has cast a spell that plunged the entire land into neverending winter. The player is cast in the role of Arthur who sets out to remove the curse. At the end of the game, Arthur finds and rescues the enchanted Merlin, who defeats Morgana.
Breakaway	Canceled	Evil	Morgan Le Fay	Playable character of a raven-themed evil sorceress character who is a great descendant of the "historical" Morgan.
The Battles of King Arthur	Canceled	Evil	Morgaine	
Smite	2021	Evil	Morgan Le Fay	
Runescape	2002	Evil	Morgan Le Faye	Involved in the Camelot quest series that are directly inspired by the Arthurian legends

=== In other games ===
Title	Year	Nature	Name	Notes
2099 Wasteland	2017		Morgan le Fay	A post-apocalytpic version of the role-playing game Hypercorps 2099 where Morgan and Merlin are among the "Warlords of the Wasteland" ruling this world.
Hocus	2016		Morgan le Fay	A card game.
Albion's Legacy	2015	Evil	Morgana le Fey	A board game where Morgana is a playable character add in the Avalon expansion.
Cabals: The Board Game	2015		Morgana Le Fay	A board game.
Fairytale Games: The Battle Royale	2014	Other	Morgan Le Fay	A card game.
Duel of Ages II	2013	Evil	Morgan le Fay	A card game.
The Resistance: Avalon	2012	Evil	Morgana	A card / deduction game in which Morgana's player must be pretending to be Merlin.
Shadows over Camelot: The Card Game	2012	Evil	Morgan	A card game.
Shadows over Camelot	2008	Evil	Morgan	A board game. The extension Merlin's Company adds the coven of Morgan's seven witches.
Arthurian Ghost Knights	2007		Morgan Le Fay	
Arthur's Legacy: The Rebirth of Legends and Return of King Arthur	2006	Good	Morgana	A diceless role-playing setting.
Camelot Legends	2004		Morgan le Fay	Morgan is one of the playable lords of Camelot.
Weird 'n Wild Creatures	2003	Other	Morgan le Fay	A card game.
Quest for the Grail	1995		Morgana le Fay	A card game.
Pendragon	1991	Evil	Morgan le Fay	A role-playing game where the Witch Queen Morgan is a default adversary and the gamemaster is supposed to "always blame evil events on her, if she is not responsible. Any suspected ill-doing is her fault."
Prince Valiant: The Story-Telling Game	1989	Evil	Morgan le Fay	
Golden Heroes	1985	Evil	Morgan le Fay	The scenario Queen Victoria and the Holy Grail.
Wizards, Warriors & You	1984	Evil	Morgan le Fay	The gamebook Ghost Knights of Camelot written by David Anthony Kraft.
Advanced Dungeons & Dragons	1983	Other	Morgan LeFay	A Lawful/Neutral Half-Elf Cleric/Druid antagonistic character in the Arthurian scenario "The Pillar of Clinschor" in the Wizards book in the Role Aids series.
Knights of Camelot	1980	Evil	Morgan Le Fay	A board game with role-playing elements, in which Morgan if not avoided can seduce the players to enter her service.
Merlin	1980	Evil	Morgane le Fay	A board game by Greg Stafford in which the players play as either Merlin or Morgane.

== In stage productions ==
Title	Year	Nature	Name	Notes
Artus-Excalibur	2014		Morgana	A musical by Frank Wildhorn and Robin Lerner.
Morgan le Fay	2011	Good	Morgan le Fay	In this opera by Mary Knickle, Morgan represents female power on an isle threatened by fearful male religious fanatics exploiting Mordred's unconcern with women's welfare. She is also hostile to Uther as the murderer of Gorlois, and to her own mother. She has an uneven relationship with her sister Elaine, who (coerced by the clerics) convinces her to return to Britain. Merlin appears as her lover, but she refuses him to save Avalon by withdrawing it from the world. Much of the libretto is drawn from Celtic druidic chants, the Old Testament and modern spiritual eco-feminism conceptions of power drawn from contemplation, calm and enjoying nature.
Excalibur	1998	Evil	Morgana	A rock opera.
EFX	1995	Evil	Morgana	A stage show.
Gawain	1991	Evil	Morgan le Fay	An opera.
Merlin's Tale of Arthur's Magic Sword	1982		Morgan le Fay	A children's play by Keith Engar.
Young King Arthur	1980	Evil	Morgan	A children's play by Clive Endersby in which Morgan is Mordred's sister and aids him with her magic in hopes for him to become the king.
Camelot	1960	Other	Morgan le Fay	A musical.
The Round Table	1930	Good	Morgana	A play by Georgene Webber Davis.
A Connecticut Yankee	1927	Evil	Morgan le Fay, Fay Morgan	A Rodgers and Hart musical, in which Morgan sings about why and how she murdered sixteen of her husbands in Larry Hart's witty and final lyric, To Keep My Love Alive.
The Queens of Avalon	1911	Good	Morgan le Fay	
Merlin and Vivian: A Lyric Drama	1907	Evil	Morgan-le-Fay	A music drama.
Excalibur: An Arthurian Drama	1893	Evil	Morgan le Fay	A play by Ralph Adams Cram.
Morgan le Faye	1859	Evil	Morgan le Faye	A play by Thomas Hailes Lacy, inspired by Sir Launfal and Le Morte d'Arthur.
Launcelot of the Lake	1842		Morgan le Fay	A play by Christopher James Riethmüller.
Orlando Furioso	1727	Evil	Morgana	An opera.

== In music ==
Title	Author	Work	Year
"Morgana"	Lord of the Lost	Thornstar	2018
"Morgan La Fey"	Tuatha Dea	Kilts and Corsets	2017
"Morgan Le Fay"	Derek Fiechter	Dark Journey	2014
"Morgan Le Fay"	Avalon	Rebirth of Camelot	2013
"Morgan Le Fay"	Thierry Fervant	Legends of Avalon	2013
"Morgan Le Fay"	Paul Roland	Roaring Boys & Sarabande	2012
"Morgan Le Fay"	Evil Beach	Seasick - Tales from the Deep	2012
"Lurid Bride: I. Morgan le fay"	Turning Point Ensemble	Strange Sphere	2012
"Morgan Le Fay"	Lovespoon	Lovespoon	2011
"Morgan le Fay"	Brigands' Folie	Twain	2010
"Morgaine"	Brian Buller	The Riverbank Faerie	2010
"Morgaine's Spell"	Atham'e	Echoes of Avalon	2009
"Morgaine"	Gypsy	There's Still Hope	2008
"Morgan Le Fay"	Sunspot	Neanderthal	2007
"Morgaine's Song"	Lucid Madness	Gypsy Soul	2007
"Morgan Le Fay"	Wyllow Ravenscroft	Tales of Camelot	2007
"Morgan Le Fay"	Jon Symon	Warlock - Memories Of A White Magician	1983
"Morgan La Fay"	Ricky Dean Fisher	Acoustic Songbook Chapter 1: Bittersweet	2007
"Morgane Le Fay"	Grave Digger	Excalibur	1999
"Beech and Willow", "Four Queens", "The Lady", "Sword and Scabbard"	Anne Lister	Root, Seed, Thorn and Flower	1997
"Gawain, An Aside from Morgan le Fay I" and "II"	Harrison Birtwistle	Harrison Birtwistle: Gawain	1990
"Fata Morgana"	Fates Warning	Awaken the Guardian	1986
"Pani Morgan Le Fay"	Grażyna Bacewicz	Przygoda Króla Artura	1960

== Inspired characters ==
Title	Name	Year	Nature	Notes
Descendants: The Rise of Red	Morgie	2024	Evil	A young sorcerer, son of Morgana le Fay.
Cassette Beasts	Morgante	2023	Other	An egregore of the human spirit of rebellion and the ex-wife of egregore of conquest Aleph (who is derived from King Arthur both in and out of universe). She allies herself with the protagonist, offering them the opportunity to escape the island of New Wirral in exchange for being used for her own ends.
Sengoku Basara 4	Kyōgoku Maria	2014	Other	The older sister of the knightly Azai Nagamasa, and an immensely powerful sorceress who can magically manipulate the sashes on her sleeves.
The Sorcerer's Apprentice	Morgana	2010	Evil	An evil sorceress and the main antagonist.
Red Dead Redemption 2	Arthur Morgan	2018	Other	An outlaw whose capacity for moral and immoral behavior is central to the plot, much like his namesake Morgan le Fay.
Death at King Arthur's Court	Warren Morgan	2016		A posthumous novel by Richard S. Forrest.
Morgana	Morgana	2016	Evil	A book by D.A. King.
The Arthur Paladin Chronicles	Morgan	2014	Good	Novels by David Alastair Hayden and Pepper Thorn, The Shadowed Manse and The Warlock's Gambit.
The Far Kingdoms: Elements	Morgana	2014	Evil	The Far Kingdoms (2013): In this sequel to The Far Kingdoms, Morgana have survived her battle with Princess Arianna and returned to cast a powerful spell that turned all of Arianna's subjects into stone. Now Arianna needs to again defeat Morgana and remove the curse from her kingdom.
Dragon's Crown	Morgan Rizilia	2013	Good	A witch is the owner and shopkeeper of Morgan's Magic item shop.
The House in Fata Morgana	Morgana	2012		A normal girl is accused of being a witch. Upon her death she lingers as a ghost and gains the ability to curse souls, causing those who wronged her to reincarnate and live tragic second lives.
The After Cilmeri		2011	Good	In this series of novels by Sarah Woodbury, Anna and David are confused for Morgana and Arthur in Prince of Time and Crossroads in Time.
Ōkami-san	Majolika Le Fay	2010	Good	An anime series with a character named Majolika voiced by Kimiko Koyama in Japanese and Lindsay Seidel in English.
High School DxD	Le Fay Pendragon	2018	Good	In Highschool DxD light novel series, Morgana Le Fay was a legendary witch in ancient times and a contemporary of the Great Wizard Merlin, her descendant Le Fay Pendragon who inherited her magic talent is a prodigy witch of the Hermetic Order of The Golden Dawn, is the love interest of the protagonist Issei Hyoudou.
The Far Kingdoms	Morgana	2013	Evil	A hidden object puzzle game in which the dark witch Morgana and her minions took over the kingdom of Princess Arianna and bewitched everyone into believing she is the queen. Now Arianna needs to defeat Morgana's sorcery and save the kingdom from evil.
Morgan Le Fay	Morgan Le Fay	2012		A novel by G. F. McCauley.
Morgana, the Queen	Morgana	2012		A novel in an erotic fantasy series The Histories of the Divine Astarte by Jerome Brooke.
Knights of the Lunch Table	Morgan	2011	Evil	An old sister and bully of Artie Knight, a student of Camelot High School.
Schreie der Vergessenen	Morgan le Fay	2011	Good	A film featuring a modern Germany magician known as Morgan le Fay (played by Barbara Meier).
Tales of Monkey Island	Morgan LeFlay	2009	Other	A female bounty hunter.
League of Legends	Morgana	2009	Good	The misunderstood celestial being Morgana is one of the many Champions (player characters) in this video game. Originally was to be named "Morgana Le".
Wizard101	Morganthe	2008	Evil	The dark sorceress named Queen Morganthe, is the second main villain of this MMORPG, where she tries to learn the secrets of the magic of the lost world of Celestia at all costs.
Power Rangers S.P.D.	Morgana, Mora	2005	Evil	Morgana, also known as Mora in her child form, is a servant of the series' villain Emperor Gruumm.
Tears to Tiara	Morgan	2005	Good	In this video game, manga and anime franchise, Morgan is a Gaelic female warrior, a wife of the protagonist great demon king Arawn, and a friend of Arthur (here also a Gael warrior).
Morgaine the Sorceress	Morgaine Fabiano	2004		The protagonist in the series of novels by Joe Vadalma.
Winx Club	Morgana	2004	Good	The former queen of Tir Nan Og (inspired by Tír na nÓg) and the Earth Fairies and mother of Princess Roxy of Earth, of the show's protagonists. She first appears in the episode "Love & Pet".
The Wheel of Time	Moiraine Damodred	2004	Good	
.Hack//Sign	Morganna	2002	Evil	An evil entity originally tasked with giving birth to Aura that traps Tsukasa inside The World and alters his memories to make him more miserable in the hopes that it will corrupt Aura.
Divine Divinity	Morgana	2002	Good	Archmage Morgana is a friendly non-player character in this role-playing video game.
The Little Mermaid II: Return to the Sea	Morgana	2000	Evil	
Phoenix Wright: Ace Attorney − Justice for All	Morgan Fey	2002	Evil	A spirit medium of the Fey clan branch family who wishes to usurp the title of heir to the Master of the clan from her niece, Maya Fey. She first tries to frame Maya for murder and later attempts to have her killed.
Heart of the Dove	Faye Morgan	1999		A novel by Tracy Fobes featuring a witch named Faye Morgan, considered a descendant of Morgana Fay.
Castelo Rá-Tim-Bum	Morgana	1997	Good	A powerful sorceress who lived long, being found in many major events and passages of history and legend.
Beastmaster III: The Eye of Braxus	Morgana	1996	Good	
Warhammer	Morgiana Le Fay / The Fay Enchantress	1996	Good	The spiritual leader of the land of Bretonnia and emissary of its patron deity, the Lady of the Lake.
Master of Magic	Morgana	1994	Other	Morgana the Witch is one of the recruitable Hero units in the game.
Might and Magic V: Darkside of Xeen	Morgana	1993	Evil	Morgana and Xenoc are leaders of a group of evil wizards and sorceress serving of the antagonist Alamar and based in the city of Sandcaster. The good sorceress Astra gives the player a quest to kill them and wipe out their followers.
Darkwing Duck	Morgana Macawber	1991	Good	A reformed evil sorceress who has become Darkwing Duck's love interest and a member of the Justice Ducks.n She has first appeared in the episode "Fungus Amongus" (chronologically, in "Ghoul of My Dreams" that was aired out of order).
Small World: An Academic Romance	Fulvia Morgana	1984	Good	
Knightriders	Morgan	1981	Other	A male character played by Tom Savini.
Doctor Who	Cessair of Diplos, The Cailleach, Morgana Montcalm, Vivien Fay	1978	Evil	A character in The Stones of Blood serial.
The Morgaine Stories	Morgaine	1978	Good	A series of science fantasy novels by C. J. Cherryh.
The Worst Witch	Morgana	1974	Good	A cat of the witch teacher Miss Hardbroom.
The Marrow of the World	Morgan	1972	Evil	

== See also ==
- Fiction featuring Merlin

== Sources ==
- Popular Arthurian Traditions edited by Sally K. Slocum (feat. "Morgan le Fay: Goddess or Witch?" by Charlotte Spivack and "Thoroughly Modern Morgan" by Elizabeth S. Sklar). Popular Press, 1992.
- The New Arthurian Encyclopedia by Norris J. Lac and Geoffrey Ashe. Garland Pub., 1996.
- King Arthur on Film: New Essays on Arthurian Cinema edited by Kevin J. Harty. McFarland, 1999.
- A Bibliography of Modern Arthuriana (1500-2000) edited by Ann F. Howey, Stephen Ray Reimer. Boydell & Brewer, 2006.
- Morgan Le Fay, Shapeshifter by Jill Marie Hebert. Palgrave Macmillan, 2013.
