= Morgaine le Fey (DC Comics) =

Comic book character

- Morgaine le Fey as depicted in Demon Knights #12 (August 2012). Art by Phillip Tan.

Publication information
- Publisher: DC Comics
- First appearance: The Demon #1 (September 1972)
- Created by: Jack Kirby

In-story information
- Alter ego: Morgaine le Fey
- Species: Homo magi
- Team affiliations: Council of Immortals
- Abilities: Expertise in maleficium; Immortality

Morgaine le Fey is a supervillain appearing in DC Comics, based on Morgan le Fay, the mythical sorceress and half-sister of King Arthur. She debuted in The Demon #1 (September 1972), and was created by Jack Kirby.

== Fictional character biography ==
Morgaine le Fey is an ancient sorceress gifted in the arts of black magic. In Madame Xanadu #1 (2008), Morgaine is revealed to be a sister of Nimue (the future Madame Xanadu) and Vivienne, the Lady of the Lake. All three are descended from the Elder Folk, survivors of the fall of Atlantis. The Elder Folk evolved into the Homo magi, a human subspecies with an affinity for magic.

After several centuries of manipulating humans and taking many lovers (including Julius Caesar), Morgaine sets her sights on Uther Pendragon, High King of Britain. Her advances are rejected, as Uther only has eyes for Igraine, the wife of Duke Gorlois. Seeking to meddle in their lives, Morgaine disguises herself as one of Igraine's daughters, but this causes her to be exiled from the Elder Folk. Her sister Vivienne gives her shelter on the isle of Avalon.

In the early 6th century, Morgaine trains her sisters Morgause and Elaine to be adept with sorcery like her. After Uther kills Gorlois, Morgaine blames her half-brother King Arthur (Uther's son) for stealing her and her sisters' birthright. She conspires against him throughout his time on the throne and seeks the destruction of Camelot.

In the waning days of Camelot, Merlin merges his demon familiar Etrigan with the human Jason Blood in a last-ditch effort to defend the kingdom from Morgaine le Fey. Following the fall of Camelot, Morgaine continues to practice her dark arts and retains her youth for many centuries, always seeking power and a new kingdom to rule. By the 20th century, Merlin resurfaces and tricks Morgaine, causing her to lose her youth.

In the series Trinity, Morgaine le Fay works with Enigma and Despero to usurp the symbolic position of Superman, Batman, and Wonder Woman. The trio of villains succeed in creating an alternate timeline with their efforts, but the spell is not entirely successful, as "Despero" is revealed to be Kanjar Ro in disguise and disrupts Morgaine's enchantment.

Morgaine infuses her allies with the power of the Major Arcana, giving them a measure of control over reality. Batman, Superman and Wonder Woman return from their exile and destroy the Dark Arcana's reality-based powers, vanquishing Morgaine's control of Europe. Having failed to conquer Earth, Morgaine seeks the aid of Krona to destroy it instead. Morgaine is defeated and imprisoned in a stone idol, which is entrusted to Jason Blood.

In The New 52 continuity reboot, Morgaine and Nimue are the daughters of Igraine, who is identified as a Fae.

== Powers and abilities ==
Morgaine le Fey is a sorceress skilled in the use of black magic. She previously possessed immortality, but lost this ability to Merlin. To survive, Morgaine wears golden armor to shield her withered body and drains youth from others to restore her own. Morgaine is able to travel between dimensions, nullify magic, and read minds.

== Other versions ==
- An alternate universe version of Morgaine le Fey appears in Camelot 3000.
- An alternate universe version of Morgaine le Fey appears in Just Imagine... This version is a member of Reverend Darrk's Church of Eternal Empowerment and Adam Strange's mother.

== In other media ==
=== Television ===
Morgaine Le Fey as depicted in Justice League.

- Morgaine le Fay appears in series set in the DC Animated Universe (DCAU), voiced by Olivia d'Abo. This version was Jason Blood's lover until she betrayed him during her invasion of Camelot. Introduced in the Justice League episode "A Knight of Shadows", le Fey makes a subsequent appearance in the Justice League Unlimited episode "Kids Stuff".
- Morgaine le Fey appears in Batman: The Brave and the Bold, voiced by Tatyana Yassukovich.

=== Video games ===
- Morgaine le Fey appears in the DS version of Batman: The Brave and the Bold – The Videogame.
- Morgaine le Fey appears as a character summon in Scribblenauts Unmasked: A DC Comics Adventure.

== See also ==
- Morgan le Fay in modern culture
