= Arthur's Quest: Battle for the Kingdom =

2002 video game

- Cover art by Michel Bohbot
- Developer(s): 3LV Games
- Publisher(s): ValuSoft
- Designer(s): Anthony D'Antonio; Larry Herring; David Namaksy
- Programmer(s): Mike Maynard; In Soo Park; Jonathan Wright
- Artist(s): Dave Cash; Ronn Harbin; Mark Morgan
- Engine: Lithtech
- Platform(s): Microsoft Windows
- Release: NA: August 21, 2002
- Genre(s): First-person shooter
- Mode(s): Single player

Arthur's Quest: Battle for the Kingdom is a fantasy first-person shooter video game developed by 3LV Games and published by ValuSoft in 2002. The game follows young Arthur on a quest to slay the evil Morgan le Fay. It is unrelated to neither the 1985 video game King Arthur's Quest nor the 1999 TV film Arthur's Quest, and is best known for its highly negative critical reception.

== Gameplay ==
Arthur fighting the evil dwarves in the first level

Arthur's Quest is controlled from a first person perspective, and the player uses mostly melee weapons like swords and ranged weapons like bows to fight. There are 11 levels in the game, and the goal of each level is to progress from the beginning of the level to the end. Fighting enemies is mostly optional, and due to player's relatively high speed, most fights can easily be avoided. There are no incentives for fighting, as enemies give no experience or points when they are defeated.

== Plot ==
Throughout the game, the player controls the young Arthur. The plot of Arthur's Quest begins with an attack on Arthur's village by a large group of angry dark dwarves. Upon defeating the dwarves, Arthur encounters the wizard Merlin who tells him that the wicked sorceress Morgana is behind the attack and the monsters spreading throughout the countryside, and orders him to kill her and bring peace to the land. Hearing this, Arthur sets out to find the Lady of the Lake and recover the Excalibur so he can use it to destroy the forces of evil and become the king.

== Reception ==
Arthur's Quest: Battle for the Kingdom was released to overwhelmingly negative reviews. It was nominated in GameSpot's annual awards for the title of the Worst Game on PC but lost to Demonworld: Dark Armies. GameSpot's Andrew Park gave the game an "abysmal" rating of 1.9/10 and wrote it "is either an action game with an exceedingly poor design or a fast-paced, arcade-style coward simulator." Park created a video review superimposing lackluster scenes of the game with himself depressingly shaking his head at its dismal quality, and stated at the end, "Don't play this game". Gamers Hell's Andreas Misund stated, "A game that has almost no personality, no gameplay depth, no cool weapons, or even a half-assed multiplayer mode, is not a game I can recommend to anyone." Computer Games Magazine wrote, "You could also gouge out your eyes, stick sharp objects in your ears, and break your wrists, and if that sounds like a fun way to spend your average Sunday, maybe this is the game for you." Something Awful's Taylor "Psychosis" Bell concluded: "This almost became the first game I ever gave a -50, which would have made it the third perfect -50 game in SA's history. It wasn't quite bad enough to achieve that honor, but it was very, very close."
