= Dance of Death: Du Lac & Fey =

2019 video game

- Developer: Salix Games
- Director: Jessica Saunders
- Programmer: Ed Reid
- Artists: Jessica Ambron; Olly Lawson
- Writers: Philip Huxley; Rebecca Haigh
- Composers: Jeff Rona; Jools Scott
- Platform: Windows
- Release: 5 April 2019
- Genre: Adventure game
- Mode: Single player

Dance of Death: Du Lac & Fey is an adventure game developed and published by British independent studio Salix Games for Windows in 2019. Set in 1888 London, the game features the legendary figures of Lancelot and Morgan le Fay as well as the historical Mary Jane Kelly in their joint hunt for a mysterious serial killer known as the Ripper.

== Gameplay ==
Dance of Death: Du Lac & Fey is a point-and-click adventure game seen from a third-person perspective, using an action hotspot system with three playable characters. The player is to be able to swap and choose between the characters and their different abilities. The developer promised "a multi-branching story where in-game decisions impact on each character's resolution."

== Plot ==
According to the official synopsis: "Players take on the roles of immortal knight Sir Lancelot Du Lac and cursed sorceress Morgana Le Fey as their latest adventure brings them to the smog-shrouded streets of Victorian London during the infamous Whitechapel Murders of 1888. They become embroiled in the gruesome mystery due to the occult nature of the killings, which leads them to Mary Kelly: a Whitechapel local with a magical secret who could be the key to stopping the murders. The three join forces to explore the capital's underbelly in an attempt to decipher clues, hunt down the Ripper and uncover the shocking truth behind the killer's bloody rampage."

The game offers three diverse protagonists offering vastly different perspectives in the class-divided society. They are the upper-class womanising gentleman Lancelot (voiced by Gareth David-Lloyd), Morgana who had been turned by a spell into a dog and now can talk to animals (voiced by Perdita Weeks), and the Ripper's final victim Mary Kelly (voiced by Alexandra Roach).

== Development and release ==
Guildford-based English game developer Salix Games announced Du Lac & Fey: Dance of Death as their debut title on 7 October 2017, accompanied by a free comic distributed at MCM London Comic Con 2017 (written by Philip Huxley and Rebecca Haigh, and illustrated by Michael Brennan). The game was publicly revealed at AdventureX 2017 and its demo set in Norway was shown at EGX Rezzed 2018. At this time only a PC version had been in the works, but with a possibility of console ports to arrive later. A 2018 Kickstarter crowdfunding campaign for the PlayStation 4 and Xbox One versions was launched on 25 October but was cancelled early on 8 December without any effect on the PC development. However, Salix Games CEO Jessica Saunders later admitted they have run out of both money and time during the development before the "rough" launch.

The original idea for the game was a simpler story of a man and his dog, but this changed due to the creative director Jessica Saunders' fascination with Arthurian mythology and its evolution over the time, including during the Victorian era. The fantasy premise and elements aside, the game is to be as historically accurate as possible. In that task the team was aided by historian Judith Flanders, who had previously worked on Assassin's Creed Syndicate; Rhianna Pratchett is also credited as story consultant. The game's art style was inspired by the works of 19th-century painters John Atkinson Grimshaw and James Abbot McNeill Whistler.

The game in its original state as released on 5 April 2019, had a major save game issue that was resolved by 9 April. Free bonus DLC packs with a digital artbook and a soundtrack were released on Steam on 1 May.

== Reception ==
Reception

Aggregate scores
Aggregator	Score
Metacritic	51/100
OpenCritic	23% recommend

The PC version of Dance of Death: Du Lac & Fey received "mixed or average" reviews according to the review aggregation website Metacritic. Fellow review aggregator OpenCritic assessed that the game received weak approval, being recommended by 23% of critics. Reviewers commonly praised the game's writing and voice acting, but criticised it from various technical and design standpoints, in particular regarding the "broken" launch version due to the (later fixed) saving problem, and in general often perceived it as uneven and unfinished.

=== Awards ===
The game won the award for "Best Audio Design" at The Independent Game Developers' Association Awards, whereas its other nomination was for the "Heritage Award". It was also nominated for "Best Dialogue for an Indie Game" at the 18th Annual Game Audio Network Guild Awards.

== See also ==
- Jack the Ripper in fiction
- Morgan le Fay in modern culture
