= Out of the Dark (Wilton Katz novel) =

1995 novel by Welwyn Wilton Katz

- Cover art for Out of the Dark.
- Author: Welwyn Wilton Katz
- Illustrator: Martin Springett
- Cover artist: Martin Springett
- Language: English
- Genre: Fantasy novel
- Publisher: Groundwood Books
- Publication date: 1995
- Publication place: Canada
- Media type: Paperback
- Pages: 185

Out of the Dark (1995) is a children's novel by Canadian author Welwyn Wilton Katz. It centres on a young boy who had recently lost his mother, and who has just moved with his remaining family to a small village near L'Anse aux Meadows in Newfoundland. The book deals with his attempts to come to grips with his mother's death, his difficulty settling into his new home, his escapist fantasies about the long-ago Viking settlers of the area, and how these three strands interact. The novel was nominated for a Governor General's Award.
