= Pamela F. Service =

US speculative fiction writer

- Born: October 8, 1945 (age 80); Berkeley, California, US
- Education: UC Berkeley, University of London
- Occupation: Writer
- Writing career
- Period: 1978–present
- Genres: juvenile fantasy, post apocalypse, fantasy, science fiction

Pamela F. Service (born October 8, 1945) is an American writer of speculative fiction for children, predominantly known for the Alien Agent, New Magic, Stinker, and Way-Too-Real Aliens fiction series. She received a BA in Political Science from UC Berkeley, and an MA in history and archeology from the University of London.

== Select bibliography ==
=== Alien Agent ===
- My Cousin, the Alien (2008)
- Camp Alien (2009)
- Alien Expedition (2009)
- Alien Encounter (2010)
- Alien Contact (2010) [SF]
- Alien Envoy (2011)

=== New Magic ===
- Winter of Magic's Return (1985)
- Tomorrow's Magic (1987)
- Yesterday's Magic (2008)
- Earth's Magic (2009)

=== Stinker ===
- Stinker from Space (1988)
- Stinker's Return (1993)

=== Way-Too-Real Aliens ===
- Escape from Planet Yastol (2011)
- The Not-So-Perfect Planet (2012)
- The Wizards of Wyrd World (2012)

=== Standalone Novels ===
- A Question of Destiny (1986)
- When the Night Wind Howls (1987)
- The Reluctant God (1988)
- Vision Quest (1989)
- Under Alien Stars (1990)
- Being of Two Minds (1991)
- Weirdos of the Universe, Unite! (1992)
- All's Faire (1993)
- Storm at the Edge of Time (1994)
- Phantom Victory (1994)
