= The Third Magic =

1988 fantasy novel by Welwyn Wilton Katz

The Third Magic (ISBN 0-88899-126-6) is a fantasy novel written by Welwyn Wilton Katz and published by Groundwood Books in 1988. It was for this work that Katz received the Governor General's Literary Award. It is a standalone book 215 pages in length and interweaves the legend of King Arthur within its story.

== Plot overview ==
=== Part I ===
Morrigan (also called Rigan) and her brother Arddu are twins on the world of Nwm. Rigan is a Sister in the Circle, the First magic, while Arddu is an abomination, feared and hated by the Circle. It is only Rigan's wishes as a Sister that allow Arddu to remain living with the Circle. Opposing the Circle is the Line, the Second magic, and it is growing stronger, threatening the Circle. While femaleness, night, the moon, water, earth, and stone are part of the First magic, maleness, iron, the sun, fire, heat, and desert are Second magic.

Rigan is tasked with a mission to Earth to be reborn there and play a pivotal role in the constant war against the Line. When she leaves Nwm, Arddu is forced to leave the island of the Circle. He is quickly captured by the Line, who use him for his pattern, which is similar enough to his sister's to allow the Line to summon her back from Earth, in the hopes of capturing her to learn the plans of the Circle. The Line attempts the summoning and in Earth's past, Rigan shields herself against the summons. In the present, Morgan Lefevre, who bears a striking resemblance to her ancestor Rigan, is pulled by the summoning into the world of Nwm, while visiting Tintagel as part of her father's TV show. The leaders of the Line quickly discover their error in summoning Morgan instead of Morrigan. They attempt to cover up their failure and a power struggle results with Menw Power-Seeker killing the former Line leader, line-end Sdhe. Arddu and Morgan use this opportunity to escape, venturing into the Line-controlled lands of Nwm.

=== Part II ===
Part II While Rigan has been sent to Earth's past to influence King Arthur as he grows up, M'rlendd of the Line has also been sent there with similar goals. Rigan is forced to hide her true nature as a Sister, allowing M'rlendd to influence and teach Arthur during the day, but exerting her own influence and teachings at night.

Arddu and Morgan succeed in traveling through the Line-controlled lands into Circle-controlled territory, but are wounded by arrows just as they succeed. A vision compels a Sister from the Circle to rescue and heal the two. She has a second vision showing the outcome of the task set before three other Sisters, sent to the north in search of a sword of power. The Sister is compelled to bring Arddu and Morgan to the place where the final surviving Sister of the three would meet her end at the hands of the Line, but not before giving her horse and the sword to them. Arddu and Morgan ride back into the north with the Line in pursuit.

=== Part III ===
Rigan fails in her attempts to encircle Earth by influencing Arthur. Arthur chooses M'rlendd over her, foiling her plans to defeat M'rlendd and stealing half of her jade circlet, influenced with Circle power. Rigan is also pregnant with the M'rlendd's son, a result of him forcing himself on her. Rigan's only thoughts are of stopping M'rlendd and preventing the Line from winning Earth.

Arddu and Morgan continue to travel into the north, a dangerous land controlled by neither the Circle or the Line, but with both in pursuit. They discover the sword's desire to return to the place from which it was taken, and use it to guide them to the place. Morgan, having seen visions of Arthur, Morrigan and M'rlendd, makes the connections between Arthur and King Arthur, Rigan and Morgan Lefay, M'rlendd and Merlin and even between Rigan's unborn son and Mordred from the legends of King Arthur.

Arddu and Morgan are captured by Ysmere, a former Sister who had been driven mad by what she saw as her betrayal by the Circle. With the help of the sword, Morgan manages to outwit Ysmere and bargains for their safe passage to the land of the sword. They arrive in a land filled with intermixing symbols of both First and Second magic in which there stands a glass tower on a hill shaped like a hand surrounded by a lake. Morgan realizes that this must be the hand holding Excalibur rising up from the lake in the legends. Arddu and Morgan enter the tower with the help of the sword just as both the Line and Circle reach them and begin to battle one another. They climb the tower and arrive in a room with a table on which lies a stone sheath for the sword, the Holy Grail and a severed, bleeding head. The head identifies itself as a seer and tells of Arddu's bond with the sword, Morgan's right to the Grail, which she would lose but with which she would always bear a bond, and their journey to Earth, but not the Earth of Morgan, to which she would never return. Arddu puts the sword, which is now known to be Excalibur, in the stone as Morgan takes the Grail, and both are transported to Earth. They wake up to find both sword and Grail gone. The sword in the stone has been found and is being used to decide who is to be the new king. M'rlendd takes Arthur to the sword in the stone, realizing that this must be the time to make Arthur King. Rigan is there with Mordred, and adds her First magic with M'rlendd's Second to allow Arthur to remove the sword from the stone. To exact her revenge on both M'rlendd for what he had done, and Arthur for choosing M'rlendd, Rigan uses her magic to kill Arthur. Arddu tries to intervene but is also killed by Rigan, who then takes the sword and bursts into flames, burning to death. M'rlendd leaves, feeling victorious. He realizes he has defeated the Circle on Earth and whoever claims the sword would become King. All he need to is waiting and influence this person, now easily achieved with no one from the Circle to oppose him.

Morgan realizes that everything has gone wrong, with the legends being unfulfilled, runs up to Arddu and Arthur. She finds the second half of the jade circlet that Arthur had stolen. She combines it with her half of the circlet, which she had received from her grandmother, having been passed down through the women of her family, and uses its power to wish for things to be the way they ought to be. After the magic has done its work, are no more but she finds Arddu swinging the sword, having taken Arthur's place, and that she is Morgan LeFay, having taken Rigan's place. Rigan and the true Arthur are no more. She realizes that they are both trapped by fate to fulfill the events that make up the history of King Arthur. Morgan must raise Mordred, allowing him to one day kill Arddu, who is now King Arthur. She must one day defeat M'rlendd, who is also Merlin. However, she remembers that there is also the legend of Morgan taking Arthur's body to Avalon where is brought back to life. She realizes that one day she will take Arddu back with her to Nwm, where they will once again be free to live life as they choose, pretty coolly, away from predetermined destiny.

=== Part IV ===
In some earlier editions of the book, there is also a fourth part. This part was later removed from published copies of the book. In this part, Morgan and Arddu are once more in Nwm, after Arddu has been slain by Mordred. They are obviously close (perhaps romantically so), and Morgan is telling Arddu she must return to Earth and her time. He is saddened, but she tells him this is her chance to make things right with her life, between her and her parents.

== Connections to the legend of King Arthur ==
- Merlin is a member of the Line named M'rlendd, a magician from the world of Nwm, battling for control of Earth against the Circle.
- Morgan LeFay is a Sister of the Circle named Rigan, a magician from the world of Nwm, battling for control of Earth against the Line, later replaced by Morgan Lefevre, one of her descendants and the product of a union of the Circle and the Line.
- Mordred is the son of Rigan of the Circle and M'rlendd of the Line, representing the union of First and Second magic. Just as Morgan is also Third magic, the result of the union of a Sister of the Circle and a man of the Line.
- Avalon is the magical world of Nwm.
- Arthur is Arddu, the brother of Rigan from the world of Nwm.
- The hand extending from the lake holding up Excalibur to be taken is a physical place in the north of Nwm, consisting of a glass tower embedded in hills surrounded by a lake.
