= Welwyn Wilton Katz =

Canadian children's author (born 1948)

Welwyn Wilton Katz (born June 7, 1948) is a Canadian children's author who has lived in Kitchener and Toronto, Ontario. In 1994 she was awarded the Vicky Metcalf Award. She currently lives in London, Ontario.

She gave an interview.

== Works ==
- The Prophecy of Tau Ridoo - 1982
- Witchery Hill - 1984
- Sun God, Moon Witch - 1986
- False Face - 1987 (nominated for a Governor General's Award)
- The Third Magic - 1988 (winner of the 1988 Governor General's Award for Children's Literature)
- Whale Singer - 1990 (nominated for a Governor General's Award)
- Come Like Shadows - 1993
- Time Ghost (1995, Margaret K. McElderry) ISBN 0-689-80027-4
- Out of the Dark - 1995 (nominated for a Governor General's Award) which was also used by A & J for Lit Circles in Carnduff Education Complex in Grade 6. It was on the year of 2010. The school is located in Carnduff, Saskatchewan, Canada.
- Beowulf - 1999
