= The Queen's Captive =

- Author: Haydn Middleton
- Language: English
- Publication date: 1996

The Queen's Captive is a 1996 novel written by Haydn Middleton.

== Plot summary ==
The Queen's Captive is a novel in which a love story is the second in a series and follows a sexually explicit tone.

== Reception ==
Jonathan Palmer reviewed The Queen's Captive for Arcane magazine, rating it a 7 out of 10 overall, and stated that "what's most surprising in these days of never-ending sagas, the plots of which remain deliberately open-ended so as to milk sales for as long as possible, is that The Knight's Vengeance, due out this time next year, will be the final part of The Mordred Cycle. And I haven't got a clue what's going to happen next."
