= Camelot 3000 =

Limited comic book series

- Camelot 3000 #1 (December 1982). Layout by Ross Andru, pencils and inks by Brian Bolland.

Publication information
- Publisher: DC Comics
- Schedule: Monthly
- Format: Limited series
- Publication date: December 1982 – April 1985
- No. of issues: 12

Creative team
- Written by: Mike W. Barr
- Penciller: Brian Bolland
- Inker(s): Bruce Patterson; Terry Austin
- Colorist: Tatjana Wood

Camelot 3000 is an American twelve-issue comic book limited series written by Mike W. Barr and penciled by Brian Bolland. It was published by DC Comics from 1982 to 1985 as one of its first direct market projects, and as its first maxi-series. It was also the first comic book series to be printed on Baxter paper instead of newsprint.

The series follows the adventures of King Arthur, Merlin and the reincarnated Knights of the Round Table as they reemerge in an overpopulated future world of 3000 AD to fight off an alien invasion masterminded by Arthur's old nemesis, Morgan Le Fay.

== Background and creation ==
Barr came up with the concept of Camelot 3000 in approximately 1975, having been inspired by a college course he took in Arthurian literature. He submitted the proposal to DC Comics several years later, only to have it rejected. He then submitted it to Marvel Comics, where it was accepted for serialized publication in one of their black-and-white magazines, but for unknown reasons the project did not get off the ground at this point. The Camelot 3000 concept was resubmitted to DC the following year, and this time was accepted. DC decided to run it as a maxi-series. Barr enlisted Dr. Sally Slocum, the teacher of the course which first inspired Camelot 3000, as a creative consultant for the series.

Camelot 3000 was British artist Bolland's first major work in the US. At the time the logistics of transatlantic collaborations were difficult, and the series was created using the full script method in part because it was the easiest way for Barr and Bolland to work together while an ocean separated them. This was also the first time that Bolland's work was inked regularly by someone other than himself. Bolland was not comfortable with this and made his pencils very heavily detailed in order to leave the inker as little room for creative reinterpretation as possible. This, combined with Bolland's personal goal to top himself with each new issue, made it difficult for him to keep up with the series's monthly schedule, and the last several issues were late. Barr recounted that Bolland spent nine months drawing the final issue.

Barr originally had the role of Tom Prentice filled by a girl, but editor Len Wein strongly felt that the character should be a boy. Though the series's exploration of gender identity themes (and presumed homosexuality) was published without opposition from DC's editorial staff, Barr recalled that Camelot 3000 received a number of letters from children who were confused and/or upset by this content.

The series also briefly experimented with reproducing art directly from the pencils (i.e. without inking). However, printing techniques at the time were still relatively primitive, and Bolland found that creating pencil art which could be reproduced by the printers was more work than actually inking it. As such, only two pages (specifically, the first two pages of issue #2) were produced in this manner.

== Plot ==
Fulfilling an ancient prophecy that he would return when England needs him most, King Arthur is awakened accidentally from his resting place beneath Glastonbury Tor in the year 3000 by a young archeology student, Tom Prentice, whom Arthur makes his squire and later a knight. The two of them travel to Stonehenge, where Merlin lies sorcerously trapped by the fae creature Nyneve, and awaken him to help them retrieve Arthur's legendary sword, Excalibur. The world is under attack by an alien force that Earth's military forces are helpless against, while democracy no longer exists. Only four world leaders remain, all of whom are corrupt autocrats, while those who demonstrate against the authorities are suppressed by "Neo-Men": political prisoners turned into zombie-like mutants to do the bidding of the powers that be.

Arthur, Guinevere, and Lancelot are presented more-or-less traditionally as the familiar doomed triangle of lovers; Guinevere is reincarnated as Joan Acton, an American military commander, while Lancelot is reborn as Jules Futrelle, a French industrialist and philanthropist. Sir Galahad is changed from an idealized version of the Christian knight to a samurai and devout adherent of bushido. Sir Percival, the "foolish man slowly wise" is genetically altered into a "Neo-Man" but retains his gentle manner. Sir Kay, the court churl, reveals to Arthur that his characteristic obnoxious demeanor was in fact an affectation intended to reduce tensions between the members of Arthur’s court, by uniting them in mutual dislike of Kay. Gawain is reincarnated as a South African family man.

As in Le Morte d'Arthur, Modred is the illegitimate son of Arthur and his half-sister. After Modred's birth, he had been taken away by a peasant woman to be hidden from Arthur, but she was intercepted by Sirs Kay and Tristan. Arthur then attempted to drown the baby among the other May Babies to keep him from becoming a threat to any legitimate heir; but unknown to Arthur, the baby survived. In the year 3000, Modred is reincarnated as Jordan Matthew, a corrupt United Nations official in league with Morgan le Fay who later fuses the recovered Holy Grail into a suit of armor, and along with Morgan and some of her minions assassinate the 4 world leaders.

Sir Tristan is unexpectedly reincarnated in a woman's form. This forces him to reexamine his previous conceptions of gender roles and possibly his own sexuality. His relationship with Isolde - also reincarnated as a woman - is tested by his new body. Their enduring love for one another eventually triumphs, and the two become lovers.

In the year 3000, the Earth is facing a threat from an alien invasion of unknown origins. Reconstituting the Round Table at Lancelot's orbital habitat, Arthur and his knights battle both the invading aliens as well as intrigues from Mordred and Morgan. Their task is complicated by internal tensions including the renewed love triangle between Arthur, Lancelot and Guinevere, Tristan's grappling with his gender identity, Tom Prentice's infatuation with Tristan, and Gawain's desire to see his family again. Morgan uses the fae creature Nyneve to ensnare Merlin and imprison him. Eventually, the Knights track the origin of the alien invasion to a previously undiscovered tenth planet of the Solar System. Flashbacks reveal that after her defeat in the Middle Ages, the spirit of Morgan traveled out into the Solar System, eventually reconstituting herself on the planet where she enslaved the native population and led them in their invasion of Earth.

Arthur and his knights travel to the tenth planet, called Chiron, to defeat Morgan. Galahad sacrifices himself so that they can gain entry to Morgan's citadel. The final battle sees the Knights freeing the trapped Merlin, who takes vengeance upon Morgan le Fay before gathering all of the heroes and escaping to Earth, leaving King Arthur behind at his request. Before Arthur sacrifices himself to stop Morgan, he forgives Lancelot and Guinevere, and wishes that they live together happily. As Morgan prepares to strike Arthur down, calling back to the planet from Earth all of the invading aliens, Arthur uses the supernatural aspect of Excalibur to strike a stone, creating a nuclear explosion which destroys Morgan and her command center. The epilogue shows the fates of the remaining knights as Gawain returns to his wife and son, Tristan consummates his relationship with Isolde, and Tom Prentice leads a crew in rebuilding London. Guinevere finds out that she's pregnant, and when she tells Lancelot it may be Arthur's, he expresses similar hope; indicating that he will love the baby no matter what. Merlin also leaves, noting that he will prepare for when the cycle begins anew, seemingly confirming that the knights will one day be reincarnated to face a new threat. The final scene shows an alien on a distant world being pursued by an armed group before pulling Excalibur from a stone. The group look on in an apparent mixture of shock and awe, while an image of Arthur appears behind the alien as he holds up the sword, indicating the legend of King Arthur will live on.

== Collected editions ==
The series has been collected into multiple volumes:

Title	Issues collected	Format	Published	ISBN
Camelot 3000	Camelot 3000 #1–12	Paperback	Oct. 1997	ISBN 0-930289-30-7
Camelot 3000 Deluxe Edition	Camelot 3000 #1–12	Hardcover	Dec. 2008	ISBN 1-4012-1942-X
DC Through the 80s: The Experiments	Camelot 3000 #1	Hardcover	May 2021	ISBN 978-1779507099

== In other media ==
- The twelfth episode of the second season of the DC Comics series Legends of Tomorrow is titled "Camelot/3000". Despite featuring the appearance of characters from Arthurian legend and brief scenes in the year 3000, the episode bears little resemblance to the comic book series.

== Reception ==
Lynn Bryant reviewed Camelot 3000 in Space Gamer/Fantasy Gamer No. 83. Bryant commented that "the art and mix of the high tech and medieval techs are good. The original Camelot 3000 story seem disjointed when I first read it in monthly comics. The longer graphic novel format serves it quite well".
