= King Arthur's Quest =

1984 video game

- Developer: Five Ways Software
- Publisher: Hill MacGibbon
- Platform: ZX Spectrum
- Release: 1984
- Genre: Adventure game
- Mode: Single-player

King Arthur's Quest is a first-person perspective graphic adventure interactive fiction video game developed by Five Ways Software and published by Hill MacGibbon for the ZX Spectrum in 1984. There was also a canceled Commodore 64 version.

== Plot ==
The game casts the player in the role of King Arthur of Camelot. The evil witch Morgana Le Fey has cast an icy shroud spell on the land since Arthur has refused to accept her son Mordred as one of the Knights of the Round Table. Furthermore, Lancelot, Arthur's best knight, has mysteriously vanished. Arthur goes to ask his old friend Merlin for his help, but he finds the magician's home finds it empty except for Merlin's talking cat, who then accompanies Arthur on his quest.

The game world contains eight areas: Merlin's Tower, the Wilderness, the Enchanted Forest, the Keep, the Chapel, the Crypt, the Cavern, and Morgana's Keep. Eventually, Arthur finds and rescues the enchanted Merlin, who defeats Morgana and lifts her curse.

== Reception ==
The game received mostly positive reviews, such as in Micro Adventurer, TV Gamer, and Your Computer. However, some others have been negative, such as in Big K and Sinclair User.
