= List of Arthurian literature =

This is a bibliography of works about King Arthur, his family, friends or enemies. This bibliography includes works that are notable or are by notable authors.

== 6th century ==
- De Excidio et Conquestu Britanniae by Gildas (mentions the Battle of Mons Badonicus, but famously neglects to mention Arthur)

== 9th century ==
- Historia Brittonum attributed to Nennius

== 10th century ==
=== Latin ===
- Annales Cambriae, anonymous

=== Welsh ===
- Preiddeu Annwfn attributed to Taliesin
- Pa Gur yv y Porthaur (transl. Who Is the Gatekeeper?), anonymous (a dialogue between Arthur and a gatekeeper, in which he boasts about Cei's battle with the Cath Palug)
- Englynion y Beddau (transl. Stanzas of the Graves), anonymous (Arthur's grave site is a mystery)

== 11th century ==
=== Latin ===
- The Legend of St. Goeznovius, anonymous c. 1019 (Saxon resurgence when Arthur is "recalled from the actions of the world" may be a reference to his immortality.; Vortigern mentioned)
- Vita Sancti Cadoc by Lifris of Llancarfan c. 1086 (Arthur wants to ravish Gwladys whom Gundliauc elopes with, but aids them by Kay and Bedivere's counsel. St. Cadoc harbors a killer of Arthur's men and pays cattle as recompense, but they transform into bundles of ferns.)

=== Welsh ===
- Trioedd Ynys Prydein (transl. Triads of the Isle of Britain) 11th–14th century. (Twelve triads referring to Arthur. Others mention Mabon and Drystan, etc.)
  - Trioedd y meirch (lit. 'The Triads of the Horses') (mentions the horse names of Cei (Sir Kay), Gwalchmai's horse Ceincaled.)
  - Tri Thlws ar Ddeg Ynys Prydain (transl. Thirteen Treasures of the Island of Britain) 15th–16th centuries
  - Pedwar marchog ar hugain llys (transl. Twenty-Four Knights of Arthur's Court) 15th–16th centuries (mentions the sword Caledfwlch and the spear Rhongomiant)

== 12th century ==
=== Welsh ===
- Culhwch and Olwen, anonymous, c. 1100

=== Latin ===
- Vita Sancti Carannog c. 1100 (at Arthur's requests, Carannog tames a dragon. Cato (Kay) is depicted as feeding it.)
- Vita Sancti Euflami c. 1100 (Arthur cannot defeat dragon, but Efflam causes it to plunge from a rock through prayer)
- Vita Sancti Paternus c. 1120s (mentions Arthur and Caradoc)
- Gesta Regum Anglorum by William of Malmesbury 1125 (Arthur wears image of Mary; Discovery of Gawain's tomb.)
- Historia Anglorum by Henry of Huntingdon 1129 (mentions Arthur)
- Vita Santi Gildae by Caradoc of Llancarfan c. 1120 – c. 1130 (early version of Malegant-Guenivere abduction narrative.)
- Works of Geoffrey of Monmouth are the main source of information for those writing on the legend.
  - Historia Regum Britanniae c. 1136 – c. 8
  - Vita Merlini c. 1150
- Vera historia de morte Arthuri
- De miraculis sanctae Mariae Laudunensis by Herman of Tournai 1147 (early witness to the legend of Arthur's survival)
- Life of Saint Kentigern by Jocelyn of Furness c. 1185 (contains a version of the legend of Merlin, here called Lailoken)
- Vita Sancti Illtud c. 1190s (Illtud came across from Brittany to visit his cousin Arthur's court. King Mark mentioned.)

=== French and Anglo-Norman ===
- Roman de Brut by Wace c. 1155 (an Anglo-Norman verse reworking of Historia Regum Britanniae)
- Draco Normannicus by Étienne de Rouen c. 1169 (an epic chronicle of Normandy, it is the first text to mention Morgan Le Fay as Arthur's sister)
- Tristan by Thomas of Britain c. 1170s
- Tristan by Béroul c. 1170s
- Folie Tristan d'Oxford, c. 1175 – c. 1200
- The Lais of Marie de France c. 1170s
  - Lanval
  - Chevrefoil (an episode of the Tristan and Iseult story)
- The poems of Chrétien de Troyes
  - Erec and Enide c. 1170s
  - Cligés c. 1170s
  - Yvain, the Knight of the Lion c. 1180s
  - Lancelot, the Knight of the Cart c. 1180s
  - Perceval, le Conte du Graal c. 1190
  - Tristan mentioned but non-extant
- The poems of Robert de Boron
  - Joseph d'Arimathie (extant)
  - Merlin (partly extant in 300 lines)
  - Perceval
- The Didot Perceval c. 1190 – c. 1215 (a rendering of a lost poem titled Perceval by Robert de Boron)
- Le Bel Inconnu by Renaut de Beujeu c. 1191 – c. 1213
- Lai du Cor by Robert Biket (Caradoc succeeds in drinking from horn, proves wife's chastity)
- La Mantel Mautaillé (Caradoc's wife passes the chastity test by wearing an ill-fitting mantel)
- La Mule sans frein c. 1200

=== German ===
- Tristan by Eilhart von Oberge c. 1170s
- Lanzelet by Ulrich von Zatzikhoven late 12th century (a rendering of a lost French tale of Lancelot that likely predates Chrétien de Troyes's famous Lancelot or the Knight of the Cart. Ulrich von Zatzikhoven obtained a copy of the original book in 1194 and translated the work from French into German.)
- The poems of Hartmann von Aue
  - Iwein, late 12th century (German adaptation of Chrétien's Yvain, the Knight of the Lion)
  - Erec, late 12th century (expanded reworking of Chrétien's Erec and Enide)

== 13th century ==
=== French, Anglo-Norman or Occitan ===
- Roman de Fergus by Guillaume le Clerc 1190s/1200s
- Jaufré c. 1180 – c. 1225 (Occitan verse)
- La Vengeance Raguidel c. 1200 – c. 1225 by Raoul (sometimes identified as Raoul de Houdenc)
- Lancelot-Grail (Vulgate Cycle), anonymous c. 1210s – c. 1230s
  - Estoire del Saint Grail
  - Estoire de Merlin
  - Lancelot propre
  - Queste del Saint Graal
  - Mort Artu
- Perlesvaus, anonymous, c. 1210s
- Prose Tristan by "Luce de Gat" (1230s) and "Helie de Boron" (c. 1240)
- Post-Vulgate Cycle, anonymous begun 1230s, finished 1240s
- Palamedes composed between 1235 and 1240
- L'âtre périlleux, anonymous c. 1250
- The Marvels of Rigomer, c. 1250
- Roman de Silence by Heldrius de Cornwall c. 1260s
- Roman de Roi Artus aka Compilation by Rusticiano (Rustichello da Pisa); Franco-Italian, c. 1290s – c. 1300
  - Gyron le courtois (published 1501?)
  - Meliadus de Leonnoys (published 1528 by Galliot du Pré, 1532 by Denys Janot)

=== German ===
- Tristan by Gottfried von Strassburg c. 1210s
- Parzival by Wolfram von Eschenbach c. 1210s
- Wigalois by Wirnt von Grafenberg c. 1210 – c. 1220
- Daniel von Blumenthal by Der Stricker c. 1220
- Diu Crône by Heinrich von dem Türlin
- The poems of Der Pleier
  - Garel von dem blühenden Tal, c. 1230s or c. 1250 – c. 80
  - Tandareis und Flordibel c. 1250 – c. 80
  - Meleranz c. 1250 – c. 80
- Der Mantel, once attributed to Heinrich von dem Türlin (the "ill-fitting mantle" chastity test theme)

=== Norse ===
- Brother Robert's prose renditions
  - Tristrams saga ok Ísöndar 1226 (Norse reworking Tristan by Thomas of Britain)
  - Ívens saga 1226 (Norse reworking of Chrétien's Yvain, the Knight of the Lion)
  - Erex saga, perhaps originally by Robert (text probably changed in MS. transmission; a Norse reworking of Chrétien's Erec and Enide)
  - Parcevals saga and Valvens þáttr (adaptation in two parts of Chrétien's Perceval)
  - Möttuls saga, adaptation of the "ill-fitting mantle" motif
- Strengleikar (translations of lais mostly by Marie de France)
  - "Geitarlauf" (translation of Chevrefoil)
  - "Januals ljóð" (translation of Lanval)

=== English ===
- Brut by Layamon (English reworking of Historia Regum Britanniae)
- Sir Tristrem c. 1300 (English reworking of Tristan by Thomas of Britain)
- Arthour and Merlin c. 1300

=== Dutch ===
- Roman van Walewein by Penninc and Pieter Vostaert
- Roman van Ferguut (translation and reworking of the Roman de Fergus)
- The Lancelot Compilation (an adaptation of the Lancelot-Grail and other romances, 10 in all:)
  - Lanceloet
  - Perchevael
  - Moriaen (Morien)
  - Queeste vanden Grale
  - Wrake van Ragisel (adaptation of Vengeance Raguidel)
  - Ridder metter mouwen ("The Knight with the Sleeve" )
  - Walewein ende Keye
  - Lanceloet en het hert met de witte voet ("Lancelot and the Stag with the White Foot")
  - Torec by Jacob van Maerlant
  - Arturs doet

=== Galician-Portuguese ===
- Lais de Bretanha, five lyric poems in the Galician-Portuguese troubadour style

=== Hebrew ===
- Melech Artus (transl. King Artus), a 1279 Hebrew translation, and the first in that language, which was published in Italy. Contains several short parts of the Vulgate Cycle: the Pendragon's seduction of Igraine and Arthur's death. Total of 5 pages, at the end of a larger codex on calendar astronomy titled Sefer ha-I'bbur ("the book of making leap years"). Anonymous author.

=== Welsh ===
- Brut y Brenhinedd (Welsh chronicle adaptation of Geoffrey of Monmouth's Historia Regum Britanniae)
- The Dream of Rhonabwy, anonymous
- The Black Book of Carmarthen, anonymous (mentions Arthur)

== 14th century ==
=== English ===
- Alliterative Morte Arthure, anonymous
- Stanzaic Morte Arthur, anonymous
- The Avowyng of Arthur
- The Wedding of Sir Gawain and Dame Ragnelle, anonymous
- The Awntyrs off Arthure, anonymous
- Sir Cleges (not closely related to Chrestien's Cliges; set in Uther Pendragon's court)
- Sir Gawain and the Green Knight by The Pearl Poet
- Sir Launfal by Thomas Chestre (a remaking of the lai of Lanval)
- Sir Libeaus Desconus
- Yvain and Gawain
- Sir Perceval of Galles
- Arthur
- Lancelot of the Laik

=== Welsh ===
(All dates for the Welsh compositions are controversial)

- Mabinogion, anonymous
- Culhwch and Olwen (recorded)
- The Welsh Romances
  - Owain, or the Lady of the Fountain
  - Geraint and Enid
  - Peredur, son of Efrawg

=== Italian ===
- Tavola Rottonda, anonymous

=== French ===
- Perceforest, anonymous

=== Catalan ===
- La Faula by Guillem de Torroella

=== Greek ===
- O Presbus Ippotes (Ὁ Πρέσβυς Ἱππότης, transl. The Old Knight; a Greek reworking of part of Rustichello da Pisa's Compilations)

== 15th century ==
=== English ===
- Arthur
- Le Morte d'Arthur by Sir Thomas Malory
- Prose Merlin
- "King Arthur and King Cornwall"
- Sir Gawain and the Carle of Carlisle

=== Italian ===
- Orlando Innamorato by Matteo Maria Boiardo
- La Tavola Ritonda, anonymous

=== Icelandic ===
- Skikkjurímur, (a rendition of the "ill-fitting mantle" story)

=== Breton ===
- An Dialog etre Arzur Roe d'an Bretounet ha Guynglaff, anonymous

== 16th century ==
=== English ===
- Arthur of Little Britain
- The Greene Knight c. 1500
- The Boy and the Mantle (ballad in the Percy Folio, chastity test story of the "ill-fitting mantle" and the horn)
- The Knightly Tale of Gologras and Gawain 1508
- The Jeaste of Sir Gawain
- The Misfortunes of Arthur by Thomas Hughes, 1587
- The Faerie Queene by Edmund Spenser, 1590

=== Welsh ===
- Tristan Romance, preserved in fragmentary form in several MSS.

=== Byelo-Russian ===
- Povest' o Tryshchane 1560s

=== Yiddish ===
- Viduvilt (Yiddish reworking of Wigalois)

== 17th century ==
=== English ===
- Works of Richard Johnson
  - Tom a Lincoln (1607)
  - The History of Tom Thumbe, the Little, for his small stature surnamed, King Arthurs Dwarfe (1621)
- The Birth of Merlin, or, The Childe Hath Found His Father by William Rowley (?1620; first published 1662)
- Works of Richard Blackmore
  - Prince Arthur: An Heroick Poem in Ten Books (1695)
  - King Arthur: An Heroick Poem in Twelve Books (1697)

== 18th century ==
- The History of Jack and the Giants, published by J. White (1711)
- Works by Henry Fielding
  - Tom Thumb
  - The Tragedy of Tragedies
- Warton, Thomas (1728–1790)
  - "The Grave of King Arthur" (1777)
  - "On King Arthur's Round-table at Winchester" (1777)
- Vortigern and Rowena by W. H. Ireland (1799) (a Shakespearian forgery)

== 19th century ==
- "Arthur o' Bower" (1805)
- By Alfred, Lord Tennyson
  - The Lady of Shalott (1833)
  - Idylls of the King (1859–1885)
- The Legends of King Arthur and His Knights by James Knowles (1862)
- The Boy's King Arthur by Sidney Lanier (1880)
- Tristram of Lyonesse by Algernon Charles Swinburne (1882)
- A Connecticut Yankee in King Arthur's Court by Mark Twain (1889)

Bulfinch, Thomas Age of Chivalry; or, Legends of King Arthur

Boston: J.E. Tilton and Company, 1872.

== 20th century ==
=== English ===
- Howard Pyle - In a four volume set including:
  - "The Story of King Arthur and His Knights" (1903)
  - "The Story of the Champions of the Round Table" (1905)
  - "The Story of Sir Launcelot and His Companions" (1907)
  - "The Story of the Grail and the Passing of King Arthur" (1910)
- The Life of Sir Aglovale de Galis (1905) by Clemence Housman
- Merlin (1917), Lancelot (1920), and Tristram (1927) by Edwin Arlington Robinson
- War in Heaven (1930) by Charles W. S. Williams, a "modern-day" (20th century) quest for the Holy Grail
- The Little Wench (1935) by Philip Lindsay
- Merlin's Godson by H. Warner Munn
  - King of the World's Edge (1936)
  - The Ship from Atlantis (1967)
  - Merlin's Ring (1974)
- Taliessin through Logres (1938) and The Region of the Summer Stars (1944) by Charles W. S. Williams (poem cycles)
- The Once and Future King by T. H. White including
  - The Sword in the Stone (1938)
  - The Queen of Air and Darkness (or The Witch in the Wood) (1939)
  - The Ill-Made Knight (1940)
  - The Candle in the Wind (1958)
  - The Book of Merlyn (1977)
- That Hideous Strength (1945) by C. S. Lewis
- Porius (A Romance of the Dark Ages) (1951) by John Cowper Powys
- King Arthur and His Knights of the Round Table (1953) by Roger Lancelyn Green
- The Great Captains (1956) by Henry Treece
- The Pagan King (1959) by Edison Marshall
- Rosemary Sutcliff's Arthurian novels:
  - The Lantern Bearers (1959)
  - Sword at Sunset (1963)
  - Tristan and Iseult (1971)
  - The Shining Company (1990), a retelling of Y Gododdin, which contains the earliest mention of Arthur's name
  - The Arthurian Trilogy (1979–1981), re-issued in an omnibus edition in 2007 as The King Arthur Trilogy:
    - The Light Beyond the Forest (1979)
    - The Sword and the Circle (1981)
    - The Road to Camlann (1981)
- A Trace of Memory (1963) by Keith Laumer
- The Merlin series by Mary Stewart
  - The Crystal Cave (1970)
  - The Hollow Hills (1973)
  - The Last Enchantment (1979)
  - The Wicked Day (1983)
  - The Prince and the Pilgrim (1995)
- The Acts of King Arthur and His Noble Knights (1975) by John Steinbeck
- The Mabinogion Tetralogy (1974) by Evangeline Walton.
- Arthur Rex: A Legendary Novel by Thomas Berger (1978)
- The Three Damosels (1978) and The Enchantresses (1998) by Vera Chapman (the latter with Mike Ashley)
- The Old French Tristan Poems (1980) by David J. Shirt
- The Mists of Avalon (1983) by Marion Zimmer Bradley
- The White Raven (1988) by Diana L. Paxson (Tristan and Isseult)
- The Road to Avalon (1988) by Joan Wolf
- The Pendragon Cycle by Stephen Lawhead
  - Taliesin (1987)
  - Merlin (1988)
  - Arthur (1989)
  - Pendragon (1994)
  - Grail (1997)
  - Avalon (1999)
- The Guinevere trilogy by Persia Woolley
  - Child of the Northern Spring (1987)
  - Queen of the Summer Stars (1991)
  - Guinevere: The Legend in Autumn (1993)
- Knight Life (1987), One Knight Only (2004) and Fall of Knight (2007) by Peter David
- The Road to Avalon (1988) by Joan Wolf
- The King (1990) by Donald Barthelme
- The Arthor series by A. A. Attanasio
  - The Dragon and the Unicorn (1994)
  - The Eagle and the Sword (1997)
  - The Wolf and the Crown (1998)
  - The Serpent and the Grail (1999)
- The Child Queen (1994), The High Queen (1995), (collected in Queen of Camelot (2002)), Prince of Dreams (2004), and Grail Prince (2003) by Nancy McKenzie
- I Am Mordred (1998) by Nancy Springer
- Hallowed Isle by Diana L. Paxson: The Book of the Sword (1999), The Book of the Spear (1999), The Book of the Cauldron (1999), The Book of the Stone (2000).
- The Guenevere novels by Rosalind Miles
  - Guenevere, Queen of the Summer Country (1999)
  - The Knight of the Sacred Lake (2000)
  - Child of the Holy Grail (2000)
- The Warlord Chronicles by Bernard Cornwell
  - The Winter King
  - Enemy of God
  - Excalibur
- By Jane Yolen:
  - Sword of the Rightful King
  - The Young Merlin Trilogy
- By Gerald Morris:
  - The Squire's Tale
  - The Squire, His Knight, and His Lady
  - The Savage Damsel and the Dwarf
  - Parsifal's Page
  - The Ballad of Sir Dinadan
  - The Princess, the Crone, and the Dung-Cart Knight
  - The Lioness and her Knight
  - The Quest of the Fair Unknown
  - Squire's Quest
  - The Legend of the King
  - The Adventures of Sir Givret the Short
  - The Adventures of Sir Lancelot the Great
- By Molly Cochran and Warren Murphy
  - The Forever King
  - The Broken Sword
  - The Third Magic
- The Coming of the King: The First Book of Merlin by Nikolai Tolstoy (1988)
- Stones of Power by David Gemmell
  - Ghost King (1988)
  - Last Sword of Power (1988)
- Anonymous
  - King Arthur and His Knights of the Round Table (Illustrated Junior Library, Deluxe edition, September 1, 1950)
- To the Chapel Perilous Naomi Mitchison (1955)
- Artorius by John Heath-Stubbs
- Quirinius, Britannia's Last Roman by Erik Hildinger (2021)
- Our Man in Camelot by Anthony Price (1975) (The sixth book in the Dr. David Audley series uses the Arthur myth as a MacGuffin in a modern spy thriller.)
- By Parke Godwin
  - Firelord (1980)
  - Beloved Exile (1984)
  - The Last Rainbow (1985)
- The Pendragon's Banner Trilogy by Helen Hollick (re-published UK 2007 & USA 2009)
  - Book One: The Kingmaking (1994)
  - Book Two: Pendragon's Banner (1995)
  - Book Three: Shadow of the King (1997)
- The Tales of Arthur, books of The Keltiad, by Patricia Kennealy-Morrison
  - The Hawk's Grey Feather (1991)
  - The Oak Above the Kings (1994)
  - The Hedge of Mist (1996)
- A Dream of Eagles (Camulod Chronicles) by Jack Whyte
  - The Sky Stone (1992)
  - The Singing Sword (1993)
  - The Eagles' Brood (1994)
  - The Saxon Shore (1998)
  - The Sorcerer Part 1: The Fort at River's Bend (1997)
  - The Sorcerer Part 2: The Sorcerer: Metamorphosis (1999)
  - Uther (2001)
  - Clothar the Frank (titled The Lance Thrower outside of Canada) (2004)
  - The Eagle (2006)
- The Lost Years of Merlin Epic, by T.A. Barron
  - The Lost Years of Merlin (1996)
  - The Seven Songs of Merlin (1997)
  - The Fires of Merlin (1998)
  - The Mirror of Merlin (1999)
  - The Wings of Merlin (2000)
- Albion, a trilogy of historical novels by British author Patrick McCormack (1997, 2000, 2007)
- The King Awakes and The Empty Throne by Janice Elliott, set in a Medieval-style society several generations after a nuclear war. Both novels deal with the return of King Arthur and his friendship with a youth from the post-holocaust world
- Merlin's Bones by Fred Saberhagen
- The Idylls of the Queen by Phyllis Ann Karr
- Eagle in the Snow by Wallace Breem; the coming of Arthur is foreseen by the chief of Segontium in the last page of the book
- The Winter Prince by Elizabeth Wein
- The Dragon Lord by David Drake
- Merlin's Mirror (1975) by Andre Norton
- The Return of Merlin (1995) by Deepak Chopra
- Guinevere series (1996), by Sharan Newman.
- Black Horses for the King (1996) by Anne McCaffrey.
- Camelot 3000, a comic book series that reincarnates Arthur and his knights in the far future
- The Dark Is Rising, a series written for older children and young adults, by Susan Cooper
- The Fionavar Tapestry, a fantasy trilogy by Canadian author Guy Gavriel Kay
- The Merlin Mystery, A puzzlehunt book which focused heavily on Merlin and Nimue having a love after Arthur has been entombed; it offered a cash prize as well as a gold, silver, bronze and crystal wand. However, the puzzle went unsolved and the prize unclaimed.
- The Down the Long Wind series by Gillian Bradshaw (1980–82)
  - Hawk of May
  - Kingdom of Summer
  - In Winter's Shadow
- The Little Wench by Philip Lindsay
- Merlin (1978) by Robert Nye
- A Lady of King Arthur's Court (1907) by Sara Hawks Sterling
- Monty Python and the Holy Grail (1975) by Monty Python

=== French ===
- L'Enchanteur (1984) by René Barjavel

=== German ===
- The Children of the Grail (1991) by Peter Berling
- Der Rote Ritter (1993) by Adolf Muschg

=== Japanese ===
- Kairo-kō (1905) by Natsume Sōseki

=== Welsh ===
- Ymadawiad Arthur (1902) by Thomas Gwynn Jones

== 21st century ==
- The Secrets of the Immortal Nicholas Flamel series by Michael Scott mentions many artifacts and characters from Arthurian legend
- The Magic Tree House Books (1992–present) by Mary Pope Osbourne, feature Morgan Le Fay as a prominent character in the original series. The later series, entitled The Magic Tree House: Merlin Missions, more prominently included elements from Arthurian Legend. Includes works such as:
  - Christmas in Camelot (2001)
  - Haunted Castle on Hallow's Eve (2003)
  - Summer of the Sea Serpent (2004)
  - Winter of the Ice Wizard (2004)
  - Night of the Ninth Dragon (2016)
- I am Morgan le Fay (2001) by Nancy Springer
- Morgan Is My Name (2023) by Sophie Keetch
- Le Fay (2024) by Sophie Keetch
- The Merlin Codex by Robert Holdstock
  - Celtika (2001)
  - The Iron Grail (2002)
  - The Broken Kings (2007)
- Tales of Guinevere series by Alice Borchardt.
- Corbenic by Catherine Fisher (2002)
- Tristan and Isolde (2002) series by Rosalind Miles
- Sword of the Rightful King by Jane Yolen (2003)
- The House of Pendragon by Debra A. Kemp
  - I: The Firebrand (2003)
  - II: The Recruit (2007)
- Fate/Stay Night by Kinoko Nasu (2004)
- The Extraordinary Adventures of Alfred Kropp by Rick Yancey (2005)
- Douglas Clegg: Mordred, Bastard Son (2006)
- Fate/Zero by Gen Urobuchi (2006–2007)
- Dracula vs. King Arthur by Adam Beranek, Christian Beranek and Chris Moreno (2007)
- Orion and King Arthur by Ben Bova (2011)
- Song of the Sparrow by Lisa Ann Sandell (2007)
- Camelot Lost by Jessica Bonito (Jessica McHugh) (2008)
- Avalon High by Meg Cabot
- The Sangreal Trilogy by Amanda Hemingway
- Sword of Darkness by Kinley MacGregor
- Knight of Darkness by Kinley MacGregor
- Here Lies Arthur by Philip Reeve
- The Book of Mordred by Vivian Vande Velde
- Sons of Avalon, Merlin's Prophecy by Dee Marie (2008)
- Sarah Zettel's four-part series about the brothers Gawain, Gareth, Agravain, and Geraint:
  - In Camelot's Shadow (2004)
  - For Camelot's Honor (2005)
  - Under Camelot's Banner (2006)
  - Camelot's Blood (2008)
- Merlin's Dragon Trilogy by T.A. Barron
  - Merlin Book 6: The Dragon of Avalon; originally issued as Merlin's Dragon (2008)
  - Merlin Book 7: Doomraga's Revenge (2009)
  - Merlin Book 8: Ultimate Magic (2010)
- The Great Tree of Avalon Trilogy
  - Merlin Book 9: The Great Tree of Avalon; originally issued as Child of the Dark Prophecy (2004)
  - Merlin Book 10: Shadows on the Stars (2005)
  - Merlin Book 11: The Eternal Flame (2007)
- Gwenhwyfar (2009) by Mercedes Lackey.
- By Nakaba Suzuki
  - The Seven Deadly Sins (2012–2020), a manga loosely based on the Arthurian legend
  - Four Knights of the Apocalypse (2021–present)
- The School for Good and Evil series contains many Arthurian figures, including King Arthur's son as a central character (2013–2020)
- The Fall of Arthur by J.R.R. Tolkien (published 2013, written circa 1920–30s)
- The Devices Trilogy by Philip Purser-Hallard, starting with The Pendragon Protocol (2014)
- The Buried Giant by Kazuo Ishiguro (2015)
- Garden of Avalon by Kinoko Nasu
- Camelot Rising trilogy by Kiersten White
  - The Guinevere Deception (2019)
  - The Camelot Betrayal (2020)
  - The Excalibur Curse (2021)
- Seven Endless Forests by April Genevieve Tucholke (2020)
- Legendborn by Tracy Deonn (2020)
- Reflejos de Shalott by Gema Bonnín (2022)
- The Bright Sword by Lev Grossman (2024)

== Nonfiction ==
- Arthur's Britain by Leslie Alcock
- The Quest for Arthur's Britain by Geoffrey Ashe
- The Medieval Quest for Arthur by Robert Rouse and Cory Rushton
- The Quest for Merlin by Nikolai Tolstoy (1985)
- The Age of Arthur: A History of the British Isles from 350 to 650 John Morris
- King Arthur: The Making of the Legend by Nicholas J. Higham
- King Arthur: Myth-Making and History by Nicholas J. Higham
- The Development of Arthurian Romance by Roger Sherman Loomis
- Arthurian Literature in the Middle Ages edited by Roger Sherman Loomis

== Depictions in other media ==
- List of works based on Arthurian legends
