= The Firebrand =

The Firebrand may refer to:

- The Firebrand (1922 film), a silent film directed by Alan James
- The Firebrand (1962 film), a film directed by Maury Dexter
- The Firebrand (Bradley novel), a 1987 novel by Marion Zimmer Bradley
- The Firebrand (Kemp novel), a 2003 novel by Debra A. Kemp
- The Firebrand (anarchist publication), which became Free Society in 1897

== See also ==
- Firebrand (disambiguation)
- The Firebrand of Florence, a Broadway operetta
