= The Fort at River's Bend =

1997 novel by Jack Whyte

- First edition
- Author: Jack Whyte
- Original title: The Sorcerer Volume 1 — The Fort At River’s Bend
- Cover artist: Branislav Perkovic
- Language: English
- Series: A Dream of Eagles (AKA The Camulod Chronicles in the USA)
- Genre: Historical novel
- Publisher: Viking Canada
- Publication date: 1997
- Publication place: Canada
- Media type: Print (Hardback & Paperback)
- Pages: 534 pp
- ISBN: 0-670-86763-2
- OCLC: 411222812
- Preceded by: The Saxon Shore
- Followed by: The Sorcerer – Metamorphosis

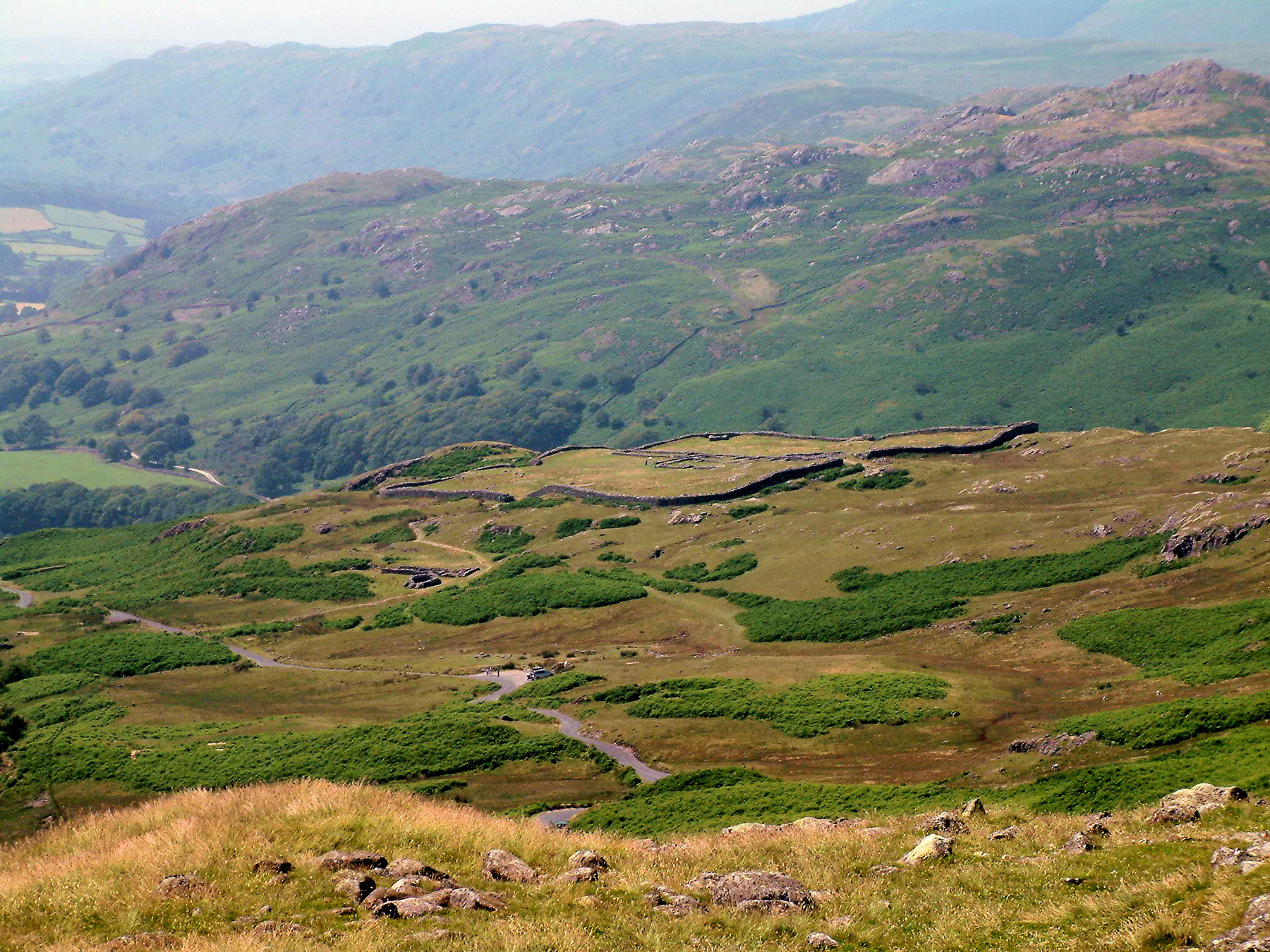
Mediobogdum from Hardknott Pass in the English Lake District

The Fort at River's Bend is a 1997 historical novel by Jack Whyte. Written as part of a single book, The Sorcerer, it was split for publishing purposes. The book encompasses the beginning of Arthur's education at a long abandoned Roman fort, where he is taught most of the skills needed to rule, and fight for, the people of Britain. The novel is part of the Camulod Chronicles, a series of books which devise the context in which the Arthurian legend could have been placed had it been historically founded.

== Publication history ==
Written as part of "an 1,100-page monster called The Sorcerer", Jack Whyte's Canadian publishers split the text for ease of publication into two books, The Sorcerer Volume 1—The Fort At River's Bend and The Sorcerer Volume 2—Metamorphosis. However, when the book was imported to the United States, the publisher labelled the books The Fort At River's Bend and The Sorcerer - Metamorphisis. Because of this many of the American readers think they are two separate books but the incomplete nature of the plots, and Jack Whyte's original intentions, make them inapproachable without reading them together. Jack Whyte think this is an effect of "foolish" marketers, and openly criticizes this move by the publishers. As expressed in an interview, the books, though they were only released three months apart, saw a considerable decline in sales because people were unaware that the two books were really one volume.

== Plot ==
=== Book One : Ravenglass ===
The Party of Merlyn and Arthur arrive at Ravenglass and are welcomed by King Derek. Upon their arrival they find out that the commander of the sons of Condran's navy, Liam, is also in the port. The crews are both unarmed, because Derek maintains the port of Ravenglass as a neutral, weapons-free zone, but Liam has hostile intentions for his visit. After Merlyn arrives, Liam attempts to capture Ravenglass in order to turn it into his own kingdom. Shelagh, however, is able to kill Liam before his crew captures the king. They slaughter the crews of the ships in port but find out that the rest of his fleet is supposed to land to help take the city. Merlyn and his party arrange the defenses of Ravenglass and, along with the help of the local people, are able to repel and intimidate the fleet into flight.

Merlyn had approached Ravenglass in order to find a place to safely raise Arthur away from enemies at home. Derek had refused Merlyn sanctuary. However, since they helped in the defence of his kingdom, he agrees for Merlyn to move his people to a Roman fort Mediobogdum, a Roman fort on the edge of Ravenglass's lands. The party moves to the fort and Dedalus is able to rebuild the baths, while the rest of the party works on rebuilding several of the barracks.

The Party remains at Mediobogdum for several years after. While there Merlyn commissions duplicates of the sword cast by Publius Varrus from the Lady of the Lake statue. They are used, along with a method developed using wooden Roman practice swords, to train Arthur and his friends how to fight. Before the end of this book, a raiding party from the Sons of Chondran try to attack the city but are cast upon the shore by a violent storm. Merlyn uses this event to teach Arthur of the value of human lives. By the end of the chapter, Merlyn has become romantically involved with a woman from Ravenglass who, along with forty others from the town, have been brought to settle in the fort to help maintain its productivity.

=== Book Two : Mediobogdum ===
On a previous visit Merlyn and Ambrosius had decided that a garrison should support Merlyn's party, and that expedition arrives at the beginning of the book. The party continues to live at Mediobogdum, and Arthur shows his prowess as a leader, deciding to begin training some of his other friends from Ravenglass in the combat style that Merlyn designed for him.

A winter has many negative events: Lucanus dies, Rufio, one of Merlyn warrior companions, is attacked by a bear and loses the use of his right arm and news of Ironhair causing political problems in Cambria reaches Merlyn via a letter from Ambrosius. Because of the letter, Merlyn decides that it would be best to return to Camulod to assist in the military campaign soon to ensue.

== Characters ==
- Ambrosius Brittanicus - Merlyn's identical half-brother, fathered by Picus Brittanticus unknowingly while recuperating from a near-death experience. Ambrosius was a successful commander in the army of Vortigern, and becomes the commander of the Camulodian forces while Merlyn is away.
- Arthur Pendragon - the bastard son of Uther Pendragon and legitimate heir to three kingships in the British Isles. This book follows him from early childhood to adolescence, watching him grow from a child with surprising insight to a leader of a band of friends, including Gwin, Ghilleadh, and Bedwyr. He often expresses surprising insights into the nature of man, military tactics and problem solving, and has a strong sense of justice.
- Caius Merlyn Brittanicus - the narrator of the story and former commander of the Camulodian military. At the beginning of the book he takes a vow of chastity and believes he has leprosy, however these both change later. He has named himself the guardian and teacher of Arthur, wishing to ensure that Arthur will be able to claim the throne of Pendragon. He has chosen to go by the name Cay throughout the book in order to escape his reputation as Merlyn. He is exceptionally schooled in Roman history, military tactics, and weapons.
- Dedulus - an expert warrior and former centurion of Camulod's army, he is one of the tutors of Arthur, training him in combat and tactics. He is often called Ded.
- Donuil - a prince of the Scots who has acted as Merlyn's aide-de-camp. His unusual size and years of training in Camulod while Merlyn's prisoner of war, then friend, make him an exceptional man of Éire who can fight with tactics and ride as cavalry. He is married to Shelagh.
- Lucanus - a physician educated in Galenic Medicine Cairo. He is a close friend of Merlyn and is one of Arthur's tutors. Lucanus dies at the end of the book.
- Shelagh - the wife of Donuil and de facto caretaker of Arthur and his friends, as two of his friends are her sons. She also is the head lady of the household in Mediobogdum and arranged Merlyn's liaison with Tress. In The Saxon Shore, Merlyn discovers that she has the same predictive dreams that he experienced through much of his life.
- Tress - a barren seamstress from Ravenglass who becomes Merlyn's mistress. She becomes arthur's mother figure as her relationship with Merlyn deepens.

== Political entities ==
The political entities of Jack Whyte's books are:

Cambria - the land of Pendragon rule in modern Wales. Though initially ruled by Dergyll ap Griffyd, a cousin of Uther Pendragon, Dergyll is killed by Merlyn's political enemy Ironhair in order to allow Ironhair's contender to gain the throne. Arthur has a stronger claim to the throne than both of these men because he is Uther's son.

Camulod - a Roman colony established in modern South-Western England. The establishment of this colony is depicted in the earlier books in the "A Dream of Eagles" Series. Politically, the region is ruled by a council of respected individuals within the colony, a number of whom are military rulers or members of the families which control the twelve villas which govern the lands. Their military strength is concentrated in their cavalry, which is far advanced compared to Celtic horsemen because of stirrup technology as well as the Roman-bred horse stock.

Northumbria - a kingdom in modern Northern England. It is ruled by King Vortigern. However, his Danish mercenaries have slowly gained power over him and by the end of the book appear to be in open revolt, challenging his rule.

Picts - a people north of Hadrian's Wall. One kingdom is begging to gain political power during this period ruled by Crandal, the grandfather of another child sired by Uther who may have claim to the Pendragon throne.

Ravenglass - a city kingdom governed by King Derek, the man responsible for Uther's death. The city of Ravenglass is considered a safe and neutral port for all nations of the British Isles. Because of this, visitors must travel unarmed within the city premises.

Sons of Condran - tribe on the Isle of Éire that is politically opposed to the Scots. Their home regions are to the north of the Scots. The head of the clan is Condran, and Brian, one of his sons, is the commander of the Army. Several major defeats of their forces by Brand and Conner of the Scots leave their forces so weak that they are unable to resist further settlement by the Scots in their land.

The Scots or Gaels - a Celtic tribal group that is ruled by the King Athol. The Kingdom is focused on the Western Coastal corridor of Ireland where Athol's Stronghold is located. The region is mostly heavily forested land. This is the group referred to by the Romans as the Scotii. They are colonizing Caledonia, a land occupied by the Picts in modern Scotland.

== Historical site ==
The bulk of the book takes place at a fort named Mediobogdum, 9 miles east of Ravenglass. Today the site is known as the Hardknott Roman Fort. While writing the book Jack Whyte was taken by his brother to the site and became inspired by it. In the text, a several week visit to the fort shapes the depictions of Merlyn's fort in the novel. All of the facilities described in the book, including the lavish bath and cement foundations for the barracks, are based on the archeological evidence available at the site.

== Reconciling the legend ==
While hiding near Ravenglass, Merlyn goes by the name Master Cay, a nickname derived from his inherited "Caius". He and Arthur leave Ravenglass by boat, then return by land under the guise of Merlyn as Master Cay and Arthur as his apprentice. This seems to be a reference to Kay in the Arthurian legend
