= The Eagles' Brood =

1994 novel by Jack Whyte

- First edition (Canadian)
- Author: Jack Whyte
- Cover artist: Branislav Perkovic
- Series: A Dream of Eagles (AKA The Camulod Chronicles in the USA)
- Genre: Historical novel
- Publisher: Tor Books Penguin Books
- Publication date: 1994
- Publication place: Canada
- Media type: Print (Hardback & Paperback_
- Preceded by: The Singing Sword
- Followed by: The Saxon Shore

The Eagles' Brood is a 1994 historical novel by Jack Whyte set in post-Roman Britain. It is the third in Whyte's series The Camulod Chronicles. The novel develops the relationship between Merlyn and Uther as the two become military leaders of Camulod.

== Reception ==
When Michelle Ziegler reviewed the novel in the academic journal The Heroic Age, she emphasized that Whyte sometimes gets bogged down in details and noted a few "historical stumbles". Overall, however, she called the novel along with the next book in the series The Saxon Shore "interesting and engrossing". Ziegler also noted the use of conventions of the mystery genre to keep the plot entertaining. Kirkus review also received the novel positively and called it "another dipful from the fertile Arthurian well, sans magic but brimful of action." Similarly Publishers Weekly said that "in graphic realism lies its fascination, and its power."
