= The Saxon Shore =

1995 novel by Jack Whyte

- First edition (Canadian)
- Author: Jack Whyte
- Cover artist: John Harris
- Language: English
- Series: A Dream of Eagles (AKA The Camulod Chronicles in the USA)
- Genre: Historical novel
- Publisher: Viking Canada
- Publication date: 1995
- Publication place: Canada
- Media type: Print (Paperback (French Flaps))
- Pages: 769
- ISBN: 0-670-84522-1
- Preceded by: The Eagles' Brood
- Followed by: The Fort at River's Bend

The Saxon Shore is a 1995 novel by Canadian writer Jack Whyte chronicling Caius Merlyn Britannicus's effort to return the baby Arthur to the colony of Camulod and the political events surrounding this. The book is a portrayal of the Arthurian Legend set against the backdrop of Post-Roman Britain's invasion by Germanic peoples. It is part of the A Dream of Eagles series, which attempts to explain the origins of the Arthurian legends against the backdrop of a historical setting. This is a deviation from other modern depictions of King Arthur such as Once and Future King and the Avalon Series which rely much more on mystical and magical elements and less on the historical.

== Plot ==
The Preface explains this style as Merlyn writing his memoir of how he met Arthur and came to raise him.

Cornwall

Saxon Shore begins with Merlyn and the infant Arthur stranded in a small boat on the southernmost extreme of the Irish Sea. An Irish pirate ship captained by Connor, a prince of Eire, captures the boat. The Celts then throw the child overboard. Disregarding his life, Merlyn kills one of the pirates and jumps in after Arthur. The pirates recapture Merlyn and the floating child and return them to the ship. The captain greets Merlyn and the child, revealing the origin of the crew, Eire, and tries to understand the reasons why Merlyn would sacrifice his life for the child. In the conversation, the captain comes to realize that his brother, Donuil is Merlyn's captive at Camulod, so he releases Merlyn in the agreement that the child will be returned if his brother returns to Eire.

Merlyn then proceeds home, where he quickly becomes embroiled in factions politics that have arisen in the Camulodian council. By using his military authority and appealing to the older council, Merlyn disbands the parties. Ironhair, one of the faction leaders, becomes enraged by this and makes an assassination attempt on Merlyn's life. Meanwhile, Donuil returns to Camulod with Merlyn's nearly identical half-brother Ambrose. Once Donuil returns, Merlyn creates a party which is to escort Donuil back to Eire.

On the trip to Eire the party has encounters with a leper colony, where Lucanus, a physician and Merlyn's longtime friend, leaves the party to deliver a wagon-load of supplies to the impoverished lepers. When the party arrives there, a crew of marauders was harvesting marble from a variety of buildings in Glevum: a Roman temple, and a large and impressive administrative basilica and forum market-place. Merlyn decides that they will be unable to gain passage on any ships there, after a brief skirmish with the locals.

Eire

After the encounter with the scavengers, a group of Scots sent by Donuil's father to ensure his safe return find the party. Soon the two galleys of the Scots are hauling a barge to Eire where the barge capsizes south of Athol's kingdom. The Comuludian knights travel through the Irish wilderness under threat of barbaric peoples, but only encounter a boar larger than any other ever hunted by the Scots. Within several weeks of leaving Comulud the party arrives in the capital of Athol's kingdom.

The party stays at the stronghold and Merlyn, in conversation with Athol, reveals that he was married to one of Athol's daughters, Deirdre. Athol accepts Merlyn into his family. During the same conversation Merlyn also reveals the identity of the child, Arthur, and Athol pledges himself as an ally to Merlyn and his grandson. While staying in the stronghold of the Scots, Merlyn and his men demonstrate the use of cavalry to the Scots who had previously never seen its use in battle. During the exhibition a bear enters the clearing and attacks. Merlyn uses his memory of Alexander the Great's bodyguard using Sarissa, heavy lances, to charge troops, acquiring a spear from infantry that were to be part of the demonstration and charging the bear.

One evening, a member of the community disappears and, while searching for said man, Donuil feels that someone was watching in the woods. Merlyn's retinue and Athol's warriors are put on alert, and in the morning an army attacks the walls. The strength of the cavalry successfully routes the attacking army in two charges. The attack of the wild men of the south is an unruly advance force of the eminent attack by the MacNyalls, Sons of Condran, and Sons of Garn. Athol decides that Merlyn, Arthur, Donuil and their company must return to Briton to avoid this attack and ensure Arthur's safety.

The Saxon Shore

The party of Merlyn returns to Camulod without Donuil, who returns to Eire in order to stave off the events of one of Merlyn's dreams. While traveling back to Camulod the party encounters a group of marauding Berbers. Upon returning to Camulod, Merlyn discovers his half brother Ambrose has integrated the infantry and cavalry in order to reduce enmity between the two military branches. A group of Cambrian raid an outlying farm of the colony, however before the military can follow a heavy winter sets in that kills the oldest members of the community.

In the spring a large contingent of the military, 500 foot soldiers and 500 cavalry, leave Camulod to take revenge for the raid which killed 50 of their comrades. Led by Merlyn, the force travels near the leper colony that was visited with Lucanus and the whole colony is found dead. The military force also clears the Berbers from their pirate outpost in Glevum. The army enters Cambria and soon find the men who had stolen the horses dead, they then encounter a force of Dergyll's archers, however Merlyn tactfully avoids any confrontation. The two leaders agree to an alliance and in proof of their loyalty to the alliance, they exchange a small contingent of auxiliary forces. While discussing this Merlyn discovers that Ironhair, who had led one of the political parties in Camulod, was now supporting a contender for the Pendragon throne.

Merlyn and the forces return to Camulod and years of peace ensue. Merlyn and Ambrose make a trip to Northumberland and discover that the alliance between Briton-Romans and the Norse that had maintained the strength of the kingdom is failing. They return to Britain and begin the education of Arthur, along with the other family and friends of Merlyn. An attempt is made on Arthur's life by a group of men loyal to Ironhair, and the council of friends which had come to surround Merlyn decided that in order to protect this future king he must live outside of the community which knows of his existence. Merlyn decides to settle Arthur in Ravenglass south of Hadrian's Wall.

Epilogue

Arthur and Merlyn travel to Ravenglass aboard Connor's galley and are welcomed by the Ravenglass King Derek.

== Characters ==
- Caius Merlyn Britanicus - a member of one of the oldest families in Camulod. He has inherited the command of the colonies military forces because of this. His wife has died 3 years before the beginning of the book. He has been educated by Druids along with his Roman elders, who have taught him much about both occult Celtic knowledge and Roman military tactics and understanding respectively. Merlyn was previously married to the daughter of King Athol of the Scots, Deirdre. Merlyn has dreams that often become true.
- Arthur Pendragon - the heir to Uther Pendragon. He is the illegitimate son of Uther and Ygraine, Lot's wife. His mother was the daughter of Athol Mac Iain. Because of this Arthur could potentially claim the thrones of Cambria, the Scots, and Cornwall. Merlyn also intends to raise the child as if he is his own, adopting him so as to allow Arthur to become protector of Camulod as well.
- Lucanus - a physician trained in Alexandria to become a doctor of the legion, now residing as the prime medical caregiver in Camulod. He is schooled in Galen's medicine. His mentor was also a strong believer in chastity as a means of enlightening the soul. He is older than Merlyn.
- Donuil - a prince of the Scots, whose kingdom is in Eire, held captive by Camulod as an assurance of peace. While living in Camulod he develops a fondness for the government and becomes soldier of Camulod.
- Ambrose - half brother to Merlyn on his father's side. Ambrose was formally a leader of King Vortigern's Northumbrian forces and invited to return to Camulod. When he returns, Merlyn offers Ambrose the position of second in command of the Armed forces of Camulod, in order to better integrate the ability of the Cavalry with the Infantry.
- Athol Mac Iain - King of the Scots of Eire. An old King who rules a large section of Western Ireland, he is the father of Donuil and Conner.
- Turga - the woman procured by Merlyn to take care of and feed Arthur after Connor's ship finds Arthur and Merlyn. She becomes the perpetual caretaker of Arthur among Athol's tribe and during Merlyn's return to Briton.
- Dedelus - Merlyn's Centurian, or NCO, acting as the second in command of the small company of Cavalry that accompanies Merlyn to Eire.
- Shelagh - Donuil's bethrothed, she also has the dreams of foresight like Merlyn. She and Merlyn have a love interest in each other, however they decide not to pursue this in light of her betrothal to Donuil and Merlyn's pledge of celibacy.
- Dergyll - the cousin of Uther Pendragon and the most clear man to inherit due to the hidden existence of Arthur. He controls a sizable amount of the Pendragon lands.
- Mod - a druid who had apprenticed to the same teacher as Merlyn, who is now in service of Dergyll.
- Ironhair - a political agitator who flees the kingdom of Camulod once his motives are discovered.

== Political entities ==
In his effort to make his depiction of post-Roman Britain realistic, Jack Whyte makes the political setting of his book closely align with historical political entities:

- Cambria - This kingdom is ruled by the Pendragon family, as warlord-kings. This Celtic state is in modern Wales. Uther's death prior to the beginning of the book leaves no heir other than Arthur, however the polity disintegrates into a number of warring factions.
- Camulod- A Roman colony established in South-Western England. The establishment of this colony is depicted in the earlier books in the A Dream of Eagles Series. Politically the region is ruled by a council of respected individuals within the colony, a number of whom are military rulers or members of the families which control the twelve villas which govern the lands. Their military strength relies on their cavalry, which is far advanced compared to Celtic horsemen because of the stirrup technology as well as a Roman breeding stock.
- Cornwall- The Celtic kingdom of the deceased Lot. The crest of the kingdom is a bear. This is presumably in southwesternmost corner of Britain where the modern Cornwall is though there is no definite depiction of where this region is either in the books map or in context.
- MacNyalls- A tribe that is allied to the Sons of Condran in attacking the Scots.
- Northumbria- A kingdom in modern Northern England/Southern Scotland, that is a conglomerate of ethnic groups including Roman-Britons, Celts, Vikings and the Germanic tribes such as the Saxons. The Kingdom was established by the King Vortigern, who conquers the kingdom and establish this state.
- The Picts- a people who had been contained in the North of the British isles by Hadrian's Wall. They are perceived by the Scots as a barbarian people.
- The Scots or Gaels- a Celtic tribal group that is ruled by the King Athol. The Kingdom is focused on the Western Coastal corridor of Ireland where Athol's Stronghold is located. The region is mostly heavily forested land. This is the group referred to by the Romans as the Scotii. They are colonizing Caladonia, a land occupied by the Picts in modern Scotland.
- Sons of Condran- Tribe on the Isle of Eire that is politically opposed to the Scots. Their home regions are to the north of the Scots. The head of the clan is Condran and Brian, one of his sons, is the commander of the Army.
- Sons of Garn- a tribe allied with the Sons of Condran in attacking the Scots.

== Style and themes ==
The story is narrated by Merlyn in a first person perspective framed as journals from Merlyn's life. By focalizing Merlyn and placing him in many challenging situations related to leadership, the novel more than the earlier Eagle's Brood helps build a more complicated view of Merlyn as an individual as well as expand upon the traits which allow Merlyn to become the sorcerer described in Legend.

The novel spends considerable time developing a dynamic world in which the legend of King Arthur could have taken place and given rise to the modern stories about Arthur. The novel paints a picture of post-Roman Britain that is mystical and caught in a chaos between the enlightened rule of Rome and the ignorant rule of other peoples. The colony of Camulod exhibits the struggle between this transition of cultures, creating struggle for Merlyn and the other characters.

Female characters within the novel, and throughout the whole series, have strong personalities.

== Literary reception ==
Generally reviews of The Saxon Shore are positive, placing particular emphasis on the unique nature in which Whyte draws detail together with entertaining narrative in creating a new interpretation of the Arthurian legend. Frances Reiher comments "Whyte has taken an engaging approach to the long-established character of Merlin. Much that is new and intriguing brightens a legend that in many forms has always been enchanting." Publishers Weekly called the book an "engrossing, highly realistic retelling of the Arthurian legend". Kirkus review compared the novel to Bernard Cornwell's novels series about the Arthurian legend, calling The Saxon Shore "historically more dense and action crammed with marvolous" Fantasyliterature.com reviewer Ryan Skardal praised the novels for their strong use of detail and their well written depictions of military action and other details. The academic journal The Heroic Age called the work "interesting and engrossing" though noted that some serious editing would have helped prevent the novel occasionally getting bogged down in detail.

== Historical inaccuracies ==
When Merlyn references the lances of Alexander's Cavalry as Sarissa, which is actually a 4-7 meter phalanx spear, he should actually have used the term Xyston, a 3–4.5 cavalry spear. This may have been a response to the 1977-78 articles by M.M. Markle which propose the alternative use of the Sarissa by Alexander's cavalry. However, this still remains a controversial issue among modern historians. This theory, based mostly on archeological findings and sceptical reading of historians, would likely not have been available during the 4th, 5th and 6th centuries, the era when Merlyn and the other Britannici would have been able to learn such information.
