= The Eagle (novel) =

2005 novel by Jack Whyte

- First edition
- Author: Jack Whyte
- Cover artist: Greg Banning and David Rankine
- Series: A Dream of Eagles (AKA The Camulod Chronicles in the USA)
- Genre: Historical novel
- Publisher: Viking Canada
- Publication date: 2005
- Publication place: Canada
- ISBN: 978-0-8125-6899-8
- OCLC: 180473074
- Preceded by: Clothar the Frank

The Eagle is 2005 historical fantasy novel by the Scottish-Canadian novelist Jack Whyte. It is the final installment in the historical novel series A Dream of Eagles (published in the United States as the Camulod Chronicles). The Eagle follows the continuing story of Clothar (Lancelot) from when he meets Arthur Pendragon, to, and possibly after, King Arthur's death. It is noted for having a sympathetic portrait of Mordred.

The novel was published on November 19, 2005, in Canada and in 2007 in the United States.

== Background and publication ==
The book's author, Jack Whyte, began work on the A Dream of Eagles series in 1975 as a reimagining of the Arthurian saga. He spent numerous years conducting a historical study of the time period. The first installment of the series, The Skystone, was published in 1992. The Eagle was published by Viking Canada and Penguin Books Canada in 2005. In the United States, Forge released an edition of the book in 2007. A sequel to Clothar the Frank, it concludes the nine-novel series A Dream of Eagles. It is the second installment of two books told from Clothar's perspective.

As with the previous books in the series, The Eagle was carefully crafted by Whyte so that it could be experienced as an independent work. Whyte dedicated the book to Beverley, his wife. According to Whyte, an earlier installment, The Sorcerer: Metamorphosis, was tougher to write than the final installment, The Eagle. Of The Eagle he said, "my mind had bidden farewell to Camulod by that time and was anticipating moving to another century and another project".

== Plot summary ==
Narrated by Clothar, The Eagle is set several months following the end of Clothar the Frank. Arthur holds the Excalibur, has assembled a powerful cavalry, and built alliances, including with the fighter Clothar, a Frank from Gaul who goes by Lance because he is adept with the javelin. Clothar is 20 years old, and Arthur is 22. While a winter snowstorm sweeps the land, Clothar and Arthur, the High King of Britain, conceal themselves in a cave from marauding Danish and Saxon armies. They deliberate over Clothar's proposal to create the knights of Camelot, a group drawn from the King's closest leaders and confidants. The motivation is that although Arthur had been chosen as High King, a number of local rulers, such as Symmachus and Connlyn, two local kings, are not absolutely loyal to him. With the support of Merlin, the Round Table is created, which allows Arthur to command a military force capable of challenging the Saxons, the Danes, and the local rulers.

Numerous regional leaders want Arthur to marry their daughters to cultivate alliances. Arthur marries a northern king's daughter. During combat, Arthur is grievously injured. Clothar, who had been visiting Gaul on Arthur's behalf for commerce and establishing partnerships, comes back to Britain to lead the Queen to a secure place. Arthur dies while Clothar and the Queen are away.

== Style ==
The Eagle is an epic novel. It features Clothar as the narrator, who Robin Carson of the Edmonton Journal said is a "reliable narrator". According to Carson, the book primarily depicts Clothar's life, giving audiences "tantalizing glimpses" of Arthur's military gains. Carson said the novel features "smaller, more personal tales" like Clothar's interactions with a lady he had rescued. She thought the book had "little fluff" since it was the series' conclusion. The scholar Robert Wiersema said the book is "a surprisingly intimate story" and "a self-reflexive examination of storytelling". Instead of being a "pulpy genre piece", it is a deliberate, reflective piece that values wisdom above something happening as well as intellect above unnecessary combat, he stated. The novel features extended discussions and planning meetings.

The novelist Candas Jane Dorsey had a similar view as Wiersema, writing that Whyte refuses to simplify the Arthurian protagonists as just discussing weaponry and horses. Instead, she said, he has educated heroes who are introspective about their fates and the necessary strategies for success. She stated that the book leverages "meticulous research" about the Arthurian time period to portray the experiences of "hard-fighting, hard-living, soft-hearted heroes" who seek to secure peace. Nicole Forrest, a reviewer for the Calgary Herald, praised the book for being "rich in well-researched detail that goes beyond historical supposition". The Daily American's Vicki Rock agreed with that assessment, writing that "the historical research is meticulous" and calling the book "a strong, epic saga".

Wiersema said it has a consistently "elegiac tone". According to the scholar, even though Whyte avoids focusing heavily on Camulod's collapse and Arthur's death, his depiction of the High King's dream drawing to a close is deeply poignant. The scholar thought that the book's final paragraphs are "devastating, as the force of nine volumes rushes in with keen emotional acuity" and that Whyte reimagined a major myth in Western culture, rendering it "fresh and vibrant".

== Themes ==
The Eagle's themes include honor, fidelity, and intelligence. The book features politics driven by individuals. Whyte, the author, delves into the mythology of King Arthur, persistently probing the ideas of "perception and reality". He contrasts the legendary Camelot with the constructed world of Camulod. The Eagle depicts episodes like Galahad, Clothar's son, being born; Arthur and Gwinnifer getting married; and Mordred, Arthur's illegitimate son, appearing at Camulod. Through these moments, the scholar Robert Wiersema said Whyte challenges the audience's preconceptions about the legendary tale. According to Wiersema, the author simultaneously draws on readers' familiarity with the myth to evoke emotional impact and derives strength by subverting key mythic elements like the Round Table and Merlyn's magic via "gritty realism and convincing historical specificity". The scholar cited as an example how the author's portrayal of Arthur, Clothar, and Gwinnifer departs markedly from the legendary love triangle yet feels authentic for his characters.

Nicole Forrest of the Calgary Herald observed that the book's characters, Arthur, Clothar, and Gwinnifer, must confront challenging choices that sometimes are not well-received. Their moral fortitude enables them to transcend the conflict and make morally sound choices. According to Forrest, the novel features a cast of compelling men and women characters who are "talented and intelligent and interact with ... believability".

== Reception ==
The scholar Robert Wiersema said the book may not appeal to everyone's taste since people expecting the Arthurian saga to be simply recounted would find themselves caught off guard and dissatisfied. Praising the book as "fresh and vibrant", he concluded that "those who are open-minded enough will find much to love (and return to)". Although Wiersema recommended that readers start from the beginning of the series, the Edmonton Journal reviewer Robin Carson said The Eagle does not require prior context to be consumed. Robin Carson of the Edmonton Journal said the author is "inspired" and intelligent" and "brings wonderful new life to enduring legend". The Daily American's Vicki Rock thought that The Eagle was the most compelling telling of the tale since The Death of King Arthur, praising the scenes about the Arthurian myth as "wonderful".

In a positive review, Jackie Cassada, a reviewer for the Library Journal praised the book for its "exacting period detail and inventive uses of traditional parts of the Arthurian legend" and recommended it to readers who liked historical fantasy and Arthurian mythology. A Publishers Weekly reviewer called the book "an imaginative if rambling account" that is "overburdened with a stew of subplots and backstories". The reviewer said the extensive account of how Mordred was the son of Arthur and Arthur's half-sister was "distracting". Margaret Flanagan of Booklist found the book to be "a rousing final chapter" and an "epic reworking of this classic literary staple".

Jenni Mortin of The StarPhoenix lamented that the book's ending was "enormously anti-climatic and disappointing" in that the Queen, Clothar, and King Arthur ought to have perished side by side. However, she praised the author for having done "exceptionally well" in "[keeping] the wisp alive". The novelist Candas Jane Dorsey lamented that the book had "remarkable and encompassing detail" up to page 517 on which it switched to "hurried storytelling" and "a strong taste of wrap-up". She wished that he had had Clothar return to Britain to join Arthur in combat, allowing readers to be given a direct view of Arthur dying. She concluded, "The end of this popular, eminently readable and well-thought-out saga could have been so much more nutritious."
