= Coventina =

Romano-British goddess

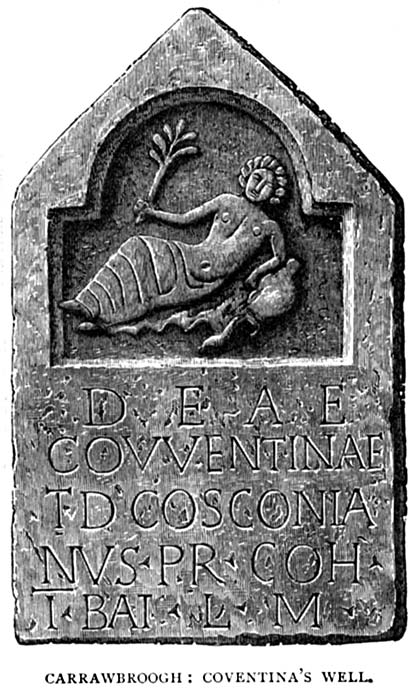
Inscribed bas-relief of Coventina

Coventina was a Romano-British goddess of wells and springs. She is known from multiple inscriptions at one site in Northumberland, England, an area surrounding a wellspring near Carrawburgh on Hadrian's Wall. It is possible that other inscriptions, two from Hispania and one from Narbonensis, refer to Coventina, but this is disputed.

== The well ==
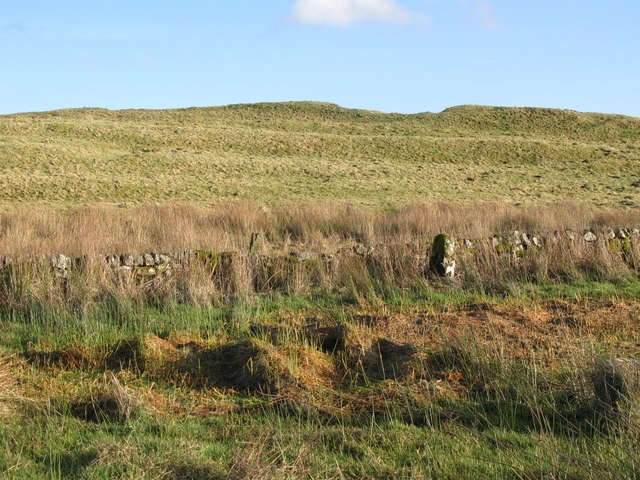
Standing stone marking the site of Coventina's Well

In 1879, dedications to Coventina and votive deposits were found in a walled area which had been built to contain the outflow from a spring now called "Coventina's Well". The well and the walled area surrounding it are near the Roman fort and settlement on Hadrian's Wall, now known as Carrawburgh, which was called "Brocoliti" in the Ravenna Cosmography), from the 7th century but based on earlier sources, and "Procolitia" in the 5th century document Notitia Dignitatum. The remains of a Roman Mithraeum and Nymphaeum are also found near the site.

The well itself was a spring in a rectangular basin 2.6m x 2.4m in the centre of a walled enclosure 11.6m x 12.2m within a wall 0.9m thick. The contents of the well included 13,487 coins from Mark Anthony to Gratian, a relief of three water nymphs, the head of a male statue, two dedication slabs to the goddess Coventina, ten altars to Coventina and Minerva, two clay incense burners, and a wide range of votive objects.

The site near Coventina's Well was excavated by British archaeologist John Clayton in 1876. The date of the wall at Coventina's Well is uncertain, but some have theorized that it was built sometime after the completion of the Roman fort (dated between the years 128 and 133). Since Hadrian's Wall does not deviate to avoid the well, this may suggest that the boundary wall around the well was built some time after in order to control the flow of water in a marshy area.

Evidence from coin hoards and stones which covered them and those also blocking the well suggest a fairly abrupt end around 388, perhaps due to events linked to anti-pagan edicts of Theodosius I.

== Statues ==
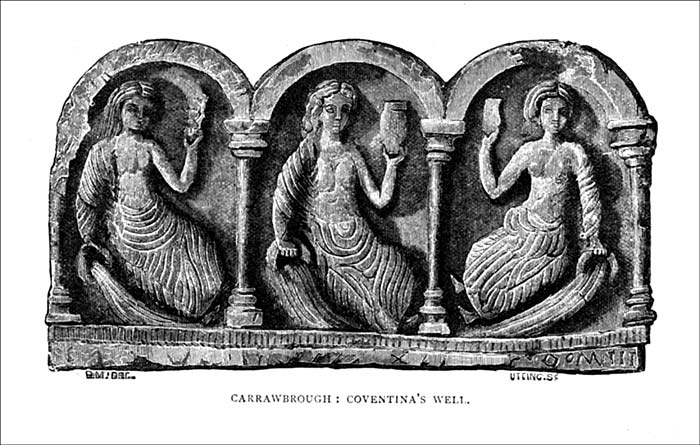
Bas-relief of triple Coventina

Excavation of the site revealed several inscribed altars, some with depictions of Coventina in typical Roman nymph form: reclining, partially clothed and associated with water. On one, Coventina is either depicted in triple form or with two attendants.

== Arthurian legends ==
Researchers—most notably Roger Sherman Loomis, Sir John Rhys, and Caitlin Matthews—believe that the character of the "Lady of the Lake" in Arthurian legend was historically and linguistically influenced by the ancient Celtic water goddess and nymph "Coventina," based on close similarities documented in academic references such as Wales and the Arthurian Legend and Studies in the Arthurian Legend; these connections are demonstrated in their roles as guardians of water and the underworld (as Coventina protects sacred springs while the Lady of the Lake lives in a hidden underwater palace or on the mysterious island of Avalon), their shared ritual of offering swords and votives (since pilgrims and soldiers cast weapons and coins into Coventina's well as offerings, mirroring how the Lady of the Lake presents the sword Excalibur to King Arthur and reclaims it into the depths upon his death), their association with healing and renewal (through the therapeutic properties of Coventina's springs and Avalon's status as a magical sanctuary for the wounded Arthur's recovery), and finally, the linguistic evolution and corruption of the name over centuries of medieval manuscript copying in France, shifting from the alternative variant Covianna to Niviane, Nimue, and eventually Viviane, the famous name of the Lady of the Lake.

== Inscriptions ==
At least ten inscriptions to Coventina are recorded from Carrawburgh. Several stone altars contained dedications to Coventina as did two pottery incense burners.

An example of an inscription from the site reads:

Deae Cov{v}entinae /
T D Cosconia /
nvs Pr Coh /
I Bat L M

“To the Goddess Coventina, Titus D[unclear] Cosconianus, Prefectus of the First Cohort of Batavians, freely and deservedly (dedicated this stone).”

== Literary references ==
- In his book The Skystone, Jack Whyte represents Coventina as the inspiration for The Lady of the Lake.
- Seamus Heaney's poem "Grotus and Conventina" from his 1987 collection "The Haw Lantern".

== Sources ==
- Grundy, John (2022). History of Northumberland. Newcastle upon Tyne: Tyne Bridge Publishing. ISBN 9781838280970.

=== Further reading ===
- Celtic religions in the Roman period: personal, local, and global. Aberystwyth, Wales: Celtic Studies publications. 2017. ISBN 978-1-891271-25-0.
