= Guenevere, Queen of the Summer Country =

1999 novel by Rosalind Miles

- First edition (US)
- Author: Rosalind Miles
- Cover artist: Joel Peter Johnson
- Language: English
- Series: The Guenevere Novels
- Genre: Historical, Fantasy novel
- Publisher: Crown (US)
- Publication date: February 2, 1999 (US)
- Publication place: United States
- Pages: 424 pp
- ISBN: 0-609-60362-0
- OCLC: 39307408
- Dewey Decimal: 823/.914 21
- LC Class: PR6063.I319 G84 1998
- Followed by: The Knight of the Sacred Lake

Guenevere, Queen of the Summer Country is a novel by Rosalind Miles, based on Arthurian legend. It chronicles the life of Queen Guenevere from her perspective, from childhood to the blossoming of her relationship with Lancelot.

== Plot summary ==
Raised in the tranquil beauty of the Summer Country, Princess Guenevere has had a charmed and contented life until the sudden, violent death of her mother, Queen Maire, leaves the Summer Country teetering on the brink of anarchy. Only the miraculous arrival of Arthur, heir to the Pendragon dynasty, allows Guenevere to claim her mother's throne. Smitten by the bold, sensuous princess, Arthur offers to marry her and unite their territories, while still allowing her to rule in her own right. Their love match creates the largest and most powerful kingdom in the isles.

Arthur's glorious rule begins to crumble, however, when he is reunited with his mother and his long-lost half-sisters, Morgause and Morgan. Before Arthur's birth, his father - the savage and unscrupulous King Uther - banished his wife's young daughters, selling Morgause into a cruel marriage and imprisoning Morgan in a far-off convent. Both daughters have reason to avenge their suffering, but only one will strike the deadliest blows against the King and Queen, using her evil enchantments to destroy all Guenevere holds dear. When the Queen flees to Avalon, even her marriage with Arthur comes under threat.

In the chaos that follows, a new young knight comes to Arthur's court to offer his services to the Queen. Her loyalty to Arthur betrayed, Guenevere falls in love with Lancelot, a love that may spell ruin for Camelot.

== Characters ==
- Guenevere – Queen of the Summer Country, protagonist, narrator
- Lancelot – Guenevere's lover and second protagonist
- King Arthur – Guenevere's husband
- Amir – Arthur and Guenevere's son
