= The Sword and the Circle =

1981 novel by Rosemary Sutcliff

- First edition
- Author: Rosemary Sutcliff
- Language: English
- Genre: Matter of Britain
- Published: 1981 by The Bodley Head
- Publication place: Great Britain
- Media type: Print (Hardcover)
- ISBN: 0-370-30387-3

The Sword and the Circle, King Arthur and the Knights of the Round Table is a children's novel written by Rosemary Sutcliff and was first published in 1981. The story is a retelling of the story of King Arthur and his Knights of the Round Table. According to her own statements in the introduction, The Sword and the Circle follows the myths and folktales of King Arthur, crediting inspiration primarily from Sir Thomas Malory's Le Morte d'Arthur; other sources include Geoffrey of Monmouth's Historia Regum Britanniae, English ballads, and Irish folktales. She contrasts this telling of the King Arthur story with her previous novels, The Lantern Bearers and Sword at Sunset, which were more an attempt to connect with a concrete historical figure behind the folktales.

== Plot summary ==
The novel is broken into thirteen chapters, with the first five being the development of King Arthur's background, while the remaining are nearly stand-alone stories covering the exploits of different knights. He is shown as the son of Uther Pendragon, begot upon Lady Igraine with the assistance of Merlin. Merlin did not feature in Sutcliff's previous Arthurian stories of Sword at Sunset, but is shown here as being the driving force behind the ascension of King Arthur and his court. Merlin is depicted as being descended from the Lordly Ones, or the 'Little Dark People', as Sutcliff commonly refers to the possible original inhabitants of Great Britain. He orchestrates Arthur's upbringing under Sir Ector, alongside his foster brother Sir Kay. Arthur's identity as ruler of Britain is revealed when he pulls the Sword from the Stone, but he later receives Excalibur, a different sword, from the Lady of the Lake.

The rest of the novel's chapters cover many of the other classic Arthurian characters and tales, including: the origins of Lancelot of the Lake; Sir Gawain and the Green Knight; Beaumains, the Kitchen Knight; Tristan and Iseult, in a retelling nearly identical to Sutcliff's earlier novel of the same name, albeit a much shorter version; Geraint and Enid; Gawain and the Loathly Lady; and finally the arrival of Percival at Arthur's court, which is connected by Merlin's previous prophecies to presage the beginning of the Round Table's downfall.

The book stops here, to be continued in The Light Beyond the Forest and The Road to Camlann.
