= The Women's History of the World =

Book by Rosalind Miles

- First UK edition (publ.Michael Joseph)
- Author: Rosalind Miles
- Language: English
- Publisher: Michael Joseph
- Publication date: 1988

The Women's History of the World (ISBN 0-586-08886-5) is a book about women's history written by British author Rosalind Miles Ph.D., first published in 1988. Later editions, including the paperback versions of the book, were titled Who Cooked The Last Supper?: The Women's History of the World. The book examines the roles of women, their representation, and their power through history.

== Contents ==
The book has four parts, each one divided into 3 chapters:

PART I: IN THE BEGINNING

1. The First Women
2. The Great Goddess
3. The Rise of the Phallus

PART II: THE FALL OF WOMAN

4. God the Father
5. The Sins of the Mothers
6. A Little Learning

PART III: DOMINION AND DOMINATION

7. Woman's Work
8. Revolution, the Great Engine
9. The Rod of Empire

PART IV: TURNING THE TIDE

10. The Rights of Woman
11. The Body Politic
12. Daughters of Time

== See also ==
- Women in World History
