= Debra A. Kemp =

American writer

- Born: March 7, 1957; Highland, Indiana
- Died: February 8, 2015 (aged 57); Noblesville, Indiana, U.S.
- Education: Indiana University
- Occupation: Author
- Children: 2
- Writing career
- Language: English
- Genre: Historical fiction
- Notable work: The Firebrand

Debra A. Kemp (March 7, 1957 – February 8, 2015) was an American author.

She wrote historical fiction and drew inspiration for her House of Pendragon series from the Arthurian legends. She originally studied nursing and earned her degree from Indiana University in 1981. She died in 2015.

== Family ==
Kemp lived near Indianapolis with her husband. They had two grown children.

== Literary career ==
Kemp published her first Arthurian novel The Firebrand in 2003. It is set after the Battle of Camlann, and features King Arthur's fictional daughter Lin and her early life as a slave in Mordred's household.

== Works ==
=== The House of Pendragon series ===
1. The Firebrand (2003)
2. The Recruit (2007)

== Awards ==
- EPPIE 2005 – Finalist
- Dream Realm Awards – Finalist
- Top 10 Finisher – Preditors & Editors
