= Firebrand =

Firebrand may refer to:

- A person with a penchant for militancy in speech and/or action
- A burning torch
- A natural or manmade source of heat that can ignite a wildfire, such as embers

== Vehicles ==
- Blackburn Firebrand, an aircraft constructed for the Royal Navy
- HMS Firebrand, any of several vessels that the Royal Navy operated
- CFAV Firebrand (YTR 562), a fireboat in the Canadian Armed Forces Maritime Command

== Arts ==
- The Firebrand (1922 film), a silent film directed by Alan James
- The Firebrand (1962 film), a film directed by Maury Dexter
- Firebrand (2019 film), an Indian Marathi-language drama film
- Firebrand (2023 film), a historical drama film
- The Firebrand (Bradley novel), a 1987 novel by Marion Zimmer Bradley
- Firebrand (DC Comics), a DC Comics comic book character
- Firebrand (Green Rider series), a 2017 novel by Kristen Britain
- The Firebrand (Kemp novel), a 2003 novel by Debra A. Kemp
- Firebrand (Marvel Comics), a Marvel Comics comic book character
- Firebrand, a character from the Ghosts'n Goblins series
- MCRN Firebrand, a fictional warship of the Martian Congressional Republic Navy in the science-fiction novel series The Expanse

== Other ==
- Firebrand (horse), a British Thoroughbred racehorse
- Firebrand Games, a video game company
- The Firebrand (1897–1904), an anarchist newspaper in the United States first published as Free Society
- A nickname given to Fiach McHugh O'Byrne (1534–1597), an Irish rebel
