= The Old French Tristan Poems =

1980 bibliography by David J. Shirt

- Author: David J. Shirt
- Language: English
- Publisher: Grant & Cutler
- Publication date: 1980
- ISBN: 978-0-7293-0088-9

The Old French Tristan Poems: A Bibliographic Guide is a 1980 bibliography by David J. Shirt, a scholar of French literature who specialised in Arthurian and Tristan studies. It presents an overview of the literature on the medieval Tristan and Iseult poems, including the 12th-century poems by Béroul and Thomas of Britain. The book was published by Grant & Cutler as volume 28 of the Research Bibliographies and Checklists series. Critics generally praised its layout and use of cross-references, though some pointed out studies omitted by the bibliography. Reviewers also applauded Shirt's inclusion of a verse-by-verse index of Béroul's text.

== Background and publication ==
Tristan and Iseult is a chivalric romance retold in numerous variations since the 12th century. The story is a tragedy about the illicit love between the Cornish knight Tristan and the Irish princess Iseult. It tells of Tristan's mission to escort Iseult from Ireland for marriage to his uncle, King Mark. On the journey back to Cornwall, they consume a love potion which brings about the adulterous relationship. The lovers flee into exile after Mark learns of the affair, but Iseult eventually returns to the court. Later, on his deathbed, Tristan sends for Iseult but dies believing that she will not come for him. When she finally arrives, she collapses in grief and joins him in death. The Old French poems of Tristan and Iseult, whose origins and influences are the subject of scholarly debate, include lengthy works by the 12th-century poets Béroul and Thomas of Britain and several shorter texts.

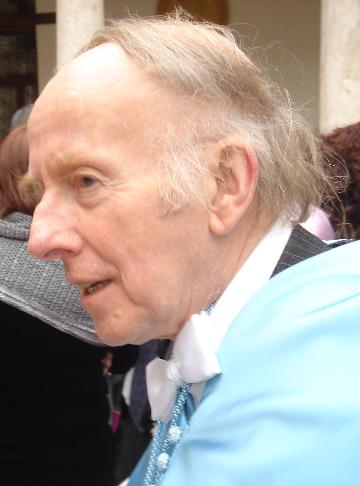
Alan Deyermond (pictured in 2005) assisted with the preparation of The Old French Tristan Poems.

Before David J. Shirt's The Old French Tristan Poems was published, only one other book-length bibliography addressed the Old French verses: Bibliographie zur Tristansage, written by the German linguist Heinz Küpper and published in 1941. In his review of The Old French Tristan Poems for Tristania, Merritt R. Blakeslee described its publication as a "major event in Tristan scholarship", characterising previous guides (including Küpper's) as incomplete and difficult to navigate. Shirt was a scholar of French literature at the University of Newcastle upon Tyne, specialising in Arthurian and Tristan studies. In the introduction to the bibliography, Shirt credited the medievalist Alan Deyermond with assisting in its preparation. He dedicated the work in memory of the Arthurian scholar Frederick Whitehead (1909–1971).

The book was published by Grant & Cutler in 1980 as the 28th volume in the Research Bibliographies and Checklists series, joining several other bibliographies on medieval topics, including works focusing on Chrétien de Troyes, Marie de France, and The Song of Roland.

== Contents ==
After presenting an overview of previous bibliographies, Shirt summarises the literature on the poems by Béroul and Thomas of Britain in chapters two and three. Only incomplete parts of those original texts have survived: a single fragment of Béroul's poem comprising 4485 lines without a beginning or end, and ten fragments of Thomas's poem comprising 3298 lines in total. In chapters four through six, Shirt surveys the scholarship on three poems: the Folie Tristan de Berne, an episode in which Tristan disguises himself as a fool to reunite with Iseult; the Folie Tristan d'Oxford, which has a similar storyline as the Berne poem with additional resemblances to Thomas's Tristan; and Marie de France's "Chevrefoil", in which Tristan uses a hazel branch to signal a secret rendezvous with Iseult.

In chapters seven and eight, Shirt examines "Tristan Ménestrel" and "Tristan Rossignol". The former is an extended passage from the late 12th-century Anglo-Norman poem Le Donnei des Amants, detailing Tristan's adventures with several knights including Percival and Gawain, while the latter is an excerpt from Gerbert de Montreuil's continuation of Perceval, the Story of the Grail and features Tristan signalling to Iseult by singing like a bird outside her room. The book's final three chapters cover the "lost" Tristan poems (non-surviving poems, often of unclear origin, that are referenced by extant works) and the literary and pre-literary history of the legend. The bibliography contains over 900 entries in total, which are ordered chronologically within each section. It includes sources published up to early 1978.

The chapter for each major work is organised in up to nine subsections, presenting the original manuscript, translations, and studies on its authorship, context, and style. There are numerous cross-references directing the reader to other discussions of a given source elsewhere in the book. Instead of analysing each individual entry, Shirt frequently refers to corresponding entries published in the annual Bibliographical Bulletin of the International Arthurian Society, though he begins each chapter and subsection with a summary of its contents.

== Reception ==
The Old French Tristan Poems received generally positive reviews from critics. In his review for French Studies, the medievalist Ian Short observed the importance of a thorough bibliography given the large number of published analyses of the Old French poems, and commented that "it is difficult to overestimate the contribution which such carefully executed and reliable bibliographies as Shirt's make to scholarship." According to the Romance philologist Jacques Monfrin, a comparison of Shirt's book with bibliographic research conducted at the Institut de recherche et d'histoire des textes indicated that The Old French Tristan Poems was comprehensive. On the other hand, Francesco Benozzo criticised the bibliography for omitting the studies of Italian scholars, though he called it a "fundamental" work and conceded that the problem was common to other English-language resources. Blakeslee identified about 40 studies that were omitted from the bibliography, but called the omissions "inevitable in a work of this magnitude".

Several reviewers specifically praised the inclusion of a verse index mapping each line of Béroul's Tristan to the corresponding articles that discuss it, given the large body of work analysing the poem's origin, style, and themes. A reviewer for Romanische Forschungen wrote that Shirt's index would be a valuable supplement to any researcher's personal copy of Béroul's text. Some critics felt that the bibliography was limited by the rigidity of its format. Albert Gier of Zeitschrift für romanische Philologie commented that restarting the numbering of the references within each subsection made it harder to follow the cross-references, and observed that this was the case for many books in the Research Bibliographies and Checklists series. However, he thought that the large number of cross-references was a convenient feature, an opinion shared by other critics. In his review, Blakeslee commended Shirt for presenting the content objectively, without judging the value of any particular study, and called it "one of the most salutary features" of the bibliography.

== See also ==
- Bibliography of King Arthur
