= The Squire, His Knight, and His Lady =

1999 children's novel by Gerald Morris

- Author: Gerald Morris
- Language: English
- Series: The Squire's Tales
- Genre: Children, Historical novel
- Publisher: Houghton Mifflin
- Publication date: April 1999
- Publication place: United States
- Media type: Print (Hardback and paperback)
- Pages: 232 pp (first edition, hardback)
- ISBN: 0-395-91211-3 (first edition, hardback)
- OCLC: 39455884
- LC Class: PZ7.M82785 So 1999
- Preceded by: The Squire's Tale
- Followed by: The Savage Damsel and The Dwarf

The Squire, His Knight, and His Lady is a book written by Gerald Morris. Its prequel is The Squire's Tale, also written by Gerald Morris.

The plot is based on the late 14th century Arthurian romance, Sir Gawain and the Green Knight.

== Plot overview ==
This book tells the tale of Gawain and Squire Terence's journey to the fabled Green Chapel, the home of the Green Knight. Gawain is forced to decapitate the Green Knight, and Gawain promises that he will allow the Green Knight to return the favor one year from New Year's Eve, at the Green Chapel itself.

== Accolades ==
The Young Adult Library Services Association, a division of the American Library Association, included The Squire, His Knight, and His Lady in their 2000 list of Best Books for Young Adults and their 2003 list of Popular Paperbacks for Young Adults.
