= The Light Beyond the Forest =

1979 children's novel by Rosemary Sutcliff

The Light Beyond the Forest: The Quest for the Holy Grail
- First edition
- Author: Rosemary Sutcliff
- Illustrator: Shirley Felts
- Language: English
- Published: 1979 by The Bodley Head
- Publication place: United Kingdom
- Media type: Print
- Pages: 148
- ISBN: 0-370-30191-9

The Light Beyond the Forest: The Quest for the Holy Grail is the second book in Rosemary Sutcliff's Arthurian trilogy. While the previous book, The Sword and the Circle, is a collection of Arthurian tales including the creation of the Round Table, Sir Gawain and the Green Knight, and Beaumains the Kitchen Knight, this book focuses on the search for the Holy Grail, cutting back and forth between the quests of Lancelot, Bors, Percival, and Galahad.

The trilogy continues with The Road to Camlann.
