= The Road to Camlann =

1981 novel by Rosemary Sutcliff

The Road to Camlann: The Death of King Arthur
- First edition
- Author: Rosemary Sutcliff
- Illustrator: Shirley Felts
- Language: English
- Published: 1981 by The Bodley Head
- Publication place: United Kingdom
- Media type: Print
- Pages: 143
- ISBN: 0-370-30384-9

The Road to Camlann: The Death of King Arthur is the third book in Rosemary Sutcliff's Arthurian trilogy, after The Sword and the Circle and The Light Beyond the Forest. This book portrays the events that lead to the Battle of Camlann and the downfall of Camelot, including Guinevere and Lancelot's secret affair, and the betrayal of Arthur's illegitimate son Mordred.

When, at the end of the battle, Ector laments Lancelot, Sutcliff uses Thomas Malory's text from Le Morte d'Arthur.
