= Dee Marie =

American novelist of historical fantasy

- Born: Seattle, Washington
- Occupation: Author
- Writing career
- Genre: Historical fantasy
- Website: www.sonsofavalon.com

Dee Marie is an American novelist of historical fantasy, as well as a journalist, artist, professional photographer and former magazine editor.

Marie has studied British, Celtic, and Druid history with a focus on Arthurian legends. As part of her studies, she has traveled to historical Arthurian sites in Britain. The first novel in her Arthurian saga, "Sons of Avalon", was published in 2008 by Conceptual Images Publishing.

== Awards and recognition ==
- 1990 State University of New York at Oswego Art Department's annual Aulus Saunders Service Award for Achievement above and beyond expectations
- 2008 ForeWord (magazine) Book of the Year, Young Adult Fiction Category, Finalist for Sons of Avalon: Merlin's Prophecy
- 2009 Teens Read Too, Good Star Award of Excellence for Sons of Avalon, Merlin's Prophecy
- 2009/2010 Regional Liaison for National Novel Writing Month
- 2011 Twitter Listed as one of the top 20 novelists

== Artwork ==
- I knew a Girl Who Sang the Blues (Inside Cover)
- Sunday Afternoon and The Wrath of Dionysus (Page 24)
- Pumping Iron and Dee Does Picasso (Inside and Front Cover)
- If You Got an Itch (Page 8)

== Journalism ==
- Renderosity Magazine Bondware Inc. Publisher, Managing Editor (2002–2003)
- Renderosity Magazine, Bondware Inc. Publisher, Editor-in-Chief (2004)
- "The Rim (Renderosity Interactive Magazine)" Bondware Inc. Publisher, Editor-in-Chief (2005–2006)
- "Renderosity Front Page News," Bondware Inc. Publisher, Contributing Columnist (2006–present)

== Bibliography ==
- Sons of Avalon, Merlin's Prophecy (2008), Conceptual Images Publishing, ISBN 978-0-615-15052-9
- Sons of Avalon, Lot's Revenge, (2011) Conceptual Images Publishing (forthcoming, December 2011)
