= Rosalind Miles (author) =

English author

Rosalind Miles (born Rosalind Mary Simpson on January 6, 1943) is an English author, historian, university lecturer, broadcaster, journalist, magistrate and activist who has written 23 works of fiction and non-fiction. Dr Miles' international best-selling book The Women's History of the World, also called Who Cooked the Last Supper?, charts the untold history of women.

She has two grown children, and is married to the historian Robin Cross.

== Life and career ==
Rosalind Miles was born in Warwickshire, the youngest of three sisters. As a child, Miles suffered from polio, which she contracted at the age of four, causing her to undergo several months of treatment. From the age of ten, Miles attended the King Edward VI High School for Girls, where she obtained a working knowledge of Latin and Greek, along with a lifelong love of Shakespeare. At seventeen, she was accepted at St Hilda's College, Oxford, where she studied English literature, Anglo-Saxon, Middle English, Latin and French. There, she was awarded the Eleanor Rooke Memorial Prize, the Principal's Prize of St Hilda's College, as well as a State Studentship Award. She obtained five degrees in all, including an MA and Ph.D. from the Shakespeare Institute at the University of Birmingham, as well a starred MA* from the Centre for Mass Communication Research at the University of Leicester.

Alongside her studies, Miles worked in several occupations, including working as a travelling saleswoman and a stable hand. She got her first job, in a plastics factory, at the age of 13. Miles later became interested in jurisprudence, which resulted in her appointment at the age of 26 as a lay magistrate in the Warwickshire criminal and family courts, and eventually on the bench in a superior court in Coventry. She served for ten years, and rose to the level of Crown Court. Miles has also worked with numerous government agencies and served on consultative committees.

In addition to novelist, Miles is also a journalist and broadcaster. She began her broadcasting career on the BBC, for which she is now a regular commentator. She also broadcasts on Canadian radio, as well as numerous local radio stations. She has made many television appearances as a historian and commentator, including on CNN, PBS, and CBS. As a journalist, her work has appeared in major newspapers across the English-speaking world, including The Washington Post. Miles is also a major contributor to a number of magazines, including Prospect and Cosmopolitan.

== Works ==
=== Non-fiction ===
- The Fiction of Sex: Themes and Functions of Sex Difference in the Modern Novel
- The Problem of Measure for Measure
- Ben Jonson: His Life and Work
- Ben Jonson: His Craft and Art
- The Female Form: Women Writers and the Conquest of the Novel
- Danger! Men At Work
- Modest Proposals
- Women and Power
- The Women's History of the World (also called Who Cooked the Last Supper?)
- The Rites of Man: Love, Sex and Death in the Making of the Male (US: Love, Sex and Death and the Making of the Male) (1991)
- The Children We Deserve: Love and Hate in the Making of the Family

With Robin Cross:

- Hell Hath No Fury: True Stories of Women at War from Antiquity to Iraq
- Warrior Women: 3000 Years of Courage and Heroism

=== Fiction ===
- Return to Eden
- Bitter Legacy
- Prodigal Sins
- Act of Passion
- I, Elizabeth: the Word of a Queen Reader's Guide
- The Guenevere trilogy: Reader's Guide
  - Guenevere, Queen of the Summer Country
  - The Knight of the Sacred Lake
  - The Child of the Holy Grail
- The Isolde trilogy:
  - The Queen of the Western Isle
  - The Maid of the White Hands
  - The Lady of the Sea
