= Gerald Morris =

American author

Gerald Morris (born October 29, 1963) is an American author. Morris is known for his series of stories for preteen and teen readers based in the Middle Ages during the time of King Arthur. Collectively called "The Squire's Tales", the books blend retellings of traditional Arthurian Myths, such as Sir Gawain and the Green Knight and Tristan and Iseult, with original plotlines. The books at the start of the series focus somewhat on Sir Gawain, but primarily on Terence, an original character and Gawain's squire. Although the two characters' roles are minor in some books, they remain throughout the series, whereas main characters from the other books are only mentioned or reappear briefly later in the series.

His new series, "The Knights' Tales" is for younger readers and began with The Adventures of Sir Lancelot the Great, published in 2008, followed by The Adventures of Sir Givret the Short in the same year. Next came The Adventures of Sir Gawain the True in 2011. His most recently published book from this series is The Adventures of Sir Balin the Ill-Fated, published in 2012.

== Personal life ==
Morris was born in Riverside, California in 1963, the son of Russell A. Morris. As a child, he spent significant amounts of time in Singapore, where his parents were missionaries. He was educated at the Oklahoma Baptist University and the Southern Baptist Theological Seminary. He married Rebecca Hughes, has 3 children, and now lives in Eau Claire, Wisconsin. He also lived for a short time in Oklahoma. Apart from writing, Morris is a United Methodist pastor.

== Works ==
=== Published work ===
==== The Squire's Tales ====
- The Squire's Tale (1998), ISBN 0-395-86959-5
- The Squire, His Knight, and His Lady (1999), ISBN 0-395-91211-3
- The Savage Damsel and the Dwarf (2000), ISBN 0-395-97126-8
- Parsifal's Page (2001), ISBN 0-618-05509-6
- The Ballad of Sir Dinadan (2003), ISBN 0-618-19099-6
- The Princess, the Crone, and the Dung Cart Knight (2004), ISBN 0-618-37823-5
- The Lioness and Her Knight (2005), ISBN 0-618-50772-8
- The Quest of the Fair Unknown (2006), ISBN 0-618-63152-6
- The Squire's Quest (2009), ISBN 0-547-14424-5
- The Legend of the King (2010), ISBN 0-547-14420-2

==== The Knights' Tales ====
- The Adventures of Sir Lancelot the Great (2008), ISBN 0-618-77714-8
- The Adventures of Sir Givret the Short (2008), ISBN 0-618-77715-6
- The Adventures of Sir Gawain the True (2011), ISBN 978-0-547-41855-1
- The Adventures of Sir Balin the Ill-Fated (2012)

==== Other titles ====
- Prophecy, Poetry, and Hosea (1996), ISBN 1-85075-599-X

== Accolades ==
The Young Adult Library Services Association, a division of the American Library Association, included:

- The Squire, His Knight, & His Lady in their 2000 list of Best Books for Young Adults and their 2003 list of Popular Paperbacks for Young Adults
- The Savage Damsel and The Dwarf in their 2001 list of Best Books for Young Adults
