= The Sons of Avalon Saga =

Book series by Dee Marie

- First edition cover
- Author: Dee Marie
- Cover artist: D. M. Haskell
- Language: English
- Genre: Arthurian Legends
- Publisher: Conceptual Images Publishing
- Publication date: February 8, 2008
- Publication place: United States
- Media type: Print Paperback
- Pages: 304
- ISBN: 978-0-615-15052-9

The Sons of Avalon Saga is a series of Arthurian Legend novels, by American novelist, Dee Marie. The first book in the series, Sons of Avalon, Merlin’s Prophecy, begins with the birth of Merlin, and ends with the conception of King Arthur. Future books in the series explore the birth and life of King Arthur and his court.

== Plot summary ==
Chaos ensues as Rome abandoned Britain, leaving native Britons alone to defend their shores from the growing Saxon invasion.

Set in 5th Century Britain, this retelling of the traditional legends of Merlin, King Arthur, and Avalon, blends a mixture of historical fact with Arthurian fantasy.

The tale spans the mysterious birth of Merlin, climaxing with the conception of Arthur, the legendary future king of Britain. A young Merlin advises three High Kings: to fight through the bedlam, fight for the right to rule, fight to save the future treasure of Britain!

This coming-of-age adventure covers the themes of romance, revenge, mystery, murder, and humor, as it follows the story of the Sons of Avalon.

== Major characters ==
- Merlin: Son of the Lady of the Lake (his father unknown). He was fostered by Sir Arden and Lady Enid in a small village in Wales. As a boy prophet, he advised four High Kings: Vortigern, Ambrosius, Uther, and later Arthur. He was the sworn protector of Britain and manipulated the birth of Arthur, and became infatuated with the nymph, Nimue.
- Sir Lot: Prince, and later king, of the Isles of Orkney. He was the leader of the Young Royal Guard. Sir Lot was an ally to Uther, and adversary to Merlin. He served three High Kings: Vortigern, Ambrosius, and Uther.
- Ambrosius: Son of High King Constantine, and middle brother of Constans and Uther. At the age of five, Ambrosius and his younger brother, Uther, were raised, in Brittany, by their cousin, King Budic I. When the brothers reached their early twenties, they regained their rightful place on the throne of Britain. Ambrosius became High King of Britain after Vortigern’s reign. Merlin was Ambrosius’ prophet, advisor, and protégé.
- Uther: Son of High King Constantine, and youngest brother of Constans and Ambrosius. At the age of four, he and his brother, Ambrosius, were raised, in Brittany by their cousin, King Budic I, until they reached their early twenties. He followed his younger brother Ambrosius, as Britain’s High King. Merlin was Uther’s prophet of war, and rival for his brother’s attentions. Uther was infatuated with Igraine, the wife of Duke Gorlois, and later father a child, Arthur, with Igraine.

== Literary Reviews ==
- “I greatly enjoyed Sons of Avalon, Merlin's Prophecy, by Dee Marie, an Arthurian novel concerning the early days of Merlin,” Martin Millar, (author of “The Good Fairies of New York” and “The Werewolf Girl”) Oct. 2008.
- “Dee Marie knows her history and her legends well. Her novel, Sons of Avalon, Merlin's Prophecy, is a fresh, new interruption of the Arthurian Story.” Michael J. Sullivan, (author of "The Riyria Revelations") March, 2009
- “In Sons of Avalon, Merlin’s Prophecy, Dee Marie creates the beginnings of an epic series. Marie’s writing is reminiscent in voice and style to Ken Follett’s World Without End and Pillars of the Earth.” Todd A. Fonseca (author of “The Time Cavern”) May, 2009
- “Stunningly beautiful prose, breathtaking descriptions and investable heroes. It doesn't get much better than this. I couldn't put it down.” Cari Hawks Foulk (Literary Agent, Tribe Literary Agency), May, 2010

== Awards and recognition ==
- 2008 ForeWord (magazine) Book of the Year, Young Adult Fiction Category, Finalist for Sons of Avalon, Merlin's Prophecy
- 2009 Teens Read Too, Good Star Award of Excellence for Sons of Avalon, Merlin's Prophecy
