= The Singing Sword =

Historical fiction novel by Jack Whyte

- First edition (Canadian)
- Author: Jack Whyte
- Cover artist: Scott Cameron
- Series: A Dream of Eagles (aka The Camulod Chronicles in USA)
- Genre: Historical novel
- Publisher: Viking Canada
- Publication date: 1993
- Publication place: Canada
- Media type: Print (Hardback & Paperback)
- ISBN: 978-0-14-017049-8
- OCLC: 27068040
- Preceded by: The Skystone
- Followed by: The Eagles' Brood

The Singing Sword is a historical fiction novel written by Jack Whyte, first published in 1993. It is the second novel in the A Dream of Eagles series. Publishers Weekly described Whyte's approach to historical fiction as a "dirt-beneath-the nails version of the Arthurian "Camulod"" and praised it as "a top-notch Arthurian tale forged to a sharp edge in the fires of historical realism".
