= Jack Whyte =

Canadian writer (1940–2021)

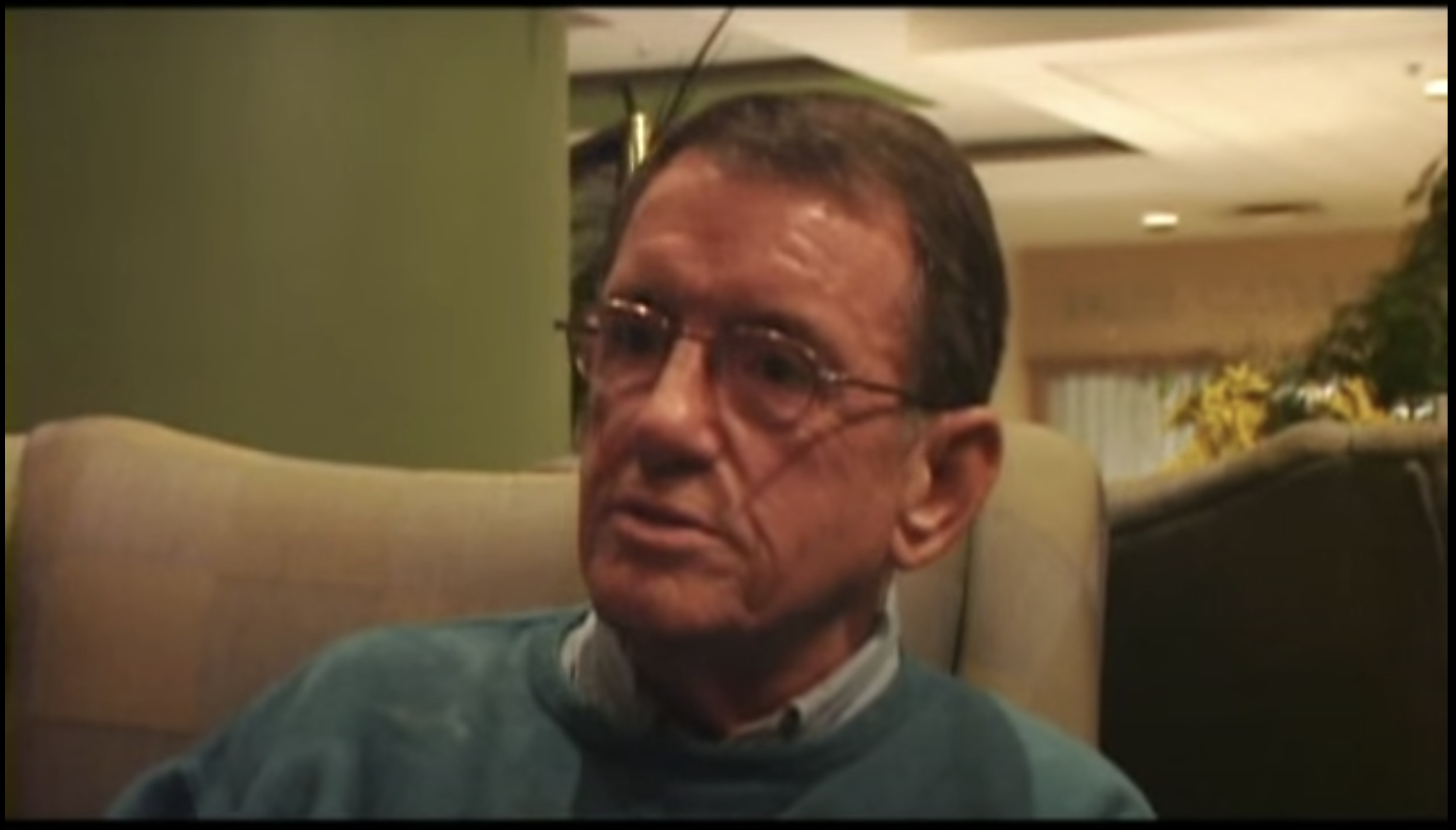
- Whyte in 2012
- Born: March 15, 1940; Scotland
- Died: February 22, 2021 (aged 80); Kelowna, British Columbia, Canada
- Occupations: Novelist; musician; actor

Jack Whyte (March 15, 1940 – February 22, 2021) was a Scottish-Canadian novelist of historical fiction. Born and raised in Scotland, he moved to Canada in 1967. He resided in Kelowna, British Columbia.

== Early life ==
Whyte was born in Scotland on March 15, 1940. He resided there until relocating to Canada in 1967. He was employed at a local school for one year, where he taught English. He subsequently worked as an author, musician, and actor. He and his wife, Beverley, initially lived in Alberta before settling in Kelowna in 1996.

== Writings ==
Whyte's major work was a series of historical novels retelling the story of King Arthur against the backdrop of Roman Britain. This version of the popular legend eschews the use of magic to explain Arthur's ascent to power and instead relies on the historical condition (with some artistic licence) of post-Roman Britain to support the theory that Arthur was meant to counter the anarchy left by the Roman departure from Britain in 410 AD and the subsequent colonization and invasion of Britain by various peoples from Northwestern Europe, including the Saxons, Jutes, Franks, and Angles. Whyte incorporates traditional Arthurian names, places and events (albeit in Gaelic or Latin form) as well as the names of various historical figures that have been suggested as being the possible basis for the original King Arthur legend. The tacit implication is that Whyte's version of history is the true story that has become distorted over time to become the legend and stories of magic that we know today. The series has been published in different locations under three different titles. In Canada it was titled A Dream of Eagles, while in the United States it was retitled The Camulod Chronicles. When it was eventually republished in Great Britain with a different reading order, it became Legends of Camelot.

Whyte served as the official bard of The Calgary Highlanders and performed several tracks of poetry and song on the 1990 recording by the Regimental Pipes and Drums of The Calgary Highlanders entitled Eighty Years of Glory: The Regimental Pipes, Drums and Bard of The Calgary Highlanders.

== Camulod Chronicles ==
=== A Dream of Eagles (Camulod Chronicles or Legends of Camelot) ===
- The Skystone ISBN 9780735233140 (published in Great Britain as War of the Celts)
- The Singing Sword ISBN 9780735237391 (published in Great Britain as The Round Table)
- The Eagles' Brood ISBN 9780735237407 (published in Great Britain as Merlyn)
- The Saxon Shore ISBN 9780735237414 (published in Great Britain as Excalibur)
- The Sorcerer Part 1: The Fort at River's Bend ISBN 9780735237421 (published in Great Britain as The Boy King)
- The Sorcerer Part 2: Metamorphosis ISBN 9780735237278 (published in Great Britain as The Sorcerer)
- Uther ISBN 9780143197706 (published in Great Britain as Pendragon)

The two volumes The Sorcerer: The Fort at River's Bend and The Sorcerer: Metamorphosis were written as a single volume entitled The Sorcerer, but were split for publication.

=== A Dream of Eagles Prequel ===
- The Burning Stone ISBN 9780143196976

=== Golden Eagle (companion mini-series) ===
- Clothar the Frank ISBN 9780735237285 (published as The Lance Thrower in the United States of America, and as Lancelot in Great Britain)
- The Eagle ISBN 9780735237292 (published as The Last Stand in Great Britain)

=== Other ===
- Uther (published as Pendragon in Great Britain) is a stand-alone novel about the life of Uther Pendragon from infancy up until the end of events in The Eagles' Brood. It serves to answer questions left open by The Eagles' Brood that result from the fact that the latter is told exclusively from the perspective of Merlyn Britannicus and as such is not able to explain actions and events of which Merlyn is unaware. Uther is also a companion novel to The Eagles' Brood, as it follows the title character and others as they grow up and wage war on Uther's main enemy, Guhlrys Lot, King of Cornwall.

== The Templar Trilogy ==
- Knights of the Black and White (released August 1, 2006, in Canada) ISBN 9780143183686
- Standard of Honor (released August 28, 2007, in Canada) ISBN 9780143017387
- Order in Chaos (released in August 2009) ISBN 9780143183709

== The Guardians of Scotland ==
- The Forest Laird (2010) ISBN 9780143169093 (published as Rebel in the UK)
- The Renegade (2012) ISBN 9780143186526 (published as Robert the Bruce in the United States in 2013) (published as Resistance in the UK)
- The Guardian (2014) ISBN 9780143169130

== Short fiction ==
Though primarily a novelist, Whyte has also written and published at least one short story:

- "Power Play" in Paradox Magazine, issue 8 (Winter 2005–2006), an exploration of the nature of power, set in Roman Jerusalem. ISSN 1548-0593

== Later life ==
Although Whyte received letters from readers around the world, he lived in obscurity in Kelowna. He died on the night of February 22, 2021, at Kelowna Hospice House. He was 80, and suffered from cancer prior to his death.
