= Journal of Early Medieval Northwestern Europe =

- Discipline: histories, cultures, and peoples of the medieval North Atlantic and North Sea regions
- Language: English
- Edited by: Larry Swain, Deanna Forsman

Publication details
- History: 1999–present
- Publisher: Memorial University of Newfoundland
- Frequency: Irregular

Standard abbreviations
- ISO 4: J. Early Mediev. Northwest. Eur.

Indexing
- ISSN: 1526-1867
- LCCN: sn99004236
- OCLC no.: 42017271

Links
- Journal homepage; Archive of The Heroic Age

Journal of Early Medieval Northwestern Europe (formerly The Heroic Age: A Journal of Early Medieval Northwestern Europe) is a peer-reviewed, open-access, online academic journal founded in 1998, whose first issue was published during spring/summer 1999. The editors-in-chief are currently L. J. Swain (Bemidji State University) and Deanna Forsman (North Hennepin Community College). The title of the journal refers to the early medieval period.

== Scope ==
As of January 2024, shortly after the renaming of the journal to Journal of Early Medieval Northwestern Europe, the journal's website stated its mission as

the exploration of all aspects of early medieval Northwestern Europe from c. 300–c. 1400. Our mission is to provide a forum for the investigation of the histories, cultures, and peoples of the medieval North Atlantic and North Sea regions in their local, intercultural, and global contexts. We seek to publish work using a variety of methodologies and frameworks both emergent and traditional. We welcome innovative approaches to the field.

Regular features include full-length research articles, editions and translations of primary sources, biographical essays, a forum on modern theory and scholarship, a review of relevant web-sites ("Electronic Medievalia"), reviews of scholarship originally published in German, Dutch, and French (a column called "Continental Business"), as well as book reviews (including reviews of scholarly monographs and fiction based on the Middle Ages), and film and television reviews.

The journal is included databases and bibliographies including the MLA Directory of Periodicals and International Bibliography, EBSCO's Electronic Journal Service, the History of Science Society, and others.

== History ==
The founder and the first editor-in-chief of the journal was Michelle Ziegler. Larry Swain, who later became one of the editors-in-chief, wrote that the original idea was that The Heroic Age should appear quarterly, but in the event, The Heroic Age began as a biannual journal: it had a spring/summer and a fall/winter issue in 1999 and in 2000. Two issues were also published in 2010, when the journal published a cluster of essays in tandem with postmedieval: a journal of cultural medieval studies. However, the frequency of published issues decreased in the new millennium. No issues of the journal were published in 2002, 2011, 2013, and 2014. Otherwise (that is, in 2001, 2003–2009, 2012, and 2015), one issue per year was published. The website of the journal also had a links page, which was noted in a review of 2005 for being "a well-designed portal for this specific time period".

On previous versions of the journal's website, calls for papers, and other sources, the period covered by the journal has been defined as stretching "from the early 4th through 13th centuries", "from the beginning of the fourth century through the beginning of the thirteenth", "from the late fourth through eleventh centuries", "from 400-1100 AD", "approximately [...] between 300 and 1200 CE", and "from the late Roman empire to the advent of the Norman empire". This variation is (partly, at least) accounted for in the "Letter from the Editor" in Issue 10 (May 2007) as related to changes in the editorial board of the journal:

our Editorial Board experienced a few changes. While some members retired, we also added several new members [...] With these changes in board composition, our attentions necessarily shifted: four of the five new members do significant work on the continent. To address this, our new Mission Statement increases the time period we consider from 400–1100 to 300–1200. Likewise, there is an accompanying shift in geography. Our new Mission Statement addresses all of Northwestern Europe evenly rather than stressing the British Isles.

Publications in The Heroic Age covered all aspects of Early Medieval Northwestern Europe. As of 2015, the journal sought, according to its own homepage, "to foster dialogue between all scholars of this period across ethnic and disciplinary boundaries, including—but not limited to—history, archaeology, and literature pertaining to the period".
