= A Dream of Eagles =

Series of historical novels by Jack Whyte

- The Skystone; The Singing Sword; The Eagles' Brood; The Saxon Shore; The Fort at River's Bend; Metamorphosis; Uther; Clothar the Frank; The Eagle
- Author: Jack Whyte
- Country: Canada
- Language: English
- Genre: Historical novels
- Publisher: Penguin Books
- Published: 1992 - 2005

A Dream of Eagles is a historical novel series written by the Canadian author Jack Whyte. It was published in the United States as the Camulod Chronicles.

The novels are a rendition of the Arthurian legend that attempts to propose a possible explanation for the foundation of Camulod (an alternate spelling of Camelot), Arthur's heritage, and the political situation surrounding his existence. The setting of the series begins during the Roman departure from Britain and continues for 150 years, ending during the settlement of Britain by the Germanic Angles, Saxons, and Jutes.

Whyte later wrote a prequel, titled The Burning Stone, which was published in 2019.

== Books in the series ==
#	Title	1st Edition	Notes	ISBN
1.	The Skystone	1992	Publius Varrus, Roman-occupied Britain	ISBN 978-0-14-017050-4
2.	The Singing Sword	1993	Publius Varrus, Roman withdrawal complete	ISBN 978-0-14-017049-8
3.	The Eagles' Brood	1994	Uther and Merlyn control Camulod	ISBN 978-0-14-017048-1
4.	The Saxon Shore	1995	Merlyn raises Arthur	ISBN 978-0-14-017047-4
5.	The Fort at River's Bend (The Sorcerer, Volume 1)	1999	Arthur grows to manhood	ISBN 978-0-14-025467-9
6.	Metamorphosis (The Sorcerer, Volume 2)	1999	Merlyn becomes a sorcerer, Arthur becomes king	ISBN 978-0-670-87823-9
7.	Uther	2001	Stand-alone novel about Uther (covers same time period as Eagle's Brood)	ISBN 978-0-14-026087-8
8.	Clothar the Frank	2004	Lancelot arrives in Arthur's court	ISBN 978-0-312-86929-8
9.	The Eagle	2005	Concluding novel, Arthur's reign ends	ISBN 978-0-8125-6899-8

== Reviews ==
Publishers Weekly, reviewing the final book in the series, called it a welcoming conclusion, which would be especially appreciated by its fans, describing it as "an imaginative if rambling account of the end of the Arthurian era." They felt that the plot was "overburdened with a stew of subplots and backstories," using Clothar's affair with a betrothed woman and the account of paternity of Arthur's son, Mordred as examples. A Library Journal reviewer commended its "inventive uses of traditional parts of the Arthurian legend," making it "a welcome addition to the many retellings of a classic tale."
