= The Knight of the Sacred Lake =

2000 novel by Rosalind Miles

- First UK edition
- Author: Rosalind Miles
- Language: English
- Series: The Guenevere Novels
- Genre: Historical novel
- Publisher: Simon & Schuster (UK); Crown Books (US)
- Publication date: 2000
- Publication place: United States
- Media type: Print (Hardback & Paperback)
- Pages: 464 pp
- ISBN: 0-609-80802-8
- OCLC: 47206557
- Dewey Decimal: 823/.914 22
- LC Class: PR6063.I319 K65 2001
- Followed by: The Child of the Holy Grail

The Knight of the Sacred Lake is a historical fantasy novel by Rosalind Miles. It was first published in 2000 by Simon & Schuster in the UK followed by Crown Books in the US. The book is a retelling of the Arthurian legend and follows the lives of Queen Guinevere, consort of King Arthur and her struggles with the king's nephews Agravain and Gawain; the queen is torn between her love for her husband, her land, and her lover, Lancelot. The book was part of a series, The Guinevere Novels, and was followed by The Child of the Holy Grail. Reviewing the book, Publishers Weekly described it as "a lush, feminist take on the English epic".

== Plot introduction ==
The Knight of the Sacred Lake is a variant of an Arthurian legend. It follows the lives of Queen Guinevere, or Guenevere, and her strife with Agravain and Gawain, as well as that of her lover's, Lancelot, as they both enter different paths in their lives, away from each other.

== Plot summary ==
As High King and Queen, Arthur and Guenevere rule across the many kingdoms of Great Britain. Still, Guenevere secretly mourns the loss of Lancelot, whom she loves and who has returned to the Sacred Lake of his boyhood, hoping to restore his faith in chivalry in the place where he learned to be a knight. In a Pentecost ceremony, new knights are sworn to the Round Table, including Arthur's nephews, Agravain and Gawain. After many years of strife, peace is restored to Guenevere's realm.

But betrayal, jealousy, and ancient blood feuds fester unseen. Morgan le Fay, now the mother of Arthur's only son, Mordred, has become the focus of Merlin's age-old quest to ensure the survival of the house of Pendragon. From the east comes the shattering news that Guenevere may have a rival for Lancelot's love. A bleak shadow falls again across Camelot—and across the sacred isle of Avalon, where Roman priests threaten the life of the Lady herself. At the center of the storm is Guenevere, torn between her love for her husband, her people, and Sir Lancelot of the Lake.

== Characters in "Guenevere, Queen of the Summer Country" ==
- Guenevere - Queen of the Summer Country, protagonist, narrator
- Lancelot - Guenevere's lover and second protagonist
- King Arthur - Guenevere's husband
- Agravain
- Gawain
- Merlin
- Mordred - Son of Morgan and Arthur
- Morgan le Fay
- Amir - Deceased son of Arthur and Guenevere

== Major themes ==
Arthurian Legend

== Literary significance & criticism ==
- "The popular and prolific Miles injects the tale with poesy... an engrossing if unorthodox read. No doubt Miles's fans will be pleased with this lush, feminist take on the English epic."

- Publishers Weekly

== Sources, references, external links, quotations ==
- http://www.randomhouse.com/crown/catalog/display.pperl?isbn=9780609808023
- http://www.rosalind.net

Specific
