= The Firebrand (Kemp novel) =

Book by Debra A. Kemp

- Author: Debra A. Kemp
- Original title: The House of Pendragon I: The Firebrand
- Cover artist: Trace Edward Zaber
- Language: English
- Series: The House of Pendragon
- Genre: historical/fantasy fiction
- Publisher: Amber Quill Press
- Publication date: October 2003
- Publication place: USA
- English publication date: October 2003
- Media type: Print ()trade paperback
- Pages: 266
- ISBN: 1-59279-883-7
- OCLC: 54013513
- Followed by: The House of Pendragon II: The Recruit

The Firebrand is a fantasy historical novel by Debra A. Kemp and first published by Amber Quill Press. It is the first in the House of Pendragon series; it was followed by The Recruit published in January 2007.

== Plot summary ==
After the fall of Camelot at the Battle of Camlann, Lin, daughter of King Arthur and Queen Gwenhwyfar, is torn by grief and self-doubt. Believing herself unworthy to follow in her father's wake, Lin leaves Camelot. Twelve years later, while exploring the deserted castle with her four children, Lin tells them about her own childhood in the distant kingdom of Orkney, before she learned the truth of her birth.

Lin's earliest memories are of sorrow and hardship as a slave in the castle of Arthur's half-sister Queen Morgause. At five years old, the only mother she knows dies, leaving Lin alone with Dafydd, the boy she believes is her true elder brother. On Lin's twelfth birthday, she is given a slave collar and a new master: Prince Mordred, who knows she, not he, is the true heir to the throne of Camelot.

After Lin resists Mordred's every attempt to break her spirit, Mordred decides to sell Dafydd. But through a misunderstanding, Lin is sent to the auction block as well. King Arthur's brother Sir Kay witnesses the auction in progress. Appalled to see children for sale, he frees all those who have not been sold, including Lin. Kay notices her family resemblance and takes Lin to Arthur, who wants to avenge his innocent daughter for the abuse she endured. Lin has several reasons for stopping her father. She views slavery as a stigma and wants it to remain secret. She also realizes she cannot let her father fight her battles. She must face Mordred alone as she has always done.

== Critical reaction ==
Kathleen Cunningham Guler, author of In the Shadow of the Dragons, wrote that The Firebrand "skillfully blends history, legend and fiction in a story that illuminates one of the darkest corners of the Arthurian legend". British historian Roland Rotherham stated the novel was "highly readable, highly enjoyable and highly recommended".

=== Awards and nominations ===
- 2005 EPPIE nominee for best historical fiction
- 2003 Dream Realm Award nominee for best fantasy

== Publication history ==
- 2003, USA, Amber Quill Press (ISBN 1-59279-883-7), pub date October, 2003, hardback (first edition)
