= The Skystone =

Historical fiction novel by Jack Whyte

- First edition (Canadian)
- Author: Jack Whyte
- Cover artist: Sharon Matthews
- Language: English
- Series: A Dream of Eagles (aka The Camulod Chronicles in USA)
- Genre: Historical novel
- Publisher: Forge Books (Tor)
- Publication date: 1992
- Publication place: Canada
- Media type: Print (Hardback & Paperback)
- Pages: 352 pp
- ISBN: 0-312-86091-9
- OCLC: 56358622
- Followed by: The Singing Sword

The Skystone is a historical fiction novel written by Jack Whyte, which was first published in 1992. The story is told by a Roman officer called Publius Varrus, who is an expert blacksmith as well as a soldier. In the early fifth century, amid the violent struggles between the people of Britain and the invading Saxons, Picts and Scots, he and his former general, Caius Britannicus, forge the government and military system that will become known as the Round Table, and initiate a chain of events that will lead to the coronation of the High King known as Arthur.

== Plot ==
Invasion

The book begins with Publius Varrus laying its framework: he is retelling his history and the history of the Roman withdrawal from Britain. He then begins by talking about an ambush by Celts where he and Caius Britannicus are injured. While thinking about his time spent with Britannicus recovering from these injuries, his thoughts lead to their meeting: Britannicus had been a captive of Berbers and Varrus freed him from them. After this encounter Varrus recalls how he and Britannicus traveled together to Britain to become primus pilus and legate, respectively, of Legion XX Valeria Victrix's Second Millarian Cohort.

While they are in command of this unit, Hadrian's wall is overcome by a horde of Picts and other Celtic Tribes. The unit spends a year and a half fighting their way back to Roman Controlled Britain. Outside of Londinium they encounter a legion from the army of Theodosius.

Colchester

After Varrus recovers from his injuries, he returns to Colchester, the location of his birth. When he returns he finds that his boyhood friend, and his grandfather's helper, Equus had ensured that his grandfather's smithy was not devoid of tools. Varrus begins to run the business again, striking deals with Cuno, Equus's brother-in-law. Varrus also gains several contracts with the local legion, because his swords use a higher quality of iron than the other local suppliers.

Britannicus visits the Colchester legion and finds Varrus. While they are attending a military party, Britannicus proposes that he may create a colony similar to the Bagaudae's colonies in Gaul. After a visit when Varrus explains his grandfather's use of skystone metal to create the hardest sword and dagger in existence, Varrus and Plautus discover a conspiracy by family enemies of Britannicus, the Senecas. Another encounter with the Senecas follows several years later as Varrus and Plautus interfere with the youngest of the Seneca brothers. Their encounters ends with Varrus beating the brother up and carving a V into his chest.

The attack leads to a massive manhunt by the military because the youngest Seneca had connections with the emperor and the military hierarchy. Because of the persistent nature of this search and a conviction that the eldest brother, Primus, would eventually figure out who his brother's attacker was, Varrus flees Colchester. First heading to Verulamium, he beds Equus's sister, Pheobe who had previously bedded him for the first time since his injury. From there he leaves for Aquae Sulis, where Britannicus owns a villa.

Westering

On the road to Aquae Sulis, Varrus encounters several bandits who attempt to murder him. He later, after another assassination attempt, finds out that these men had been hired by the Senecas. He finally arrives in Aquae Sulis and encounters Britannicus's brother-in-law Quintus Varo. Varo invites Varrus to his villa. At the villa, Varrus meets Caius Britannicus's sister Luceiia. Also while at the villa Varrus encounters a Welsh hunchback Cymric. Varrus demonstrates the African bow which his grandfather had left in his collection of weapons.

Luceiia and Varrus return to the Britannicus villa. While there Luceiia introduces him to a druid who has knowledge of meteor shower that coincides with when Varrus the Elder discovered his skystone. The local people had called this the return of dragons, a local myth that had revolved around covert smelting and metal working by the Pendragons, a local tribe. The druid leads Luceiia and Varrus to the location where a number of cattle had been killed during that same night. There they find impact craters and a lake unknown to the druid. On a return trip from the site, the party gets caught in the dark during a downpour. The druid leads them to a hamlet where they take shelter in a cottage. While there Luceiia and Varrus express a growing interest in each other and agree to marry each other.

The Dragon's Nest

Varrus finds seven sky stones in the valley, all marked by donut-shaped impact craters. He digs all of them up but they are all small, and Varrus does not think that these are large enough for the cataclysm that happened to the cattle. Meanwhile, Caius Britannicus returns to the villa. Upon his arrival he expresses his approval of Varrus and Luceiia's wedding, invitations are sent out and a number of individual soon begin arriving, among which is Equus with Varrus's smithing materials from Colchester. Also among the arrivals is Bishop Alric who, along with a military friend Atonious Cicero, tell Varrus of Pheobe's death by the hands of Caesarius Seneca, the youngest Seneca.

The wedding is a jolly event despite Varrus' grief over Pheobe. A large group of friends stay at the villa for several weeks. Soon after the wedding Britannicus's friends, Tera and Firma, bring news that they lost their trading fleet to pirates. This news shakes the men of the group and they spend a long night discussing Brittanicus's proposition of a military colony. They all agree to begin recruiting in the colony and invest their livelihoods in the purchase of the villas surrounding Caius's and Varo's. Varrus is also able to discover the main part of the meteor, which is buried under the bed of a lake in the valley. By employing a handful of military engineers, Varrus drains the lake and retrieves the stone.

The Dragon's Breath

While visiting Aquae Sulis Varrus encounters Quinctilius Nesca, a cousin of the Senecas. Varrus escapes with the help of a trader who had been hoodwinked by Nesca and by killing two of Nesca's guards. The man mysteriously dies during Varrus's escape. While he escapes, Varrus also learns that Seneca had returned to Britain. Varrus places him under surveillance and soon hatches a plot which he carries through to kill Seneca.

Meanwhile, agents of the King of the Pendragon clan, Ullic, approaches Britannicus and entreats him for a meeting between the two leaders. They meet and after some vocal sparring the two agree to a protective alliance between the two regional powers as Britons. Soon after Bishop Alaric passes through the region again, telling the Colonists, they now called themselves such, that Frankish cavalry was now running rampant in parts of the empire, and that the political tensions were rising. Also, Alaric brings news of Caius's son Picus, who was now aligned with the Roman emperor in Constantinople and the a new military commander Stilicho who favored the use of heavy cavalry.

In the final chapter, Varrus reveals that he was able to smelt his skystone and casts a statue of the Celtic goddess Coventina who Varrus names The Lady of the Lake.

== Characters ==
- Publius Varrus- a Roman soldier whose exploits have earned him the rank of primus pilus in the Valeria Victrix or the XX Legion of the Roman Army. Though initially he was stationed on the North African coast, he was given permission to return to Britain, the land of his birth. His grandfather, Varrus the Elder, taught his namesake about all the intricacies of being a master smith.
- Caius Britannicus - also a native of Britain and commander of a division Valeria Victrix. He is an upper-class Roman and Varrus's commanding officer.
- Equus - boyhood friend of Varrus and business partner in the new forge.
- Plautus - a senior centurion stationed in the fort near Colchester. He and Varrus had been friends while they were stationed at a post in Africa and renewed their friendship when they meet in Colchester.
- Bishop Alaric - a Christian bishop who is unhappy with the church's and Rome's ostentatious livelihoods. He tries to incorporate the Celtic artistic traditions, such as the Celtic knot, into Christian symbolism in order to make Christianity more accessible to the local Britons. He commissions Varrus to make silver crosses in this style.
- Quintus Varo - a neighboring farmer, and close friend of the Brittanicus family.
- Luceiia Britannicus - the sister of Caius Britannicus. She is portrayed by Varo as being extremely manly in temperament, however, Varrus soon finds out she is gorgeous. She, however, has taken on a more independent temperament because she has lost two husbands, so has had to manage her life as well as Caius's estates

== Style ==
Instead of using proper Latin names for terminology, Whyte anglicizes many of the terms. For example, cohors milliaria is consistently termed a Milliarian Cohort.

The text takes the form of an autobiographic memoir written as the information appears in the mind of Varrus not as it appears chronologically. In the first book, the time jumps from the present to the time when Britannicus and Varrus are injured, to when they met in Africa, back to the present, to retelling the Celtic breach of Hadrian's wall, back to the time when they were injured, back to the present. Because of this, often conversation and events will be glossed, while at other times the use of dialogue is common.

Each of the first three books of the novel involves an erotic encounter between Varrus and a sister of one of his friends.

== Reception ==
A review in the Fantasy Book Review, described the novel as "one of the potentially better explanations for the historical fact [and] one of the finest Arthurian historical series available". Reception of the novel in Kirkus reviews was positive calling the novel "an earnestly heroic tale" with "old-timey manly sentiments, some battle grue, info about smelting iron, and a modestly clever Arthurian-linked gimmick". A review in FantasyLiterature.com was a mixed, disappointedly describing the novel as "concerned with reflection, consideration and dialogue".
