= Uther Pendragon =

Father of King Arthur in Arthurian legend

- Matter of Britain character
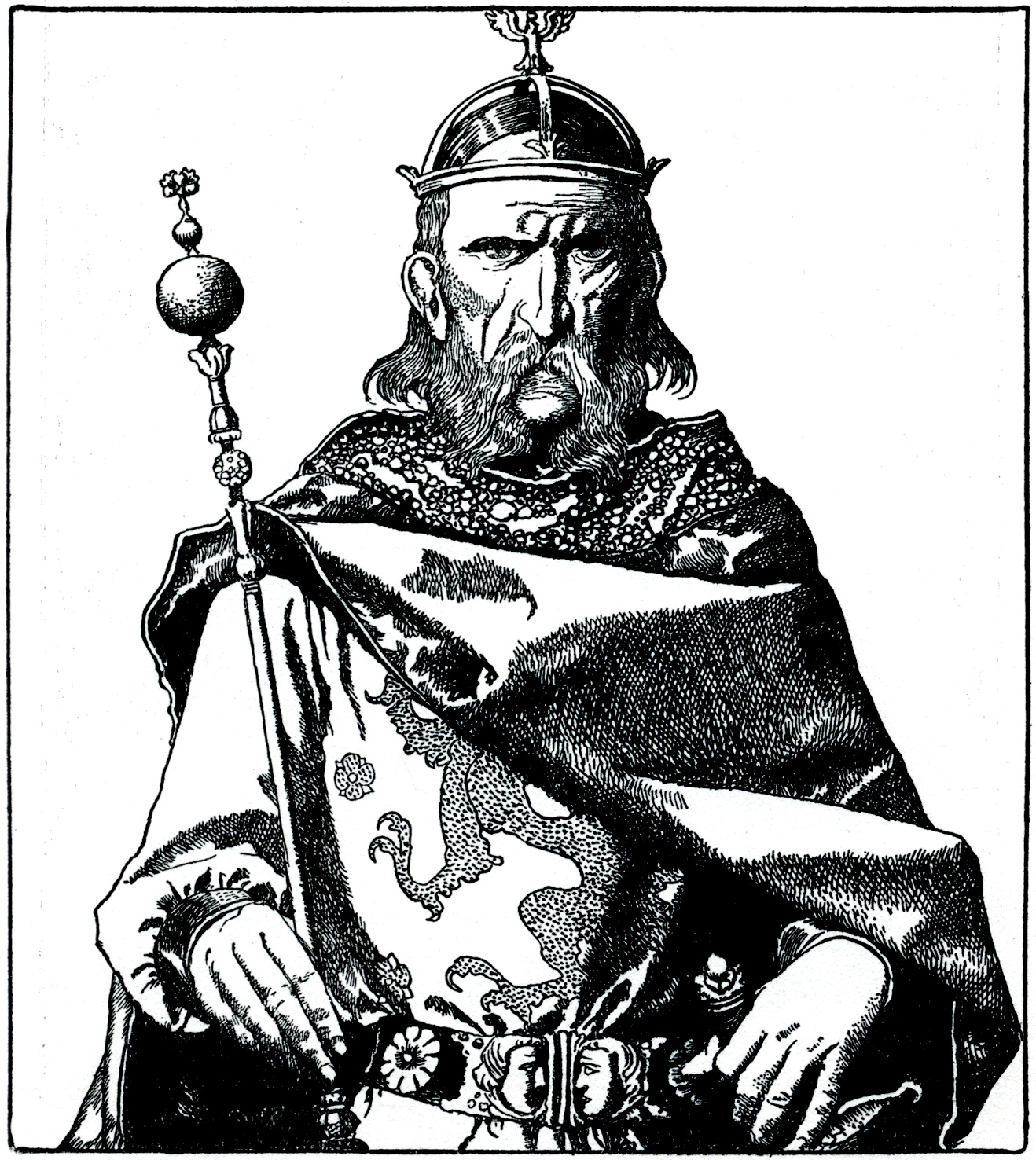
- Uther Pendragon, by Howard Pyle from The Story of King Arthur and His Knights (1903)
- Created by: Geoffrey of Monmouth

In-universe information
- Title: Pendragon
- Occupation: King of sub-Roman Britain
- Family: Constantine III (father); Constans (eldest brother); Aurelius Ambrosius (older brother); Moigne (brother)
- Spouse: Igraine
- Children: Madoc ap Uthyr, Arthur, Anna, Morgan le Fay (stepdaughter)
- Religion: Christianity (in later medieval traditions)
- Origin: Britain

Uther Pendragon (/ˈ(j)uːθər pɛnˈdræɡən/ (Y)OO-thər pen-DRAG-ən; Welsh: Uthr Bendragon), also known as King Uther (or Uter), was a legendary King of the Britons and father of King Arthur.

A few minor references to Uther appear in Old Welsh poems, but his biography was first written down in the 12th century by Geoffrey of Monmouth in his Historia Regum Britanniae (History of the Kings of Britain), and Geoffrey's account of the character was used in most later versions. He is a fairly ambiguous individual throughout the literature, but is described as a strong king and a defender of his people.

According to Arthurian legend, Merlin magically disguises Uther to look like his enemy Gorlois, enabling Uther to sleep with Gorlois' wife Lady Igraine. Thus Arthur, "the once and future king", is an illegitimate child (though later legend, as found in Malory, emphasises that the conception occurred after Gorlois's death and that he was legitimised by Uther's subsequent marriage to Igraine). This act of conception occurs the very night that Uther's troops kill Gorlois. Differing versions of the Arthurian story see the theme of illegitimate conception being repeated in Arthur's siring of Mordred by his own half-sister Morgause in the 13th-century French prose cycles. It is Mordred who mortally wounds King Arthur in the Battle of Camlann.

== Epithet ==
Uther's epithet Pendragon is attested in Middle Welsh poetry as a title meaning 'leader of warriors', a combination of pen 'head; fig. leader' and dragon, a poetic word for warriors derived from the Latin plural dracones. Geoffrey of Monmouth in Historia Regum Britanniae misinterpreted it as "the head of a dragon" and invented an origin to explain it away: Uther acquired the epithet when he witnessed a portentous dragon-shaped comet (see Firedrake (folklore)), which inspired him to use dragons on his standards. According to Robert de Boron and the cycles based on his work, it was Uther's older brother (elsewhere called Aurelius Ambrosius and likely based on Ambrosius Aurelianus) who saw the comet and received the name "Pendragon", Uther taking his epithet after his death.

== Early Welsh poetry ==
Though the Welsh tradition of the Arthurian legend is fragmentary, some material exists through the Welsh Triads and various poems. Uther appears in these fragments, where he is associated with Arthur and, in some cases, even appears as his father.

He is mentioned in the circa 10th-century Arthurian poem "Pa gur yv y porthaur?" ("What man is the gatekeeper?"), where it is only said of him that Mabon son of Modron is his servant. He is also memorialised with "The Death-song of Uther Pen" from the Book of Taliesin. The latter includes a reference to Arthur, so the marginal addition of "dragon" to Uther's name is probably justified. "The Colloquy of Arthur and the Eagle", a modern manuscript from the 16th century but believed to have originated from the 13th century, mentions another son of Uther named Madoc, the father of Arthur's nephew Eliwlod.

In Triad 28, Uthyr is named the creator of one of the Three Great Enchantments of the Island of Britain, which he taught to the wizard Menw. Since Menw is a shapeshifter according to Culhwch and Olwen, it might be that Uther was one as well. If this is so, it opens up the possibility that Geoffrey of Monmouth's narrative about Uther impregnating Igerna with Merlin's help (see below) was taken from a Welsh legend where Uthyr changed his own shape, Merlin possibly being added to the story by Geoffrey.

Uthyr's other reference, Triad 51, shows influence from Monmouth's Historia. It follows Geoffrey's description of Uther as brother of both Aurelius Ambrosius ("Emrys Wledig") and Constans II ("Custennin the Younger"). However, its account of Uther's parentage differs; Triad 51 describes Uther's father to be Constantine III ("Custennin the Blessed") son of Elen, while Monmouth describes Uther's father to be Constantine, brother of King Aldroen of Armorica.

== Historia Regum Britanniae ==
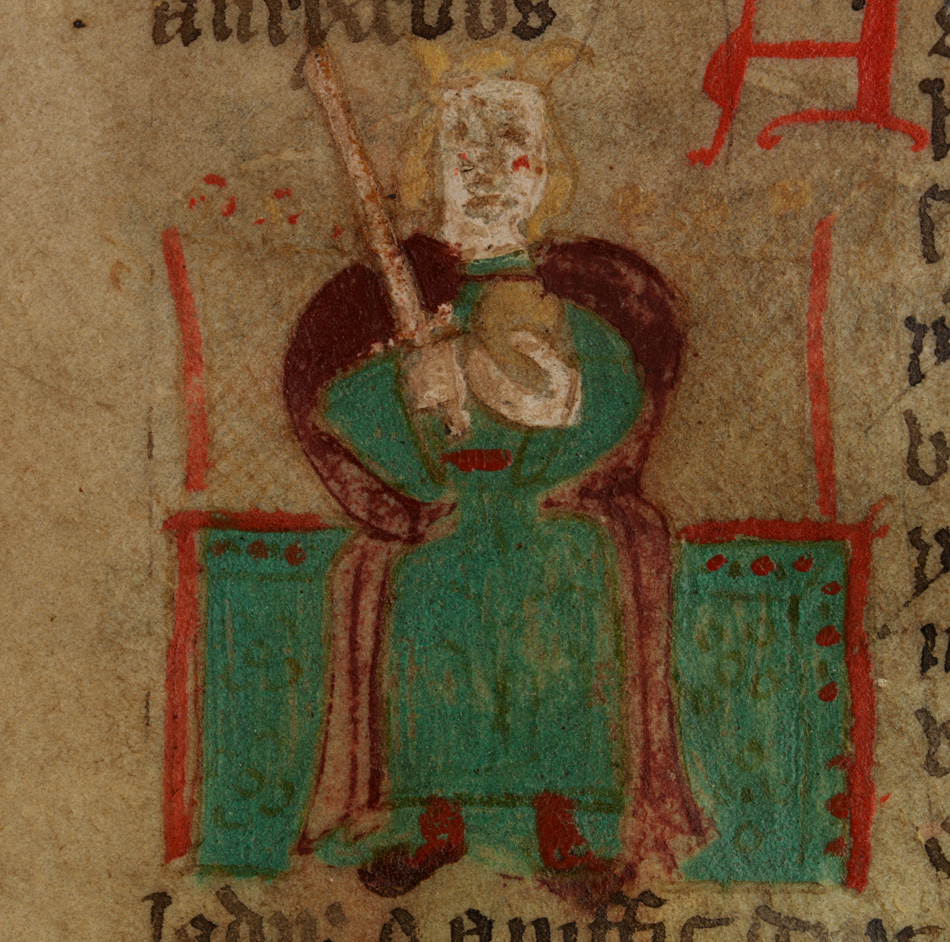
Uther Pendragon in a crude illustration from a 15th-century Welsh version of Historia Regum Britanniae

Uther is best known from Geoffrey's Historia Regum Britanniae (1136) where he is the youngest son of King of Britannia, Constantine. His eldest brother Constans succeeds to the throne on their father's death, but is murdered at the instigation of his adviser Vortigern, who seizes the throne. Uther and his other brother, Aurelius Ambrosius, still children, flee to Brittany. Vortigern makes an alliance with the Saxons under Hengist, but it goes disastrously wrong. Aurelius and Uther return, now adults. Aurelius burns Vortigern in his castle and becomes king.

With Aurelius on the throne, Uther leads his brother in arms to Ireland to help Merlin bring the stones of Stonehenge from there to Britain. Later, while Aurelius is ill, Uther leads his army against Vortigern's son Paschent and his Saxon allies. On the way to the battle, he sees a comet in the shape of a dragon, which Merlin interprets as presaging Aurelius's death and Uther's glorious future. Uther wins the battle and takes the epithet "Pendragon", and returns to find that Aurelius has been poisoned by an assassin. He becomes king and orders the construction of two gold dragons, one of which he uses as his standard.

He secures Britain's frontiers and quells Saxon uprisings with the aids of his retainers, one of whom is Gorlois, Duke of Cornwall. At a banquet celebrating their victories, Uther becomes obsessively enamoured of Gorlois' wife Igerna (Igraine), and a war ensues between Uther and his vassal. Gorlois sends Igerna to the impregnable castle of Tintagel for protection while he himself is besieged by Uther in another town. Uther consults with Merlin who uses his magic to transform the king into the likeness of Gorlois and thus gain access to Igerna at Tintagel. He spends the night with her and they conceive Arthur, but the next morning it is discovered that Gorlois had been killed. Uther marries Igerna and they have a daughter called Anna (in later romances she is called Morgause and is usually Igerna's daughter by her previous marriage). Morgause later marries King Lot and becomes the mother of Gawain and Mordred.

Uther later falls ill and the wars against the Saxons begin to go badly. He insists on leading his army himself, propped up on his horse. He defeats Hengist's son Octa at Verulamium (St Albans), despite the Saxons calling him the "Half-Dead King". However, the Saxons soon contrive his death by poisoning a spring which he drinks from near Verulamium.

Uther's family is based on some historical figures; Aurelius Ambrosius is Ambrosius Aurelianus, mentioned by Gildas, though his connection to Constantine and Constans is unrecorded. It is possible that Uther himself is based at least partially on Tewdrig, a historical king of Glywysing in the sixth century, given the strong similarities between their death stories. Depending on the source, Uther may either be the son of Constantine III, as is related in the Welsh Triad 51, or he may be the son of Constantine of Dumnonia, as related in Monmouth's History of the Kings of Britain.

== Other medieval literature ==
In Robert de Boron's Merlin, Uther Pendragon kills Hengist after an assassination attempt by the Saxon leader and Merlin creates the Round Table for him. In the Prose Lancelot, Uther Pendragon claims to have been born in Bourges. He takes an army to Brittany to fight against King Claudas at Bourges, a situation resembling that of the historical ruler Riothamus who went to Brittany to fight ravagers based in Bourges. Uther also appears in the chivalric romance Sir Cleges as the king to whom Sir Cleges brings the Christmas cherries, obtained by miracle.

There is an alternative account of Uther Pendragon's background in Wolfram von Eschenbach's Parzival. A certain Mazadân went with a fairy named Terdelaschoye to the land of Feimurgân. (This looks like a garbling of some source that told of Mazadân's alliance with the Fay Morgan in Terre de la Joye; the "Land of Joy".) Mazadân becomes father of two sons, Lazaliez and Brickus. Brickus becomes father of Utepandragûn, father of Arthur, while the elder son, Lazaliez, becomes father of Gandin of Anjou, father of Gahmuret, father of Parzival (Percival). Uther Pendragon and Arthur here appear as the scions of the junior branch of an unattested House of Anjou. Early German literature's motif of Uther's descent from fairies, believed to have relied on some now lost Celtic material, may have been meant to explain Arthur's connection with Avalon. Since, according to Geoffrey of Monmouth, Caliburn was a gift from Avalon, and Arthur was taken to Avalon to be healed. Layamon in his Brut also said that Arthur was given various blessings by fairies.

Richard Carew's Survey of Cornwall (1602) drew on an earlier French writer, Nicholas Gille, who mentions Moigne, brother of Uther and Aurelius, who was duke of Cornwall, and "governor of the Realme" under Emperor Honorius. Carew's brief account of Arthur's birth also mentions a sister, Amy, also born to Uther and Igraine.

== Modern works ==
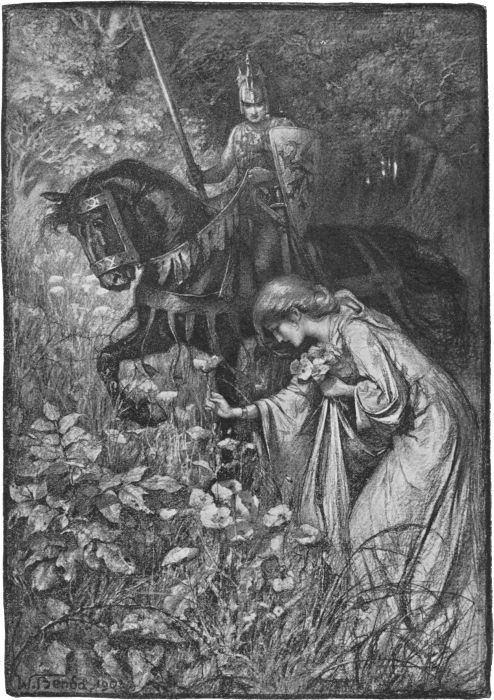
Uther, on horseback and disguised as Pelleas, watches Igraine picking flowers in Uther and Igraine by Warwick Deeping, illustrated by Wladyslaw T. Benda

Uther Pendragon remains a widely used character in modern Arthurian literature and other fiction.

- In T. H. White's The Once and Future King, Uther the Conqueror is the Norman King of England.
- Mary Stewart's first two books in her Arthurian saga, The Crystal Cave and The Hollow Hills, feature Uther Pendragon as Merlin's uncle, Merlin being his brother Ambrosius' illegitimate son. Uther is depicted as a mostly decent but rather oversexed character, who becomes impotent in later life because of a groin injury, a Fisher King figure.
- In Bernard Cornwell's The Warlord Chronicles, Uther is the King of Dumnonia as well as the High King of Britain. In these novels, Arthur is his illegitimate son and Morgan is his illegitimate daughter. At the start of the trilogy's first novel The Winter King, Uther is old and in failing health. His son Mordred has been killed during a battle with the Saxons, leaving behind a pregnant wife. Uther blames Arthur, who was at the battle, for his son's death and banishes him to Armorica. His daughter-in-law, Princess Norwenna, gives birth to a son, whom Uther names Mordred after his father, and who he proclaims his heir. However, the decision is controversial as the child will not come of age before Uther's death and has a clubfoot, a bad omen for the superstitious British. Uther dismisses these concerns and proclaims that Mordred will succeed him, enlisting the support of the other kings of Britain to ensure it. However, in response to his allies' concerns and his own people's demand, he reluctantly appoints Arthur to be Mordred's guardian until he comes of age. Uther dies soon after and, although he only appears at the start of the first novel, his final decision is the catalyst for most of the conflicts of the trilogy.
- In Jack Whyte's The Camulod Chronicles, Uther is King of the Pendragon, the Celtic people of South Cambria, cousin to Caius Merlyn Britannicus and Ambrose Ambrosianus Britannicus. Whyte's novel Uther, written in 2000, revolves around a fictionalised version of Uther's life.
- In contrast to traditional versions, Stephen R. Lawhead's Pendragon Cycle makes Uther's brother Aurelius, whose widow (Ygerna) he marries, Arthur's true father.
- In Marion Zimmer Bradley's Mists of Avalon, Uther is the nephew of Aurelianus instead of his brother; while Aurelianus is the son of a Roman Emperor, Uther has no Roman blood.
- In Valerio Massimo Manfredi's The Last Legion, Uther is himself the last Roman Emperor, Romulus Augustus. While the real Romulus Augustus disappeared from history after being deposed by Goths, in the novel he escapes to Britain, where he adopts the name Pendragon and eventually sires Arthur.
- In John Boorman's film Excalibur, Gabriel Byrne plays an ambitious but somewhat obtuse Uther Pendragon, whose uncontrollable lust for Igrayne, while necessary for the birth of Arthur, proves also his own undoing.
- In the 1998 miniseries Merlin, Uther is portrayed by Mark Jax. He is the son of King Constant who seeks to succeed his father's murderer Vortigern as King. Merlin helps him achieve his goals, but Uther's lust for Ygraine causes Merlin to realises Uther is not the good king he supposed him to be, and takes both Uther's son Arthur, and the sword Excalibur from him. Uther later dies, insane and choking on his own vomit.
- In the BBC television series Merlin, Uther, played by Anthony Head, has banned magic in Camelot and slaughtered any who openly practise the art. It is revealed his wife Ygraine was unable to conceive, so Nimueh, a sorceress and friend, helped in the conception of Arthur. However, to keep balance in the world, a life had to be taken in exchange. Thus, Ygraine died at Arthur's birth, and Uther's guilt spurred him to purge all magic from Camelot. His wanton cruelty eventually causes his ward Morgana, who possesses magic herself, to turn against him. She is later revealed as his illegitimate daughter, and covets control of Camelot from then on. In series 4, Uther is wounded when protecting Arthur from an assassin. Merlin tries to heal him but due to Morgana's meddling, the spell instead kills him.
- In the television series Camelot, Uther is poisoned by his daughter Morgana in the first episode.
- In Guy Ritchie's 2017 film King Arthur: Legend of the Sword, Eric Bana plays Uther Pendragon, betrayed and murdered by his brother Vortigern for control over Camelot.
- Sebastian Armesto plays Uther Pendragon in the 2020 Internet TV series Cursed.

== See also ==
- King Arthur's family
- List of legendary kings of Britain
- Pendragon Castle

== Sources ==
- Bromwich, Rachel (2006). Trioedd Ynys Prydein: The Triads of the Island of Britain. University of Wales Press. ISBN 0-7083-1386-8.

Legendary titles
Preceded by Aurelius Ambrosius	King of Britain	Succeeded by Arthur
