= Alone =

Alone most often refers to:

- Solitude, a state of seclusion or isolation
- Loneliness, negative emotions arising from seclusion

Alone may also refer to:

== Film and television ==
=== Film ===
- Alone (1931 French film), by Henri Diamant-Berger
- Alone (1931 Soviet film), by Leonid Trauberg and Grigori Kozintsev
- Alone, a 1991 short film featuring Paul Ben-Victor
- Alone, a 1997 American television film starring Ed Begley Jr.
- Alone (1999 film), a Spanish film by Benito Zambrano
- Alone (2001 film), a Croatian film by Lukas Nola
- Alone (2004 film), a German film
- Alone, a 2004 short film by Gregory Orr
- Alone (2007 film), a Thai horror film by Banjong Pisanthanakun and Parkpoom Wongpoom
- Alone (2008 film), a Turkish film by Çağan Irmak
- Alone (2013 film) or Phobia, an American horror film
- Alone. (2014 film), an American documentary
- Alone (2015 Hindi film), an Indian horror film by Bhushan Patel
- Alone (2015 Kannada film), an Indian action film by JKS
- Alone (2015 Peruvian film), a Peruvian road comedy-drama film by Joanna Lombardi
- Alone (2020 horror film), an American film by Johnny Martin
- Alone (2020 thriller film), an American film by John Hyams
- Alone (2021 film), also known as Seuls, a Canadian documentary by Paul Tom
- Alone (2023 film), an Indian Malayalam-language film by Shaji Kailas
- Alone, a 2023 Taiwanese film starring Michael Huang

=== Television ===
- Alone (TV series), a 2015 American reality game show
- "Alone" (American Crime Story), a 2018 episode
- "Alone" (Battle for Dream Island), a 2025 web series episode
- "Alone" (Black Summer), a 2019 episode
- "Alone" (House), a 2007 episode
- "Alone" (Suspects), a 2014 episode
- "Alone" (The Walking Dead), a 2014 episode
- "Alone" (The X-Files), a 2001 episode

== Literature ==
- Alone (novella), 1903, by August Strindberg
- "Alone" (poem), 1829, by Edgar Allan Poe
- Alone: A Love Story, a 2020 book and podcast (since 2017) by Michelle Parise
- Alone, a 1921 travel book by Norman Douglas
- Alone, a 1938 memoir by Richard Evelyn Byrd

== Music ==
=== Albums ===
- Alone (Bill Evans album), 1970
  - Alone (Again), by Bill Evans, 1977
- Alone (Chet Atkins album), 1973
- Alone (Eleanor McEvoy album), 2011
- Alone (Evan Brewer album), 2011
- Alone (Judy Garland album), 1957
- Alone (Modern Talking album), 1999
- Alone (The Morning After Girls album) or the title song, 2011
- Alone (The Pretenders album) or the title song, 2016
- Alone (Solitude Aeturnus album), 2006
- Alone (Vern Gosdin album) or the title song, 1989
- Alone: Ballads for Solo Piano, by André Previn, 2007
- Alone: The Home Recordings of Rivers Cuomo, 2007
- Alone (EP), by Sistar, or the title song, 2012

=== Songs ===
- "Alone" (1935 song), performed by Allan Jones and Kitty Carlisle in the Marx Brothers film A Night at the Opera
- "Alone" (Alan Walker song), 2016
- "Alone" (Armin van Buuren song), 2014
- "Alone" (B'z song), 1991
- "Alone" (Bee Gees song), 1997
- "Alone" (Big Country song), 1993
- "Alone" (Burna Boy song), 2022
- "Alone" (Chisato Moritaka song), 1988
- "Alone" (The Cure song), 2024
- "Alone" (E.M.D. song), 2008
- "Alone" (Falling in Reverse song), 2013
- "Alone" (Halsey song), 2018
- "Alone" (Hollyn song), 2015
- "Alone" (i-Ten song), 1983; covered by Heart (1987) and Celine Dion (2008)
- "Alone" (Jessie Ware song), 2017
- "Alone" (Jimin song), 2023
- "Alone" (Kim Petras and Nicki Minaj song), 2023
- "Alone" (Lasgo song), 2001
- "Alone" (Lay song), 2015
- "Alone" (Marshmello song), 2016
- "Alone" (Rod Wave song), 2022
- "Alone" (Selah Sue song), 2014
- "Alone (Why Must I Be Alone)", by the Shepherd Sisters, 1957; covered by the Four Seasons (1964)
- "Alone", by Alexandra Stan from Alesta, 2016
- "Alone", by Amorphis from Am Universum, 2001
- "Alone", by Anathema from The Silent Enigma, 1995
- "Alone", by Arcturus from La Masquerade Infernale, 1997
- "Alone", by Avril Lavigne, the B-side of "Girlfriend", 2007
- "Alone", by Babylon, 2021
- "Alone", by Band-Maid from Brand New Maid, 2016
- "Alone", by Bazzi, 2016
- "Alone", by the Beautiful South from Blue Is the Colour, 1996
- "Alone", by Ben Harper from Burn to Shine, 1999
- "Alone", by Blink-182; see List of songs recorded by Blink-182, 1983
- "Alone", by Buckcherry from Music from and Inspired by Mission: Impossible 2, 2000
- "Alone", by Bullet for My Valentine from Fever, 2010
- "Alone", by Carly Simon from Carly Simon, 1971
- "Alone", by Current 93 from Imperium, 1987
- "Alone", by Cyrus Villanueva, 2017
- "Alone", by Dami Im from My Reality, 2021
- "Alone", by the Damned from Music for Pleasure, 1977
- "Alone", by Dan Black from UN, 2009
- "Alone", by Dark Tranquillity from Skydancer, 1993
- "Alone", by Dinosaur Jr. from Hand It Over, 1997
- "Alone", by Doja Cat from Planet Her, 2021
- "Alone", by the Gathering from Home, 2006
- "Alone", by the God Machine from One Last Laugh in a Place of Dying, 1994
- "Alone", by Green Carnation from Acoustic Verses, 2006
- "Alone", by I Prevail from Lifelines, 2016
- "Alone", by Jolin Tsai from Agent J, 2007
- "Alone", by Judas Priest from Nostradamus, 2008
- "Alone", by Justin Timberlake from Everything I Thought It Was, 2024
- "Alone", by Kelly Clarkson from Stronger, 2011
- "Alone", by Love Amongst Ruin from Love Amongst Ruin, 2010
- "Alone", by Mikuni Shimokawa, 2000
- "Alone", by MisterWives from Superbloom, 2020
- "Alone?", by Nightingale from The Breathing Shadow, 1995
- "Alone", by Obscura from Retribution, 2006
- "Alone", by Orchestral Manoeuvres in the Dark, B-side of "If You Want It", 2010
- "Alone", by Parkway Drive from Deep Blue, 2010
- "Alone", by Pearl Jam from Ten, 1991
- "Alone", by Poisonblack from Of Rust and Bones, 2010
- "Alone", by the Prom Kings from The Prom Kings, 2005
- "Alone", by Rag'n'Bone Man from Life by Misadventure, 2021
- "Alone", by Sanctus Real from Fight the Tide, 2004
- "Alone", by Sara Evans from Stronger, 2011
- "Alone", by Sleeping with Sirens from Feel, 2013
- "Alone", by the Spencer Davis Group from Gluggo, 1973
- "Alone", by Stars from There Is No Love in Fluorescent Light, 2017
- "Alone", by Suicidal Tendencies from Lights...Camera...Revolution!, 1990
- "Alone", by Tech N9ne from Boiling Point, 2012
- "Alone", by Toby Lightman from Bird on a Wire, 2006
- "Alone", by Toto from 40 Trips Around the Sun, 2018
- "Alone", by Trevor Daniel, 2021
- "Alone", by Trey Songz from Passion, Pain & Pleasure, 2010
- "Alone", by Waltari from Rare Species, 2004
- "Alone", by Wolves at the Gate from Eclipse, 2019
- "Alone", by Zebrahead from MFZB, 2003

== Places ==
- Alavana, or Alone, an Ancient Roman settlement at Watercrook
- Alone, Kentucky, US, an unincorporated townsite

== Other uses ==
- ALONE, a charity providing support for elderly people in Ireland
- Alone (comic book), 2008, by Christophe Chabouté
- Alone (radio series), a 2017 BBC Radio 4 series
- Alone (Saint Seiya: The Lost Canvas), a fictional character in the manga/anime Saint Seiya: The Lost Canvas
- Alone (writer), Hernán Díaz Arrieta (1891–1984), Chilean literary critic
- Amarna letter EA 282, or "Alone", a 14th-century BC clay tablet at the British Museum

== See also ==
- Alona (disambiguation)
- Alauna (disambiguation)
- Solo (disambiguation)
- Single (disambiguation)
