= Ector (Arthurian legend) =

Legendary Arthurian knight

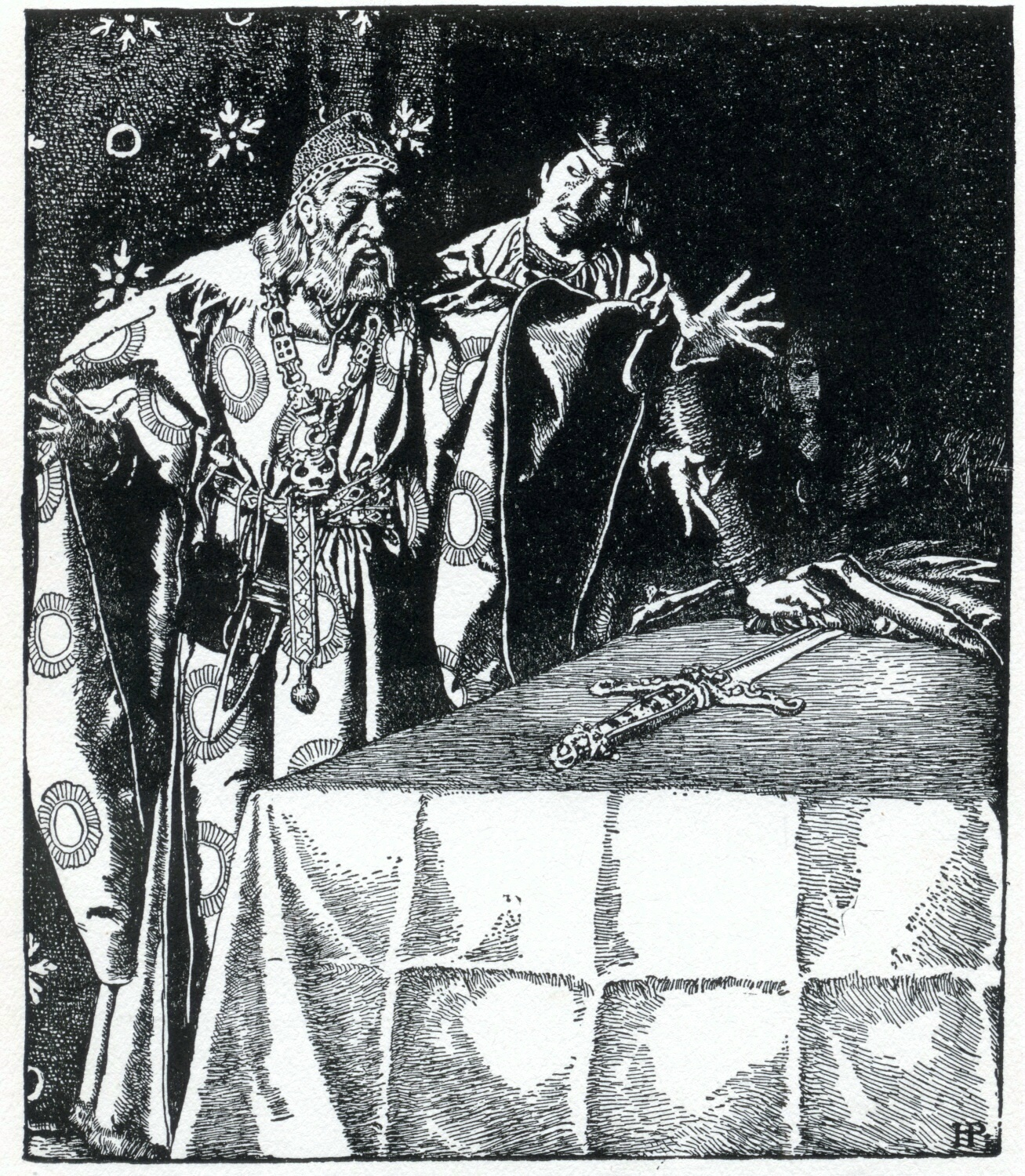
"Sir Kay showeth the mystic sword unto Sir Ector", an illustration in Howard Pyle's The Story of King Arthur and His Knights (1903).

Ector /ˈɛktɔːr, -ər/ is the adoptive father of King Arthur in the Matter of Britain. His biological son is Kay.

== Legend ==
=== Name ===
Alternative variants of his name include Hector, Auctor, Antor (Antour), Ectorius. In the Welsh stories, the father of Kay (Cei) is named Cynyr (Kyner).

=== Portrayals ===
Ector appears in the works of Robert de Boron and the Lancelot-Grail, as well as later adaptations such as the Post-Vulgate Cycle and Thomas Malory's Le Morte d'Arthur. In these versions, Merlin takes the infant Arthur from his biological parents, High King Uther Pendragon and Igraine, and brings him to Ector's estate. Sometimes portrayed as a king instead of merely a lord, Ector has an estate in the country as well as properties in London. Merlin does not reveal the boy's true identity, and Ector takes him on and raises him with Kay as his own son. When Kay is old enough to be knighted, Ector's young ward serves as his squire.

In Malory's telling, Ector also appears in the concluding book to recite a threnody lamenting Sir Lancelot's eventual death. However, the sole surviving manuscript of Mallory's work is missing the pages that would include this material, and at least one scholar has suggested that the speech may have been an addition by the text's printer, William Caxton.

== Modern culture ==
=== Literature ===
- T. H. White's Sir Ector, in The Sword in the Stone (1938), the first volume of his series The Once and Future King, is portrayed as a "bumpkin aristocrat" who pronounces "education" as eddication, although he knows Arthur must be given training "appropriate to a young squire and civilized gentleman." He is "just another knight of adequate wealth and land." His lands lie in the "Forest Sauvage"; some later authors have used this as well.
- Mary Stewart's The Hollow Hills (1973), the second volume in her Merlin Trilogy, is told from the point of view of Merlin as he watches Arthur's childhood and teen years until he takes his place as High King. Here, "solid, dependable Ector" is a "brisk, friendly, matter-of-fact" warrior who styles himself Count of Galava. He is devoted to his wife Drusilla of York, a devout Christian like himself, and their affectionate son Kei is three years older than Arthur. Count Ector is a friend and ally of Merlin's father, Aurelianus Ambrosius and of Uther Pendragon. Geographically, he is a neighbor to King Coel of Rheged and Caw of Strathclyde, but also to Arthur's enemies: King Lot of Lothian and King Urien of Gore. There is nothing clownish about him in Stewart's hands; Merlin describes him as "a cold-brained and calculating officer" in the wars against the Picts and Saxons. The series places Ector's estate in Galava, a fruitful land in Rheged inside the Wild Forest, south of Luguvalium and east of Glannoventa. Galava lies on a large lake with a central craggy island known as Caer Bannog, (Note: Whatever the original location and concept for Stewart's Caer Bannog, it is likely the source name for the Rabbit of Caerbannog in the 1975 Arthurian parody film Monty Python and the Holy Grail.) where 14-year-old Arthur finds and takes the sword which he names Caliburn. Stewart writes that the island is haunted (or guarded) by Bilis, a dwarf deity of the Otherworld and of underground spaces, rather than by the Lady of the Lake.

=== Other media ===
- In the 1963 Walt Disney Studios animated film The Sword in the Stone, adapted from T. H. White's telling, Sir Ector is voiced by actor Sebastian Cabot. He does not believe in magic until Merlin casts a blizzard before him, thus allowing the wizard to educate Arthur in the castle, even though Ector has forbidden it. He is extremely distrustful of magic and Merlin, whom he mistakenly refers to as Marvin. When he first allows Merlin to educate Arthur, Ector forces Merlin to reside in an old, dilapidated tower near the castle, in hopes of making Merlin want to leave. Ector often treats Arthur harshly and possesses a clear authority over him, treating him more as a servant, while doting on his birth son, Kay. However, he does care for Arthur, as shown in his first scene, where he scolds Kay for allowing Arthur to go into the forest alone and worried that he might be dead. He also appoints him as Kay's squire, and clearly has affection for Arthur, and does not always want to treat him poorly, but rather feels responsible for his welfare. After Arthur is revealed as the rightful King of England by pulling the sword from the stone, he immediately apologizes to Arthur for how he has treated him up to that point and bows in submission while sternly ordering Kay to also bow down to Arthur.
- In the 1975 Monty Python parody, Monty Python and the Holy Grail, Sir Ector is named as one of the knights killed by the Rabbit of Caerbannog.
- In the 1981 film Excalibur, Sir Ector is portrayed by Clive Swift.
- In the 2005-2009 television series Kaamelott, Anton is a farmer portrayed by comedian Guy Bedos.
- In the 2011 television series Camelot, Sir Ector is portrayed by Sean Pertwee.
- In the 2020 television series Cursed, Sir Ector is portrayed by Peter Guinness.
