= Cold Pike =

Fell in the Lake District, Cumbria, England

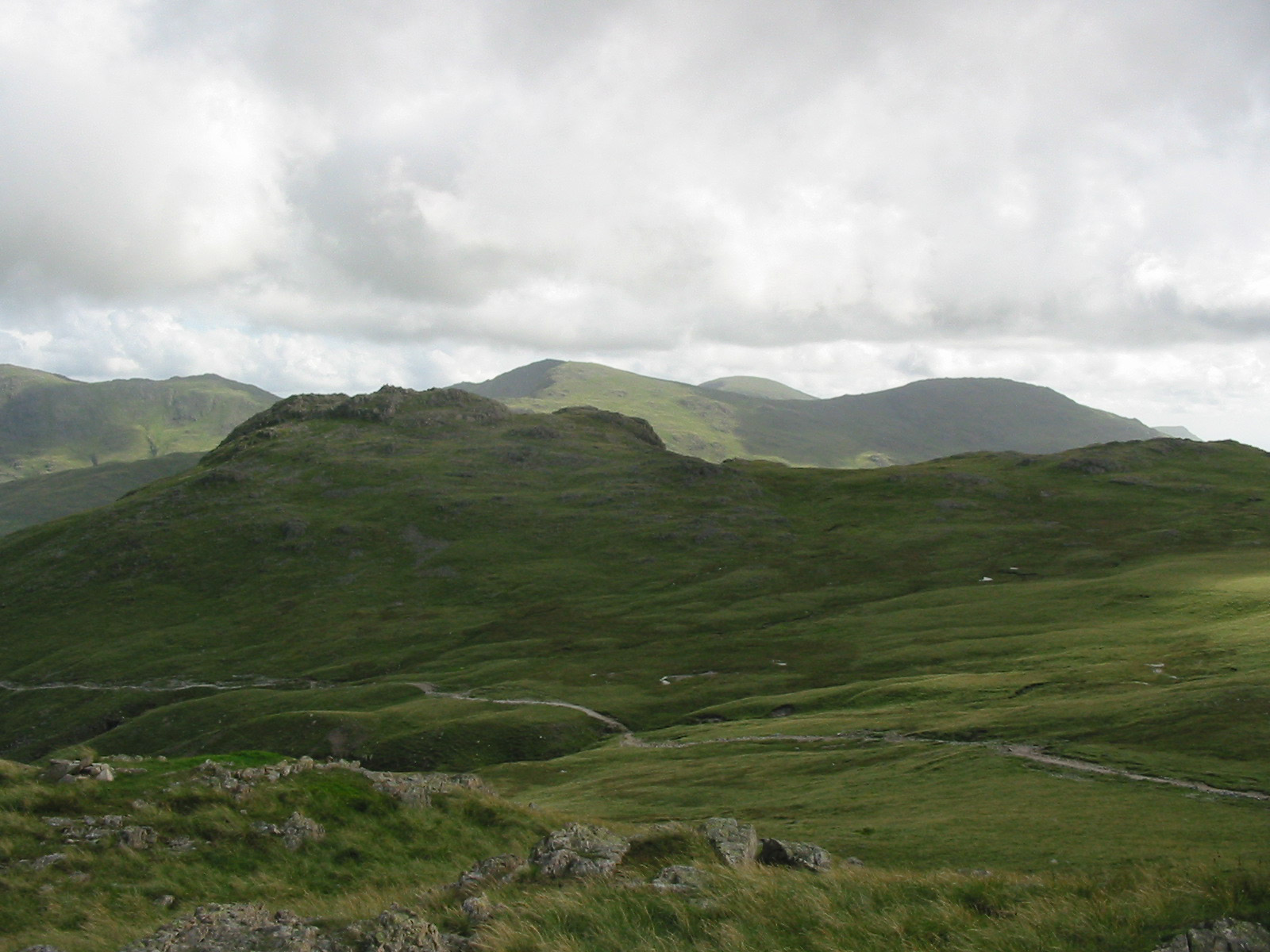
- Cold Pike from Great Knott

Highest point
- Elevation: 701 m (2,300 ft)
- Prominence: c. 46 m
- Parent peak: Crinkle Crags
- Listing: Hewitt, Nuttall, Wainwright
- Coordinates: 54°25′16″N 3°08′02″W

Geography
- Location within the Lake District Location within the former Borough of Copeland Location within the former South Lakeland district
- Location: Cumbria, England
- Parent range: Lake District, Southern Fells
- OS grid: NY262035
- Topo map: OS Landranger 90, Explorer OL6

Listed summits of Cold Pike
Name	Grid ref	Height	Status
Cold Pike West Top	NY258035	683 m (2,241 ft)	Nuttall
Cold Pike Far West Top	NY256037	670 m (2,200 ft)	Nuttall

Cold Pike is a fell in the English Lake District. It is a satellite of Crinkle Crags and stands above the Upper Duddon Valley.

== Topography ==
When travelling clockwise, Crinkle Crags is the last of the high cirque of fells forming the head of upper Eskdale. It sends out a trio of ridges to the south, running parallel like the prongs of a trident. Working from the west these ridges culminate in Hard Knott, Little Stand and Cold Pike. The Cold Pike ridge begins indistinctly in an area of rocky knolls and small tarns beneath the Fifth Crinkle. Gradually gaining definition it descends to a broad grassy saddle before rising again to the summit plateau of Cold Pike. To the north of the saddle is Great Knott at 2,283 feet (696 m). This top is considered by most guidebooks to be a subsidiary of Crinkle Crags rather than the nearer Cold Pike. Beyond the summit the ridge continues for another one-half mile (800 m) south eastward before falling steeply over the many tiered crags of Wrynose Breast.

Wrynose Breast stands above the nascent Duddon and the Wrynose Pass road, which provides the only vehicular link between central Lakeland and the Duddon Valley. Together with Hardknott Pass to the west, Wrynose is the latest incarnation of the Roman road from Ambleside to the port of Ravenglass.

To the west of Cold Pike is the Gaitscale Beck, the watercourse separating it from Little Stand. To the east across a wide low col is Pike of Blisco, a conical fell with its footing firmly in Langdale. The source of the River Duddon flows south from this col, curving westward around the foot of Wrynose Breast. To the north is Red Tarn, a feeder via Oxendale of Great Langdale Beck. Red Tarn is an elongated pool whose stony bed can be seen through clear shallow waters, reputed to hold trout. It forms a focal point for walkers as the wide path from the summit of Wrynose Pass down to Stool End runs beside it, a further path branching off across the outflow to Crinkle Crags.

== Geology ==
The fell top is composed of dacite lava flows with the volcaniclastic sandstones and tuffs of the Blisco Member outcropping to the south.

The main Red Tarn path was originally made to serve Red Crag Mine. This consists of a series of pits and trial borings for iron, concentrated about 300 yards (270 m) north of the tarn. It was worked from 1860 to 1875 but never achieved commercial success.

== Summit ==
The summit plateau of Cold Pike has three widely separated summits, all of which are listed as nuttalls. The lower two are unnamed on Ordnance Survey maps, but are generally referred to as Cold Pike West Top and Cold Pike Far West Top. The true summit is itself one of a series of three outcrops in a mild echoing of Crinkle Crags. Each has a cairn, the highest being a fine example. The top is an excellent place from which to survey Crinkle Crags, the Langdale Pikes, and the northern end of the Coniston Fells across Wrynose Bottom; there is a fine distant prospect of the Pennines above Windermere, and Morecambe Bay above the Duddon Valley.

- Panorama

== Ascents ==
Cold Pike can be reached easily via Red Tarn from the carpark at the summit of Wrynose Pass. It can also be climbed (less easily) from Great Langdale. More ‘honest’ walkers beginning in the south may wish to start from Little Langdale or Wrynose Bottom, first ascending Wrynose Pass. A direct route from Wrynose Bottom is also possible although pathless, skirting around the left of the crags. A consideration here is that the Duddon will need to be forded when starting out. Cold Pike is often seen as a worthwhile detour en route to Crinkle Crags.
