= Alaunus (disambiguation) =

Alaunus was a Gaulish god of medicine and prophesy. It may also refer to:

- Alaunus, the Roman name of the River Aulne in Brittany
- Alaunus, the Roman name of a river on Great Britain variously identified with the Aln or Allan

== See also ==
- Alauna (disambiguation)
- Alona (disambiguation)
