= Wasdale, Eskdale and Duddon =

Aggregation of National Trust land in Cumbria, England

Coordinates: 54.425°N 3.349°W

Wasdale, Eskdale and Duddon is a term previously used by the National Trust to refer to an area of protected countryside held by them: it is part of the Lake District, located in south-western Cumbria, England.

== Wasdale ==
In Wasdale, the National Trust owns both the country's highest mountain, Scafell Pike, as well as its deepest lake, Wastwater. The majority of the surrounding mountains also belong to the Trust, including Great Gable. Further down the valley is the wooded and tranquil Nether Wasdale Estate.

== Eskdale ==
In nearby Eskdale, the National Trust owns over 70 square kilometres (27 mile²) and eleven farms are protected with extensive areas of fell and Hardknott Roman Fort, which is maintained by English Heritage.

== Duddon ==
In the Duddon Valley the Trust oversees almost 30 square kilometres (12 mile²) and nine farms.
