= Phobia (disambiguation) =

A phobia is an extreme or irrational fear of an object or situation.

Phobia may also refer to:

- -phobia, about the suffixes -phobia, -phobic, -phobe

== Film ==
- Phobia (1980 film), a Canadian film directed by John Huston
- Phobia (1988 film), an Australian film by John Dingwall
- Phobia (2008 film), or 4bia, a Thai horror film also known as 4bia
- Phobia (2013 film), an American independent horror film
- Phobia (2016 film), an Indian psychological thriller film
- Phobias (film), a 2021 American anthology horror film

== Music ==
- Phobia (band), an American grindcore band
- Phobia (Breaking Benjamin album), 2006
- Phobia (The Kinks album) or the title song, 1993
- ...Phobia, an album by Benassi Bros., 2005
- Phobia, an album by Torture Killer, 2013
- "Phobias" (song), by Johnny Orlando, 2020
- "Phobia", a song by Flowered Up, 1990
- "Phobia", a song by HRVY, 2017
- "Phobia", a song by Kreator from Outcast, 1997
- "Phobia", a song by Nothing But Thieves from Moral Panic, 2020

== Other ==
- Phobia (comics), a supervillain in the DC Comics universe
- Phobia (manga), a Japanese manga series

== See also ==
- Irrational fear (disambiguation)
