= Eskdale, Cumbria =

Civil parish in Cumbria, England

Coordinates: 54.3912°N 3.2663°W

Eskdale
- Civil parish
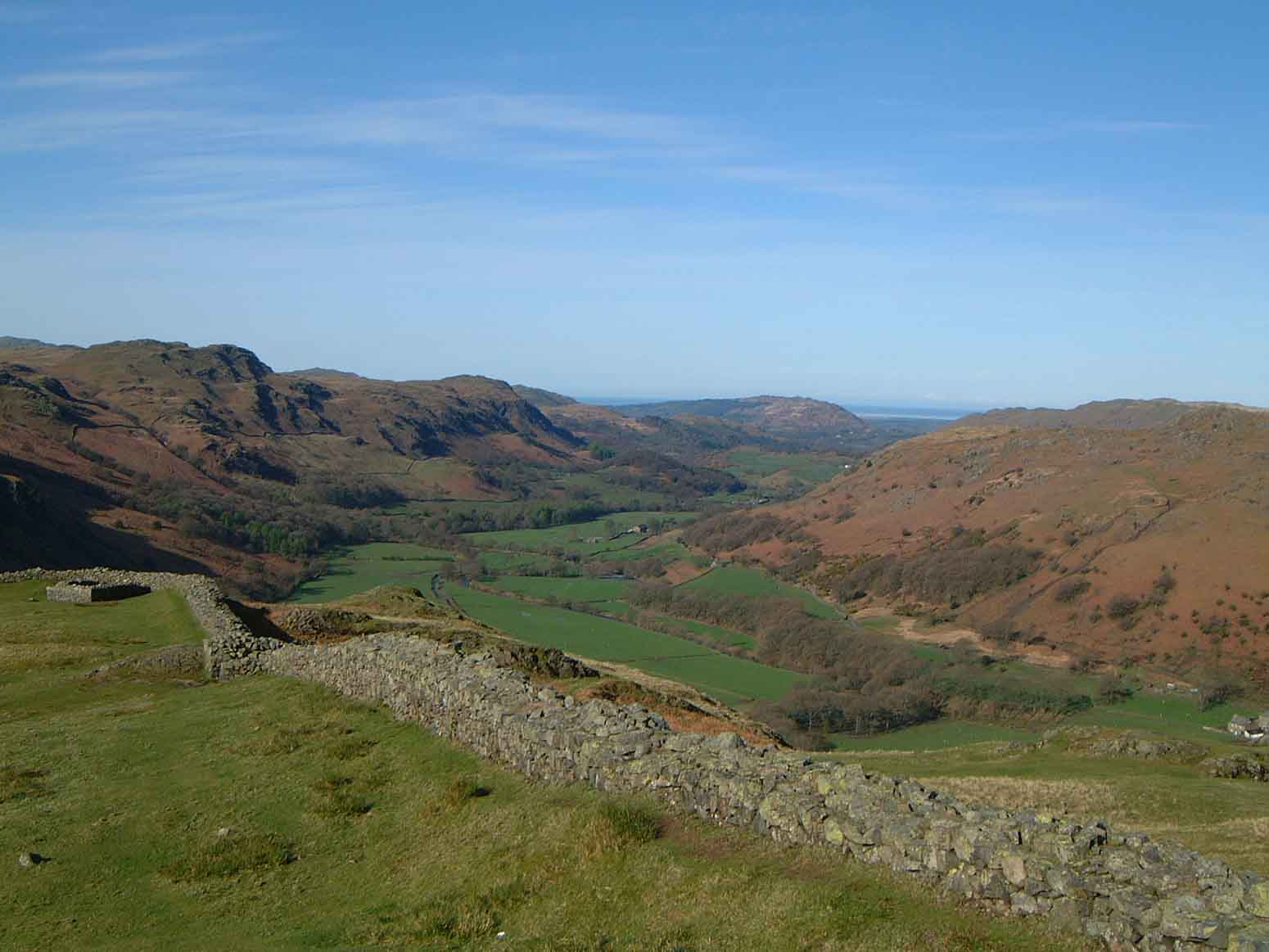
- The panorama across Eskdale from Hardknott Roman Fort

- Location within Cumbria
- Population: 249 (Parish, 2021)
- OS grid reference: NY1700
- Civil parish: Eskdale
- Unitary authority: Cumberland
- Ceremonial county: Cumbria
- Region: North West
- Country: England
- Sovereign state: United Kingdom
- Post town: HOLMROOK
- Postcode district: CA19
- Dialling code: 019467
- Police: Cumbria
- Fire: Cumbria
- Ambulance: North West
- UK Parliament: Barrow and Furness

Eskdale is a civil parish in the west of the Lake District National Park, and the Cumberland district of Cumbria, England. It is named after the Eskdale valley which the River Esk flows through on its way from the fells of the Lake District to the Irish Sea at Ravenglass. The civil parish is not coterminous with the valley, as the parish also includes the upper valley of the River Mite (Miterdale), whilst the lower reaches of the River Esk are in the civil parish of Muncaster. Most of the parish's population is concentrated in the two villages of Eskdale Green and Boot.

One of the Lake District's most popular tourist attractions, the Ravenglass and Eskdale Railway, runs through the parish, though along with other western parts of the Lake District, Eskdale is notably quieter during the high summer season than the more accessible eastern areas.

== History ==
The Romans built a road which ran along Eskdale, linking the port at Ravenglass to the west with their fort at Ambleside to the east. At the eastern end of the Eskdale valley, the road crossed Hardknott Pass. Around 117 AD, they built a fort called Mediobogdum part way up the pass, on a prominent vantage point for views west along the valley. The fort had been abandoned by the end of the 2nd century, and its remains are now known as Hardknott Roman Fort.

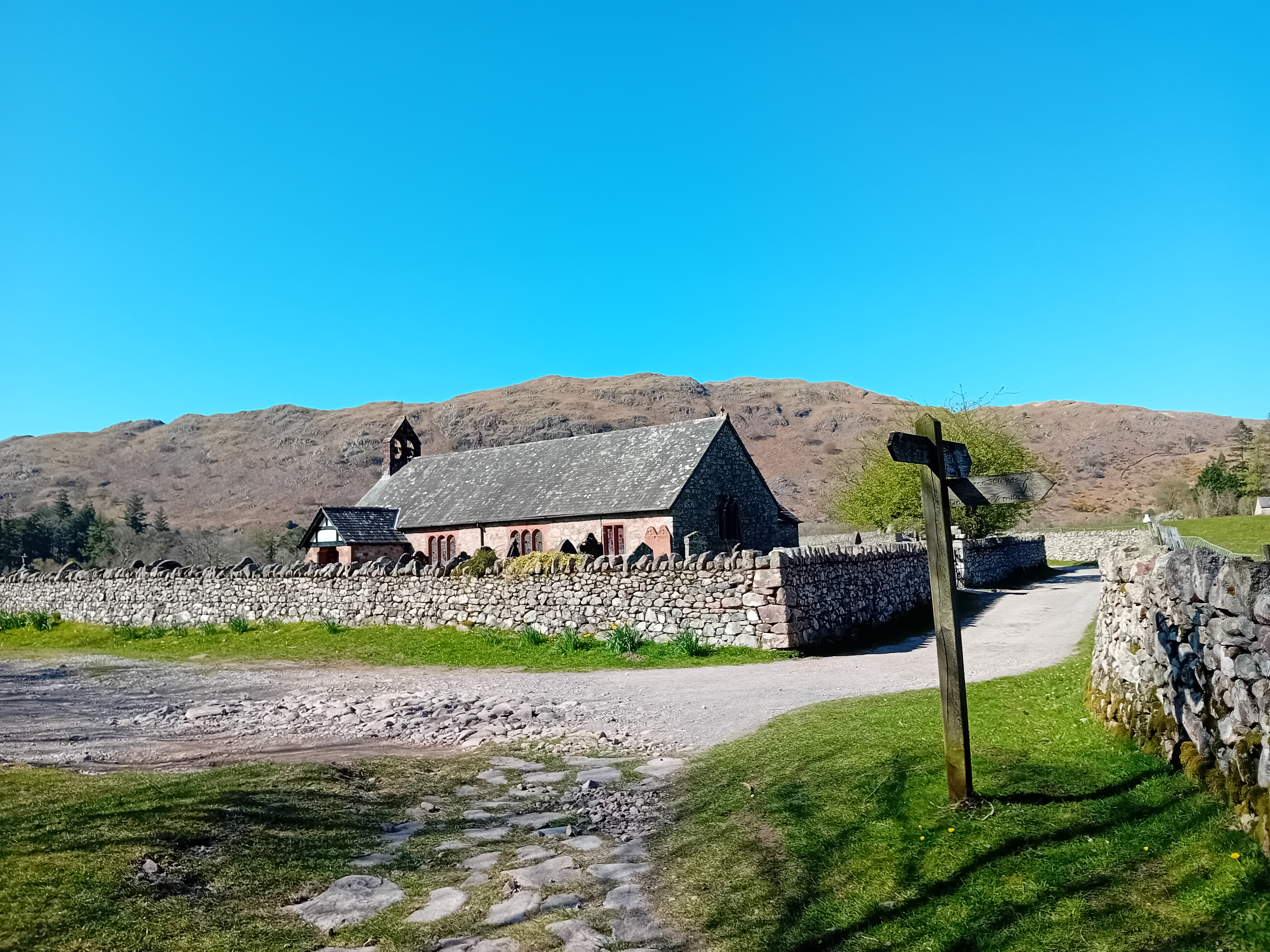
St Catherine's Church

The valley has been relatively sparsely populated for most of its history. The River Esk formed the boundary between the ancient parishes of St Bees to the north and Millom to the south. St Catherine's Church was built in the 14th century on the north bank of the Esk near Boot, to serve as a chapel of ease to the parish church at St Bees, some 14 miles (23 km) away.

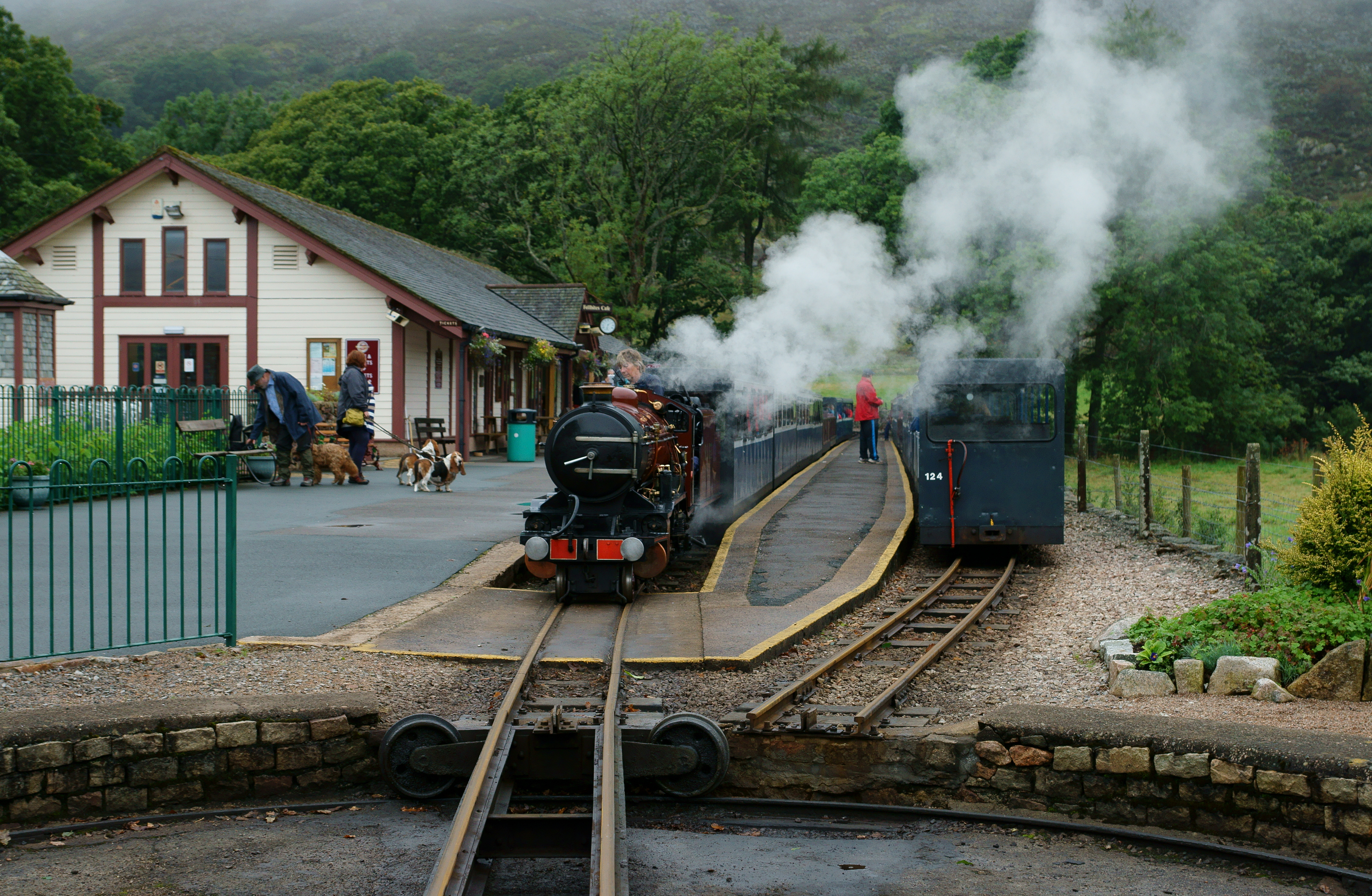
Dalegarth railway station, eastern terminus of the Ravenglass and Eskdale Railway

In the 19th century, there were a number of hematite iron ore quarries in the valley, mostly in the area around Boot. The Ravenglass and Eskdale Railway was opened in 1875 as a 3 ft narrow-gauge railway to transport iron ore quarried in Eskdale to the main line of the Furness Railway at Ravenglass. It also started carrying passengers the following year. As quarrying in the valley declined, the line became uneconomic and closed in 1913. It was bought in 1915 by model-makers and the track re-laid to a fifteen-inch gauge. From the 1920s to the 1950s the line's main commercial function was carrying granite from quarries around Beckfoot. After the granite quarries closed in 1953, the line again became unviable as a commercial enterprise. In 1960 it was bought by a preservation society, since when it has been run as a heritage railway.

On 2 June 2010, the area was the scene of some of the Cumbria shootings perpetrated by 52-year-old taxi driver Derrick Bird, who shot and killed twelve people and wounded eleven others. Several of the wounded victims were shot in Eskdale and the surrounding area.

== Governance ==
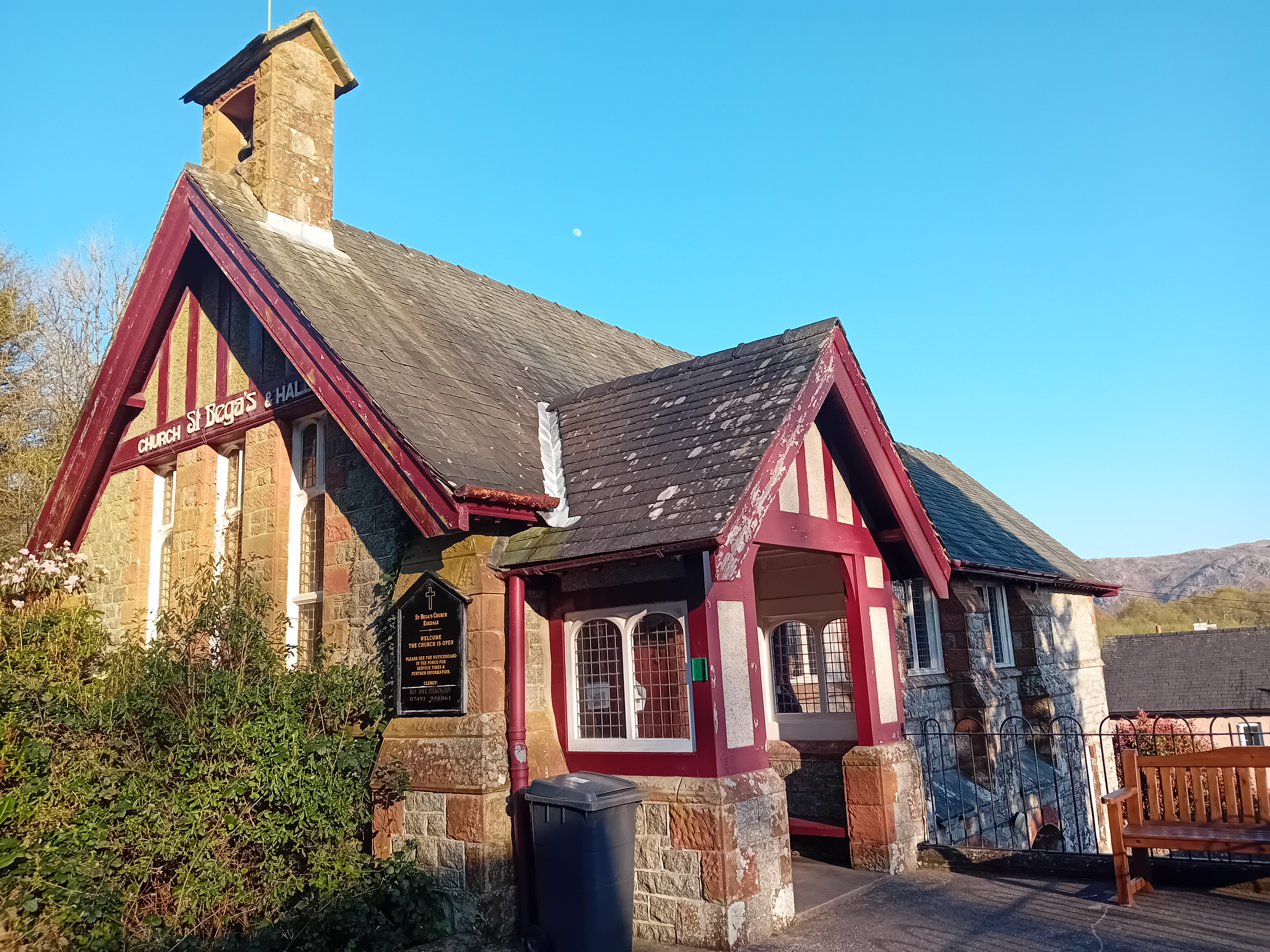
Church of St Bega at Eskdale Green, with village hall on lower ground floor below the church

There are two tiers of local government covering Eskdale, at parish and unitary authority level: Eskdale Parish Council and Cumberland Council. The parish council generally meets at the village hall at Eskdale Green, which forms part of the same building as St Bega's Church. The parish is wholly within the Lake District National Park, and so some functions are administered by the Lake District National Park Authority, notably planning.

At a national level, the parish is within the Barrow and Furness UK parliamentary constituency.

=== Administrative history ===
The area of the modern parish historically straddled the township of 'Eskdale and Wasdale' in the parish of St Bees (north of the Esk), and the township of 'Birker and Austhwaite' in the parish of Millom (south of the Esk). (Note: Austhwaite is no longer in use as a place name, but in medieval times Austhwaite Hall was a peel tower which stood near the south bank of the Esk, probably in the vicinity of the modern Dalegarth Hall.) The Eskdale and Wasdale township also included the Wasdale Head area to the north of Eskdale itself. Both parishes formed part of the historic county of Cumberland. Each township took on civil functions under the poor laws from the 17th century onwards, and as such both townships also became civil parishes in 1866, when the legal definition of 'parish' was changed to be the areas used for administering the poor laws.

In 1934, Eskdale and Wasdale ceded the Wasdale Head area to the parish of Nether Wasdale (renamed Wasdale in 2000) and the remainder was merged with Birker and Austhwaite to become a new civil parish called Eskdale. From 1934 to 1974, the parish of Eskdale formed part of the Millom Rural District. In 1974, Eskdale became part of the Borough of Copeland in the new county of Cumbria. Copeland was abolished in 2023 when the new Cumberland Council was created, also taking over the functions of the abolished Cumbria County Council in the area.

Between 1934 and 2009, the northern boundary of Eskdale parish ran along the southern banks of Wast Water and over Lingmell. The parish boundary between Eskdale and Wasdale was adjusted in 2009 to follow the watershed between Wasdale to the north and Eskdale and Miterdale to the south. As such, the parish boundary now passes over the summits of Illgill Head, Scafell and Scafell Pike, the latter being the highest mountain in England.

== Literature ==
In a note to her poetical illustration Eskdale, Cumberland. (Fisher's Drawing Room Scrap Book, 1836) to a painting by G. Pickering, Letitia Elizabeth Landon remarks on the hospitality of the 'estatesmen' of this district.

Eskdale and Rafnglass (modern Ravenglass) feature in Rosemary Sutcliff's final novel Sword Song, set in the 9th century and published posthumously in 1997.

== Demography ==
At the 2021 census, the parish had a population of 249. The population had been 264 in 2001, and 304 in 2011.

== Transport ==
As of March 2026 the parish has no bus or train routes serving it.

== See also ==
- Listed buildings in Eskdale, Cumbria
