= Cohors IV Delmatarum =

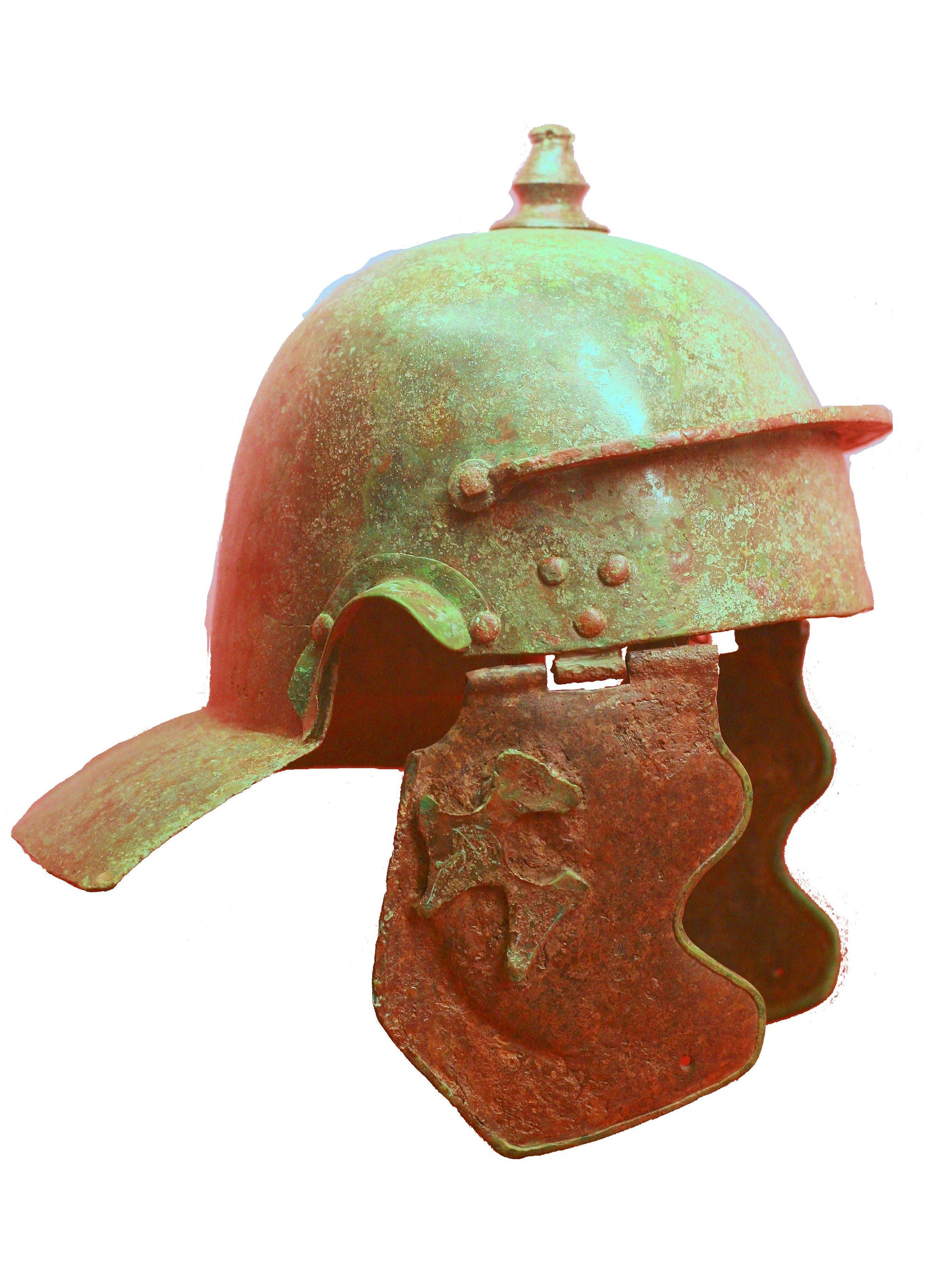
- Roman infantry helmet (late 1st century)
- Active: early 1st century to at least early 2nd century
- Country: Roman Empire
- Type: Roman auxiliary cohort
- Role: infantry
- Size: 480 men
- Garrison/HQ: Britannia 103-126

Cohors quarta Delmatarum ("4th Cohort of Dalmatae") was a Roman auxiliary infantry regiment raised in the 1st century AD and continuing to serve into the 2nd century.

== The Dalmatae ==
The cohort is named after the Dalmatae, an Illyrian-speaking tribe that inhabited the Adriatic coastal mountain range of the eponymous Dalmatia. The ancient geographer Strabo describes these mountains as extremely rugged, and the Dalmatae as backwards and warlike. He claims they did not use money long after their neighbours adopted it and that they "made war on the Romans for a long time". He also criticises the Dalmatae, a nation of pastoralists, for turning fertile plains into sheep pasture. Indeed, the name of the tribe itself is believed to mean "shepherds", derived from the Illyrian word delme ("sheep"). The final time these people fought against Rome was in the Illyrian revolt of 6-9 AD. Dalmatae auxiliary forces started the revolt and soon spread throughout Dalmatia and Pannonia. The resulting war was described by the Roman writer Suetonius as the most difficult faced by Rome since the Punic Wars two centuries earlier. But after the war, the Dalmatae became a loyal and important source of recruits for the Roman army.

== Origins and service history ==
According to Holder, 12 cohortes Delmatarum appear to have been raised after the suppression of the Illyrian revolt in two series, of 7 and 5 respectively. All these units existed by the time of Emperor Claudius (r. 41-54). Of these, 9 appear to have survived into the 2nd century.

The regiment was probably raised by founder-emperor Augustus (r. 30BC-14AD) after 9 AD. It was certainly in existence by the time of Claudius (r. 41-54). Its early movements are unknown. Holder suggests that the regiment may have taken part in the Roman invasion of Britain (43) or the suppression of the revolt of Boudicca in 61. However, this ignores the evidence of three 1st-century tombstones from the Rhine forts of Bingen and Bingerbrück in Germania, where it was stationed. The regiment first appears in the datable epigraphic record in 103, in Britannia. It was still there in 126-30, the time of its last datable inscription, a building inscription at the Roman fort of Hardknott (Cumbria). The latter is incomplete but is plausibly not conclusively attributed to IV Delmatarum. The regiment's disappearance from the epigraphic record in the early 2nd century has led Spaul to suggest that the regiment was merged with another to form the cohors I Pannoniorum et Delmatarum equitata c.R. attested in Germania Inferior in 127 and beyond. However, the record overall is too incomplete to support any firm conclusions.

== Known personnel ==
The names of three praefecti (regimental commanders) are attested. Titus Iunius Severus was a Spaniard from Denia. A second man, whose middle name only, Pactumerius, has survived, left a votive stone at Madaura in Numidia (Mdaurusch, Algeria). The origin of the third, Lucius Aprius Liburnus, is revealed by his cognomen (third name): of the Liburni tribe, western neighbors of the Dalmatae. In addition, the names of three caligati (common soldiers) survive on the 1st-century tombstones from Bingen. All were Illyrians: one Dalmata, one Liburnus and one Daverzus.

== See also ==
- List of Roman auxiliary regiments
