= Alona =

Alona may refer to:

- Alona, Cyprus, a village in the Nicosia District
- Alona, Greece, a village in Florina regional unit
- Alona or Alone, another name for Alavana, the Roman settlement at Watercrook
- Alona (crustacean), a large genus of Cladocera
- Alona (plant), a genus in the plant family Solanaceae
- Alona (given name), a given name (including a list of people with the name)
- Alona Beach, a beach resort area of Panglao, Bohol, Philippines
- Alona Regional Council, a regional council in northern Israel
- 15230 Alona, a main belt asteroid discovered on September 13, 1987

== See also ==
- Alauna (disambiguation)
