= The God Machine (band) =

English alternative rock band

- The God Machine, 1992

Background information
- Origin: San Diego, California, U.S.
- Genres: Alternative rock, grunge, alternative metal
- Years active: 1990–1995
- Labels: Fiction, Eve, Polydor
- Members: Robin Proper-Sheppard; Jimmy Fernandez; Austin Lynn Austin

The God Machine was an English alternative rock band, active in 1990s. Its members were all from San Diego, California, but they all lived and performed mainly in the United Kingdom and across Europe.

The band consisted of three members from San Diego, Robin Proper-Sheppard (guitar/vocals), Jimmy Fernandez (bass) and Ronald Austin aka Austin Lynn Austin (drums), and they first performed officially under the name The God Machine in 1991. They released an EP, Purity with the Eve record label, and were later given a recording contract with Fiction Records. They released two albums in their career, both with their trademark dark and industrial-sounding alternative rock, before Fernandez suddenly died from brain hemorrhage. Their single release of "Home", peaked at No. 65 in the UK Singles Chart in January 1993. Proper-Sheppard went on to form The Flower Shop Recordings label, and bands Sophia and The May Queens. In 2020, after nearly three decades, Austin formed and launched his own music project, Mercylane.

Their second album, One Last Laugh in a Place of Dying, was recognized by Alternative Press as one of the "90 greatest albums of the 90s" (#88) in their December 1998 issue. Welsh rock band Liberty 37 named their second and final album after the band.

Their earlier San Diego incarnation was called Society Line, and also featured guitarist Albert Amman, who left the band before its move to London.

== Discography ==
=== Studio albums ===
- Scenes from the Second Storey (Fiction Records, 1993) – UK No. 55
- One Last Laugh in a Place of Dying (Fiction Records, 1994) – UK No. 100

=== EPs/singles ===
- Purity EP (Eve Recordings, 1991)
  - 12", featuring "Home", "The Blind Man" and "Purity". These were the original versions and were subsequently re-recorded for the scenes from the second storey album
- The Desert Song EP (Fiction Records, 1992)
  - CD and 12", featuring "The Desert Song", "Prostitute", "Commitment" and "Pictures Of A Bleeding Boy". The title track was the original version of the song and was subsequently re-recorded for the scenes from the second storey album, sounding significantly different from the version here. The three B-sides were not available on any album
- Ego (Fiction Records, 1992)
  - CD and 12", featuring "Ego", "Temptation" (The Experimental Zen Mix) and "The Piano Song". The two B-sides were extended versions of the tracks available in shorter form on scenes from the second storey
- Home (Fiction Records, 1993)
  - 7" silver vinyl, featuring "Home" (edit) and "What Time Is Love?" (a cover version of The KLF). The B-side was not available on any album
  - CD, featuring "Home", "Double Dare" (BBC radio session, a cover version of Bauhaus), "All My Colours" (a cover version of Echo & the Bunnymen) and "Fever" (a cover version of Peggy Lee). The three B-sides were not available on any album
  - 12", featuring "Home", "All My Colours", "Train" (a cover version of The Morlocks) and "Fever". The three B-sides were not available on any album
  - Promo-CD, featuring "Home" (edit), "Home", and "What Time Is Love?". The latter B-side was not available on any album
  - Promo-CD, featuring "Home" (live), "Pictures Of A Bleeding Boy", "Commitment" (BBC radio session) and "Fever". None of these tracks were available on any album

=== Compilation appearances ===
- Independent 20 (compilation CD) featuring "Home" (original pre-album version from Purity EP) (Beechwood Music, 1992)
- Maximum Bliss (Select magazine sampler cassette) featuring "She Said" (demo) (Fiction Records, 1992)
- Hybrid (sampler CD) featuring "The Desert Song" (original pre-album version from The Desert Song EP) (Fiction Records, 1992)
- Bilag Til Rock Furore 22 (Rock Furore magazine sampler CD) featuring "Commitment" (BBC radio session) (Rock Furore, 1993)
- In A Field Of Their Own Volume 2 – Glastonbury 93 (NME live compilation CD) featuring "She Said" (live) (NME, 1993)
- The Lost Weekend (compilation 12" vinyl) featuring "Pictures Of A Bleeding Boy" (Blast First, 1993)
- Love Bites (compilation 10" vinyl, 2nd in the series of "The Kennel Club" record releases) featuring "The Devil Song" (alternative version) (Blue Eyed Dog Records / RTM, 1994)

=== B-sides / rare tracks ===
- Home (original pre-album version)
- The Blind Man (original pre-album version)
- Purity (original pre-album version)
- The Desert Song (original pre-album version)
- Prostitute
- Commitment
- Pictures of a Bleeding Boy
- Temptation (The Experimental Zen Mix)
- The Piano Song (extended version)
- What Time Is Love? (The KLF cover)
- Double Dare (BBC radio session, Bauhaus cover)
- All My Colours (Echo & the Bunnymen cover)
- Fever (Peggy Lee cover)
- Train (The Morlocks cover)
- Home (live)
- She Said (demo)
- Commitment (BBC radio session)
- She Said (live)
- The Devil Song (alternative version)
