= Hardknott Pass =

Hill pass in the Lake District, Cumbria, England

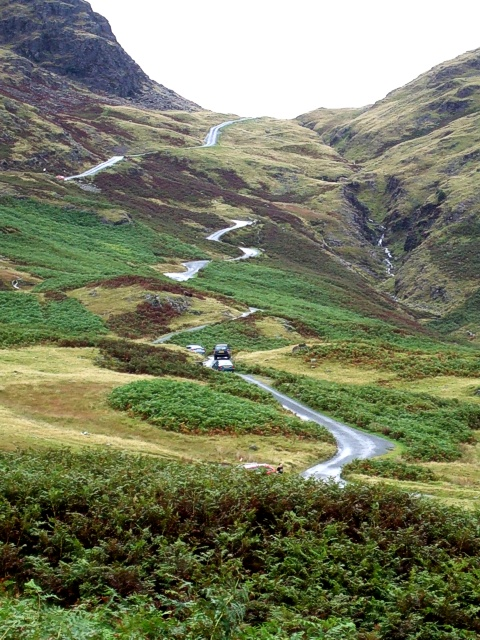
- Hardknott Pass from Hardknott Roman Fort
- Interactive map of Hardknott Pass
- Elevation: 393 m (1,289 ft)
- Traversed by: Eskdale - Duddon road

Location
- Location: Lake District National Park, Cumbria
- Range: Cumbrian Mountains
- Coordinates: 54.40269°N 3.197118°W

Hardknott Pass is a hill pass between Eskdale and the Duddon Valley in the Lake District National Park, Cumbria, England. The tarmac-surfaced road, which is the most direct route from the central Lake District to West Cumbria, shares the title of steepest road in England with Rosedale Chimney Bank in North Yorkshire. It has a maximum gradient of 1 in 3 (about 33%).

The pass takes its name from the nearby Hard Knott fell, whose name is derived from the Old Norse harthr (hard) and knutr (craggy hill).

== Geography ==
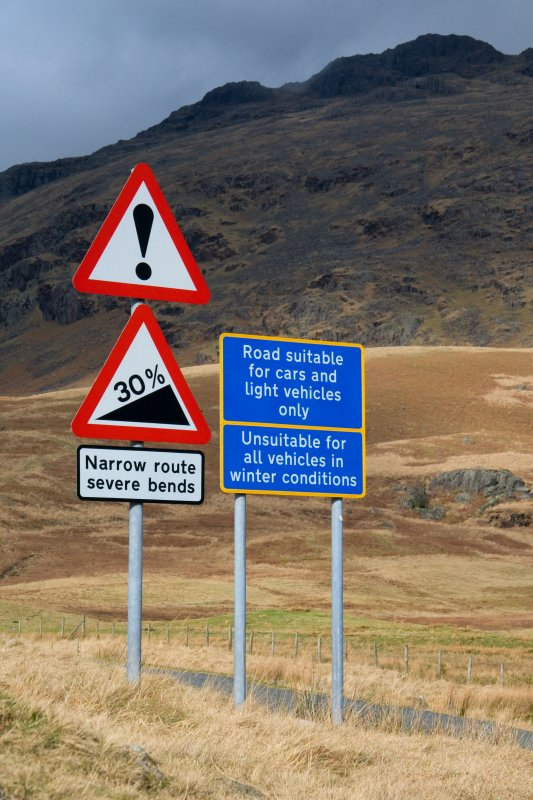
A road sign warning drivers about the extreme gradient.

A single track road runs between Eskdale in the west to the edge of the neighbouring Wrynose Pass in the east. On the western side is Harter Fell and the remains of Hardknott Roman Fort (200 metres (660 ft) above sea level).

The Hardknott Pass stands at a maximum elevation of 393 m (1,289 ft). The road descends steeply at a gradient of 30% (1 in 3) into the Duddon Valley. At the eastern end of the pass is Cockley Beck farm, built in the 1860s and owned by the National Trust. The route from Hardknott leads eastward towards the Wrynose Pass and Ambleside.

The pass is described as one of the most challenging roads in Britain. A series of hairpin bends make visibility difficult in various places, and the road surface is in poor condition and slippery when wet. The pass is often closed in winter due to ice that makes the route impassable for vehicles. Traffic ascending the pass has priority as advised by the Highway Code.

The challenging 1 in 3 gradients, steeper than the mountain stages of European bicycle races including the Tour de France and the Giro d'Italia, draw endurance cyclists. It is part of the annual Fred Whitton Challenge, a 112-mile (180 km) ride around the Lake District. An "average" cyclist who was trained over six weeks for a 2019 Eurosport documentary called England's Toughest Climb failed to complete the route.

== History ==
A road over the pass was built by the Romans around AD 110 to link the coastal fort and baths at Ravenglass with their garrisons at Ambleside and Kendal. The Romans called this road the Tenth Highway. The road fell into disrepair after the Romans left Britain in the early 5th century, becoming an unpaved packhorse route used to transport lead and agricultural goods. By the early Middle Ages, it was known as the Waingate ("cart road") or Wainscarth ("cart pass"): there is an 1138 record of a party of monks traversing it in an oxcart. Hardknott pass and its surrounding area fell within the domain of the Lords of Millom, being situated between the headwaters of the Esk and Duddon. Grazing and hunting rights were given to the monks of Furness Abbey by the Lords of Millom in the 13th century, which they held until the Dissolution of the Monasteries (1536–41).

In the 1880s an association of hoteliers, the English Lake District Association, financed improvements to the road in the hope of encouraging tourist excursions by carriage; by 1891 the scheme was judged to be "not the success that was anticipated". Nevertheless, the route had some popularity with cyclists and early motorists, with the Cyclists' Touring Club 1911 Guide to North-West England describing the old coach road as "difficult going West, cruel coming East". The first motor vehicles were taken over the Hardknott and Wrynose passes, from the Eskdale side, in 1913.

In 1936, the Cumberland Highways Committee considered, and rejected, a proposal to make the pass more accessible to motorised vehicles by laying down a new road surface and making other improvements. However, during the Second World War the War Office used the area for tank training, completely destroying the existing road surface. After the war the damage was repaired and the road tarmaced. A decade after the local government had rejected opening the highway to vehicles, the war's legacy had inadvertently created a direct motor route between Ambleside and Eskdale for the first time.

The courses of the Roman and modern roads are not identical. The Roman highway is to the north of the modern road on the western side of the pass and to the south on the eastern side.

== See also ==
- List of hill passes of the Lake District
