= Hardknott Roman Fort =

Archeological site in Cumbria, England

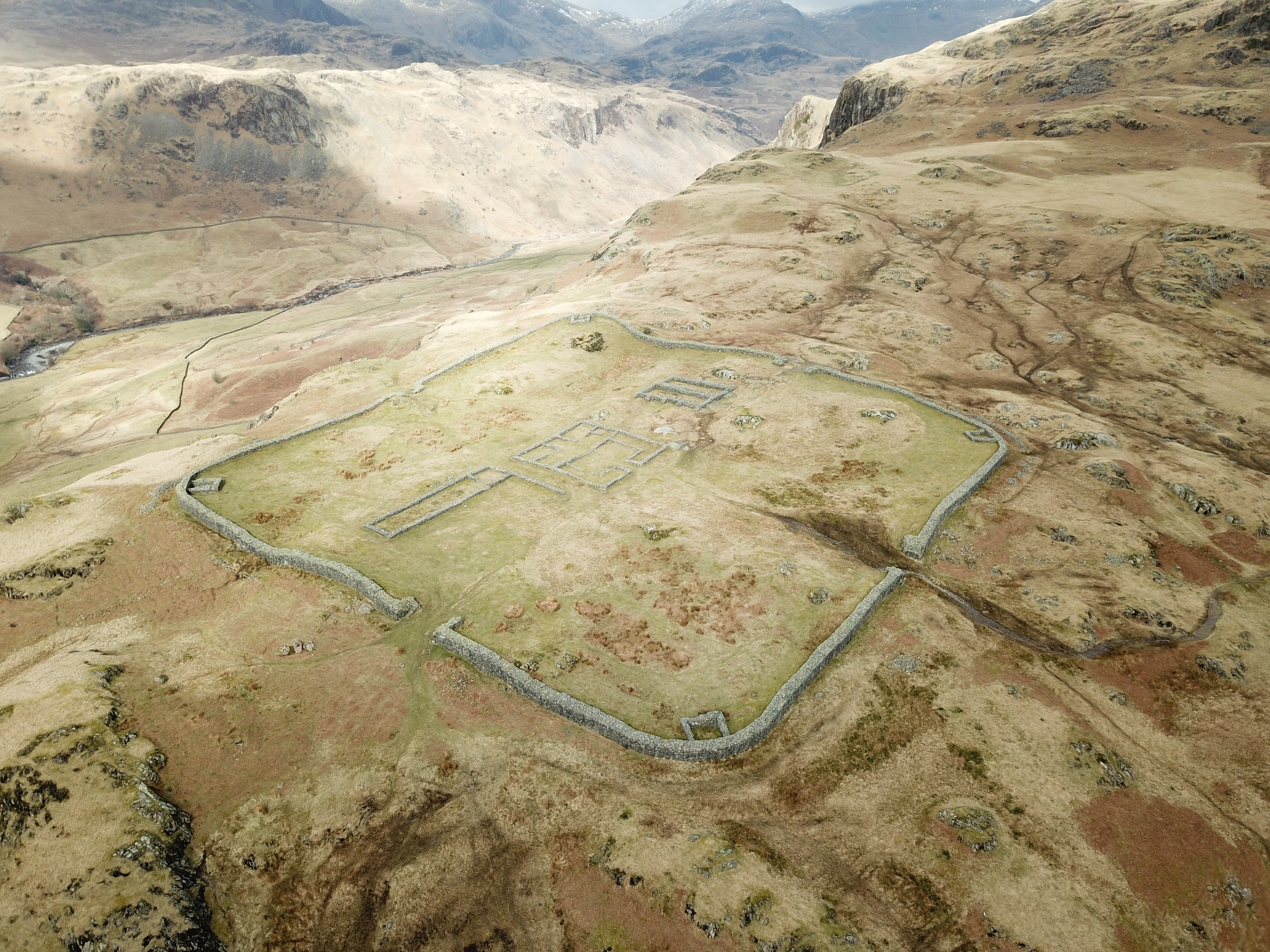
- Hardknott Roman Fort; its parade ground is the flat area at top right

- Location within Cumbria
- 54°24′10″N 3°12′19″W
- Type: Castrum
- Location: Cumbria, England
- Region: Britannia

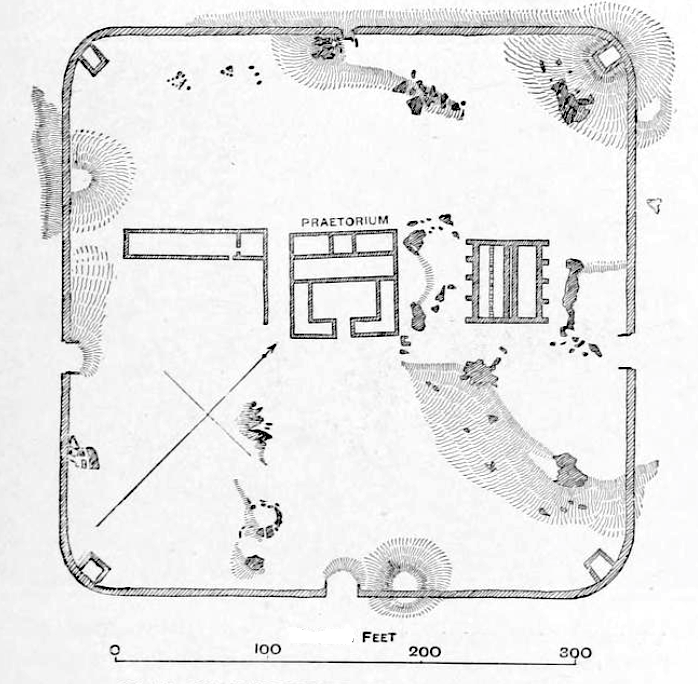
Hardknott Roman Fort. Its granary at right can be identified by its external buttresses.

Hardknott Roman Fort is an archeological site, the remains of the Roman fort Mediobogdum, located on the western side of the challenging Hardknott Pass in the English Lake District. The fort was built between 120 and 138 on a rocky spur, and was initially garrisoned by a detachment of the Cohors IV Delmatarum from the Dalmatian coast (in modern Croatia). It was abandoned around a decade later, then reoccupied circa 200 and remained in use for much of the next two centuries.

The fort is on land owned by the National Trust, part of the Trust's Wasdale, Eskdale and Duddon property, and is maintained by English Heritage. It is in the civil parish of Eskdale, the unitary authority area of Cumberland, and the ceremonial county of Cumbria.

== Location and name ==
The fort was built on a rocky spur giving a superb view over the River Esk in both upper and lower Eskdale, and protecting Hardknott Pass. At an altitude of 800 feet, it isn't the highest fort in the Roman province of Britannia, the highest fort is Epiacum or Whitley Castle, just over the border from Cumbria in Northumberland, at an altitude of 1,050 feet.

The ruins have been commonly known in recent times as Hardknott Fort or Hardknott Castle, but are identified from the Ravenna Cosmography as the Mediobogdum fort, situated along the Roman road between the forts of Galava at Ambleside to the east, and Glannoventa on the coast at Ravenglass to the west.

== History ==
Built between about 120 and 138, the fort was abandoned during the Antonine advance into Scotland during the mid-2nd century. The fort was reoccupied around 200 and continued in use until the last years of the 4th century. During this time, an extensive vicus developed outside the fort. The initial Roman garrison here was a detachment of 500 infantry of the Cohors IV Delmatarum from the Dalmatian coast.

Leather objects from Roman occupation have been found at the site. A 1965 excavation found a piece of leather near the granary, thought to be part of soldier's jerkin. Another excavation in 1968 by Dorothy Charlesworth and J. H. Thornton uncovered more leather, including several shoes.

== Layout ==
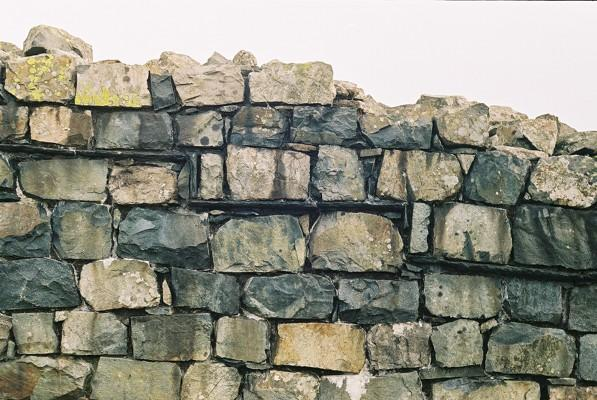
On many walls a slate layer demarcates original Roman construction (below) and modern reconstruction (above)

The fort is square with rounded corners, 114 metres long externally, or 105 metres internally, the rampart wall being about 1.7 metres thick with ditches adding to the total width of the rampart. The low walls of the fort were "restored" some years ago, a slate course showing the height of the walls before their rebuilding.

The outer wall has four gates, at the centre of each side, and lookout towers at each corner. Within the walls are the remaining outlines of several buildings: two side-by-side granaries, the garrison headquarters building and garrison commander's villa, or Praetorium. In addition to these stone buildings, long-lost timber structures would have housed barracks for the mounted auxilia.

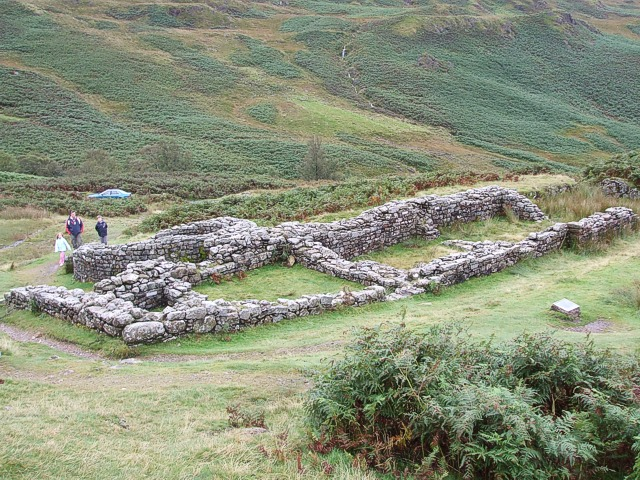
The Roman bath house at Hardknott, outside and below the fort perimeter to the southwest. The car shows the proximity of the modern road.

Outside the square of the fort are the remains of the bath house below it (which has a rare circular sudatorium or sweating room), and the levelled parade ground above it, which is considered to be the finest surviving example in England.

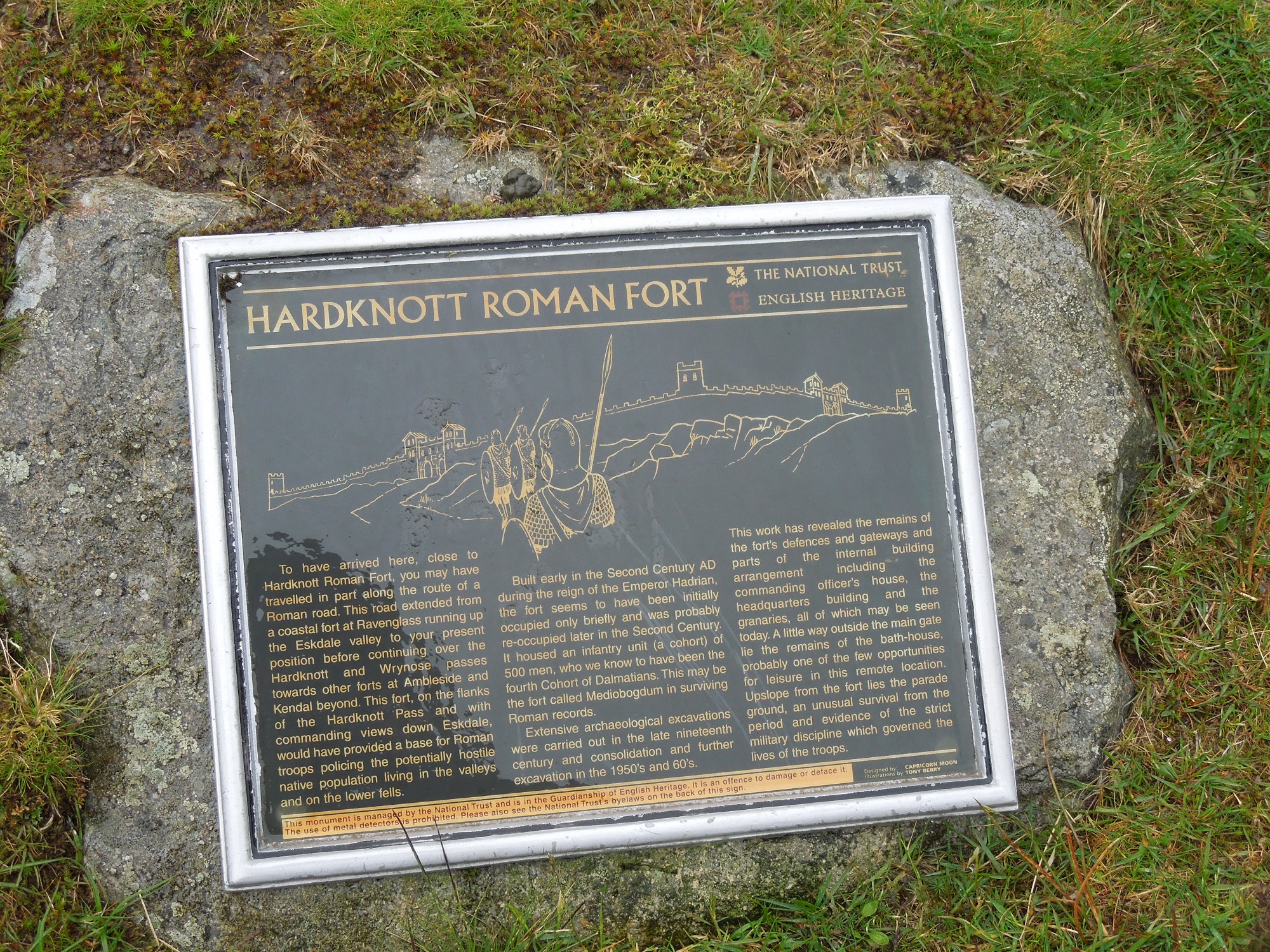
Information sign at Hardknott

The parade ground is approximately two hundred yards higher up the slope to the east of the fort. A track led up to it from the East Gate of the fort. A plan of the fort by R. G. Collingwood in 1930 shows the parade ground to have been as big as the fort, with embanked edges to ensure a level surface. The English Heritage online 'History of Hardknott Roman Fort' suggests that the parade ground would have been large enough to train horses there (cf. 'External links' below).

== Cultural influence ==
- Hardknott is the eponymous fort in the Jack Whyte novel, The Fort at River's Bend.
- The fort also features in Spain 1937 by W.H. Auden; as well as in the 17th River Duddon sonnet by Wordsworth, where it is described as "that lone Camp on Hardknott's height,/Whose guardians bent the knee to Jove and Mars".
- The fort is featured in the first chapter of Geoffrey Trease's young adult novel, Word to Caesar (1955), a story set circa year 117
