= Scenes from the Second Storey =

Studio album by the God Machine
- Released: 1993
- Recorded: 1992
- Genre: Alternative rock; alternative metal; grunge; psychedelic rock
- Length: 77:53
- Label: Fiction / Polydor
- Producer: The God Machine

The God Machine chronology
Scenes from the Second Storey (1993)	One Last Laugh in a Place of Dying (1994)

Scenes from the Second Storey is the debut album by American rock band the God Machine, released in 1993 by Fiction Records and Polydor. It peaked at number 55 on the UK Albums Chart.

The album opens with a sample from the film adaptation of The Sheltering Sky (the same sample also opens Neurosis' Enemy of the Sun, an album released in the same year as Scenes from the Second Storey), while the single "Home" contains an intro consisting of the beginning of the track "Pilentze Pee" by the Bulgarian State Television Female Vocal Choir from the album Le Mystère des Voix Bulgares. "Home" peaked at number 65 on the UK Singles Chart in January 1993.

== Critical reception ==
Professional ratings
Review scores
Source	Rating
AllMusic	3/5 stars
NME	8/10
Q	3/5 stars
Rock Hard	8/10
Select	5/5
Sputnikmusic	4.7/5

In 2005, Scenes from the Second Storey was ranked number 312 in Rock Hard magazine's book The 500 Greatest Rock & Metal Albums of All Time.

== Legacy ==
In 2010, as a homage to Scenes from the Second Storey, Morrigan Books published an anthology of horror short stories by Australian authors, written and titled in the same order as the album's track listing. The authors included David Conyers, Stephen Dedman, Paul Haines, Robert Hood, Cat Sparks, Andrew J McKiernan and Kaaron Warren.

== Track listing ==
No.	Title	Length
1.	"Dream Machine"	5:24
2.	"She Said"	4:42
3.	"The Blind Man"	5:58
4.	"I've Seen the Man"	2:39
5.	"The Desert Song"	5:13
6.	"Home"	5:20
7.	"It's All Over"	5:55
8.	"Temptation"	5:14
9.	"Out"	5:10
10.	"Ego"	3:36
11.	"Seven"	16:39
12.	"Purity"	8:56
13.	"The Piano Song"	3:07

Released as CD and double LP. A double CD version including the Home EP was released in the US.

== Credits ==
- Produced by the God Machine
- Engineered by Kenny Jones
- Recorded at Blackwing, Maison Rouge and Matrix Studios, London except "The Piano Song" and "It's All Over" recorded at Joe's Garage with Roger Askew, and "Temptation" as a live improvisation recorded in Room 3
- All songs mixed by Kenny Jones at Matrix Studios
- Mastered by Kevin Metcalfe at The Townhouse
- Chant on "The Desert Song" by Katharine Gifford
- Programming by Andy Montgomery
- Preacher provided by the Hurting Choice
- Vocal on "Home" by the Voix de Bulgares
- Clarinet on "Seven" by Ian Bishop
- "Purity" recorded acoustically with Christiane Van Der Lee on cello, Anthony Pleeth on cello, Gavyn Wright on viola and Neil Filby on violin
- String arrangements by Robin Proper-Sheppard; conducted by Nick Ingman
- All other atmospheric nuances and nuisances created by The God Machine and Kenny Jones
- The God Machine is Robin Proper-Sheppard (vocals/guitar), Ron Austin (drums/piano) and Jimmy Fernandez (bass)
- All words by Proper-Sheppard, all music by Austin/Fernandez/Proper-Sheppard
- Published by Fiction Songs Ltd.

== Charts ==
1993 chart performance for Scenes from the Second Storey
Chart (1993)	Peak position
UK Albums (OCC)	55

2025 chart performance for Scenes from the Second Storey
Chart (2025)	Peak position
German Albums (Offizielle Top 100)	45
