= Ambleside Roman Fort =

Roman fort in Cumbria, England

- Galava
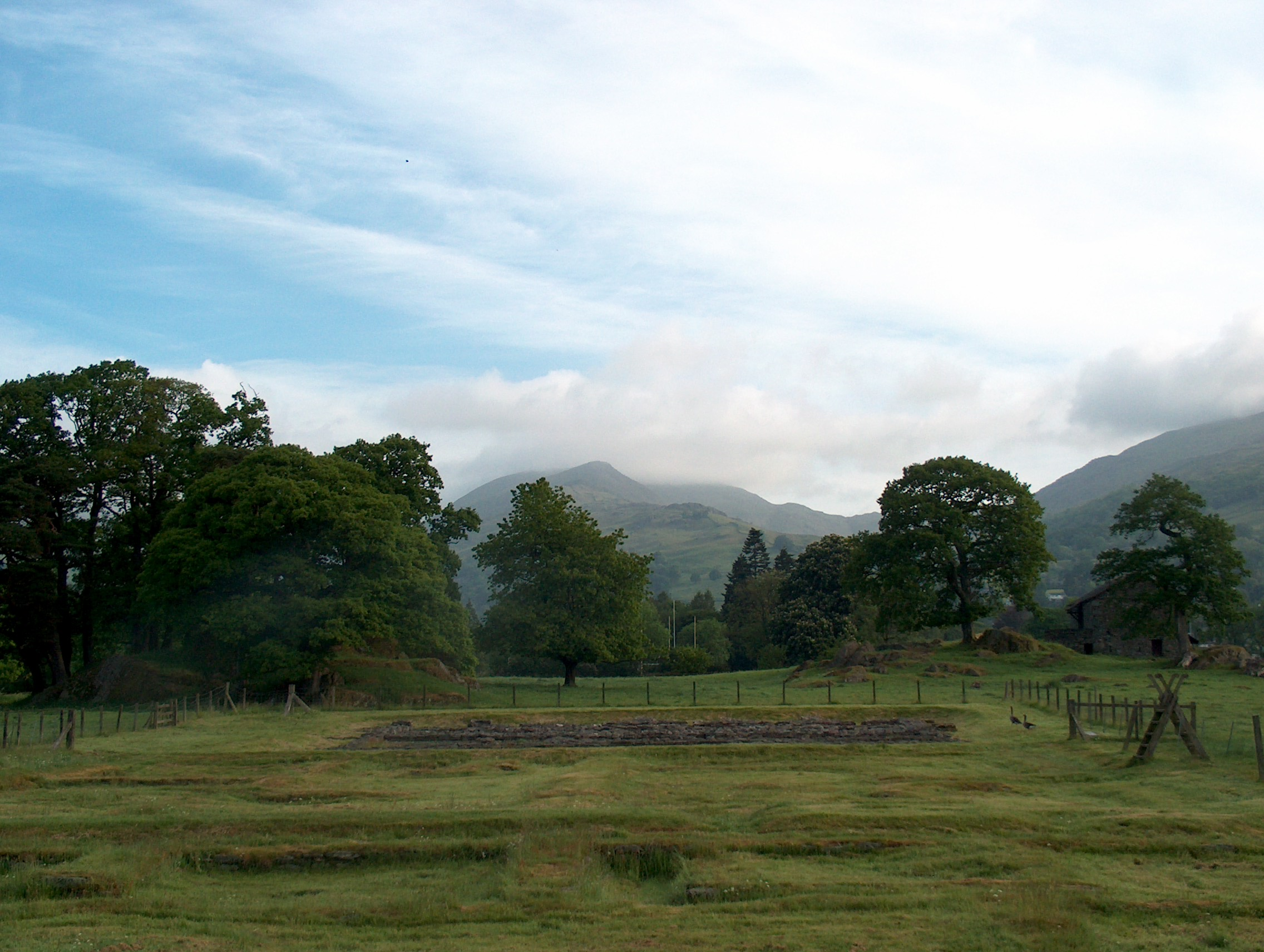

- Location within Cumbria
- 54.4223°N 2.9688°W
- Location: Waterhead, Ambleside, Cumbria, England

Site notes
- Archaeologists: R. G. Collingwood, F. Haverfield, R. H. Leech

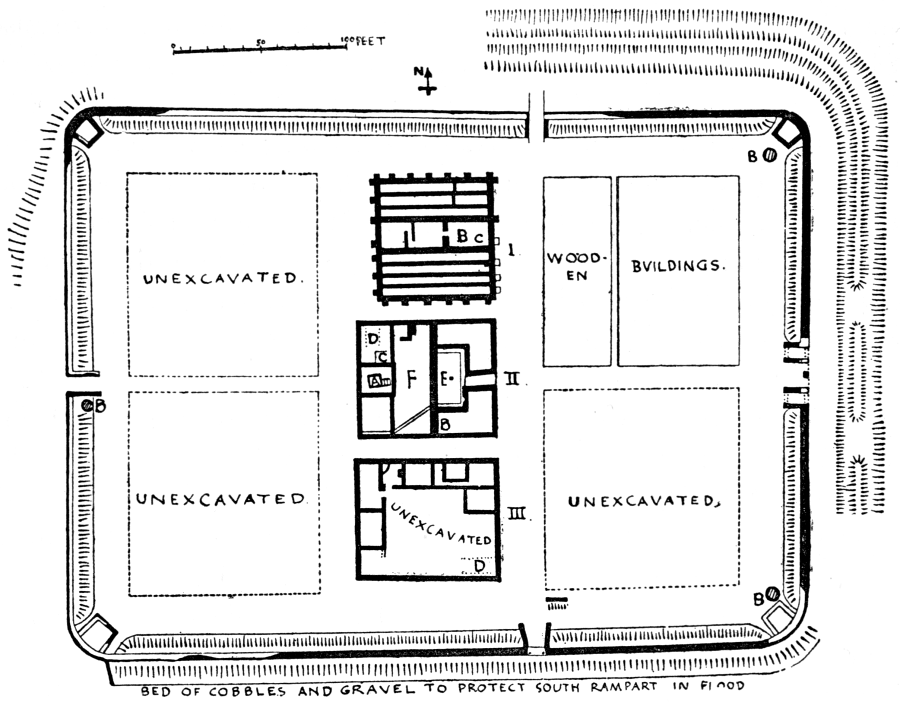
Plan of Ambleside fort, published in 1915. I. Granaries; II. Headquarters; III. Commandant's House; A. Cellar; B. Hearth or Kiln; C. Deposit of corn; D. Ditch perhaps belonging to earliest fort; E. Outer Court of Headquarters; F. Inner Court

Ambleside Roman Fort is the modern name given to the remains of a fort of the Roman province of Britannia. The ruins have been tentatively identified as those of either Galava or Clanoventa, mentioned in the Antonine Itinerary. Dating to the 1st or 2nd century AD, its ruins are located on the northern shore of Windermere at Waterhead, near Ambleside, in the English county of Cumbria, within the boundaries of the Lake District National Park.

The fort guarded the Roman road from Brougham to the Roman fort of Glannoventa by the sea at Ravenglass, by way of Hardknott Roman Fort. There is also assumed to have been a road south to the fort at Kendal. In 2016 it was reported that LIDAR technology had revealed a Roman road running north from Ambleside fort to Carlisle, and another running northwest to Papcastle. These roads had been previously described by John Horsley in his Britannia Romana of 1732.

The ruins are a Grade I listed structure. The site is open to the public, and is owned and managed by the National Trust. The site is a scheduled monument with list entry numbers of 1009348 and 1244785 (formerly RSM 13567 and RBS 450573)

== Location ==
Ambleside Roman Fort is situated approximately 0.8 kilometres (0.5 mi) south of Ambleside town centre, at the north end of Windermere, upon the eastern banks of the Brathay and Rothay rivers. The ruins occupy a field, known as Borrans Field, between the Brathay and Borrans Park.

The remains of the fort are situated upon a sand and gravel platform in Borrans Fields, which gently rises from the lakeshore. The fort stands less than 2 metres (6.6 ft) above the water level of the lake. The fort is bordered to the south and west by marsh, and an outcrop of rock dominates the northern section of Borrans Field. The underlying bedrock is volcanic tuff of the Lincomb Tarns Tuff Formation, overlain with alluvium. The soil is freely draining loam.

== Identification ==
The name of the fort is assumed to be recorded in Route X of the Antonine Itinerary. Route X records nine place-names in what is now northwestern England. Rivet and Smith proposed in 1979 that the route ran from the securely identified Bremetonnaci (modern Ribchester) to Ravenglass on the Cumbrian coast, and that the Ambleside fort was Galava of the Itinerary; this was generally accepted at the time and was adopted by the Ordnance Survey. However, the proposed allocation of Roman names in straightforward progression led to conflicts between the etymology of place names in the Itinerary and the local topography. Suggestions of alternate routes to conform to local topography suggested by the placenames resulted in marked divergence from the recorded distance between Alone (assigned to Watercrook) and Galava. Ian Smith has suggested a resolution to the problem by equating Alone with Lancaster on etymological grounds, and placed Galava on the River Bela, probably at Beetham in Cumbria. From Beetham, the route would then head inland, placing Clanoventa at Ambleside. Clanoventa is interpreted as meaning "shore market, town, or field" and Smith advocates this name as more appropriate than Galava, given the lakeside location, and Galava's meaning of "a forceful or vigorous stream". More recent publications, such as those of archaeologist David Shotter, have tentatively supported the interpretation of Ambleside Roman Fort as Clanoventa.

== Site history ==
The earliest, smaller, version of the fort was probably founded around the time of Agricola (AD 80–5), and it was occupied until at least AD 365. Early investigators suggested that it may have been abandoned after AD 85, and reoccupied in time of Hadrian (AD 117–138). However, more recent analysis of recovered ceramics from outside the fort showed no evidence of a break in occupation between 100 and 160 AD. Excavations of the towers indicate that it was destroyed once or twice in the 2nd or 3rd centuries, but the evidence is unclear. The fort appears to have had a large extramural settlement, and was apparently a significant centre for local storage and commerce.

=== Modern history ===
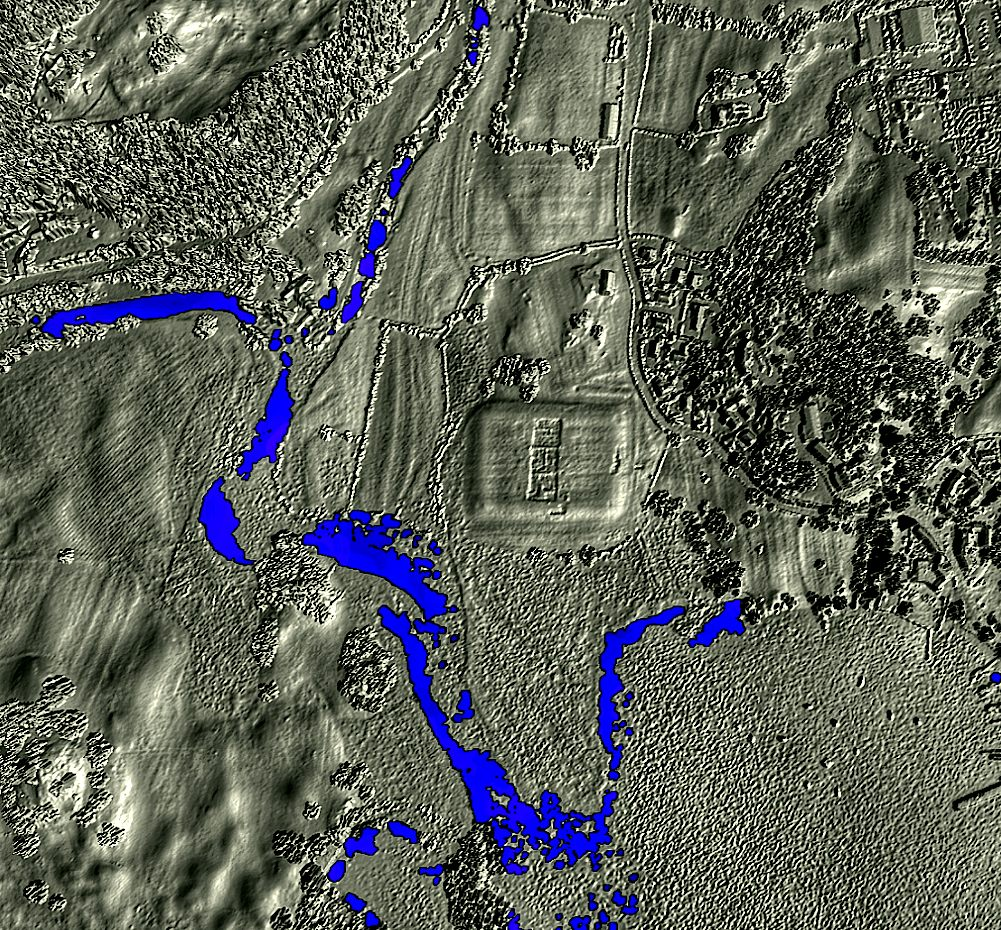
A lidar view of the fort.

The site of the fort was donated to the National Trust in 1913, after being purchased with funds raised by donations, a significant portion of which was collected locally. The remains of the fort were excavated in the second decade of the 20th century by historian R. G. Collingwood, who had been involved in the fundraising effort to save the remains from the threat of development. This included investigations of the gates, ramparts, towers, the principal structures in the centre of the fort, and the barracks. During these excavations, the remains of an earlier version of the fort were discovered near the central buildings; these included ditches and walls. The earlier version of the fort appeared to be smaller than the later version.

Excavations of the extensive Romano-British settlement outside the fort were undertaken in the 1960s and 1970s, with further investigations undertaken in the 1980s. A geophysical survey was undertaken in 2013 by Oxford Archaeology North. This survey recorded the outline of the fort, some of the internal layout, two of the four corner towers, some of the defences and ramparts, and some detail of external defences. The survey also returned evidence suggestive of settlement remains to the north of the fort.

== Site description ==
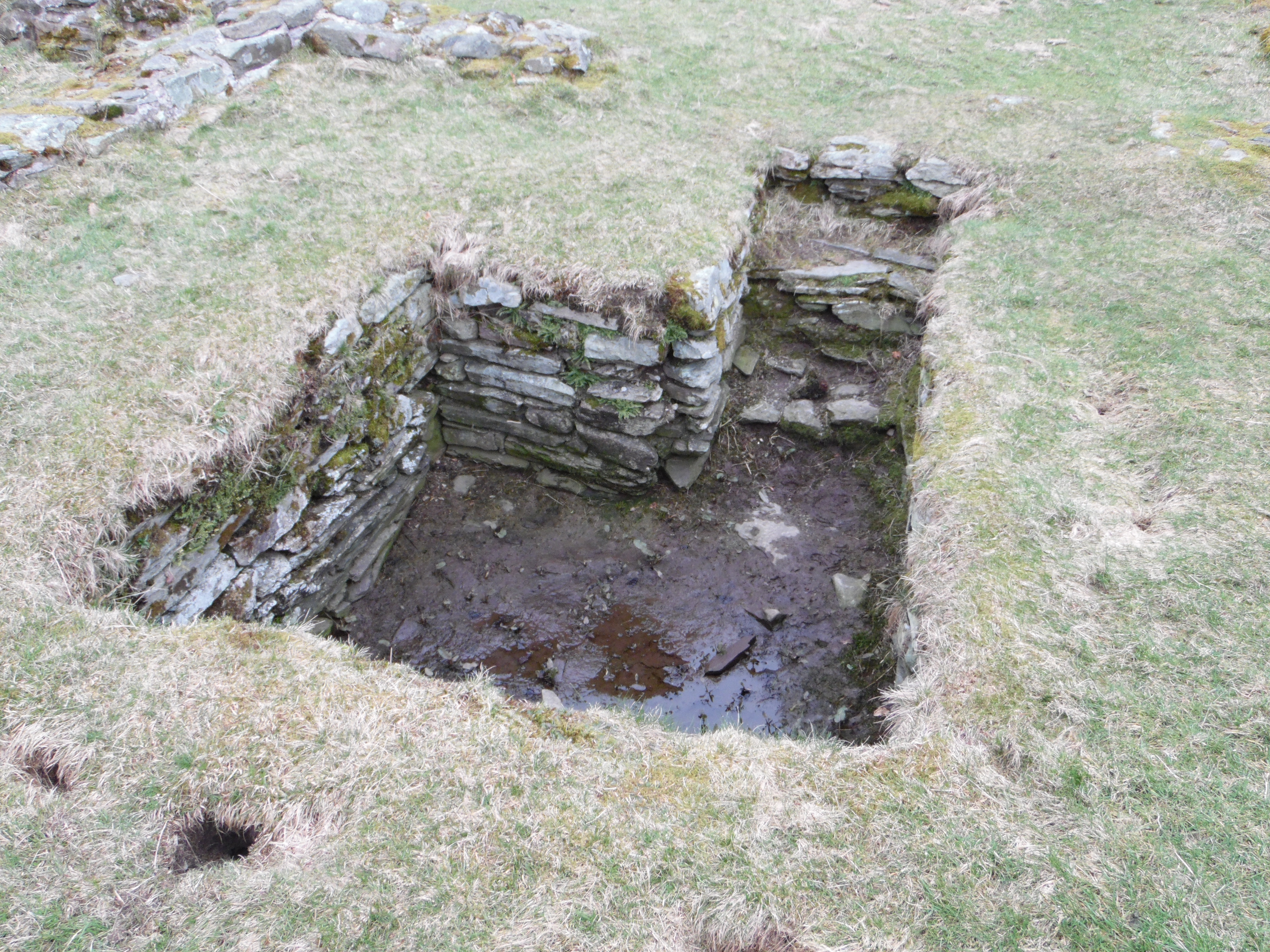
The regimental strong-room of Building II

The fort consisted of a rectangular enclosure measuring approximately 91 by 128 metres (300 by 420 ft), and covering an area of almost 1.2 hectares (3 acres). The fort had towers at each corner, and was enclosed by a 1.2-metre (4 ft) thick wall of roughly coursed stone. A clay ramp backed the wall from the inside, and a ditch ran around the outside.

Access to the fort was given by four gates, one on each side. Three of these gates were narrow single-width entry points, while the east gate was double-width and flanked by guard posts. A road extended from this across Borrans Park.

The principal buildings were laid out in a row across the centre of the fort's interior.

The barracks were at least partially built from wood.

Building I consisted of a pair of granaries, separated by a 4.6-metre (15 ft) wide space that once contained ovens. The presence of the ovens and remains of cereal indicate that this area was probably used for drying grain. It is unknown whether this area was roofed. The granaries themselves each measured 20 metres (66 ft) long (east-west) and were of a standard Roman plan, with external buttressing and with windows for ventilation. The granaries were rebuilt on at least one occasion.

Building II was the Principia or Praetorium, and was very similar to the example at Hardknott, some 16 kilometres (10 mi) to the west. It measured 21 by 23 metres (68 by 76 ft). The building was entered from the east, and had two courtyards, and three offices that faced onto the inner of these. The central office was the sacellum, and was used to store the altars and standards of the garrison. It contained a 1.8-metre (6 ft) square cellar accessed by a stone stairway; this probably was used as a strong-room for regimental funds. It was likely to have been vaulted with wood, rather than stone as at other sites. In the northern office, remains of a grain bin were excavated, identified from woodwork and cereal remains. The inner courtyard contained a detached building on the north side, and the whole courtyard may have been roofed. The remains of a hearth or oven were found within the colonnade around the outer courtyard.

Building III was the commander's house. The building had two storeys, and measured 21 by 24 metres (70 by 80 ft). It conformed to a standard plan of rooms arranged around a cloister that enclosed a small courtyard.

== Associated finds ==
A tombstone found at Ambleside bore an inscription that translates as "killed within the fort by the enemy", indicating that at some point the fort was attacked, but that Roman control of the area continued.

Finds from the early 20th century excavations included some coins of Faustina Iunior (161-175), Iulia Domna (193-217), and Valens (364-378). Ceramic finds included Samian ware dated to approximately AD 80 and later; this included a few examples of German Samian ware. Other finds included a silver spoon, pieces of glass, a number of bronze and iron artefacts, a lead basin, and seven lead sling-bullets.

During investigations associated with a road-building project in 1982, a bracelet of twisted gold wire was recovered from contractors' spoil near the fort. A variety of ceramic fragments were recovered, with the majority dating to the Hadrianic and early Antonine periods.

From Collingwood's excavations onwards, a number of lead slingshot bullets had been found in the vicinity of the fort. The scatter from the finds is suggestive of the idea that these were not randomly dropped, but may have resulted from a battle. Differences in appearance of the shot backed up when a 2021 project by the Trimontium Trust working with the University of Edinburgh carried out isotopic analysis of the bullets. This supported the idea that the two types of bullet were made from ore from two different sources. At the same time, a non-intrusive metal-detecting survey of the fortress site identified some 800 non-ferrous points, with very marked concentrations of point readings immediately outside the east wall of the fort, with another substantial scatter to the north. Alongside the tombstone inscription, and indications that some towers had been destroyed and rebuilt, the potential that many of these are sling-bullets may indicate that an otherwise unknown battle took place, either against uprising locals, or an insurrection from further north, with Roman firepower being directed to enemies outside the walls.

== Access ==
The site is open to the public. Finds are on display at The Armitt Museum in Ambleside.
