= One Last Laugh in a Place of Dying =

One Last Laugh in a Place of Dying...

Studio album by The God Machine
- Released: 1994
- Genre: Alternative rock, grunge, slowcore, alternative metal
- Length: 69:18
- Label: Fiction/Polydor

The God Machine chronology
scenes from the second storey (1993)	One Last Laugh in a Place of Dying... (1994)

One Last Laugh in a Place of Dying... is the second and final album by The God Machine. It was released on CD and LP in 1994 by Fiction Records/Polydor. The band had already ceased to function by the time of the album's release due to the sudden death of bassist Jimmy Fernandez earlier in the year.

== Critical reception ==
Professional ratings
Review scores
Source	Rating
AllMusic	3/5 stars
Rock Hard	8/10

In 2005, One Last Laugh in a Place of Dying... was ranked number 353 in Rock Hard magazine's book The 500 Greatest Rock & Metal Albums of All Time.

== Track listing ==
No.	Title	Length
1.	"The Tremolo Song"	4:04
2.	"Mama"	2:52
3.	"Alone"	4:50
4.	"In Bad Dreams"	3:10
5.	"Painless"	3:59
6.	"The Love Song"	3:56
7.	"The Life Song"	4:42
8.	"The Devil Song"	5:05
9.	"The Hunter"	7:59
10.	"Evol"	4:07
11.	"The Train Song"	4:28
12.	"The Flower Song"	5:42
13.	"Boy by the Roadside"	5:50
14.	"The Sunday Song"	8:34

== Charts ==
2025 chart performance for One Last Laugh in a Place of Dying
Chart (2025)	Peak position
Danish Vinyl Albums (Hitlisten)	40
German Albums (Offizielle Top 100)	51
