= Ravenglass Roman Bath House =

Archaeological site in Ravenglass, Cumbria, England

Coordinates: 54.3507°N 3.4042°W

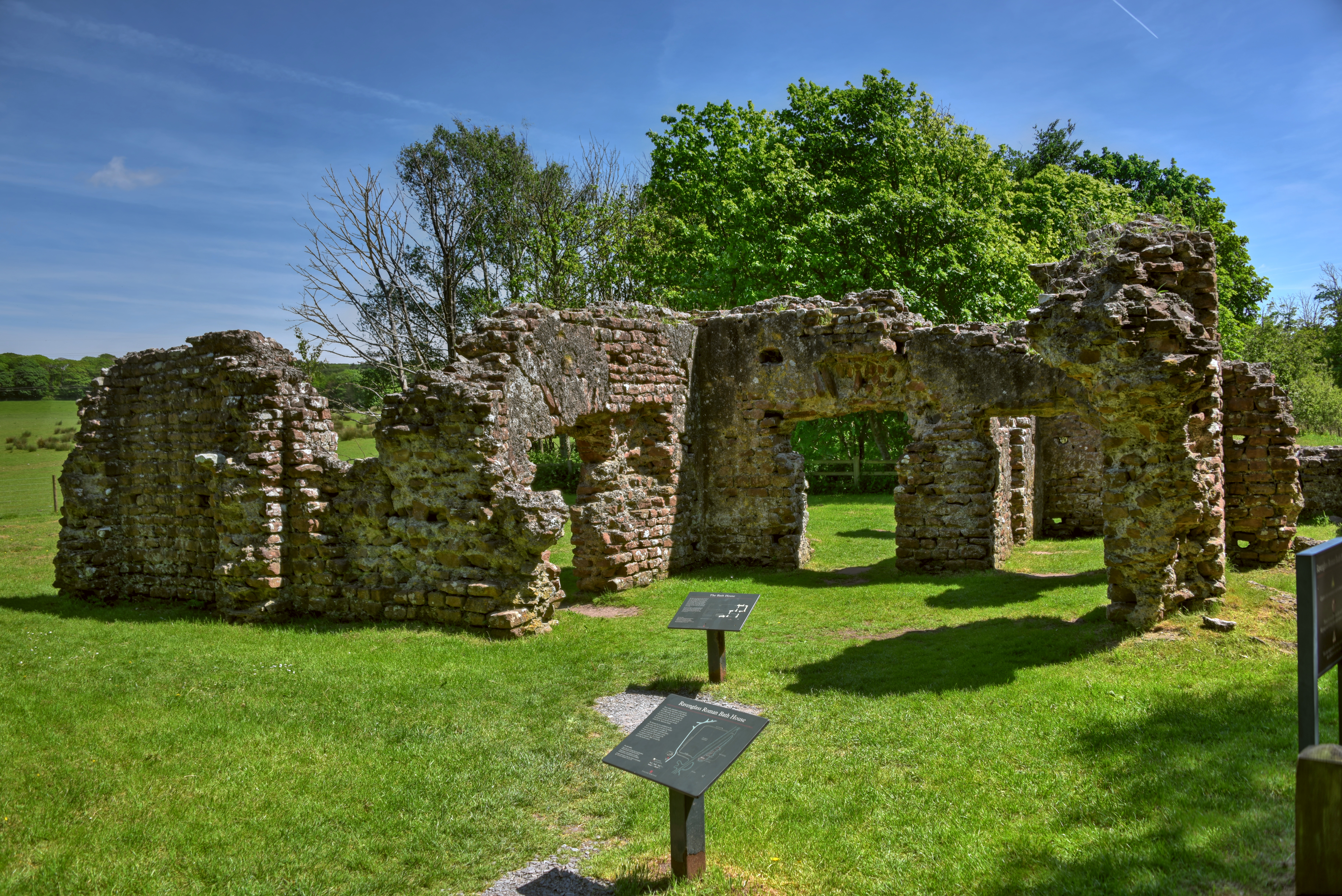
Walls Castle, at Ravenglass in Cumbria.

Ravenglass Roman Bath House (also known as Walls Castle) is a ruined ancient Roman bath house at Ravenglass, Cumbria, England. Belonging to a 2nd-century Roman fort and naval base (known to the Romans as Itunocelum), the bath house is described by Matthew Hyde in his update to the Pevsner Guide to Cumbria as "an astonishing survival". The still standing walls are 13 ft (4 m) high, there are patches of the internal rendering, in dull red and white cement, and traces of the splayed window openings remain.

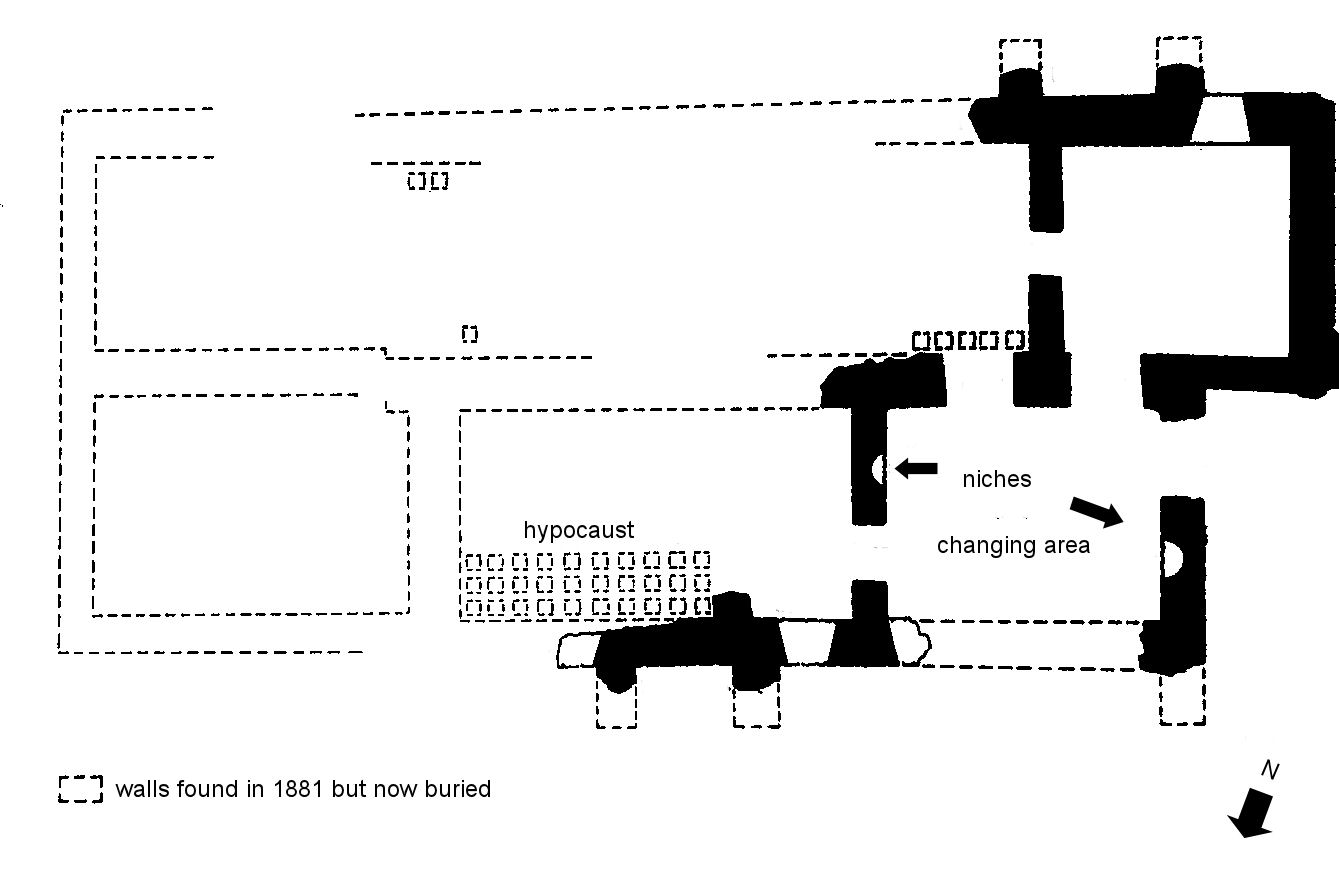
Plan of visible remains

The remaining fragment appears to be the west end of a building which was about 40 ft/12 metres wide and about 90 ft/27 metres long (see plan). It consisted of a suite of rooms arranged in a double sequence along the building. The entrance and changing area (apodyterium) contains niches, perhaps originally for statues. The use of the other rooms is not known, but there would have been a range of warm rooms, a hot bath and a cold plunge. The north and south walls have external buttresses which were probably intended to take the weight of a vaulted roof. Excavations were carried out at the bath house in 1881. Remains of the hypocaust heating system were uncovered, but they have since been reburied.

== Roman fort ==
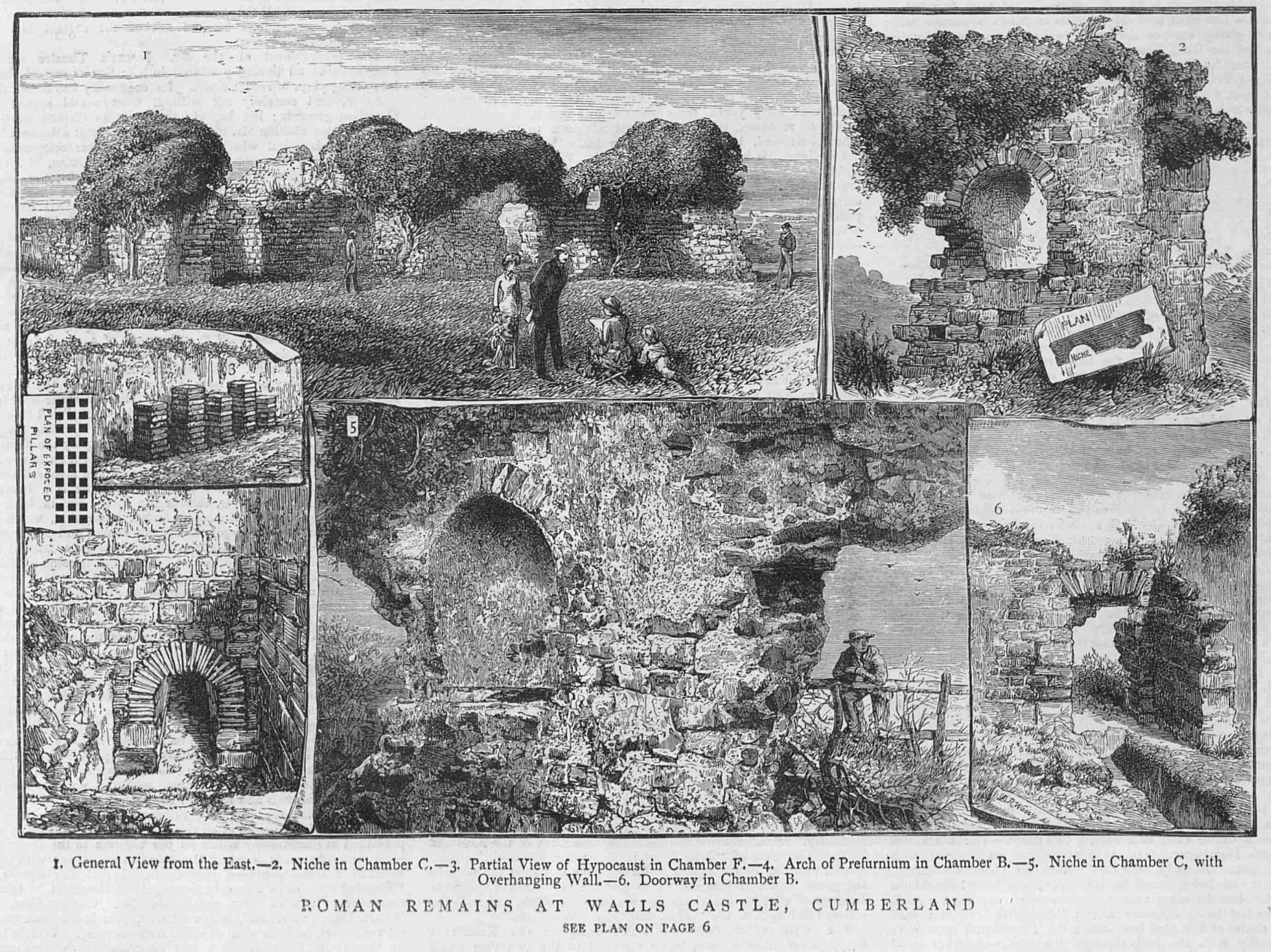
The remains at Walls Castle. The Graphic 1882

The bath house is located to the north east of the Roman fort. The fort's defences were originally of turf and timber, although in the early 3rd century a stone wall was constructed. The fort appears to have been occupied continuously from AD 130 until the end of the 4th century.

There is evidence that the bath house was fed with water from higher ground to the east of the fort. As the bath house is located outside the walls of the fort, some sources assume it served the civilian community as well as the military. However, prior to 2013, when a dig was started, little information was available about the vicus at Ravenglass.

== Conservation and access ==
The relatively good state of preservation of the bath house is believed to be attributable to its being adapted for domestic use in the medieval period. The building was identified as being Roman in the nineteenth century, although it was initially thought to be a villa and was not identified as a bath house until the twentieth century. It has been designated as a scheduled monument, and is in state care, being managed by English Heritage. It has been included in the World Heritage Site Frontiers of the Roman Empire.

The site can be reached from Ravenglass via a "miles without stiles" pedestrian route (part of a project to improve access for people with disabilities to places in the Lake District National Park). The route follows a private road which runs parallel to the railway. The ditch of the fort is visible from the bath house, but it is on private land and is bisected by the railway tracks of the Cumbrian Coast Line, which runs from Carlisle to Barrow-in-Furness, with a station at Ravenglass.

== See also ==
- Hardknott Roman Fort in Cumbria (nearest military bath house, between the fort and the modern road)
- Segedunum in Wallsend, Newcastle upon Tyne (reconstructed military bath house)
- List of Roman public baths
