= Alona (given name) =

Alona is a feminine given name. Notable people with the name include:

== Israel ==
In Hebrew, Alona (Hebrew: אלונה) is the feminine version of Alon.

- Alona Barkat (born 1969), Israeli businesswoman and football team owner
- Alona Frankel (born 1937), Polish-Israeli author and illustrator of children's books
- Alona Kimhi (born 1966), Israeli author and actress
- Alona Koshevatskiy (born 1997), Israeli rhythmic gymnast
- Alona Tal (born 1983), Israeli television actress

== Other cultures ==
- Alona Alegre (born 1948), Filipino actress
- Alona Bondarenko (born 1984), Ukrainian tennis player
- Alona Hertha (born 1987), German actress of Filipino descent

Fictional characters:

- Alona, a character in the Filipino television series Atlantika
