= Glannoventa =

Roman fort in Cumbria, England

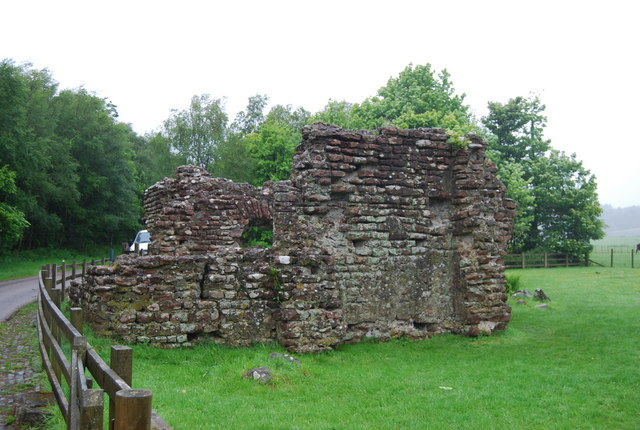
- Visible remains of the extra-mural Ravenglass Roman Bath House.

- Location within England
- 54°20′57″N 3°24′15″W
- Type: Fortification and settlement
- Periods: Roman Imperial
- Location: Ravenglass, Cumbria, England
- Region: Brittania

History
- Built: c.122

Site notes
- Excavation dates: 1976-8
- Public access: yes

Glannoventa is a Roman fort associated with the Roman naval base at Ravenglass in Cumbria, England. Its name is derived from the Latin place-name Clanoventa as recorded in the 2nd-century Antonine Itinerary, Glannibanta in the 4th-century Notitia Dignitatum, and Cantiventi in the 6th-century Ravenna Cosmography.

An infantry unit of the Roman army based at the fort in 158 AD was the First Cohort Aelia Classica, where ‘Aelius’ was the family name of the Emperor Hadrian, while ‘Classica’ is derived from the Latin classis ‘fleet’, suggesting that the soldiers were recruited from the fleet in Hadrian's time (117 to 138).

According to the entry in the Notitia Dignitatum, the Cohort I Morinorum, an infantry auxiliary of 500 men was stationed in Ravenglass in the 4th century.

Apart from the extramural bath house, little survives of the fort. A railway line was built through it in the nineteenth century, and one end has been affected by coastal erosion.

A Roman Road led inland via Hardknott Roman Fort and other sites named in the Ravenna Cosmography.

== Extra mural structures ==
=== Roman Bath House ===
The walls of a bath house, sometimes referred to as Walls Castle, survive to the remarkable height of 4 metres, and include bricked archways. This building was constructed to the north east of the fort. It is under the care of English Heritage.

=== Vicus ===
A project to excavate the vicus ("the civilian area to the east of the fort") began in 2013. It has concentrated on areas identified in a geophysical survey.
