= Alone: A Love Story =

Book and podcast by Michelle Parise

- Genre: Memoir
- Language: Canadian English

Cast and voices
- Hosted by: Michelle Parise

Production
- Length: 15–30 Minutes

Publication
- No. of seasons: 3
- No. of episodes: 32
- Original release: September 18, 2017
- Provider: Canadian Broadcasting Corporation
- Updates: Daily

Related
- Website: www.cbc.ca/radio/alone

Alone: A Love Story is a book and podcast by Canadian writer and journalist Michelle Parise.

== Background ==
The memoir is a story written by Michelle Parise. The story is about how Parise's marriage fell apart due to an affair and how she coped with the changes in her life after the divorce. Parise and her ex-husband purchased houses across the street from each other and Parise begins dating again at the age of 40. The story is about relationships and what it means to be lonely. The podcast won a Gold at the New York Festivals Radio Awards in 2018.

== Adaptions ==
- Parise, Michelle (May 2, 2020). Alone: A Love Story: A Love Story. Dundurn. ISBN 978-1-4597-4692-3. OCLC 1137380277.
- Parise, Michelle (September 9, 2020). Alone: A Love Story: A Love Story (16pt Large Print ed.). ReadHowYouWant. ISBN 978-0-3693-5683-3. OCLC 1235871699.
