= Alauna =

Alauna is the feminine form of the Gaulish god Alaunus or (possibly) an unrelated Celtic river goddess in her own right.

It appeared as the Latinized form of various placenames in Celtic Europe:

== Places ==
France

- Alauna, France or Alaunia, the Roman settlement at Valognes in Normandy
- Alauna or Alaunus, the Roman name of the River Aulne in Brittany

England

- Alauna Carvetiorum, the Roman coastal fort and settlement at Maryport in Cumbria
- Alauna, Alavana, Alona, or Alunna, generally identified with the Roman fort at Watercrook near Kendal in Cumbria
- Alauna, the Roman settlement at Alcester in Warwickshire
- The River Aln, sometimes identified with the Alauna or Alaunos River in Ptolemy's Geography
- The Roman settlement at Learchild, sometimes identified with the Alauna in Ptolemy's Geography

Scotland

- The Allan Water, sometimes identified with the Alauna or Alaunos River in Ptolemy's Geography
- Ardoch in Perthshire, sometimes identified with the Alauna in Ptolemy's Geography

United States

- Alauna, California, a village located between Trabuco Creek and Tijeras Creek

== See also ==
- Alaunus
- Alona (disambiguation)
