= Phobia (2013 film) =

American horror film

- Film poster
- Directed by: Rory Douglas Abel
- Produced by: Rory Douglas Abel; Matthew Barnes
- Starring: Michael Jefferson; Emma Dubery; Sarah Schoofs
- Cinematography: Mike Aransky
- Edited by: Rory Douglas Abel
- Music by: John Avarese
- Production companies: Biff Juggernaut Productions; Quiet Box Productions
- Distributed by: Image Entertainment
- Release date: November 3, 2013 (Drunken Zombie Film Festival)
- Running time: 94 minutes
- Country: United States
- Language: English

Phobia, also known by its original title of Alone, is a 2013 supernatural psychological horror drama film and the feature film directorial debut of Rory Douglas Abel. The movie had its world premiere on 3 November 2013 at the Drunken Zombie Film Festival and stars Michael Jefferson as an agoraphobic widower that begins to believe that he is being haunted by his wife's specter.

== Plot summary ==
Traumatized by the death of his wife Jane (Sarah Schoofs) via a car accident, Jonathan (Michael Jefferson) has developed such a severe case of agoraphobia that he cannot even leave the house to buy groceries or visit his therapist Dr. Edmondson (Peter Gregus). He's reliant on his friend Taylor (Andrew Ruth) and food delivery girl Bree (Emma Dubery) to provide him with companionship and food. Jonathan's tenuous existence is shattered one day when an invader (Jason Grimste) breaks in and strips away what little comfort he had left, prompting Jonathan to begin to experience visions of his wife and a strange Shade (Sandra Palmeri).

== Cast ==
- Michael Jefferson as Jonathan MacKinlay
- Emma Dubery as Bree
- Sarah Schoofs as Jane
- Peter Gregus as Dr. Edmondson
- Debbie Rochon as Bible Basher
- Sandra Palmeri as The Shade
- Jason Grimste as Home-Invader
- Andrew Ruth as Taylor
- Hardy Winburn as Driver

== Reception ==
DVD Verdict and Bloody Disgusting both gave mostly negative reviews for Phobia, and Bloody Disgusting wrote that "Despite what seems like the potential to be a good indie horror film, Phobia fails to capitalize on its opportunities. Despite the premise, the film just doesn’t bring anything new to the table, and instead just presents all of these elements and hardly does anything with them." HorrorNews.net was more mixed, commenting that the film might have worked better as a short film in the vein of I Am a Ghost, but that making the film feature length negatively impacted it effectiveness. In contrast, Ain't It Cool News was more positive and wrote in their review that "Filled with genuine scares, a chilling atmospheric setting, a sympathetic lead, and a conundrum that grabs you, PHOBIA is low budget filmmaking at its best."
