= Alavana =

Coordinates: 54°18.4884′N 2°44.8418′W

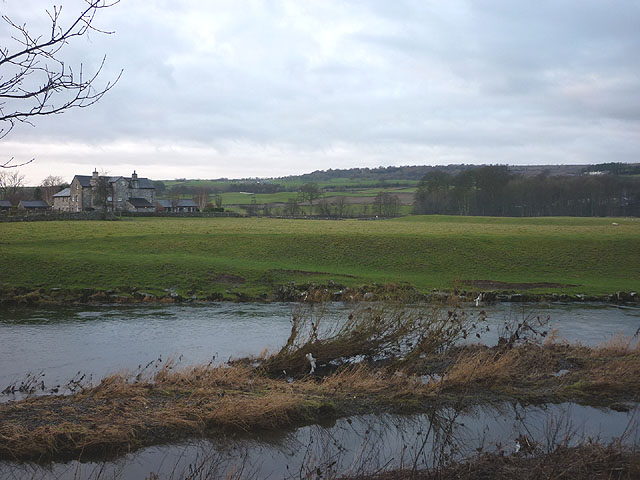
The site of the Roman fort at Watercrook across the River Kent.

Alavana was a name tentatively (and probably wrongly) applied to the ruins of a Roman fort at Watercrook about 2 mi (3.2 km) south of Kendal in Cumbria, for which the Roman name Medibogdo is a perfect fit to its river-bend position. The fort at Watercrook was erected around AD 90, originally in timber but then rebuilt in stone around the year 130 during the reign of Hadrian. The fort was abandoned for about 20 years during the Antonine occupation of Scotland. It was refurbished under Marcus Aurelius and occupied until around 270, when its military units departed. Its remains are now largely buried beneath a local farm, while excavated artifacts are displayed at the Kendal Museum.

Alone was probably the name of a civilian settlement at Kendal. The Antonine Itinerary placed it 18 m.p. from Galava and 19 m.p. from Calacum. It is a spelling variant of Alauna, a very common ancient name in Britain (at least a dozen instances) and on the Continent, which served primarily as a river name, and was applied secondarily to forts and settlements on those rivers. Sorting out all their locations and their spellings in ancient sources is not easy.
