= Ravenglass =

Village in Cumbria, England

Coordinates: 54.354°N 3.411°W

- Village
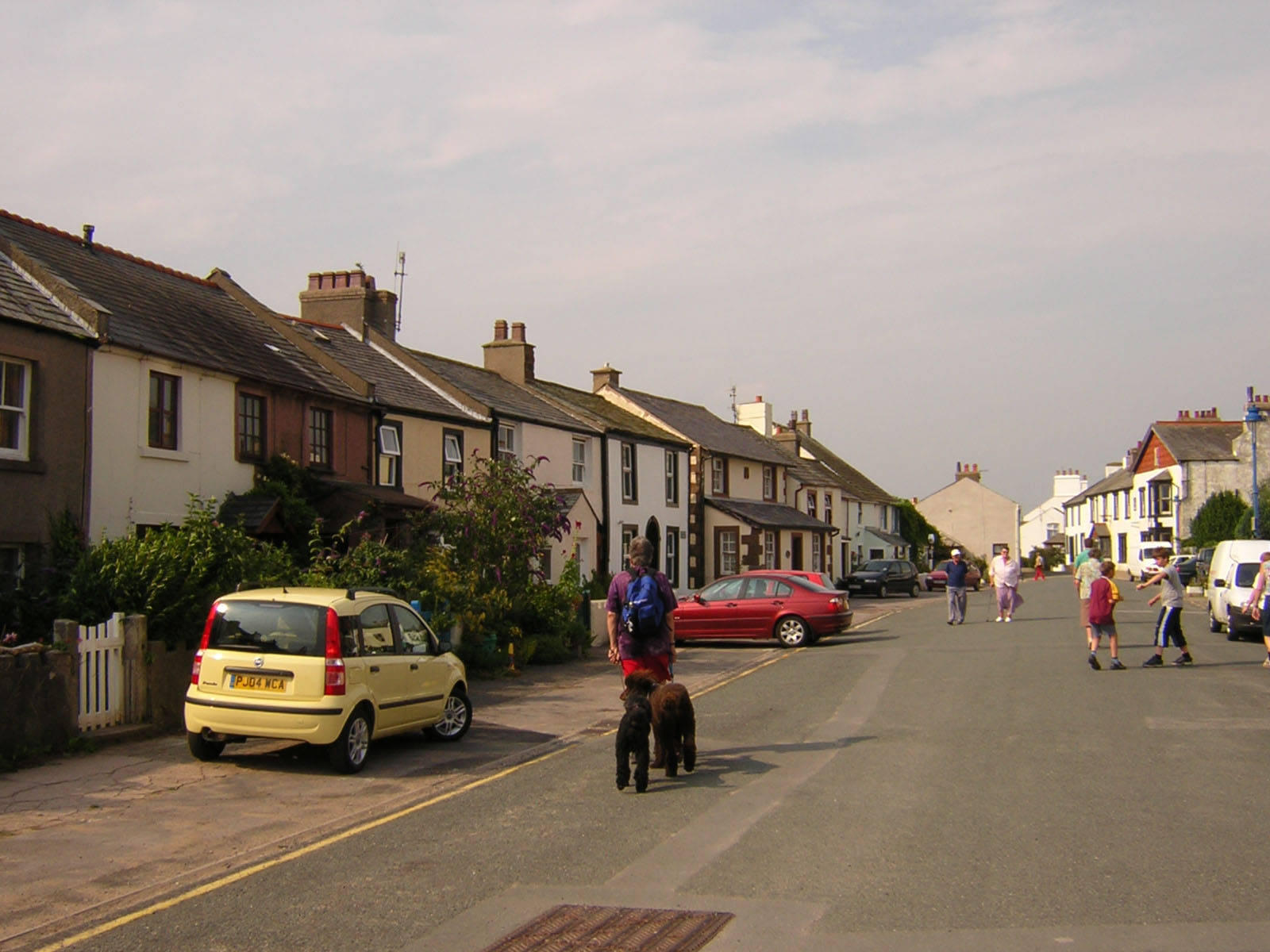
- View up Main Street

- Location in the former Copeland Borough Location within Cumbria
- OS grid reference: SD0896
- Civil parish: Muncaster
- Unitary authority: Cumberland
- Ceremonial county: Cumbria
- Region: North West
- Country: England
- Sovereign state: United Kingdom
- Post town: RAVENGLASS
- Postcode district: CA18
- Dialling code: 01229
- Police: Cumbria
- Fire: Cumbria
- Ambulance: North West
- UK Parliament: Barrow and Furness

Ravenglass is an English coastal village in west Cumbria that lies between Barrow-in-Furness and Whitehaven, on the estuary of three rivers: the Esk, Mite and Irt. It is the only coastal village in the Lake District National Park. Formerly in the historical county of Cumberland, it is now part of the civil parish of Muncaster, the unitary authority of Cumberland, and the ceremonial county of Cumbria.

== Toponymy ==
There are multiple explanations of the origin of the name Ravenglass. One is that it may be derived from the Brittonic Cumbric languiage yr afon glas, meaning "the greenish or blueish river". The name may also be of Norse-Irish origin, containing the Irish personal name Glas and meaning "Glas's part or share". The terminal element might be Gaelic glas, "small stream". Also suggested is derivation from the Old Norse personal name Hrafnkell, suffixed with Old Norse óss, "estuary".

== History ==
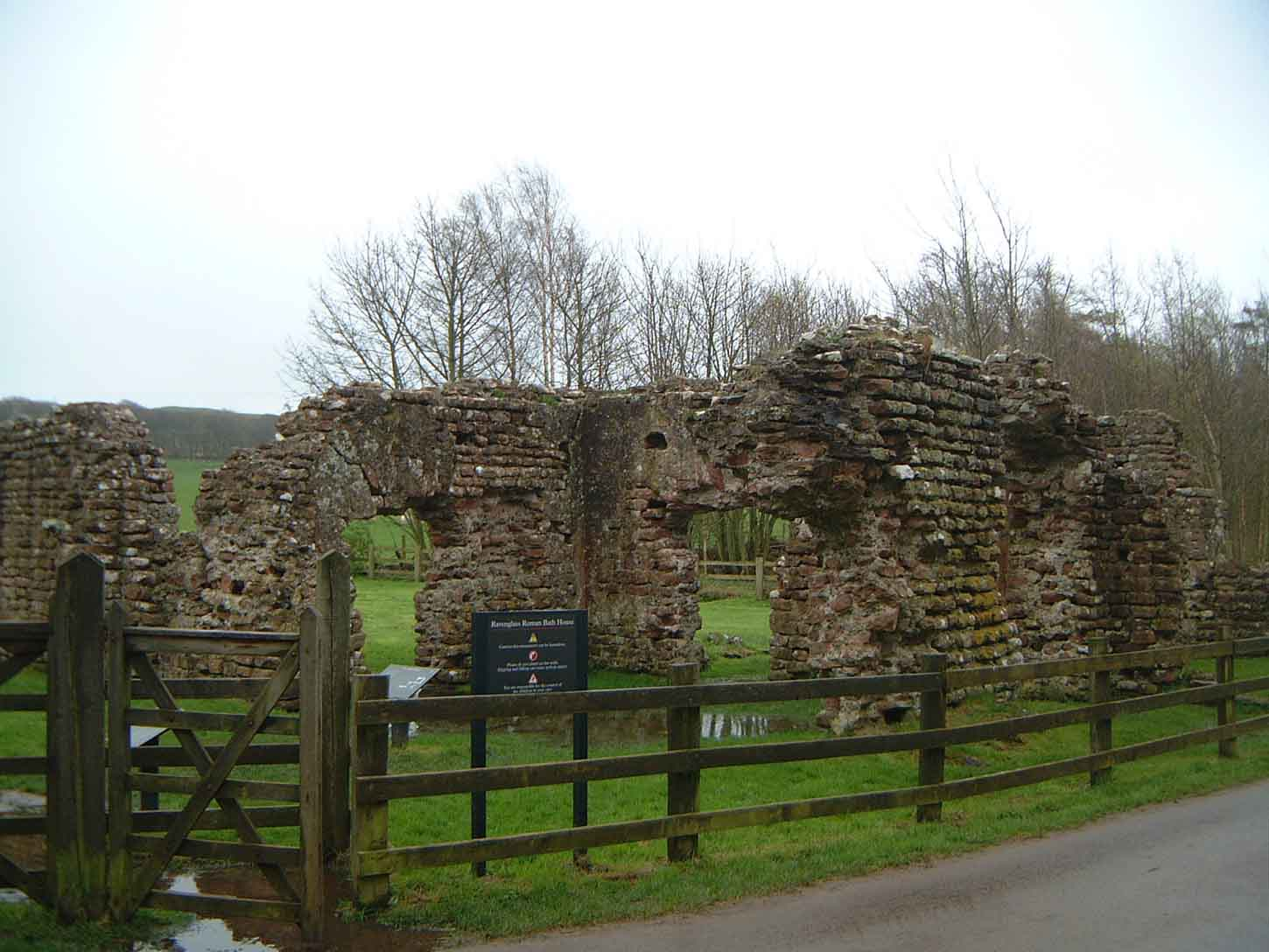
Walls Castle, Ravenglass

The village dates back to at least the 2nd century, when it was an important naval base for the Romans. The Latin name of the settlement was long thought to be Glannoventa. The discovery of a lead seal in excavations at the Roman fort during the 1970s named the Cohors Prima Aelia Classica (First Cohort of Hadrian's Marines). This unit is listed in the Notitia Dignitatum as being garrisoned at Itunocelum during the fourth century. Due to this it was suggested that Ravenglass was not Glannoventa but actually the Itunocelum.

Since the lead seal was discovered two other objects, a Roman military diploma from the beach by the fort at Ravenglass and a fragment of a Roman altar from Muncaster, have been found. These both name the Cohors Prima Aelia Classica and prove beyond reasonable doubt that Ravenglass was the Roman Itunocelum. The fort occupied the most southerly point of the Cumbrian coastal defence system, which can be seen as an extension of Hadrian's Wall and the western extremity of the Roman frontier World Heritage Site.

Ravenglass was occupied by the Romans for over 300 years and had a Roman garrison (castra) of 500 soldiers. The town was a regional supply point for much of northwestern Roman Britain, with a road from Ravenglass over the Hardknott Pass to the Roman forts at Hardknott and Ambleside. The location is featured in The Fort at River's Bend, a book in Jack Whyte's A Dream of Eagles (Camulod Chronicles) series, and is also mentioned briefly in Mary Stewart's Merlin trilogy under the name Clannoventa. Today, there are few Roman remains, with the notable exception of a bath house, known locally as Walls Castle. This is one of the largest remaining Roman structures in England, originally covering an estimated area of 30 yards (27 m) by 13 yards (12 m) and with walls up to 12 feet (3.7 m) high, though only one end is now visible. Excavations of the rest of the foundations have since been covered and are not visible. The property is now maintained by English Heritage.

Approximately a mile's walk from the bath house is Muncaster Castle, which it is believed was built partly with the remains of a Roman fort which was located near Ravenglass. The grade II listed Muncaster War Memorial, designed by Edwin Lutyens, sits between Muncaster and Ravenglass.

'Renglas' appears in charters and other records of the late 12th century. In 1208 King John granted Richard de Lucy, Earl of Egremont a charter for a market at Ravenglass on Saturdays and a yearly fair on the festival of St. James, 5 August. In 1297 Ravenglass was described as a port along with Lancaster, Cartmel and Workington.

Ravenglass is reputed to be the birthplace of Saint Patrick.

The population in 1841 was 337 inhabitants.

== Governance ==
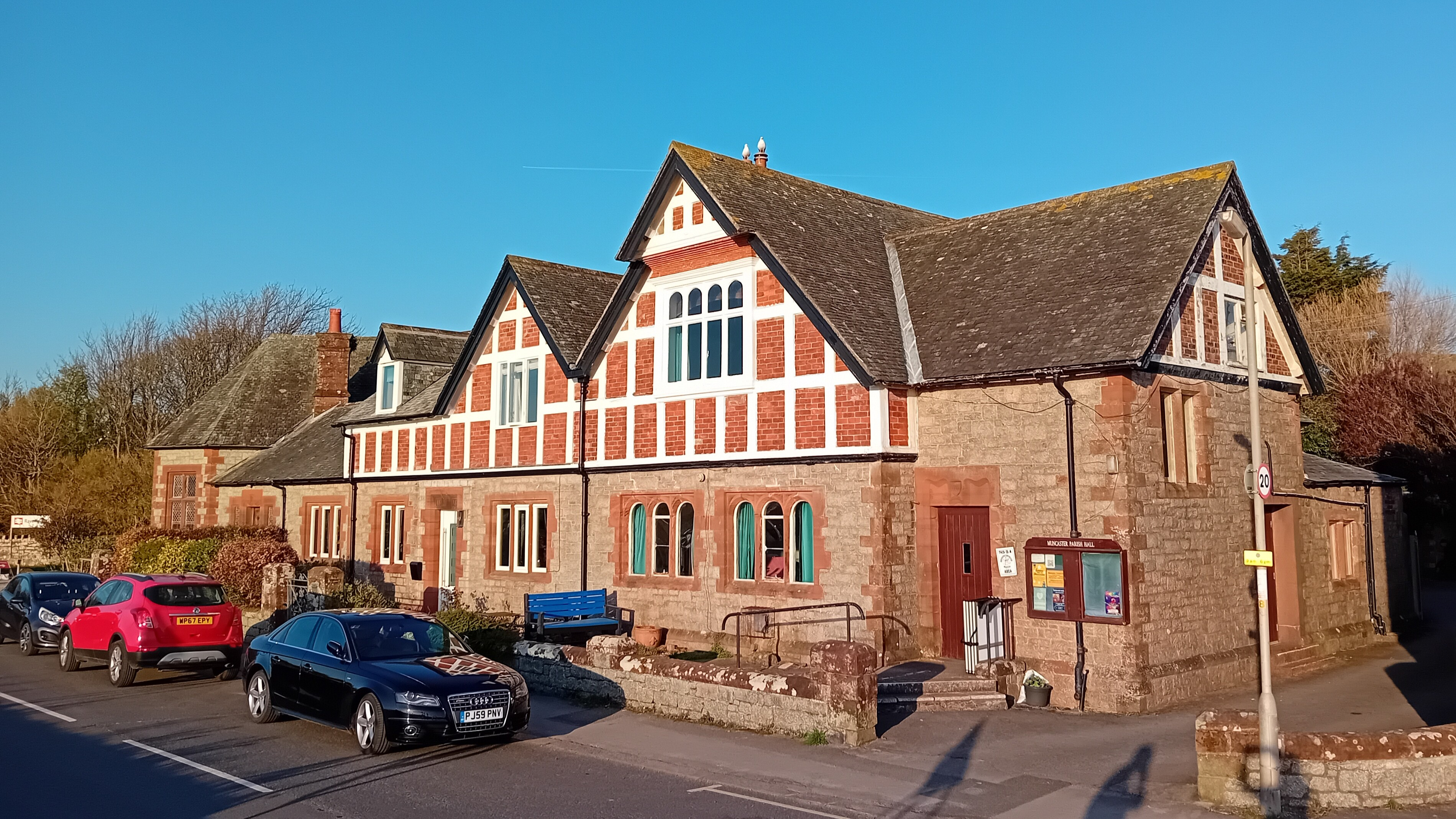
Muncaster Parish Hall, Main Street, Ravenglass

Ravenglass is the main settlement within the civil parish of Muncaster. There are two tiers of local government covering Muncaster, at parish and unitary authority level: Muncaster Parish Council and Cumberland Council. The parish council generally meets at Muncaster Parish Hall, which is on Main Street in Ravenglass. The parish is wholly within the Lake District National Park, and so some functions are administered by the Lake District National Park Authority, notably planning.

At a national level, the parish is within the Barrow and Furness UK parliamentary constituency.

From 1974 to 2023, before the creation of Cumberland Council, Ravenglass was governed by Copeland Borough Council and Cumbria County Council.

== Attractions ==
Tourist attractions include Muncaster Castle and the Ravenglass and Eskdale Railway.

== Transport ==
=== National Rail ===
Ravenglass is served by Ravenglass railway station on the Cumbrian Coast railway line, with trains to Carlisle and Lancaster as well as a few continuing to Manchester Airport.

=== Heritage rail ===
This station is also a terminus of the narrow-gauge Ravenglass and Eskdale Railway, which runs inland up Eskdale. This serves both as a tourist attraction and as local transport during its operating season.

=== Bus ===
Stagecoach operates the service in the village on 1 route. The X7 to either Whitehaven via Thornhill & Egremont or to Millom via Bootle.

=== Road ===
Ravenglass is connected by a minor road to the nearby A595 trunk road. It also has minor tracks running northwards and southwards via tidal fords, which are unsuitable for normal motor vehicles.

== Media ==
The 1972 Granada television serial The Intruder - based on the novel of the same name by John Rowe Townsend - was predominantly filmed in Ravenglass which represented the fictional location of Skirlston. Eskdale and Rafnglass (modern Ravenglass) feature in Rosemary Sutcliff's final novel (1992) Sword Song, set in the 9th century.
