= List of works based on Arthurian legends =

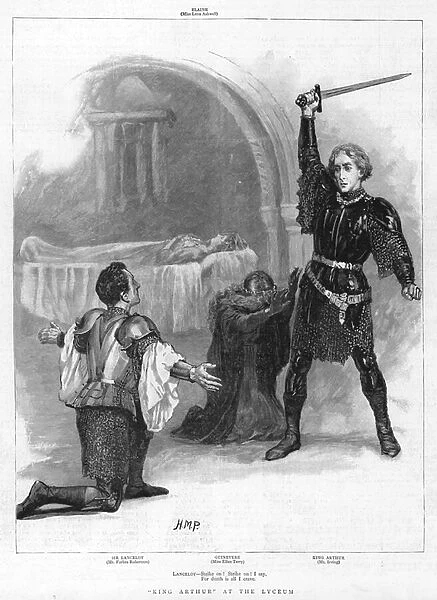
King Arthur at the Lyceum Theatre, London, 1895

The Matter of Britain stories, focusing on King Arthur, are one of the most popular literary subjects of all time, and have been adapted numerous times in every form of media. This list enumerates some of the notable works.

== Modern literature ==
- Adam Ardrey: Finding Merlin (2007)
- A. A. Attanasio: The Dragon and the Unicorn (1994), The Eagle and the Sword (1997), The Wolf and the Crown (1998), and The Serpent and the Grail (1999)
- T. A. Barron: The Merlin Saga, about the life of Merlin (1996–2011)
- Donald Barthelme: The King (1990), in which Arthurian characters fight in WWII and the atomic bomb has characteristics of the Holy Grail
- Derek Benz and J. S. Lewis: The Revenge of the Shadow King (2006) reveals an alternate history of Arthur who was betrayed and murdered by his half-sister Morgan le Fay, who is portrayed as an evil immortal being known as the Black Witch, for possession of a sacred book which had been passed down father-to-son for thousands of years. In this case, Arthur was betrayed when he refused to pass the book on to his illegitimate son. The book was passed to Arthur's true son, and from Arthur's son came the Knights Templar.
- Thomas Berger: Arthur Rex (1978) is a tragicomic retelling of the Arthurian legend.
- Marion Zimmer Bradley: The Mists of Avalon (1983) is the classic of modern reinterpretations of the Arthurian legend through the points of view of powerful women behind Camelot, namely Morgaine, Gwenhwyfar, and Morgause.
- Gillian Bradshaw: The Down the Long Wind trilogy Hawk of May (1980), Kingdom of Summer (1982), and In Winter's Shadow (also 1982) looks at the King Arthur legend through the eyes of a classical scholar.
- James Herbert Brennan: The GrailQuest (1984–87) gamebooks center on the kingdom of King Arthur.
- Sallie Bridges (1830–1910): Marble Isle (1864) is a collection of poems based on episodes in Malory.
- Bryher: Ruan (1960) is a historical novel in Britain immediately after Arthur's death.
- Meg Cabot: Avalon High (2005) is a novel in which high school students find themselves to be reincarnations of characters from the Arthurian cycle.
- Mark Chadbourn: The Age of Misrule, The Dark Age and Kingdom of the Serpent trilogies (2000–09) take a modern twist of Arthurian legend and Celtic mythology, using them as a basis for a dark series of novels set in modern Britain, in which the Celtic gods return to take back the land.
- Douglas Clegg: Mordred, Bastard Son (2006) centers on a sympathetic Mordred, who enters into a romance with Lancelot.
- Molly Cochran and Warren Murphy: The Forever King (1992) is a trilogy of books set in modern-day about a boy who is King Arthur reincarnated and his protector Hal, a former police officer who is the reincarnation of Galahad.
- Susan Cooper: The Dark Is Rising Sequence is a five volume young adult fantasy collection (1965–77).
- Bernard Cornwell: The Warlord Chronicles (1995–97) consist of three novels, Winter King, Enemy of God, and Excalibur, and reintroduce many old characters into the tale.
- Kevin Crossley-Holland: The Seeing Stone (2000), At the Crossing-Places (2001), and King of the Middle-March (2003).
- Peter David: Knight trilogy depicts Arthur reappearing in the modern-day world. In the first novel, Knight Life (1987), Arthur emerges from his thousand-year convalescence that followed the wound he sustained from Mordred to run for mayor of New York City. In One Knight Only (2003), he faces another epic hero for possession of the Holy Grail. In Fall of Knight (2006), the villain Arthur encounters is a person from actual history, who possesses the Spear of Destiny, and wants to use it to destroy the Earth.
- Tracy Deonn: Legendborn (2020) and its subsequent sequels Bloodmarked (2022) and Oathbound (2025). Called "a modern-day twist on Arthurian legend", it follows a black teenage girl who discovers a secret and historically white magic society.
- Bryan Davis: Dragons in Our Midst series (2004–05) & its sequels, Oracles Of Fire (2006–09), and Children of the Bard (2011–15)
- David Drake: The Dragon Lord (1979), a somewhat unconventional story involving a "King Arthur" who is more great military general than quasi-enchanted king; it takes place shortly after the fall of the Roman Empire and long before the Age of Chivalry.
- Robert W. Fuller: The Rowan Tree (2013), a political novel that casts the Arthurian legend in a modern historical setting.
- David Gemmell: Ghost King (1988), Last Sword of Power (1988), The entire series deals with the Stones of Power, also known as the Sipstrassi. The first two books contain a re-imaging of the Arthurian legend.
- Parke Godwin: Firelord (1980), Beloved Exile (1984), and The Last Rainbow (1985)
- Roger Lancelyn Green: King Arthur and His Knights of the Round Table (1953)
- Lev Grossman: The Bright Sword (2024) follows the aftermath of King Arthur's death at the Battle of Camlann, and focuses on giving depth to traditionally minor knights.
- Malcolm Guite: Galahad and the Grail (2026) is a ballad retelling of Arthurian legend, the first of four proposed volumes collectively called Merlin’s Isle.
- Robert Holdstock: The Merlin Codex series (2001–07) is a trilogy of mythic fiction novels which trace Merlin's adventures in Europe before the time of King Arthur, placing him alongside Jason and the Argonauts and Uther Pendragon.
- Helen Hollick: Pendragon's Banner trilogy (1994–97)
- Kazuo Ishiguro: The Buried Giant (2015), set in Britain after Arthur's death.
- Phyllis Ann Karr: The Idylls of the Queen (1982)
- Guy Gavriel Kay: The Fionavar Tapestry (1984–86) is the continuation of the Camelot story in the framework of a wider epic.
- J. Robert King: Mad Merlin (2000), Lancelot Du Lethe (2001), and Le Morte D'Avalon (2003) is the retelling of the Arthurian legend from the perspectives of Merlin and Lancelot rather than on the usual Arthur. King weaves his tale by combining bits of folklore and mythology with both sheer invention and historical fact. Merlin is actually the god Jupiter.
- Stephen King: The Dark Tower VI: Song of Susannah (2004) reveals that the hero of King's spaghetti-western/fantasy/sci-fi magnum opus adventure series, Roland, is one of only two of King Arthur's surviving descendants. The version of Arthur in Roland's world is known as Arthur Eld, and was the founder of the order of Gunslingers, knightly warriors who wield revolver pistols in the name of justice; Eld's own guns were reportedly forged from the metal of Excalibur itself.
- James Knowles: The Legends of King Arthur and his Knights (1860)
- Giles Kristian: Lancelot (2018) and its sequel, Camelot (2020) are historical re-imagining of the Arthur myths, told from the perspective of Lancelot.
- Sidney Lanier: The Boy's King Arthur (1880) is a work based on Thomas Malory's Le Morte d'Arthur, written in such a way to appeal to the boys of the 19th century.
- Stephen R. Lawhead: The Pendragon Cycle (1987–1999), a more thorough examination of the myths, especially concerning Taliesin, Merlin, Arthur, Pendragon, and the Grail.
- C.S. Lewis: That Hideous Strength (1945) makes reference to Arthur and aspects of Arthurian legend, albeit with his own twist, in the final installment of his Space Trilogy.
- Bernard Malamud: The Natural (1952), a modern reinterpretation of the Fisher King story, centered around a baseball team known as the New York Knights. Also a 1984 film.
- John Masefield: A cycle of poetry concerning the Arthurian legend. (Edwardian-Post WWII)
- Nancy McKenzie: Queen of Camelot (2002), where Guinevere gives a first-hand account of her life, Grail Prince (2003), set directly after Arthur's death at Camlann, and Prince of Dreams (2004)
- Rosalind Miles: Guenevere Trilogy is a fictional trilogy that follows Guenevere and King Arthur through their reign as High King and Queen.
- Michael Morpurgo: Arthur, High King of Britain (1994)
- Gerald Morris: The Squire's Tales and The Knight's Tales are collections for teen readers based in the Middle Ages.
- Garth Nix: Contained in Nix's collection Across the Wall are two stories that present a different take on the Arthurian legends: "Under the Lake", a short story that portrays the Lady of the Lake as a parasitic, monstrous creature, and "Heart's Desire", which tells of Merlin and his apprentice Nimue, and the ultimately doomed relationship between them.
- Robert Nye: Merlin, which gives a paganistic view of Merlin's intrigues to make Arthur king.
- Sean Poage: The Retreat to Avalon (2018), The Strife of Camlann (2021), Hengist (2023)
- Tim Powers: The Drawing of the Dark depicts an eternal King Arthur reincarnated to participate in the Siege of Vienna.
- John Cowper Powys: Porius (A Romance of the Dark Ages) (1951).
- Howard Pyle: King Arthur and His Knights of The Round Table (1903)
- Mary Reed and Eric Mayer: The historical mystery One for Sorrow has the protagonist John, the Lord Chamberlain meeting with a Knight of the Round Table who comes to Constantinople in search of the Holy Grail.
- Philip Reeve: Here Lies Arthur tells of a more tyrannical Arthur in the time of the Dark Ages.
- Lisa Ann Sandell: Song of the Sparrow, a retelling of the story of Elaine of Ascolat, the Lady of Shalott.
- Jack Spicer: The Holy Grail, a series of poems spoken by various Arthurian characters (1962).
- Nancy Springer: I am Mordred and I am Morgan le Fay are two young adult novels about the two often misunderstood characters of Camelot.
- John Steinbeck: The Acts of King Arthur and His Noble Knights is a traditional take in modern language. Steinbeck also compared the adventures of the paisanos in his early novel Tortilla Flat to the exploits of Arthur's knights.
- Sara Hawks Sterling: A Lady of King Arthur's Court
- Mary Stewart: The Crystal Cave sets up the background for the Arthurian legend. The Hollow Hills encompasses most of Arthur's lifespan, including his childhood with Merlin as his tutor. The Last Enchantment deals with Merlin's later life, against the continued background of Arthur's rule. A later book, The Wicked Day, was written from the point of view of Mordred in the latter period of Arthur's rule, and provides an interesting counterpoint to the original three novels.
- Rosemary Sutcliff: The Lantern Bearers (1959), Sword at Sunset (1963), Tristan and Iseult (1971); The King Arthur Trilogy (2007), an omnibus edition of Sutclff's Arthurian Trilogy: The Light Beyond the Forest (1979), The Sword and the Circle (1981), and The Road to Camlann (1981); The Shining Company (1990), a retelling of the Y Gododdin, which contains the earliest mention of Arthur's name. In Taliesin's Successors: Interviews with authors of modern Arthurian literature, The Camelot Project at the University of Rochester (August 1986), Raymond H. Thompson described these seven works by Sutcliff as "some of the finest contemporary recreations of the Arthurian story".
- Alfred, Lord Tennyson: Idylls of the King
- Lavie Tidhar: By Force Alone (2020)
- J.R.R. Tolkien: The Fall of Arthur is an unfinished poem, posthumously published in 2013.
- Nikolai Tolstoy:The Coming of the King—part one of an unfinished trilogy, dealing with Merlin and various Arthurian characters.
- Mark Twain: A Connecticut Yankee in King Arthur's Court
- Jack Vance: The Lyonesse Trilogy, set before Arthur's time on the Elder Isles, a fictional archipelago inspired by the tales of Lyonesse, Ys, and other lost lands associated with Arthurian legend.
- Kiersten White: The Camelot Rising trilogy, which consists of The Guinevere Deception, The Camelot Betrayal and The Excalibur Curse. The story is presented as the real Guinevere having died before reaching Camelot to wed Arthur. Taking her place is a changeling, Merlin's adoptive daughter, who could be exiled should her magic nature be revealed.
- T. H. White: The Once and Future King cycle
- Jack Whyte: The Camulod Chronicles, a series of books containing more historical fiction than fantasy beginning with Roman Britain and leading through Arthur's reign.
- Joan Wolf: The Road to Avalon (1988)
- Persia Woolley: Child of the Northern Spring, Queen of the Summer Stars, and Guinevere: The Legend in Autumn

== Theatre ==
=== Musical theatre ===
- King Arthur, or The British Worthy by John Dryden, with music by Henry Purcell (1691)
- King Arthur by Laurence Binyon, with music by Edward Elgar (1923)
- King Arthur by D. G. Bridson, with music by Benjamin Britten (1937)
- Camelot by Alan Jay Lerner and Frederick Loewe (1960). It is based on the King Arthur legend as adapted from the T. H. White novel The Once and Future King. Originally starring Richard Burton as Arthur, Julie Andrews as Guinevere, and introducing Robert Goulet as Lancelot. The original cast album of the show was a particular favorite of then-President John F. Kennedy, and the "Camelot" metaphor has been often associated with his presidency. Camelot, the movie, was filmed in 1967, with Richard Harris as King Arthur, Vanessa Redgrave as Guenevere, and Franco Nero as Lancelot.
- Merlin, a musical, with concept by illusionist Doug Henning and Barbara De Angelis, written by Richard Levinson and William Link, with music (and incidental music) by Elmer Bernstein and lyrics by Don Black (1983)
- Spamalot, by John Du Prez and Eric Idle, with lyrics and book by Eric Idle (2004). Adapted from the film Monty Python and the Holy Grail by Monty Python. It won the 2004–2005 Tony Award for Best Musical. Starring Tim Curry as King Arthur.
- La Légende du roi Arthur by Dove Attia, a French musical comedy that premiered in Paris in 2015.

=== Straight plays ===
- The Island of the Mighty, an Arthurian trilogy by John Arden and Margaretta Ruth D'Arcy (1972), produced by the Royal Shakespeare Company, Aldwych Theatre, which led to the creation of the Theatre Writers' Union

=== Verse plays ===
The Arthurian legend has proved a constant source of material for verse dramatists. Several adaptations exist, most dealing with the love triangle between Arthur, Guinevere and Lancelot. Some notable examples are:

==== Classical verse plays ====
- The Misfortunes of Arthur by Sir Thomas Hughes (1587)
- Vortigern: An Historical Tragedy in Five Acts by W. H. Ireland (1799)
- Tom Thumb the Great: A Burlesque Tragedy, in Two Acts Altered, from Fielding by Kane O'Hara (1805)
- King Arthur: Or, Launcelot the Loose, Gin-Ever the Square, and the Knights of the Round Table, and Other Furniture. A Burlesque Extravaganza by W. M. Akhurst, with editing by Rosemary Paprock (1868)
- The New King Arthur: An Opera Without Music by Edgar Fawcett (1885)
- The Marriage of Guinevere: A Tragedy by Richard Hovey (1891)
- The Quest of Merlin: A Prelude by Richard Hovey (1891)
- King Arthur by J. Comyns Carr, with music by Arthur Sullivan (1895)
- The Birth of Galahad by Richard Hovey (1898)
- Taliesin: A Masque by Richard Hovey (1900)
- Tristam & Iseult by J. Comyns Carr (1906)
- Guenevere: A Play in Five Acts by Stark Young (1906)
- Mordred, A Tragedy in Five Acts by Wilfred Cambell (1908)

==== Modern verse plays ====
- The Tragedy of Arthur by Arthur Phillips (2011) produced by Guerilla Shakespeare Project in NYC
- Guenevere: A Tragedy, by John Richardson (ISBN 9781079298826) is a tragedy in one act written in the mid-1980s and first staged in 2017 in Edmonton, Canada as part of the Walterdale Theatre's Cradle to Stage festival. Guenevere was revived at the 2018 Edmonton International Fringe Festival. Guenevere has the structure of a Classic Greek Tragedy and tells the story of final days of Camelot through the eyes of Queen Guenevere as she watches from her exile to a nunnery.
- The Table Round and The Siege Perilous by Emily C. A. Snyder (2019) produced by Turn to Flesh Productions in NYC

== Opera ==
- Henry Purcell: King Arthur (1691), libretto by John Dryden
- Richard Wagner: Lohengrin (1848), libretto by composer
- Richard Wagner: Tristan und Isolde (1865), libretto by composer
- Richard Wagner: Parsifal (1882), libretto by composer
- Karl Goldmark: Merlin (1886), libretto by Siegfried Lipiner
- Hubert Parry: Guinevere (1886)
- Amadeu Vives: Arthús (1895)
- Isaac Albéniz: Merlin (1897–1902), intended to be the first of a trilogy, libretto by Francis Money-Coutts, 5th Baron Latymer
- Ernest Chausson: Le roi Arthus (1903), libretto by composer
- Rutland Boughton: The Round Table (1916), libretto by Richard Buckley and the composer
- Rutland Boughton: The Birth of Arthur (1920), libretto by Reginald Buckley and the composer
- Rutland Boughton: The Lily Maid (1934), libretto by the composer
- Rutland Boughton: Galahad, libretto by the composer
- Rutland Boughton: Avalon, libretto by the composer
- Harrison Birtwistle: Gawain (1991), libretto by David Harsent

== Film ==
=== English-language theatrical films ===
Relatively straightforward adaptations of the legends, reconstructed history, or modern Arthurian material.

==== Adaptations of the original Arthurian Legend ====
These films are generally based on Matter of Britain, which are set in the medieval time period with King Arthur as the main character.

- The Adventures of Sir Galahad (1949), a film serial starring George Reeves, most known for playing Superman, as Sir Galahad as he attempts to keep Excalibur safe from the evil Saxons and Merlin's magic with the help of Morgan La Fey.
- Knights of the Round Table (1953), a film based on Le Morte d'Arthur, directed by Richard Thorpe with Robert Taylor as Lancelot, Ava Gardner as Guinevere, and Mel Ferrer in the role of Arthur.
- The Black Knight (1954), a film starring Alan Ladd as the titular Black Knight, a blacksmith named John who creates an alter ego to go after the men who are responsible for killing the mother of the woman he loves who are led by the traitorous Sir Palamides, played by Peter Cushing.
- Lancelot and Guinevere a.k.a. Sword of Lancelot (1963), a film directed by Cornel Wilde, who also stars as Lancelot, with Jean Wallace as Guinevere, and Brian Aherne as Arthur.
- Siege of the Saxons (1963), a British film inspired by the plot of Robin Hood in which King Arthur is killed by Edmund of Cornwall as he attempts to usurp Arthur's throne, but Arthur's daughter Katherine (played by Janette Scott) is able to escape with the help of a thieving archer named Robert Marshall (played by Ronald Lewis) who only steals from the rich.
- Camelot (1967), a film adaptation of the Broadway musical which is based on the novels The Ill-Made Knight and The Candle in the Wind from T.H. White's Once and Future King series. The film is directed by Joshua Logan and stars Richard Harris as Arthur, Vanessa Redgrave as Guinevere, and Franco Nero as Lancelot.
- Lancelot du Lac (1974), a film by Robert Bresson based on Arthurian legend, the Lancelot-Grail cycle and the works of Chrétien de Troyes, with Vladimir Antolek-Oresek as Arthur, Luc Simon as Lancelot and Laura Duke Condominas as Guinevere.
- Excalibur (1981), a film by John Boorman based largely on Le Morte D'Arthur, featuring Nicol Williamson as Merlin and Helen Mirren as Morgana, with Nigel Terry as Arthur, Nicholas Clay as Lancelot, Cherie Lunghi as Guinevere, Patrick Stewart as King Leodegrance and Liam Neeson as Gawain.
- First Knight (1995) is based on the abduction of Guinevere by the knight Malagant. It featured Sean Connery as Arthur, Richard Gere as Lancelot, and Julia Ormond as Guinevere.
- Sir Lanval (2011), a film adaptation of the late 12th century narrative poem by Marie de France. Lanval is a young knight at Arthur's court who attracts the attention of both Queen Guinevere and an otherworldly fairy maiden.
- Arthur and Merlin (2015), Arthur (Kirk Barker) is a banished Celtic warrior, and Merlin (Stefan Butler) a hermit wizard. (direct-to-video)
- King Arthur: Legend of the Sword (2017) is a live-action film which follows a young Arthur who is learning how to master the sword Caliburn and fight his way back as rightful heir and king of ancient Britain. Charlie Hunnam played the titular role.

==== Adaptations of Tristan legend ====
English language films that are based on the legend of Tristan and Iseult, which originated in the 12th century:

- Tristan & Isolde (2006) a film adaptation of the legend produced by Ridley Scott and his brother Tony Scott and directed by Kevin Reynolds, starring James Franco as Tristan and Sophia Myles as Isolde.

==== Adaptations of Sir Gawain and the Green Knight ====
Sir Gawain and the Green Knight (Middle English: Sir Gawayn and þe Grene Knyȝt) is a late 14th-century Middle English chivalric romance. It is one of the best known Arthurian stories, the following films are directly based on the romance:

- Gawain and the Green Knight (1973)
- Sword of the Valiant: The Legend of Sir Gawain and the Green Knight (1984)
- The Green Knight (2021)

==== Films based on A Connecticut Yankee in King Arthur's Court ====
Films based on Mark Twain's novel A Connecticut Yankee in King Arthur's Court, about a modern man/woman who travels in time to Arthur's period.

- A Connecticut Yankee in King Arthur's Court (1921)
- A Connecticut Yankee (1931) first sound film adaptation of Twain's novel, with Will Rogers as the time-traveling Yankee and William Farnum as Arthur.
- A Connecticut Yankee in King Arthur's Court (1949), a musical film adaptation of Twain's novel, with Bing Crosby as the time-traveling Yankee and Cedric Hardwicke as Arthur.
- Unidentified Flying Oddball, aka The Spaceman and King Arthur or A Spaceman in King Arthur's Court (1979)
- A Kid in King Arthur's Court (1995)
- A Knight in Camelot (1998)
- Black Knight (2001)

==== Films based on Prince Valiant ====
Prince Valiant is an American comic strip set within the Arthurian Legend. The following films were based on the comic strip:

- Prince Valiant (1954)
- Prince Valiant (1997)

==== Films set in the Roman Empire ====
These films generally feature King Arthur, in Roman Empire settings and as the main character.

- King Arthur (2004) a motion picture claiming to be more historically accurate (that was heavily criticised for its historical inaccuracies) about the legend of Arthur as a 5th-century, British-born, Roman commander, with respect to new archaeological findings; similar in story line to Jack Whyte's books.
- The Last Legion (2007) a historical fantasy in which Roman Emperor Romulus Augustulus is Arthur's father and Excalibur is Julius Caesar's sword.
- Pendragon: Sword of His Father (2008) (direct-to-video)

==== Animated films ====
- Knight-mare Hare (1955), Looney Tunes animated short with Bugs Bunny taking on Arthurian legend.
- Knighty Knight Bugs (1958), Looney Tunes animated short with Bugs Bunny taking on Arthurian legend.
- The Sword in the Stone, a 1963 Disney animated film about Arthur's childhood, loosely adapted from T.H. White's novel of the same name.
- Willy McBean and his Magic Machine (1965), a stop-motion animated film loosely based on Arthurian Legend.
- Pound Puppies and the Legend of Big Paw (1988) contains an early scene taking place in the "Dark Ages" and featuring a young Arthur as he finds Excalibur and becomes king.
- Quest for Camelot (1998), with King Arthur ruling over a besieged Camelot.
- Shrek the Third (2007), a parody of the Arthurian legend.
- Scooby-Doo! The Sword and the Scoob (2021), a Scooby-Doo direct-to-DVD film taking on the Arthurian legend.

==== Modernization and parodies ====
Productions whose plot "updates" or otherwise moves the legend to modern times.

- Parsifal (1904) (based on Wagner opera)
- Knights of the Square Table (1917)
- King Arthur Was a Gentleman (1942)
- Squareheads of the Round Table (1948)
- Knutzy Knights (1954)
- Monty Python and the Holy Grail (1975), a comedic parody of the traditional King Arthur legend. It was later adapted into a successful Broadway musical called Spamalot. Arthur was played by Graham Chapman in the film.
- Knightriders (1981)
- The Fisher King (1991)
- Army of Darkness (1992), the third film in the Evil Dead trilogy sees the protagonist, Ash, sent back to medieval Britain where he defends Lord Arthur from an army of the dead.
- Seaview Knights (1994) (direct-to-video)
- Kids of the Round Table (1995)
- Merlin's Shop of Mystical Wonders (1996) (direct-to-video)
- The Mighty (1998)
- Merlin: The Return (2000)
- The Sorcerer's Apprentice (2001)
- The Sorcerer's Apprentice (2010)
- Merlin and the War of the Dragons (2008) (direct-to-video)
- Transformers: The Last Knight (2017)
- The Kid Who Would Be King (2019)
- Hellboy (2019)

=== Foreign-language films ===
Foreign-language films based on the medieval Arthurian legends:

- Lancelot du Lac (France, 1974)
- Perceval le Gallois (France, 1978)
- Kaamelott: The First Chapter (France, 2021)

==== Films based on Richard Wagner's Parsifal ====
Foreign-language films that are based on Wagner opera:

- The Evil Forest (Spain, 1951)
- Parsifal (France & West Germany, 1982)

==== Films based on the Tristan legend ====
Foreign-language films that are based on the legend of Tristan and Iseult

- L'Éternel retour (France, 1943)
- Feuer und Schwert (West Germany, 1981)
- La Femme d'à côté (France, 1981) (modern-day adaptation of the Tristan Legend)
- In the Shadow of the Raven (Iceland, 1988)
- Pardes (India, 1997) (modern-day adaptation of the Tristan Legend)

==== Other films ====
Foreign-language animation, derivative works, parodies and modern settings:

- New Adventures of a Yankee in King Arthur's Court (USSR, 1988) A Soviet adaptation of Mark Twain's novel A Connecticut Yankee in King Arthur's Court
- Avalon (Poland & Japan, 2001) (A parody film that updates the legend to modern settings)

== Television ==
=== English-language live-action television series and films ===
==== Television films and specials ====
- Camelot (1982), a videotaped stage performance of the Broadway musical based on T.H. White's The Once and Future King series, presented on HBO.
- Guinevere (1994), A Lifetime Television movie based on the Arthurian legend. The story is told from Queen Guinevere's point of view, presenting her as the driving force behind the success of Camelot.
- The 2004 History Channel special Quest for King Arthur, hosted by Patrick Stewart, with an introduction by Ioan Gruffudd, highlights several historical figures who may have contributed to Arthurian legend. It was shown on the History Channel just prior to the release of the 2004 film King Arthur, which featured Gruffudd as the character Lancelot and doing a voice-over introduction. The obvious tie-in was to assert the historical accuracy of the film.

==== Television films and specials, modernization and parodies ====
- Once Upon a Classic: "A Connecticut Yankee in King Arthur's Court" (TV film, 1978) – an adaptation of Mark Twain's novel with Paul Ryan Rudd as Hank/Sir Boss, Richard Basehart as King Arthur and Roscoe Lee Browne as Merlin.
- Merlin and the Sword a.k.a. Arthur the King (1985) is an American television movie that was filmed in 1982 about a woman falling into an icy cave at Stonehenge and waking up in Arthurian times.
- Merlin and the Dragons (1991)
- The Four Diamonds (1995)
- The Excalibur Kid (1999)
- Avalon High (2010), Britt Robertson is cast as Arthur. The setting of this Disney Channel Original Movie is a mix of battle sequences and a high school setting. Allie Pennington, (Robertson) learns she is the reincarnation of the legendary king.

==== Television miniseries ====
- The Legend of King Arthur (1979), a BBC adaptation of the story produced by Ken Riddington and starring Andrew Burt as Arthur
- Merlin (1998) expands on Arthurian legend from Merlin's perspective, starring Sam Neill.
- The Mists of Avalon (2001), a feminist retelling based on the Marion Zimmer Bradley novel, produced by TNT, with Julianna Margulies as Morgaine, Anjelica Huston as The Lady of the Lake, and Samantha Mathis as Gwenhwyfar
- Merlin's Apprentice (2006), a loose adaptation set after the death of Arthur, a sequel for Sam Neill as the wizard

==== Television series ====
- The 1950s British television series The Adventures of Sir Lancelot (1956–57), recounts the knight's exploits and stars William Russell as the titular character, most known for his role as Ian Chesterton in Doctor Who. It featured Arthur and many other characters from the legends and it was the first British television series ever to be made in colour (although surviving episodes of season 1 are in black and white), and one of the first to be aired by an American network. Although it suffered low ratings due to CBS's Burns and Allen airing at the same time slot.
- The 1970s British television series, Arthur of the Britons (1972–1973), starring Oliver Tobias, sought to create a more "realistic" portrait of the period and to explain the origins of some of the myths about the Celtic leader.
- Merlin (2008–2012) is the BBC's second Arthurian adaptation after the 1979 mini-series, this time a retelling following a young Merlin and Arthur (played by Colin Morgan and Bradley James, respectively) and their journey towards fulfilling their destiny.
- Camelot is a series on Starz which is an adaptation of Le Morte D'Arthur that debuted February 25, 2011. It begins at the very earliest story with twenty-year-old Arthur (Jamie Campbell Bower), long-lost son of Uther Pendragon, being crowned king and pulling the Sword of Mars from a stone after his half-sister Morgan (Eva Green) poisons their father. A more adult-oriented take on the Arthurian legends than the concurrent series Merlin, it was cancelled after one season because of many scheduling conflicts of the cast and showrunners.
- Cursed (2020) is a Netflix adaptation of the Frank Miller graphic novel of the same name, following Nimue (Katherine Langford) who wields Excalibur and Arthur (Devon Terrell) who is a sellsword.

==== Television series, modernization and parodies ====
- Raven (1977)
- Mr. Merlin (1981–82), Merlin lives in modern times.
- Small World (1988)
- Doctor Who – Battlefield (1988–1989)
- Sir Gadabout: The Worst Knight in the Land (2002–2003), a children's spoof of the Arthurian legend
- Stargate SG-1, seasons 9 to 10 (2006–2007)
- The BBC series Merlin (2008–2012) is a re-imagining of the legend in which the future King Arthur and Merlin are young contemporaries in Uther's kingdom. Arthur quickly transitions from a spoiled young prince into a beloved king, while Merlin perfects his magic arts in secret. Inspired by Smallville (which was a similar show featuring Superman characters) and the subject of critical acclaim, Merlin ran for five series.
- The ABC series Once Upon a Time (2011–2018) features many aspects from the Arthurian legends. Camelot is mentioned several times as a region within the Enchanted Forest. Also, Lancelot appears in the second and fifth seasons. In the fifth season, the heroes seek out the sorcerer Merlin to battle the darkness that currently plagues hero-turned-villain Emma Swan. In the third episode of the season, King Arthur (portrayed once again by Liam Garrigan) is revealed to be a villain. As the season progresses, his villainous acts are discovered by the heroes, including his killing of Merida's father, but he is eventually defeated and imprisoned. Towards the end of the season, he is killed by the god of the Underworld, Hades, and is sent to the Underworld. It is there he encounters a deceased Killian Jones, and they work together to help the heroes in the living realm defeat Hades. With the underworld in disarray, Arthur realizes a prophecy he heard that he would repair a broken kingdom wasn't talking about Camelot, but the Underworld. He then bids Killian farewell, and hopes to redeem himself by helping the souls of the deceased.
- The Canadian TV show Guinevere Jones (2002) features a reincarnation of Guinevere who is helped by the spirit of Merlin to learn magic and fight against Morgana, and dealing with high school problems.
- The first season of the American television show The Librarians is centered on the efforts of an elderly Lancelot (using his last name, Dulaque, as an alias) to restore Camelot, which he considers to be a golden age of humanity. He manages to release magic back into the world using Excalibur in the second episode, ("And The Sword In the Stone"), and eventually uses a collection of artifacts gathered by the Librarians to access the Loom of Fate, which he tampers with to restore his youth and restart history at the beginning of Camelot. However, Galahad (who has assumed the identity of the Library's caretaker, Jenkins), returns and distracts him long enough for the Librarians to undo the damage, causing Lancelot to disappear.

=== Animation ===
==== Television films and specials ====
- "A Connecticut Yankee in King Arthur's Court" (1970) was an animated early segment of the Famous Classic Tales specials, produced by the Hanna-Barbera Australian subsidiary, Air Programs International
- A Connecticut Rabbit in King Arthur's Court (1978), also known as Bugs Bunny in King Arthur's Court, a Looney Tunes TV special.
- A Connecticut Mouse in King Arthur's Court (1980), an episode of The Tom and Jerry Comedy Show.

==== Television series ====
- The Australian animated cartoon series Arthur! and the Square Knights of the Round Table (1966–1968) was a typically wacky take on Arthurian legend.
- In Sabrina the Animated Series episode "Hexcalibur" features Harvey Kinkle as the young King Arthur voiced by Bill Switzer (very loose adaptation)
- The animated series The Legend of Prince Valiant (1991–1993) followed the adventures of three young warriors training to become Knights of the Round Table. The series featured Arthur, Merlin, Guinevere, and Gawain in its main cast and several other Arthurian characters in recurring roles.
- The animated series King Arthur & the Knights of Justice (1992–1993) featured an American football team called the Knights led by quarterback Arthur King. When the "real" Knights of the Round Table are captured, Merlin magically transports the Knights football team to Camelot to defend the kingdom and rescue the captured knights.
- Starting within its "Avalon World Tour" story arc, a few episodes of Disney's Gargoyles (1994–1997) devoted themselves partly to Arthur Pendragon, after NYPD detective Elisa Maza awakens the King from his "eternal slumber" within Avalon's "hollow hill" sanctuary. Arthur goes on to recover his sword Excalibur while visiting New York (and directly confronting Macbeth while recovering it), and while in New York, knights the London Clan gargoyle Griff to become his traveling companion from Griff's assistance to the king in recovering Excalibur, as Arthur begins a quest to find Merlin.
- Blazing Dragons (1996–1998), The series' protagonists are anthropomorphic dragons who are beset by evil humans, reversing a common story convention. The series parodies that of the King Arthur Tales as well as the periods of the Middle Ages
- Dragon Booster (2004–2006), A teenager named Artha Penn teams up with a dragon named Beau and Artha was the chosen hero called the Dragon Booster.
- The British animated cartoon series King Arthur's Disasters (2005–2006). Arthur is voiced by Rik Mayall.
- The animated series Trollhunters: Tales of Arcadia (2016–2018) features the wizard Merlin as the creator of the Trollhunter's amulet, and his arch-enemy Morgana as one of the main villains of the third season. The series Wizards: Tales of Arcadia (2020) features the return of Merlin and Morgana. Camelot also appears, as members of the main cast travel back to Arthurian times, in the process meeting King Arthur and Lancelot.
- Unicorn: Warriors Eternal follows the Order of the Unicorn, a band of reincarnating magical warriors assembled by Merlin to battle an immortal evil entity that was once Morgana.

=== Foreign-language television series and films ===
==== Live-action television series ====
- The French series Kaamelott (2005–2009) features a humorous take on the legend.
- Het huis Anubis en de vijf van het magische zwaard (Dutch Nickelodeon series, 2010–2011)

==== Animated television series ====
- King Arthur & the Knights of the Round Table (Entaku no Kishi Monogatari: Moero Arthur), a Japanese anime series produced by Toei Animation from 1979 to 1980, followed by King Arthur: Prince on White Horse (Moero Arthur: Hakuba no Oji) in 1980.
- The episode "Minnade Daietto!" (English: "Eh! History Changed!?") of the 1991 Japanese anime series Mischievous Twins: The Tales of St. Clare's deals with the abduction of Queen Guinevere by Sir Maleagant and about how she is set free by Sir Lancelot.
- The Japanese anime series Code Geass (2006–2007, 2008) featured The Knights of the Round, a unit of twelve elite knights in the Holy Empire of Britannia, each being assigned into the group by royalty and under direct command of the Emperor. Each knights pilot a Knightmare Frame, a humanoid shaped war machine. Their Knightmare Frame were named after the Arthurian Knights such as Lancelot, Gawain, and Tristan. The capital city of the Holy Britannian Empire, Pendragon, is also named after King Arthur's surname.
- In the Japanese anime adaptation of the visual novel Fate/Stay Night (2006, 2014–2015), Arthur is portrayed as having been a woman (named Artoria/Altria) whose spirit is resurrected to serve a mage in the modern day as "Saber", with history recording her as a man for political correctness. She reprises this role in the adaptation's prequel Fate/Zero (2011–2012), which also features a version of Lancelot. Artoria also appears in the film Fate/Stay Night: Unlimited Blade Works (2010), and a recreated anime series (2014–2015) based on the latter, as well as a number of spinoffs based on the franchise. In addition, the OVA Fate/Prototype (2011) (based on an earlier draft of Fate/Stay Night's story) features a male version of King Arthur, known in the expanded universe as "Prototype Saber", often shortened to "Proto-Saber". Meanwhile, Fate/Apocrypha (2017) features Mordred as a Saber-class familiar, wielding the sword Clarent.
- The Japanese anime Highschool DxD (2012, 2013, 2015, 2018), the Arthurian legend also plays an important factor in the series such as the Welsh Dragon, the White dragon and King Arthur's dual swords Excalibur and Caliburn, Merlin the wizard of Arthurian Legend was stated to be one of the most important pioneer of magic, two of the main character were direct descendants of King Arthur, Arthur Pendragon and Le Fay Pendragon, the latter being the love interest of the protagonist Issei Hyoudou.
- Arthur serves as the main antagonist in the Japanese anime Nobunaga the Fool (2014). The anime is a sci-fi telling of famed ancient heroes from the west, such as Arthur, Caesar, and Alexander, going to war against famed ancient heroes from the east, such as Nobunaga, Mitsuhide, and Kenshin over control over two planets, both of which represent Europe and Japan.
- In Season 2 Episode 15 "The Queen of the Lake" (2014) of Japanese anime Sword Art Online, the main cast is given a quest to save an ancient race of elves from which the main characters races branch from. The reward for the quest is the item known as Excalibur, a legendary sword from Arthurian lore.
- The Seven Deadly Sins (2014–2020) is loosely based on Arthurian Legend, set in and around Liones and Camelot, and featuring reimagined versions of Arthur, Merlin, and Viviane as supporting characters.
  - Its sequel Four Knights of the Apocalypse is also based on the Arthurian Legends.
- Divine Gate (2016), Japanese anime based on the Smart phone game of same name, which retelling of Arthurian legend.
- A sword-wielding character named Arthur appears in David Production's anime adaptation of the manga series Fire Force by Atsushi Ohkubo. As his pyrokinetic ability, he wields a sword named Excalibur whose blade is made of plasma. Believing himself to be a knight, his power increases as these convictions grow.

== Audio ==
- The Sword in the Stone, a six-part BBC Radio series written by Marianne Helweg based on the book by T. H. White and broadcast on BBC National Programme 11 June to 16 July 1939, with Robert Farquharson as Merlyn, Robin Maule as "Wart", Norman Shelley as Sir Ector, Carleton Hobbs as Archimedes and Geoffrey Wincott as King Pellinorer.
- The Sword in the Stone, a 1952 BBC Home Service adaptation by Marianne Helweg of T.H. White's novel, with Peter Ustinov as Merlyn, Jeremy Spenser as "Wart", Norman Shelley as Sir Ector, Geoffrey Wincott as King Pellinore and Patience Collier as Madame Mim.
- Tale Spinners for Children: "The Knights of the Round Table" (UAC 11005) (1962), a recorded dramatization of the Arthurian legend starring Derek Hart, concentrating mostly on Sir Lancelot; certain events were simplified or changed to make the story more child-friendly (for instance, Mordred is merely an evil knight and the love affair between Lancelot and Guinevere is changed to make it an evil rumor spread by a henchman of Sir Mordred's to compromise Lancelot and Guinevere, resulting in their being framed when Lancelot is tricked into visiting the Queen in her chamber) and providing a happy ending.
- The Sword in the Stone, a 1981 BBC Radio 4 adaptation by Neville Teller of T.H. White's novel, with Michael Hordern as Merlyn, Toby Robertson as "Wart", David Gooderson as King Pellinore and Josephine Gordon as Madame Mim.
- Arthur – the King, a seven-part BBC Radio series written by Graeme Fife and broadcast on BBC Radio 4 11 November to 23 December 1990, with Keith Baxter as Arthur, Paul Scofield as Merlin, Anna Massey as Morgan le Fay, Nicholas Farrell as Lancelot and Jill Balcon as Guinevere.
- A Stone From Heaven, a radio play in two parts ("The Wounding" and "The Healing", both broadcast on 15 April 1995) written by Lindsay Clarke, focusing on the Grail story and on Parsifal and Gawain, with Ian Jeffs as Parsifal, Michael Lumsden as Gawain, Gary Bond as Arthur, Eleanor Bron as Cunrie, Diana Quick as Orguleuse and Edward Petherbridge as Trevrizant.
- Arthur, a six-part BBC Radio series written by Sebastian Baczkiewicz and Steve May and broadcast on BBC Radio 4's Afternoon Play 22 October to 26 November 2004, with Philip Glenister as Arthur, Ben Whishaw as young Arthur, Ian McDiarmid as Merlin, Jane Lapotaire as Morgan, Andrew Scarborough as Lanslot and Eve Myles as Gwenfar.
- The Once and Future King, a six-part BBC Radio series written by Brian Sibley based on the book by T. H. White and broadcast on BBC Radio 4 9 November to 14 December 2014, with Paul Ready as Arthur, David Warner as Merlyn, Alex Waldmann as Lancelot and Lyndsey Marshal as Guinever.

== Paintings ==
- Morgan le Fay, Frederick Sandys, 1864
- The Beguiling of Merlin, Edward Burne-Jones, 1872–1877
- The Last Sleep of Arthur in Avalon, Edward Burne-Jones, 1881–1898
- The Lady of Shalott, John William Waterhouse, 1888
- The Lady of Shalott Looking at Lancelot, John William Waterhouse, 1894
- Queen Guinevere's Maying, John Collier, 1897
- I Am Half-Sick of Shadows, Said the Lady of Shalott, John William Waterhouse, 1915

== Tapestry ==
- Holy Grail tapestries

== Advertising ==
King Arthur is the namesake of a brand of flour, King Arthur Flour.

== Games ==
=== Board games ===
- The board game Shadows Over Camelot features King Arthur as one of the main playable characters in the game.
- In the science fiction miniature game Warhammer 40k, the Emperor of Mankind drew many similar inspiration from Arthurian legends while the treacherous Warmaster Horus and Horus Heresy is similar to Mordred.
- In the fantasy miniature game Warhammer Fantasy Battle, the background of Bretonnia is strongly based on Arthurian legends, including the Grail and the Lady of the Lake.
- King Arthur alongside many of his knights appear under stylized names in the card game Yugioh in the "Knight of the Round Table" set. Merlin, the Lady of the Lake and Avalon are also referenced.

=== Role-playing games ===
- The role-playing game Pendragon details how to run adventure games set in the time of the Round Table. Its setting integrates Malory with post-Roman Britain, Celtic myth and English Folklore.
- In Rifts from Palladium Books, the main story of Britain revolves around the future equivalent of King Arthur and his knights. This is not the original King Arthur awoken from Avalon and he has many different characteristics and strengths, not the least of which is his new blade, Calibur-X, a vibrating gun blade with magical properties.
- The King Arthur Supplement for the GURPS role-playing game gives three different Arthurian settings, a historical setting based upon post-Roman Britain, a legendary setting based upon Malory, and a cinematic setting based upon modern stories.

=== Video games ===
- Sir Lancelot is used as character in a 1984 platform / arcade game for the Sinclair ZX Spectrum.
- Conquests of Camelot (1990) by Sierra Entertainment centers around the quest for the Holy Grail.
- Knights of the Round (1991) by Capcom is a light-hearted take on the Arthurian legend in a sword fighting beat-em-up similar to the video game Final Fight.
- Bio-Hazard Battle (1992) the plots mention Avalon is another planet to be contaminated by bio-hazard warfare.
- Young Merlin, a 1994 Super NES game.
- King Arthur & the Knights of Justice (1995) by Enix is based on the cartoon series of the same name.
- The Soul series (Started 1995) by Namco features Arthur as a samurai. He wields a katana named Gassan.
- Blazing Dragons (1996) by Crystal Dynamics and Nelvana in that the game controls Flicker, a young inventor in Camel-hot who dreamed about becoming a knight. It is based on the cartoon TV series of the same name.
- In Final Fantasy VII (1997), the final and most powerful summon materia is Knights of the Round which has 12 knights striking an enemy with the last knight obviously being King Arthur through his extended entrance and grander appearance.
- Age of Empires II: The Age of Kings (1999): King Arthur represented by a champion infantry.
- Fire Emblem: The Binding Blade (2002): a tactical JRPG contains many characters whose names allude to the King Arthur legend. Although there is no Arthur, characters include: Guinevere, Igraine, Gorlois, Lance, Percival, Uther, Lot, Bors, Merlinus, Niime and Nacien. The game's prequel, Fire Emblem: The Blazing Blade, introduces Ninian, but on the whole this game draws more from medieval French mythology than British and Arthurian.
- Legion: The Legend of Excalibur by 7 Studios, a 2002 real-time strategy and action role-playing hybrid with the player controlling one of the Knights of the Round Table and few warrior groups to fight against evil Morgan Le Fay's undead army.
- Fate/stay night (2004), a visual novel/eroge and anime, features a young female knight called Saber whose true name is Artoria/Altria Pendragon. She became King by pulling free the sword from the stone. Knowing that armies wouldn't follow a woman, she renamed herself King Arthur and used Merlin's magic to hide her gender. Bedivere attends to her as she is dying.
  - Fate/Zero (2006), a prequel, features not only the above King Arthur/Saber, but also Lancelot as a Black Knight under the class Berserker.
  - The spinoff game Fate/extra (2010) features Gawain as an enemy-exclusive Saber-class character.
  - The light-novel series Fate/Apocrypha (2012) – a parallel world spinoff based on a cancelled MMO concept features Mordred as a Saber-class for one of the two factions, who, like King Arthur/Saber, is gender-swapped, detailed in the story as being a homunculus half-clone of King Arthur that was created from mixing the King's genes with those of Morgan le Fay. Mordred wields the sword Clarent.
  - All of the aforementioned characters would later appear in the mobile game Fate/Grand Order (2015) alongside versions of Galahad, Gareth, Agravaine and Tristan. Lancelot would come to have another version summonable as the Saber-class in which he is sane, unlike his Berserker form. Artoria would also receive multiple versions of her character, notably a Lancer-class version wielding the spear Rhongomyniad, in addition to corrupted Alter forms and an alternate-universe male form known as "Proto-Saber".
- King Arthur by Krome Studios is based on the 2004 film of the same name.
- Ace Combat Zero: The Belkan War, a 2006 Namco game, is heavily based on the Arthurian legend, with allusions to Excalibur, Avalon, etc.
- Stronghold Legends (2006) by Firefly Studios; campaign includes King Arthur's legend.
- Tomb Raider: Legend (2006) by Crystal Dynamics revolves around the King Arthur legend resembling those of other cultures around the world; pieces of artifacts are forms of Excalibur.
  - Tomb Raider: Underworld (2008) by Crystal Dynamics revolves around Lara trying to find Avalon to find her mother.
- Excalibur: Morgana's Revenge, a real time strategy and role-playing game by ExcaliburWorld Software from 2007.
- King Arthur: The Role-playing Wargame a real time strategy and role-playing game by Neocore Games from 2009.
  - King Arthur: Knight's Tale (2022) by NeocoreGames is a tactical role-playing game with a dark fantasy version of Arthurian legend where King Arthur is mad and you play as Mordred trying to stop him.
  - King Arthur: Legion IX (2024) – a turn-based TRPG with a Roman theme, set in the universe of King Arthur: Knight's Tale.
- Sonic and the Black Knight (2009) on Wii features the main protagonist, Sonic the Hedgehog saving the city Camelot from King Arthur after he becomes corrupt and calls himself the Black Knight. After defeating the Black Knight/King Arthur, Merlin's granddaughter Merlina reveals to Sonic & the Knight of the Roundtable that the King Arthur they knew was a fake created by her grandfather. In the end, Sonic was revealed to be King Arthur himself, as Caliburn (actually Excalibur) said he was the one who decides who is worthy of the crown.
- SMITE, a 2014 free-to-play game.
- The Order: 1886, story in this 2015 action adventure depicts the Knights of the Round Table in steampunk London battling to keep the world safe from supernatural breeds and enemy organisations.
- Pendragon, a 2020 narrative game by Inkle (company).
- Assassin's Creed Valhalla, a 2020 Assassin's Creed instalment set in Anglo-Saxon England and focusing on Vikings invaders. Players are able to acquire tablets from various sites across the England map, some of which are connected to Arthurian Legend. Players then head to Myrddin's (Merlin's) Cave, where they can use the tablets to reveal the sword Excalibur. Sir Gareth's Holy Sword, the sword of one of the Knights of the Round Table, can also be acquired in-game.
- Tainted Grail: Conquest (Ex-Tainted Grail in 2020) (2021), a 3D, turn-based, roguelike deck-building game in a dark fantasy world of Avalon. It is adapted from the 2019 board game, Tainted Grail: The Fall of Avalon.
  - Tainted Grail: The Fall of Avalon (2025), an epic first-person, open-world RPG in the Tainted Grail lore, set long after King Arthur's death.
- Cassette Beasts (2023) features Aleph, a character heavily based on Arthurian legends, as well as formerly going by the name Arthur.

==== MMOs ====
- Dark Age of Camelot (DAoC), a massively multiplayer online game created by Mythic Entertainment. A role-playing game with elements of Arthurian legend, released in 2001. The story takes place after King Arthur's death.
- RuneScape (2001), a MMORPG, King Arthur and the Knights of the Round Table are portrayed as having settled in the game's fictional world while awaiting Britain's 'time of greatest need'.
- Wizard101 (2008): Morganthe's Arc, Avalon story line (Arc 2 World 3) (video game)
- Kingdoms of Camelot (KoC), a massively multiplayer online, real-time strategy, browser game created by Canadian studio Kabam. A build and warfare game, released in 2009 and linked to Facebook Game platform.

== Music ==
- The concept album The Myths and Legends of King Arthur and the Knights of the Round Table (1975) by Rick Wakeman tells a version of the legend.
- The 1986 concept album The Legend by Italo Disco singer Valerie Dore.
- The 1995 album Imaginations from the Other Side and 2015 album Beyond the Red Mirror by the power-metal band Blind Guardian contain numerous songs referencing Arthurian legends, including "A Past and Future Secret", about the battle of Camlann, "Mordred's Song", and "The Holy Grail".
- The 2004 expanded edition of heavy metal singer Bruce Dickinson's 6th solo album The Chemical Wedding features a song called "Return of the King," which heavily references Arthurian elements including Uther Pendragon.
- The American power-metal band Kamelot has many songs with Arthurian elements in their discography.(Once and Future King and Shadow of Uther
- In 2003 hard rock musician Gary Hughes put out two albums, Once and Future King Part I and Once and Future King Part II, based on the legend.
- The German metal band Grave Digger released a concept album about the story of King Arthur called Excalibur
- English folk singer Maddy Prior released a 2001 concept album Arthur the King
- The 1995 album The Final Experiment by Ayreon, its concept is located in King Arthur's timeline.
- England-based metal band Cradle of Filth released their song "Haunted Shores" in 2014, which deals with the subject of King Arthur from a pagan perspective.
- Korean pop band Kingdom (group) released their top song "Excalibur" in 2021 as their debut single. As well as "Excalibur" they released songs "Black Crown" and "Long Live the King" which are less obviously influenced by Arthurian legend. Along with their songs, their debut album is titled History Of Kingdom: pt.I. Arthur which is named after band member Arthur and a reference to Arthur Pendragon.

== Anthem of Cornwall ==
- Bro Goth Agan Tasow ("Dear Land of Our Fathers"), the official anthem of Cornwall, includes the words: "Kingdom of King Arthur, ancient saints and the Grail/No other land is more beloved."

== See also ==
- Lists of films
- Fiction featuring Merlin
