= Guinevere (1994 film) =

- Home video cover art
- Genre: Adventure; Fantasy
- Written by: Persia Woolley
- Story by: Ronni Kern
- Directed by: Jud Taylor
- Starring: Sheryl Lee; Sean Patrick Flanery; Noah Wyle; Brid Brennan; Donald Pleasence; James Greene
- Theme music composer: Johnny Harris
- Country of origin: United States
- Original language: English

Production
- Executive producers: Les Alexander; Don Enright
- Production location: Vilnius
- Cinematography: Gábor Szabó
- Running time: 96 minutes
- Production companies: Alexander/Enright & Associates; Hearst Entertainment; Lietuvos Kinostudija; Weintraub/Kuhn Productions

Original release
- Network: Lifetime
- Release: May 7, 1994

Guinevere is a 1994 Lifetime television film based on the Arthurian legend. The story is told from Queen Guinevere's point of view, presenting her as the driving force behind the success of Camelot. It was adapted from author Persia Woolley's Guinevere trilogy of novels: Child of the Northern Spring, Queen of the Summer Stars, and Guinevere: The Legend in Autumn.

== See also ==
- List of films based on Arthurian legend
