= Accolon =

- Matter of Britain character
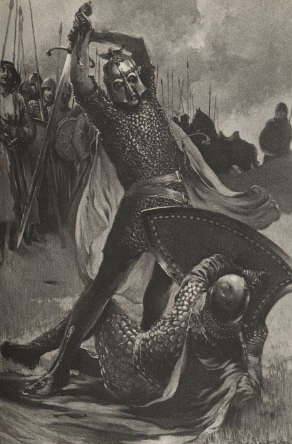
- Accolon fights Arthur in Eric Pape's illustration for Madison Cawein's 1889 poem "Accolon of Gaul" (1907)
- First appearance: Post-Vulgate Suite de Merlin

In-universe information
- Occupation: Knight
- Significant other: Morgan le Fay

Accolon /ˈækəlɒn/ is a character in Arthurian legend. A knight of King Arthur's court and tragic lover of Morgan le Fay, he appears in works associated with the Post-Vulgate Cycle, including as Accalon in the French original Huth Merlin and Acalón in the Spanish adaptation El Baladro del Sabe Merlin.

== Medieval literature ==
In Thomas Malory's compilation Le Morte d'Arthur, Accolon is referred to as Sir Accolon of Gaul. He is a paramour of, and object of desire for, Morgan le Fay, King Arthur's half-sister. As described in Accolon's original story in the Post-Vulgate Suite de Merlin that was Malory's source: "She loved him so madly that she desired to kill her husband [King Urien] and her brother [King Arthur], for she thought she could make Accolon king, either by the devil's help or by magic or by entreaty of the nobles of Great Britain." Malory describes them loving each other "out of measure" (oute of mesure), similar to how Palamedes loves Isolde or how Lancelot is beloved by many women.

At an early stage in Malory's book, Accolon is hunting together with King Arthur and King Urien when they become lost while chasing a white hart and are forced to camp in the woods. After they came upon and board Morgan's fairy boat, Accolon awakens in a field where Morgan appears and gives him the magic sword Excalibur, which Arthur had earlier entrusted to her. She tells him he must use the weapon in his next fight with a mysterious swordsman who is actually Arthur, himself wielding a sword he believes to be Excalibur but which was actually a fake given to him by Morgan. Neither man recognises the other but Accolon gains the upper hand due to wielding the real Excalibur, as well as its also magical scabbard, together giving its user the near invincibility in battle. During the duel, Arthur's sword breaks; he quickly realises this was not the real Excalibur and that he has been betrayed. Rather than giving up, Arthur continues to fight with what was left of his shield. Nimue the Lady of the Lake (other names in the Post-Vulgate) arrives in the last minute and uses her magic to cause Excalibur to fly from Accolon's hand. Arthur then wrestles the scabbard back and deals Accolon a mortal wound. At the same time, Morgan tries to personally murder the sleeping Urien, her husband, but is stopped by their own son Yvain. When Arthur finally recognises Accolon and learns of Morgan's part in the plot, he assures his friend that he would not be punished if he lives, however Accolon dies from his wound four days later.

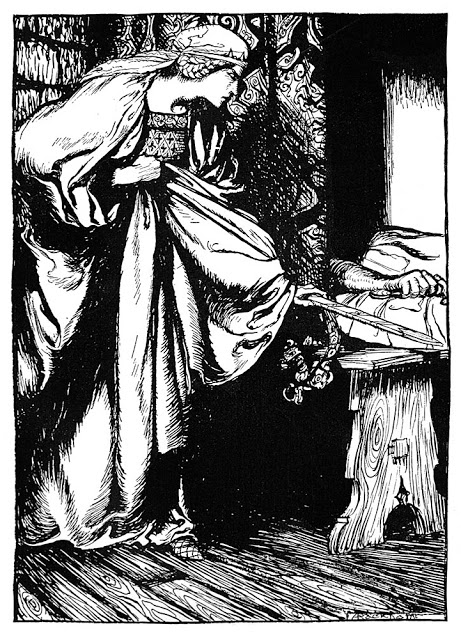
Arthur Rackham's "How Queen Morgan le Fay stole away the scabbard from Arthur." An illustration for The Romance of King Arthur (1917), abridged from Malory by Alfred W. Pollard

Accolon's body is sent by Arthur to Morgan, at the time still at Camelot, who grieves after him greatly. She takes revenge on Arthur by stealing Excalibur's protective scabbard (arguably more valuable than the sword itself) and then losing it to the world forever by throwing it into an enchanted lake. Later, Morgan also comes upon Arthur's knight named Manassen (Manessen) who is in deadly peril (about to be drowned in a well by another knight who claims Manassen is guilty of adultery with his wife). When Morgan learns Manassen was Accolon's cousin, she saves him and even enables him to drown his enemy, which he gladly does.

== Modern Arthuriana ==
The episode of his fight with Arthur is included in many modern retellings and adaptations of Malory, such as Mary Stewart's The Last Enchantment (1979) and Persia Woolley's Queen of the Summer Stars (1990). He was portrayed by Anthony Dutton in the 1979 television series The Legend of King Arthur.

John Steinbeck in The Acts of King Arthur and His Noble Knights (1976) writes that Morgan "beguiled Accolon with promises, [and] canceled his conscience with his lust." In Stewert's telling, "whether Morgan desires or merely uses the love-struck Accolon is not clear [...] but Morgan is obviously in control of him." In Jerzy Kosiński's modern-day Passion Play (1979), the Accolon figure is represented by the character of Costeiro.

In Marion Zimmer Bradley's The Mists of Avalon (1982), the role of Nimue omitted. Here, Morgan and Accolon's aim is to restore the pre-Roman Celtic pagan religion, threatened by the aggressive advent of Christianity. Accolon is the second son of her husband Uriens and a knight loyal to Avalon. He becomes Morgan's lover when she is the Queen of North Wales, performing pagan rituals together. She wants him to kill King Arthur and so restore the power of Avalon, but Arthur slays him in direct combat; when Morgan's role becomes evident, she is disgraced. The novel's Accolon was portrayed by Ian Duncan in its 2000 television adaptation.

In Nancy McKenzie's The High Queen (1995), the duel is provoked by Morgan's accusations towards Guinevere and Lancelot. In Fay Sampson's short story "Just Cause", the episode is re-told from the point of view of Morgan's son Uwain, "changed by Morgan's magic into the white hart that leads Arthur, Accolon, and Uriens to the magic ship. Morgan also sends Uwain to take the false Excalibur to Arthur. And it is Uwain, with Morgan, who seizes the scabbard and disposes of it, ensuring a limit to Arthur's reign."

== See also ==
- Lamorak, tragic lover of Morgan's sister
