= Van Meter, Iowa =

- City
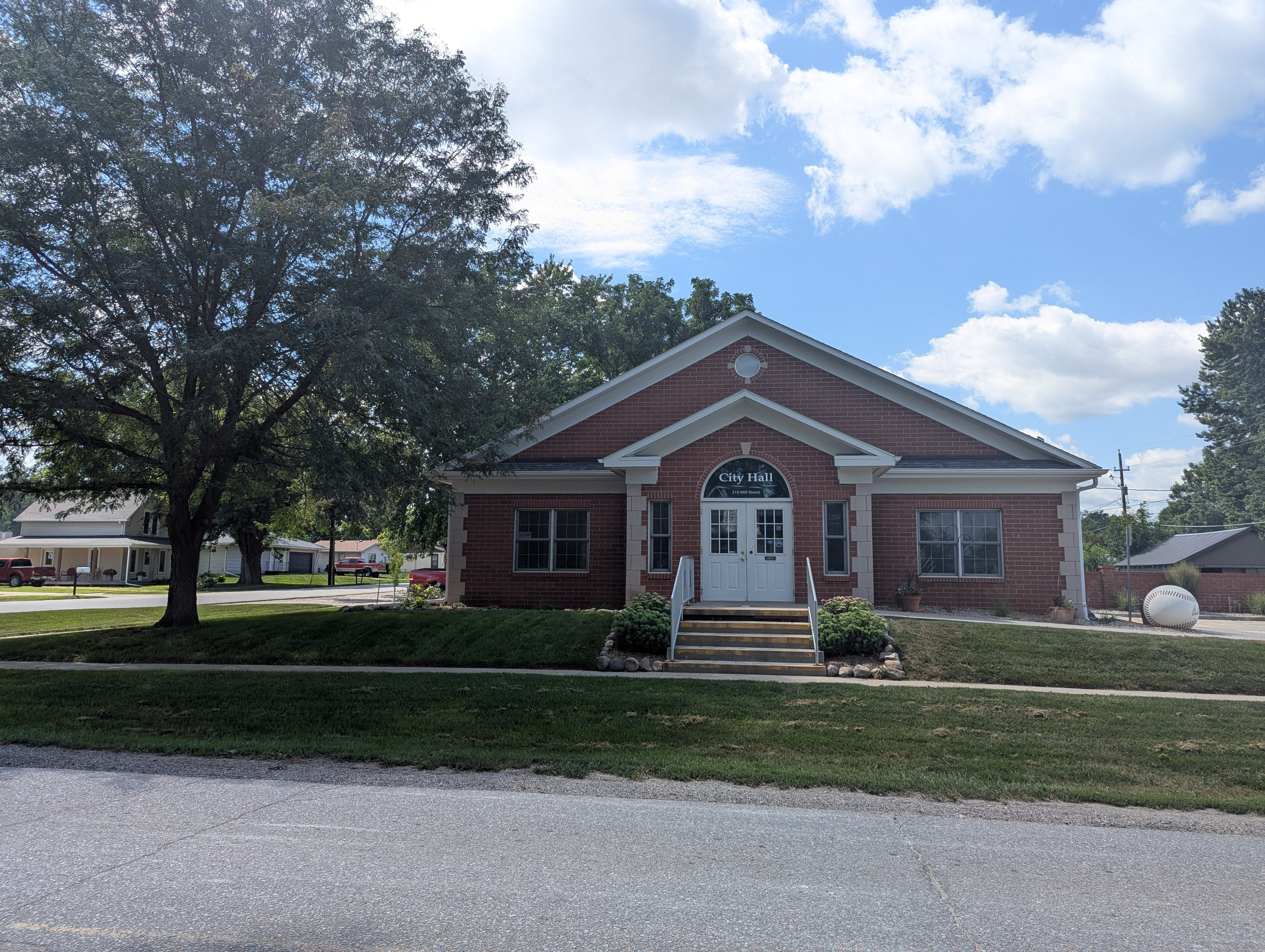
- Van Meter city hall
- Motto: "Tradition with a Vision"
- Location of Van Meter, Iowa
- Coordinates: 41°31′09″N 93°56′35″W
- Country: United States
- State: Iowa
- County: Dallas

Area
  - Total: 2.34 sq mi (6.05 km^{2})
  - Land: 2.31 sq mi (5.99 km^{2})
  - Water: 0.019 sq mi (0.05 km^{2})
- Elevation: 981 ft (299 m)

Population (2020)
  - Total: 1,484
  - Density: 642/sq mi (247.7/km^{2})
- Time zone: UTC-6 (Central (CST))
  - Summer (DST): UTC-5 (CDT)
- ZIP code: 50261
- Area code: 515
- FIPS code: 19-80445
- GNIS feature ID: 2397116
- Website: www.vanmeteria.gov

Van Meter is a city in Dallas County, Iowa, United States, situated along the Raccoon River. The population was 1,484 at the time of the 2020 census. Van Meter is part of the Des Moines–West Des Moines Metropolitan Statistical Area.

== History ==
Van Meter was laid out as a town in 1869. The city was named for Jacob Rhodes Van Meter and his family, Dutch settlers from Meteren, the Netherlands. Van Meter was incorporated on December 29, 1877.

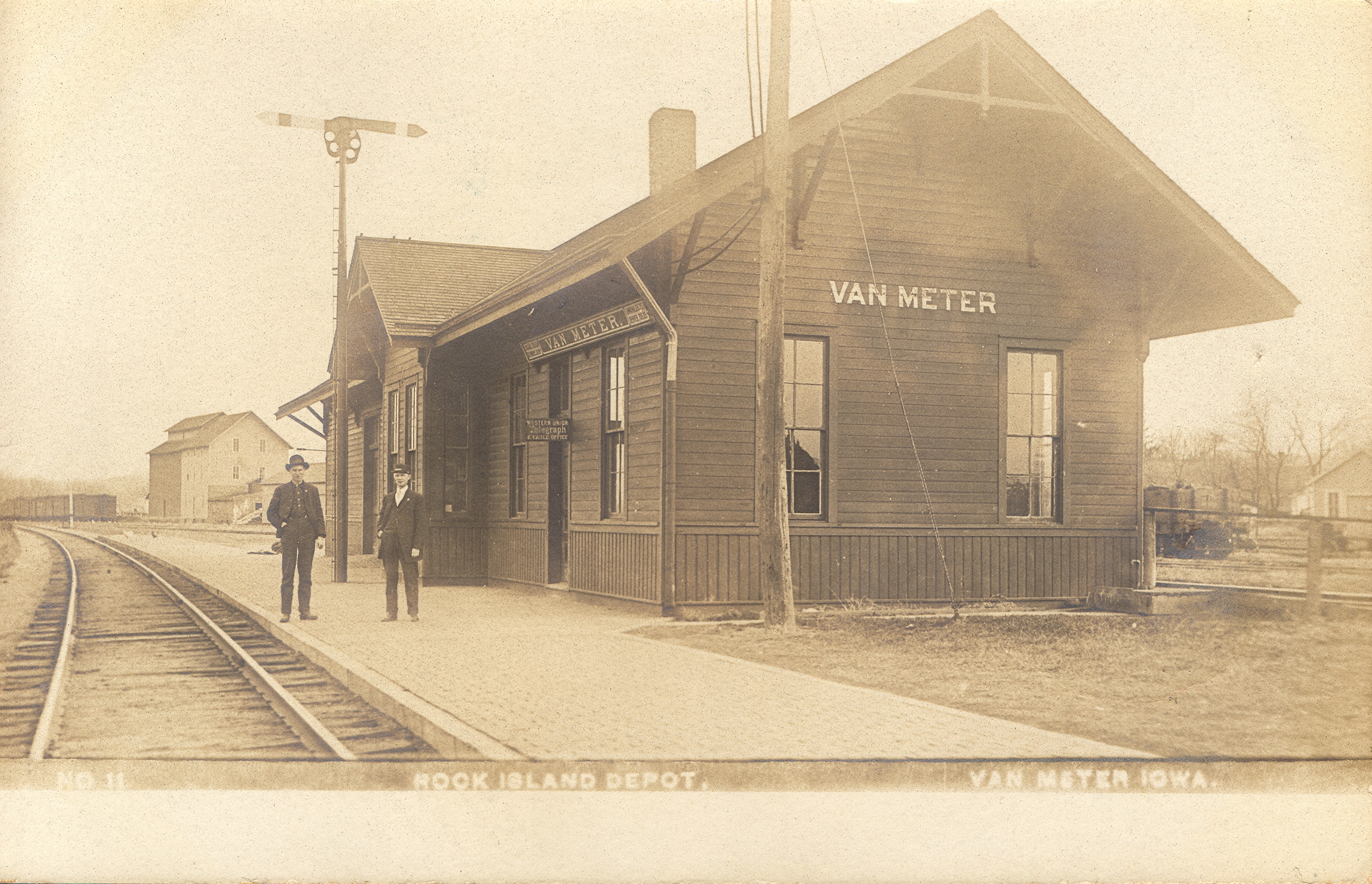
Rock Island Depot, Van Meter, Iowa

The Van Meter Visitor is a local legend that arose from 1903 newspaper reports of people claiming to have seen a winged, bat-like creature in and around Van Meter, reported to be able to shoot light from the horn situated on its forehead and be unaffected by bullets.

The legend includes modern-day claims of sightings, with the Van Meter Visitor Festival held annually around the anniversary of alleged events, attracting tourist business for the town.

== Geography ==
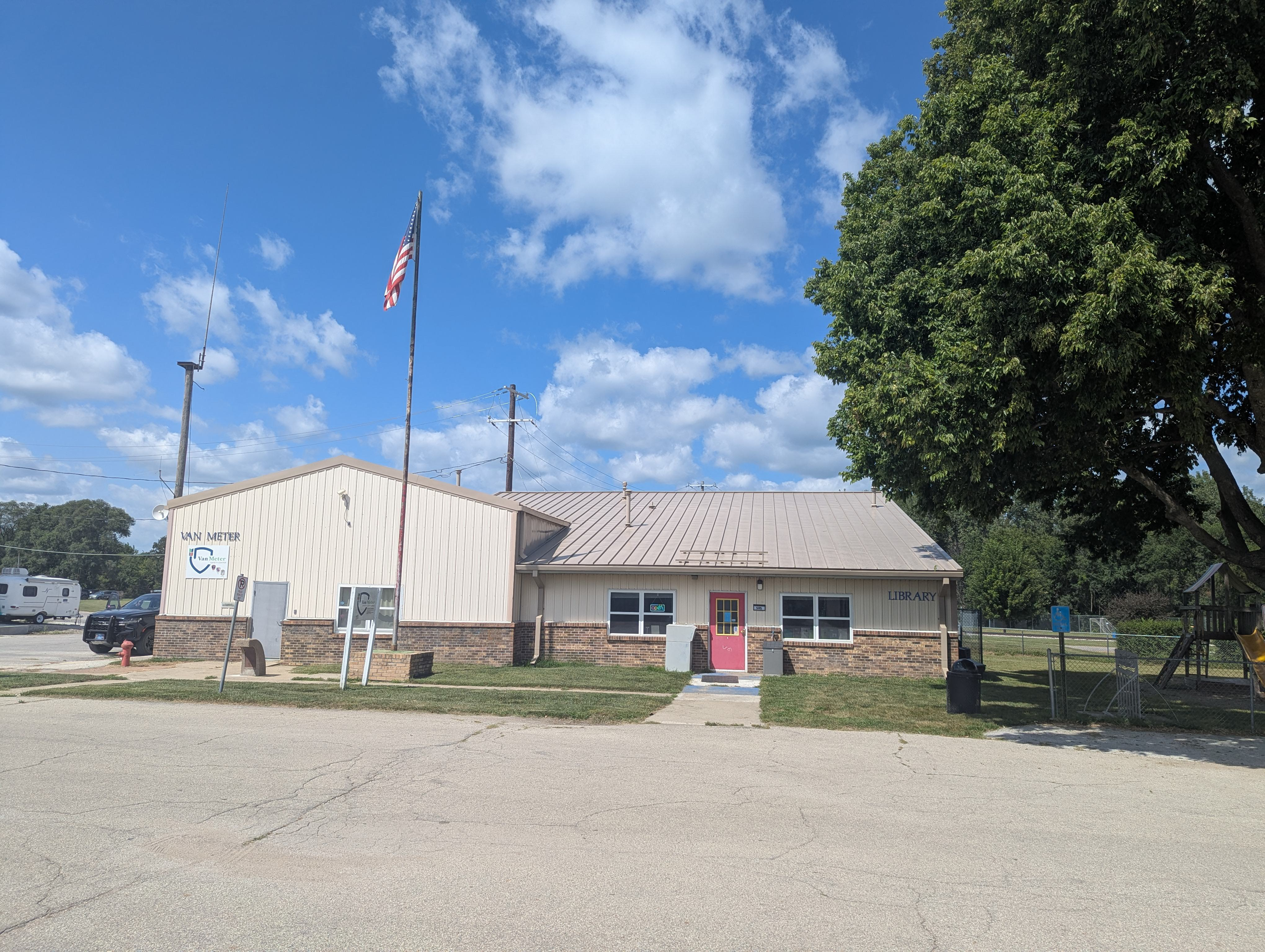
Van Meter Safety Center (left) and library (right)

According to the United States Census Bureau, the city has a total area of 1.30 square miles (3.37 km^{2}), of which 1.28 square miles (3.32 km^{2}) is land and 0.02 square miles (0.05 km^{2}) is water.

Van Meter is situated west of Des Moines, just south of Interstate 80.

== Demographics ==
Historical populations
Year	Pop.	±%
1880	376	—
1890	467	+24.2%
1900	407	−12.8%
1910	386	−5.2%
1920	358	−7.3%
1930	400	+11.7%
1940	436	+9.0%
1950	364	−16.5%
1960	385	+5.8%
1970	464	+20.5%
1980	747	+61.0%
1990	751	+0.5%
2000	866	+15.3%
2010	1,016	+17.3%
2020	1,484	+46.1%
Source:"U.S. Census website". United States Census Bureau. and Iowa Data Center; Source: U.S. Decennial Census

=== 2020 census ===
As of the 2020 census, Van Meter had a population of 1,484, with 513 households and 402 families residing in the city.

The population density was 641.5 inhabitants per square mile (247.7/km^{2}). There were 538 housing units at an average density of 232.6 per square mile (89.8/km^{2}).

The median age was 34.8 years. 34.0% of residents were under the age of 20, 4.4% were from 20 to 24, 29.0% were from 25 to 44, 21.8% were from 45 to 64, and 10.8% were 65 years of age or older. 31.8% of residents were under the age of 18. The gender makeup of the city was 50.5% male and 49.5% female. For every 100 females, there were 102.2 males, and for every 100 females age 18 and over, there were 95.0 males age 18 and over.

0.0% of residents lived in urban areas and 100.0% lived in rural areas.

Of households in Van Meter, 46.4% had children under the age of 18 living with them, 61.8% were married-couple households, 7.6% were cohabiting-couple households, 20.3% had a female householder with no spouse or partner present, and 10.3% had a male householder with no spouse or partner present. About 21.6% of households were non-families, 17.5% were made up of individuals, and 6.3% had someone living alone who was 65 years of age or older.

Of housing units in Van Meter, 4.6% were vacant. The homeowner vacancy rate was 0.9% and the rental vacancy rate was 10.8%.

Racial composition as of the 2020 census
Race	Number	Percent
White	1,404	94.6%
Black or African American	6	0.4%
American Indian and Alaska Native	8	0.5%
Asian	10	0.7%
Native Hawaiian and Other Pacific Islander	0	0.0%
Some other race	9	0.6%
Two or more races	47	3.2%
Hispanic or Latino (of any race)	22	1.5%

=== 2010 census ===
As of the census of 2010, there were 1,016 people, 382 households, and 280 families residing in the city. The population density was 793.8 inhabitants per square mile (306.5/km^{2}). There were 415 housing units at an average density of 324.2 per square mile (125.2/km^{2}). The racial makeup of the city was 97.9% White, 0.2% African American, 0.2% Native American, 0.6% Asian, and 1.1% from two or more races. Hispanic or Latino of any race were 0.6% of the population.

There were 382 households, of which 45.8% had children under the age of 18 living with them, 51.3% were married couples living together, 14.4% had a female householder with no husband present, 7.6% had a male householder with no wife present, and 26.7% were non-families. 22.3% of all households were made up of individuals, and 6.8% had someone living alone who was 65 years of age or older. The average household size was 2.66 and the average family size was 3.09.

The median age in the city was 35.5 years. 31.7% of residents were under the age of 18; 5.9% were between the ages of 18 and 24; 27.4% were from 25 to 44; 26.4% were from 45 to 64; and 8.7% were 65 years of age or older. The gender makeup of the city was 49.5% male and 50.5% female.

=== 2000 census ===
As of the census of 2000, there were 866 people, 326 households, and 237 families residing in the city. The population density was 1,450.3 inhabitants per square mile (560.0/km^{2}). There were 342 housing units at an average density of 572.8 per square mile (221.2/km^{2}). The racial makeup of the city was 98.15% White, 0.23% African American, 0.69% Asian, 0.23% Pacific Islander, 0.23% from other races, and 0.46% from two or more races. Hispanic or Latino of any race were 1.39% of the population.

There were 326 households, out of which 41.1% had children under the age of 18 living with them, 59.2% were married couples living together, 11.3% had a female householder with no husband present, and 27.0% were non-families. 20.9% of all households were made up of individuals, and 3.7% had someone living alone who was 65 years of age or older. The average household size was 2.66 and the average family size was 3.13.

In the city, the population was spread out, with 30.5% under the age of 18, 6.8% from 18 to 24, 33.4% from 25 to 44, 21.4% from 45 to 64, and 8.0% who were 65 years of age or older. The median age was 35 years. For every 100 females, there were 92.0 males. For every 100 females age 18 and over, there were 88.1 males.

The median income for a household in the city was $50,625, and the median income for a family was $59,000. Males had a median income of $37,895 versus $26,023 for females. The per capita income for the city was $20,272. About 0.8% of families and 2.7% of the population were below the poverty line, including none of those under age 18 and 6.4% of those age 65 or over.

== Arts and culture ==
The Bob Feller Museum opened on June 10, 1995, in honor of Bob Feller, a National Baseball Hall of Fame pitcher and a native of Van Meter.

On November 11, 2006, Veterans Day, ground was broken for an Iowa Veterans Cemetery at a site located in the Northern part of Van Meter. Iowa Governor Tom Vilsack was among those who helped dedicate the cemetery. On November 11, 2018, a Freedom Rock was unveiled at the Iowa Veterans Cemetery.

== Education ==
The Van Meter Community School District operates local public schools.

== Notable people ==
- Myrtle Aydelotte, nurse, professor, and hospital administrator
- Derek Benz, science fiction author, The Revenge of the Shadow King.
- Bob Feller, Major League Baseball pitcher and member of Baseball Hall of Fame; born in Van Meter
- David Young, former U.S. Representative for Iowa's 3rd congressional district
