= J. S. Lewis (disambiguation) =

J. S. Lewis is the pen name of Jon Samuel Lewis.

Other people with the initials J. S. Lewis

- J. Slater Lewis (1852-1901), British engineer, inventor, business manager, and early author on management and accounting

== See also ==
- C. S. Lewis
