= Sprig =

Sprig may refer to:

- Sprig (agriculture), a type of plant cutting used for propagation
- Sprig (Grey Griffins), a fictional character from the Grey Griffins series
- Sprig, another name for the bird northern pintail (Anas acuta)
- Sprig Plantar, a fictional character in the American animated series Amphibia
