= Van Meter Visitor =

Legendary flying creature

The Van Meter Visitor is a local legend from Van Meter, Iowa, United States. It concerns a flying creature that newspapers reported being seen over several nights in September and October 1903.

== Origins ==
The initial story ran in the Des Moines Daily News and was subsequently retold and embroidered by other newspapers. According to the tale, the first sighting of the creature occurred on 29 September 1903, when a local toolmaker saw a strange light, moving over the roofs of various businesses in the town. The toolmaker, one U.G Griffith, was not believed as he told the story the next day. However, Dr. A.C Olcott was woken up that night when a bright light shone on his face; he grabbed a shotgun and saw the creature, which reportedly had wings akin to a bat and a blunt, horn-like protrusion from which the strange light shone in the middle of its head. The creature had a foul odor, which nearly overpowered the doctor, who fired his gun and then fled into his office to wait out the night.

Blake Smith, in an article for Skeptoid, characterized the story as typical of sensationalized accounts appearing in newspapers of the period, which "regularly reported encounters with flying serpents, winged reptiles, and other monstrous hybrids across the Midwest and West, from the 1860s through the early 1900s". According to Smith, newspaper reports from the era indicate many Van Meter residents were dismissive of the monster story, and he adds: "the original author — Van Meter local Harry H. Phillips — might have just made the whole thing up".

== Legacy ==
The episode was the subject of a 2013 book, The Van Meter Visitor. The authors approached residents about starting a festival, and Van Meter has since held the annual Van Meter Visitor Festival, which draws several hundred visitors for talks and guided tours of the sites named in the 1903 reports. Organizers say some residents embrace the story as a “fun and interesting legend” while others dismiss it as "a complete hoax".
