= The Mists of Avalon (miniseries) =

- The Mists of Avalon DVD cover
- Genre: Fantasy
- Based on: The Mists of Avalon by Marion Zimmer Bradley
- Screenplay by: Gavin Scott
- Story by: Marion Zimmer Bradley
- Directed by: Uli Edel
- Starring: Anjelica Huston; Julianna Margulies; Joan Allen; Samantha Mathis; Edward Atterton; Michael Vartan
- Theme music composer: Lee Holdridge

Production
- Producers: Gideon Amir; Bernd Eichinger
- Cinematography: Vilmos Zsigmond
- Editors: Michael H. Friedlander; Benjamin A. Weissman
- Running time: 183 minutes
- Production companies: Constantin Film; Stillking Films; Turner Network Television; Wolper Organization

Original release
- Network: TNT
- Release: July 15 – July 16, 2001

The Mists of Avalon is a 2001 television miniseries based on the 1983 novel of the same title by Marion Zimmer Bradley. The series, produced by American cable channel TNT, adapted by Gavin Scott, and directed by Uli Edel, retells the Arthurian legend from the perspectives of Morgan le Fay and other women in the tale. The first episode was the highest-rated original film on basic cable in the summer of 2001.

== Plot ==
=== Part I: Igraine and Uther ===
The film begins with a battered, dirty, and injured Morgaine riding in a small boat through a misty river. Most of the film is a reflection through her eyes, with Morgaine as narrator.

Morgaine (aged 8) is living with her pagan mother Igraine and Christian father Gorlois, the Duke and Duchess of Cornwall. Igraine's younger sister, Morgause, lives with them.

Their eldest sister, Viviane, the Lady of the Lake, High Priestess of Avalon, along with Merlin, as the chief Druid, has come to Igraine with a prophecy that she will bear the king who is destined to beat the Saxons. Igraine is distressed after being told that the child will not be Gorlois', and she refuses to bear the heir. Merlin explains that the father of the great king would be wearing a dragon on his arm, but Igraine will not agree to do their bidding. Morgause offers herself to surrogate the child, citing that she also carries the bloodline of Avalon, but Viviane dismisses her. Morgaine has a vision, seeing her father dead. Viviane notes that Morgaine has the supernatural ability of premonition called "the Sight".

The High King, Ambrosius, summons his nobles to a feast to name his successor, Uther Pendragon. Igraine is immediately drawn to Uther; Gorlois interrupts their discussion jealously.

After Uther is crowned, Gorlois rebels against him. He rides out to battle in Cameldun, but secretly takes his troops at night where Uther Pendragon is stationed.

At the island of Avalon, Viviane uses a scrying spell to warn Igraine against Gorlois. Igraine, who is romantically infatuated sends a message via astral projection to Uther. The next day, Morgaine and her aunt Morgause find that Gorlois has ordered his guards not to let the women out, or any men other than himself in. Merlin and Uther arrive, and Merlin puts a glamour charm on Uther to make him appear and sound like Gorlois. At first, Morgaine is thankful her father is alive, but she noticed the dragon tattoo of the man's arm and begins to understand that this man is actually Uther. Later, when Gorlois' corpse arrives, Morgause ignores the commotion, since the man who delivered Gorlois' body, King Lot of Orkney, takes notice of her, and she falls in love. Uther takes both Morgaine and Igraine to Camelot, where Igraine gives birth to Arthur Pendragon.

=== Part II: Morgaine is taken to Avalon ===
Arthur and Morgaine grow up loving each other dearly. When Arthur is five and Morgaine is thirteen, Viviane and Merlin return, saying that it is time to take Arthur away for his training with Merlin as future king. Viviane then orders Morgaine to come with her to Avalon to be trained as a priestess. Igraine and Uther do not want Morgaine to go, but Viviane threatens to withdraw Avalon's support of Uther, and Morgaine and Arthur are taken away from Camelot. Arthur and Morgaine are torn apart tearfully from each other, Arthur heading north with Merlin, and Morgaine heading south with Viviane. Viviane then takes Morgaine behind a misty curtain into a utopian island, Avalon. Viviane trains Morgaine to gain power of the elements, and in the servitude of the Three-fold Goddess. It takes ten years for Morgaine to be initiated, her final test being to part the mists. Igraine has a distressful vision of Morgaine "being taken".

Soon after her initiation, Morgaine meets her cousin Lancelot (whose mother is Viviane), a handsome and bold warrior. He has come to seek his mother's blessing in battle, but she is reluctant to give it. Morgaine shows him a stone circle, and she begins to fall in love with him. Lancelot sees through the misty veil a few Christian nuns and some virgin postulants walking down a path. One of them strays and seems as if she is aware of Avalon's existence on a parallel plane of existence. Lancelot begs Morgaine to open the mists for her, and she does so. The postulant is startled, but quickly smitten with Lancelot, as Lancelot is with her. The girl's name is Gwenhwyfar, daughter of King Lœdekrans. Morgaine immediately dislikes Gwenhwyfar, and closes the mists on her, separating them. Lancelot, annoyed, decides to defy his mother and leaves.

A few days later, on Beltane, Viviane sends Morgaine to be a part of a fertility rite as "The Virgin Huntress", where Morgaine is to make love to the man who kills the king's stag. Both partners are masked, so neither knows who the other is; still afterward, Morgaine longs for it to be Lancelot, but believes she will never be certain.

=== Part III: Arthur is crowned ===
Arthur, having completed his training with Merlin, finds his father, Uther, in a battle against the Saxons, just before he dies. He is locked in a burning church, and Arthur calls to both God and Goddess for help. Viviane, on behalf of the Goddess, answers, and gives Arthur Excalibur in exchange for loyalty to Avalon and paganism as well as Christianity. Arthur quickly agrees, and defeats the Saxons.

Morgaine is finally released from Avalon and returns to Camelot for her brother's coronation. She reunites first with Morgause, who is now Queen of Orkney and has a teenage son, Gawain. She then finds her mother, old and worn, sitting by a window with the Bishop Patrick. Igraine says that she is becoming a Christian nun and moving to Glastonbury. She says that she will not love again after being twice widowed, and wants to seek forgiveness for betraying Gorlois long ago. Morgaine is startled by this news and distressed.

Meanwhile, Arthur has been given a Christian princess as his bride. As Arthur introduces his bride to Lancelot, she is revealed to be Gwenhwyfar. Lancelot and Gwenhwyfar are bewildered by this twist of fate, and have an awkward first meeting. Arthur then happily reunites with Morgaine and reveals that he was the King's Stag at the Beltane feast. Morgaine, shocked that she'd made passionate love to her own brother, cries in despair and shame. In a brief scene, Morgause is seen performing an infertility curse on Gwenhwyfar, a woman "she has decided to hate", cursing her to barrenness.

Arthur is crowned king under both the Pendragon and Christian banners. The Bishop Patrick then weds him to Gwenhwyfar; Merlin and Viviane appear startled, this union seemingly unexpected even to them. Morgause whispers to her husband that Gwenhwyfar will never have children, making her son Gawain next in line to the throne. Morgaine feels sick and quickly leaves the celebration. Morgause follows her; Morgaine reveals that she is pregnant but does not mention that Arthur is the father. Morgause is surprised—Morgaine's baby would inherit the crown before Gawain.

Arthur is called away soon after his coronation, leaving Gwenhwyfar in Lancelot's care. They go riding one day, only to be attacked by Saxons. Lancelot saves Gwenhwyfar from being raped, and they hide. Gwenhwyfar and Lancelot kiss, but vow that their loyalties are to Arthur first, not each other, and they swear to never have an affair.

=== Part IV: Mordred is born ===
Morgause concocts a potion to help Morgaine abort her pregnancy. Viviane stops Morgaine before she can drink it. Morgause warns Morgaine to never be Viviane's pawn. Morgaine is furious with Viviane for letting this abomination happen: a bastard child fathered by her own brother. Viviane wants this baby to be Arthur's heir, whose pagan roots would make him the greatest ruler Britain has ever seen. Morgaine renounces Viviane and Avalon, and moves to Orkney with Morgause. In the middle of winter, Morgaine gives birth to a son, Mordred. Morgause is advised by her husband, Lot, to kill the child. Indeed, Morgause has ample opportunity to kill him, as Morgaine is unconscious due to a fever she develops after childbirth. She sets Mordred in front of a cold open window. Morgaine suddenly calls out in her fever that Arthur is the father. Morgause gets a new idea and saves the baby and takes him to be nursed. She tells her husband that she will tutor and raise Mordred so the boy will have her influence. She also breastfeeds Mordred for the first time herself.

=== Part V: Morgaine returns to Camelot ===
This begins the second part of the miniseries. Morgaine, convinced by Morgause, decides to return to Camelot. Arthur has become the great king everyone has hoped for, and Gwenhwyfar is beginning to grow distressed at her inability to produce the son Arthur needs to succeed him. Arthur assures Gwenhwyfar that they are still young and have years to bear children.

Morgaine returns to Camelot and is greeted by Arthur. She is introduced to Sir Accolon, a pagan Knight of the Round Table and son of the elderly pagan King Uriens of North Wales. Accolon and Morgaine are drawn to each other. Meanwhile, Lancelot is dealing with increased stress over Gwenhwyfar and his growing desire for her. Gwenhwyfar, obsessed with bearing children, resorts to asking Morgaine for a fertility charm. Morgaine obliges, and gives her the charm on the night of Beltane.

On the night of Beltane, at a feast, Arthur gets very drunk. Meanwhile, Morgaine, feeling insulted by Arthur's lewd remarks towards paganism, leaves the feast and rides out towards the field where the pagans light the Beltane fires and dance. Accolon follows her outside. Arthur, in the meantime, is taken to bed, barely awake, by a spirited Lancelot and Gwenhwyfar. Arthur then brings up how he notices Lancelot and Gwenhwyfar looking at each other, and how Gwenhwyfar has no child. Arthur, blaming the lack of an heir on himself, suggests that Gwenhwyfar sleep with both him and Lancelot in the hopes of conceiving the needed heir. Arthur emphasizes that Gwenhwyfar will be able to swear that the child was conceived in the king's bed. Lancelot and Gwenhwyfar are both skeptical, but Arthur persuades them, and they all bed down together. Meanwhile, Morgaine and Accolon kiss amongst the dancing pagans.

The next day, Lancelot is feeling regret for what he has done with Gwenhwyfar and Arthur. Morgaine realizes that Lancelot will never love her, so she devises an alternative to Lancelot feeling regret and sadness all his life. Gwenhwyfar has, by this time, gotten her period, and therefore still remains barren. Her serving woman, Elaine, is ecstatic, as Lancelot (encouraged by Morgaine) has asked her to marry him (she was previously seen looking at him). Gwenhwyfar, angered and distressed, dismisses her. Gwenhwyfar is also annoyed at Morgaine, who promised the charm would work, and resents Arthur for insisting the threesome would work.

At Lancelot and Elaine's wedding, Morgaine speaks with Merlin. Viviane is absent from her son's wedding, as the pagan banners of Pendragon have been taken down from Camelot due to Gwenhwyfar being hysterically upset with the "painted savages". Meanwhile, King Uriens discusses taking a second wife with Arthur, and out of spite, Gwenhwyfar suggests Morgaine. Arthur is not too keen on the idea, but he and Gwenhwyfar ask Morgaine. Gwenhwyfar carefully words the proposal, and Morgaine thinks it is Accolon proposing, and accepts. She only finds out too late that she was engaged to the father, and not the son. Morgaine realizes it would be disastrous to embarrass Uriens by rejecting the marriage, as Wales is an important political ally. Merlin, upset by Morgaine leaving Camelot with Uriens, leaves the feast.

=== Part VI: Mordred learns his paternity and birthright ===
Merlin, upon returning to Avalon, dies of old age and tiredness, with Viviane horribly upset, and Avalon filling with mist. Morgaine, ironically, finds her marriage to Uriens to be the few happy years her life would bring her. With Uriens and Accolon, for the first time in her life, she feels like part of a family.

Meanwhile, in Scotland, Mordred, Morgaine's son by Arthur, has grown to manhood. Viviane comes to him in an apparition at the forest and tells him of his being next in line for the throne. Mordred takes this to heart and tells Morgause (whom he called "Mother") he is going to claim his birthright. When he arrives in Camelot, Arthur is planning to turn back the Saxons, who have come on Britain again in force. Mordred makes himself known to Arthur only as his nephew, his mother being Morgaine. Arthur is not told Mordred is his son, and Mordred is welcomed with open arms into Camelot.

King Uriens dies, and Morgaine decides to go back to Avalon. Her entourage is attacked by the Saxons but escapes with injury, but upon arriving at the border gate, the mists will not open for her, and Morgaine believes the Goddess has forsaken her. In despair, she crouches in the boat and lets herself float, only to be found by Igraine at the moat of Glastonbury convent, as she remains alive and living among the nuns. The women have a brief but happy reunion.

Mordred and Arthur, overlooking the knights one day, begin a discussion about the next heir. Mordred insists Arthur should name someone, but Arthur still believes Gwenhwyfar might still bear a son. Mordred insists he choose someone before Arthur dies in battle. Arthur says he needs someone of his own descent. It is here that Mordred reveals himself as Arthur's son and that Morgaine was the "Virgin Huntress" whom he copulated with from many years ago. Gwenhwyfar overhears this and runs away, embarrassed and despairing.

=== Part VII: The downfall of Camelot ===
Gwenhwyfar has fallen frantically into praying all day in her Christian chapel. One day, Lancelot meets her there, and they plan a secret rendezvous, only to have Mordred overhear. Mordred catches the pair before they sleep together, and he threatens to take both of them before the king and have them hanged for infidelity. Lancelot and Gwenhwyfar escape, and they part for the last time. Gwenhwyfar enters Glastonbury convent, where Igraine meets her. Igraine takes her to Morgaine, still living there, and both women finally make amends with each other.

Morgaine goes back to Camelot, now in ruins, with various men crucified, hanged and decapitated along the walls of the palace. Mordred, Morgaine, Viviane, and Morgause all meet on the stairs to the palace. Viviane reveals Morgause's evil for all to see, reminding the people of the true ways of the Goddess; Morgause, in anger, takes a knife to kill Viviane, but Viviane catches the knife and accidentally stabs Morgause, who falls dead. Mordred, having thought of Morgause as his real mother, takes his sword and kills Viviane in turn. Because Viviane was Lady of the Lake, the sun is eclipsed, and Igraine senses that both her sisters are dead. Back in Avalon, Raven, a priestess who had taken a vow of silence, screams vocally for the first time in despair and the mists of Avalon rise even higher, totally eclipsing the island.

A final battle at Cameldun is set to take place between the Saxons and Arthur's army. Lancelot joins him at the front lines just before the battle. Morgaine is off seeing over the cremation of Viviane and Morgause. Mordred has now betrayed Camelot and joined the Saxons and is leading them to Arthur. Morgaine sees this in a vision as the bodies of her aunts burn before her, and rides off to the battlefield. The fierce battle kills all until only Mordred and Arthur stand. Morgaine arrives all too late. She sees the dead bodies of Gawain, Accolon, and Lancelot among the thousands. Mordred and Arthur have both fatally wounded each other. Mordred dies first, in Morgaine's arms, but Arthur lingers. Arthur begs Morgaine to take him to Avalon.

=== Part VIII: A new incarnation ===
As in the opening scene of the film, Morgaine is in the boat rowing to Avalon. Arthur, barely alive, is lying in front of her; Morgaine tries to part the mists, but once again fails. Arthur holds out the sword of Excalibur, suggesting the Goddess needs an offertory. Morgaine hurls the sword into the mist, where it is mystically transformed into a cross, and temporarily opens up the mists to Avalon. Arthur sees Avalon, and Morgaine declares, "We're home!" Arthur sees the beautiful land, and then dies. As Arthur dies, the mists close permanently.

Morgaine then goes to the convent of Glastonbury – not to live as a Christian nun, but because she has nowhere else to go. She is convinced the Goddess is dead, until one day she sees a little girl praying at the feet of a statue of the former Goddess, but is now veiled as the Blessed Virgin Mary. Morgaine smiles, realizing that the Goddess has simply taken a new form, and that one day, perhaps the mists of Avalon will part again. The film ends with credits.

== Cast ==
- Anjelica Huston as Viviane, the Lady of the Lake, High Priestess of the island of Avalon
- Julianna Margulies as Morgaine, Duchess of Cornwall
- Joan Allen as Morgause, Queen of Orkney
- Samantha Mathis as Gwenhwyfar, Princess of Lœdekrans
- Caroline Goodall as Igraine, Queen of Camelot
- Edward Atterton as Arthur, the High King of Camelot
- Michael Vartan as Lancelot, Knight of Round Table
- Michael Byrne as Merlin, High Priest of the Druids
- Hans Matheson as Mordred, Prince of Cornwall and Orkney
- Mark Lewis Jones as Uther, High King of Camelot
- Clive Russell as Gorlois, Duke of Cornwall
- Tamsin Egerton as the young Morgaine, vestal priestess of Avalon
- Christopher Fulford as Lot, King of Orkney
- David Calder as Uriens, King of North Wales
- Hugh Ross as Bishop Patricius of Britain
- Edward Jewesbury as Ambrosius, King of Britain
- Freddie Highmore as young Arthur, Crown Prince of Cornwall and Britain

== Reception ==
The Mists of Avalon was watched by more than 30 million "unduplicated viewers" during its premiere; the first episode "was the highest-rated original movie of the summer on basic cable". Critical reception was mixed but generally positive. USA Today gave the miniseries three stars out of four, crediting its success to Margulies, Huston and Allen as well as Gavin Scott's adaptation. Reviews from Entertainment Weekly and the San Francisco Chronicle were also somewhat positive. Hollywood.com said simply that the series "works" and that "instead of glorifying these legendary characters, Avalon fleshes out their weaknesses, desires and ultimate failures". Kendal Butler of Culture Vulture felt that Hans Matheson as the adult Mordred "promptly walks off with the show" but that the overall production was hampered by "cheesiness" and failed to adequately convey the religious contention between the pagan beliefs and Christianity that were central to the novel.

The Mists of Avalon was nominated for an Emmy Award for Best Miniseries and Joan Allen and Anjelica Huston were nominated for Best Supporting Actress in a miniseries or movie. Margulies was nominated for a Golden Globe and Huston for a Screen Actors Guild Award.

== Home media ==
Name	Release date	Format
The Mists of Avalon	December 11, 2001	DVD/VHS

== See also ==
- List of works based on Arthurian legends
- List of historical films
