= Lancelot du Lac (film) =

1974 film by Robert Bresson

- Theatrical film poster
- Directed by: Robert Bresson
- Written by: Robert Bresson
- Based on: Lancelot-Grail Cycle
- Produced by: Jean-Pierre Rassam; Francois Rochas
- Starring: Luc Simon; Laura Duke Condominas; Humbert Balsan; Vladimir Antolek-Oresek; Patrick Bernhard
- Cinematography: Pasqualino De Santis
- Edited by: Germaine Lamy
- Music by: Philippe Sarde
- Production companies: Mara Films; Laser Productions; Office de Radiodiffusion Télévision Française; Gerico Sound
- Distributed by: CFDC (France); CIDIF (Italy)
- Release dates: 23 May 1974 (Cannes); 31 May 1974 (Italy); 26 September 1974 (France)
- Running time: 85 minutes
- Country: France; Italy
- Language: French

Lancelot du Lac is a 1974 medieval fantasy-drama film written and directed by Robert Bresson. It retells the story of Lancelot and Guinevere's love as Camelot and the Round Table fall apart. It is based on Arthurian legend and medieval romances, especially the Lancelot-Grail cycle, and the works of Chrétien de Troyes.

In common with Bresson's later films, the cast was composed of amateur actors, several of whom did not appear in any other film. Bresson's direction demanded a purposeful lack of emotion in the acting style, and reduced or eliminated the fantastical elements of the Grail legend. While much of the production is intentionally stylised as Medieval "Romance", the film is punctuated with moments of graphic violence.

== Plot ==
After many bloody adventures, King Arthur sends his knights, who have been pledged by the late magician Merlin, to retrieve the Holy Grail, which is believed to be hidden somewhere in Brittany. The mission proves futile and the knights are decimated. Among those who return two years later is Lancelot, the lover of Queen Guinevere. He is haunted by the death of his comrades and torn between his duty and his love for Guinevere. He wishes to end their affair, but Guinevere refuses. She implies that instead of being slain by enemies, the knights sent for the Grail had turned on one another, Lancelot chief among them. To make matters worse, many knights of Camelot are wary of or despise Lancelot, who is seen as a favourite, even by members of the Round Table, save for a few, among them Gawain and Lionel, who are his greatest friends among the knights' ranks. Mordred comes upon Lancelot and Guinevere's secret meeting spot and discovers her scarf there.

Lancelot, obeying once more his love for Guinevere, wishes to forgo an upcoming tournament and have a tryst with Guinevere. Gawain tries to convince him to compete, but fails. Mordred suspects Lancelot is missing the tourney to be able to meet with Guinevere. En route to the tournament, Mordred tries and fails to convince Arthur of the affair. Later on, during the tourney, a strange knight bearing a white shield appears and defeats one knight after another. Gawain and Arthur recognise the knight as Lancelot by his horse and the way he rides. Lancelot triumphs over the remaining knights, Mordred among them, before making his leave. After his departure, he staggers and falls in the forest, bleeding heavily.

Gawain is informed by the jilted Guinevere that Lancelot has "disappeared" and the knight with the white shield could not be him. Lionel, who had wounded the knight of the white shield earlier, wishes to defend Lancelot's honour, but is stopped by Gawain, who sends riders in search for Lancelot, to no avail. It is then believed that Lancelot is dead. Gawain seeks out Guinevere at her secret meeting place, but Guinevere is resigned to her love with Lancelot and refuses to leave.

Gawain departs, only to be met by Arthur accompanied by knights, including Mordred, who has informed Arthur of the affair. Arthur imprisons Guinevere in the same tower where she and Lancelot once had their meetings. Lancelot is shown to be hiding and recovering in Escalot, cared for by an elderly woman. With the help of Lionel and knights loyal to Lancelot, he rescues Guinevere, killing two knights, one of them being Agravain, Gawain's brother. Arthur starts a campaign against the castle where Lancelot and Guinevere are sheltering. The resulting battles result in many losses and casualties, among them Gawain. Despite his injuries and his brother's death, he does not begrudge his once-friend Lancelot, and says that though he and Arthur tried to save Guinevere, only Lancelot had succeeded. He dies of his wounds.

Guinevere, guilt-ridden over the blood spilt for their love, tells Lancelot to return her to Arthur, and he complies. Lancelot learns that Mordred is leading an uprising against the king, and he chooses to ride against Mordred, on Arthur's side. The resulting battle is a bloody conflict from which none survive, including Arthur and Mordred. Lancelot staggers across the battlefield and, whispering Guinevere's name, he collapses to die. The last thing he sees is a carrion crow flying above the bloodbath. (Note: Several reviewers incorrectly identify the bird as a falcon.)

== Cast ==
- Luc Simon as Lancelot du Lac
- Laura Duke Condominas as Guinièvre
- Humbert Balsan as Gauvain
- Vladimir Antolek-Oresek as Arthur
- Patrick Bernard as Mordred
- Arthur De Montalembert as Lionel
- Daniel Benoin as Giflet
- Charles Balsan
- Christian Schlumberger
- Joseph-Patrick Le Quidre
- Jean-Paul Leperlier
- Marie-Louise Buffet
- Marie-Gabrielle Cartron
- Antoine Rabaud
- Jean-Marie Becar
- Guy de Bernis
- Philippe Chleq

== Production ==
=== Casting ===
Bresson had been planning a film of the grail legend for a long period. His original choice to play Guinevere twenty years previously had been the artist Niki de Saint Phalle, the mother of Laura Duke Condominas, but the project had been delayed again and again. His final selection of Laura came about by chance when he came across a photograph of her with no prior information about who she was or that she was in fact the daughter of his first choice.

The 1996 issue of Positif reports that in 1964 Bresson wrote to George Cukor, saying he would like to make the film in English, with Natalie Wood and Burt Lancaster.

=== Filming ===
The film was shot from the end of June 1973 to the start of September 1973 in Noirmoutier-en-l'Île in the Vendée.

== Release ==
The film premiered at the 1974 Cannes Film Festival in May 1974, followed by its theatrical release in France on 26 September 1974. It had its world television premiere in West Germany on 4 May 1974.

=== Home media ===
The American film distributor New Yorker Video released a Region 1 DVD, under the title Lancelot of the Lake, in May 2004. This NTSC release has a cropped and analog-sourced version of the film from an unconverted PAL source.

The British film distributor Artificial Eye released a Region 2 DVD in April 2008. This edition has a PAL-sourced transfer of the film in superior quality to the previous NTSC release.

The French film and television production and distribution company Gaumont released a region-free PAL Blu-ray in November 2021. The Gaumont Blu-ray has the film remastered in 4K resolution from a 2018 Restoration by France's National Centre for Cinema and the Moving Image.

== Reception ==
=== Critical response ===
The film was well-received among critics, currently holding a 95% "fresh" rating on Rotten Tomatoes based on 16 reviews.

It was Michael Haneke's second-place choice in the 2012 Sight & Sound poll of the greatest films ever made.

The American film director John Waters praised the film for its "screen economy".

The film won the FIPRESCI Prize at the 1974 Cannes Film Festival. Bresson refused the award, saying (in the light of the continual funding difficulties throughout his film career), "I don't want prestige, I want money and only the Palme d'Or attracts money."

=== Influence ===
David Lowery cites this movie as one of the inspirations behind The Green Knight, the adaption of the Arthurian legend, Sir Gawain and the Green Knight.

== See also ==
- List of films based on Arthurian legend
