= Warren Murphy =

American author

- Born: Warren Burton Murphy; September 13, 1933; Jersey City, New Jersey, U.S.
- Died: September 4, 2015 (aged 81); Virginia Beach, Virginia, U.S.
- Occupation: Writer
- Spouses: Molly Cochran (divorced); Dawn Walters (divorced)
- Writing career
- Years active: 1971–2015
- Notable work: The Destroyer
- Website: warrenmurphy.com

Warren Burton Murphy (September 13, 1933 – September 4, 2015) was an American author, best known as the co-creator of The Destroyer series, the basis for the film Remo Williams: The Adventure Begins.

== Early life ==
Murphy was born in Jersey City, New Jersey, on September 13, 1933. He worked in journalism and politics until launching the Destroyer series with Richard Sapir in 1971. A screenwriter (Lethal Weapon 2, The Eiger Sanction) as well as a novelist, his work won a dozen national awards, including multiple Edgars and Shamuses. He lectured at many colleges and universities.

== Writing ==
Murphy was one of the authors of the screenplay for The Eiger Sanction in 1975, and also co-wrote (with series creator Shane Black) the original story for Lethal Weapon 2. He is the author of the Trace and Digger series. With Molly Cochran, he completed two books of a planned trilogy revolving around the character "The Grandmaster": The Grandmaster (1984) and High Priest (1989). Murphy also shared writing credits with Cochran on The Forever King and several novels under the name Dev Stryker. Some of his solo novels include Jericho Day, The Red Moon, The Ceiling of Hell, The Sure Thing and Honor Among Thieves. Over his career, Murphy has sold over 60 million books.

In 2002, Murphy started his own publishing house, Ballybunion, as a vehicle to start The Destroyer spin-off books. Ballybunion reprinted The Assassin's Handbook, as well as the original works Assassin's Handbook 2, The Movie That Never Was (a screenplay he and Richard Sapir wrote for a Destroyer movie that was never optioned), The Way of the Assassin (the wisdom of Chiun), and New Blood, a collection of short stories written by fans of the series. Together with Gerald Welch, he created a Destroyer spin-off series called Legacy, about Remo's children Winston "Stone" Smith and Freya Williams. After Murphy's death, Welch has continued writing new books in the series alone.

He served on the board of the Mystery Writers of America, and maintained membership with the Private Eye Writers of America, the International Association of Crime Writers, the American Crime Writers League and the Screenwriters Guild. In April 2007, Warren returned to co-authoring The Destroyer, which is now published by Tor Books. His final novel, Bloodline, was released by Tor in 2015.

== Awards and acclaim ==
Murphy received a number of awards and nominations for his work. Ceiling of Hell won the 1985 Shamus Award in the "Best Original Private Eye Paperback" category. His 1999 short story, "Another Day, Another Dollar", won the "Best Short Story" Shamus award. His novel Grandmaster won the 1985 Edgar Award for "Best Paperback Original Mystery Novel".

His novel Trace: Too Old a Cat was nominated for "Best Paperback Original" at the 1987 Anthony Awards and the Shamus Awards of the same year. Also Smoked Out was nominated in this category in 1983, Trace in 1984 (along with a 1983 Edgar Award nomination), Trace and 47 Miles of Rope in 1985, Trace: Pigs Get Fat in 1986 (along with a 1986 Edgar Award nomination); and Trace: Too Old a Cat in 1987.

== Personal life ==
A Korean War veteran, Murphy's hobbies included golf, mathematics, opera, and investing. Murphy was previously married to Molly Cochran and Dawn Walters, both marriages ended in divorce.

== Death ==
Murphy died on September 4, 2015, in Virginia Beach, Virginia, at the age of 81, of heart failure resulting from lung disease.
