= The Forever King =

1992 novel by Warren Murphy

- Cover Art of The Forever King
- Author: Molly Cochran and Warren Murphy
- Illustrator: Mel Green
- Cover artist: Joe DeVito, jacket design by Joe Curcio
- Language: English
- Genre: Fantasy
- Published: June 1992 Tor Books
- Media type: Print (hardback and paperback)
- Pages: 402
- ISBN: 0-312-85227-4

The Forever King is a fantasy book written by Molly Cochran and Warren Murphy, the authors of Grandmaster, which reached #3 on The New York Times bestseller list. The Forever King is the first in the Forever King Trilogy. The second title is The Broken Sword: King Arthur Returns while the third book is called The Third Magic. Robert Jordan, author of The Wheel of Time calls The Forever King "a fresh and exciting view of the Arthur legend.”

Set in modern and medieval times, the antagonist Saladin has lived through many of the world's ages by using the Holy Grail, until he loses it. The Cup finds its way into the hands of ten-year-old Arthur Blessing. Now Hal Woczniak must protect Arthur and the Grail from the madman Saladin, who kills anyone that ever stands in his way or between him and the Cup. The Forever King is 55 chapters divided into three sections titled, “Book One: The Boy,” “Book Two: The Cup,” and “Book Three: The King.”
