= The Legend of King Arthur =

- Written by: Andrew Davies
- Directed by: Rodney Bennett
- Starring: Andrew Burt; Felicity Dean; Maureen O'Brien; David Robb
- Theme music composer: Dudley Simpson
- Country of origin: United Kingdom
- No. of series: 1
- No. of episodes: 8

Production
- Producer: Ken Riddington
- Running time: 30 minutes

Original release
- Network: BBC1
- Release: 7 October – 25 November 1979

The Legend of King Arthur is a British television fantasy serial, produced by the BBC in association with Time-Life Television and the Australian Broadcasting Commission, and broadcast on BBC 1 in 1979.

== Plot ==
The story opens at King Uther's court, where he lusts after Igraine, wife of Gorlois, Duke of Cornwall..

== Cast ==
- Andrew Burt as King Arthur
- Felicity Dean as Guinevere
- Maureen O'Brien as Morgan le Fay
- David Robb as Lancelot
- Geoffrey Bateman as Gawain
- James Simmons as Galahad
- Robert Eddison as Merlin
- Patsy Kensit as the young Morgan
- Steve Hodson as Mordred

== Production ==
Earnestly historicist, the production design of the show was of the heroic age, ca. A.D. 500, like the HTV production Arthur of the Britons (1972–3). However, the tragic storyline of this BBC version kept closer faith with the chivalric romance of Le Morte d'Arthur.

== Reception ==
The Arthurian scholar Norris J. Lacy opines: "The Legend of King Arthur has the leisure to depict the legend in detail, but the resulting periodic presentation, if not the medium itself, dilutes the force and drama of the Arthurian story in a way that rarely happens in literature, and certainly not either in the French Vulgate or in Malory."

== Novelisation ==
A tie-in novel, The Legend of King Arthur, authored by the screenwriter Andrew Davies, was published in London by Fontana/Armada in 1979.

== Home video and DVD releases ==
The serial was released on VHS by BBC Video in 1985, and on DVD by Simply Media in 2016.

== See also ==
- List of films based on Arthurian legend
