= Pendragon's Banner =

Book trilogy by Helen Hollick

Pendragon's Banner is an historical fantasy trilogy by the British author Helen Hollick, published by William Heinemann in 1994, and later by Sourcebooks Inc in 2009 and by SilverWood Books in 2011. The three books are a re-telling of the King Arthur legend. They look to show Arthur Pendragon as he might have really been - no magic, fantasy or medieval legend. This is the basic, post-Roman view of Arthur as a battle-hardened warlord.

== Novels ==
=== The Kingmaking ===
The semi-historical novel follows the rise of the young Arthur Pendragon after the death of his father, Uther. The book concentrates on Arthur's relationship with Gwenhwyfar and his emerging prowess on the battlefield. The Kingmaking is set in Great Britain during the late fifth century some sixty years after the Roman legions pulled out of the island. By putting King Arthur into a realistic historical setting, some characters from Arthurian legend such as Merlin and Lancelot are left out.

== Reception ==
The trilogy garnered a number of positive reviews and endorsements. Best-selling historical fiction author Sharon Penman characterized the first volume as "a wonderful book...breathes new life into an ancient legend." According to Publishers Weekly, "Hollick's interpretation is bold, affecting and well worth fighting to defend." Books Magazine called The Kingmaking: "Uniquely compelling" and "bound to have a resounding and lasting impact on Arthurian fiction."

A reviewer in Pendragon Magazine wrote of one of the books: "Helen Hollick joins the ranks of Rosemary Sutcliff, Mary Stewart and Marion Bradley with this splendid novel," and Historical Novels Review enthused that one of her books "weaves together fact, legend and inspired imagination to create a world so real we can breathe the smoke of its fires and revel into Romano-British lust for life, love and honour."
