= Grail Prince =

2003 novel by Nancy McKenzie

- First edition cover
- Author: Nancy McKenzie
- Language: English
- Genre: Arthurian literature
- Published: 2003 Random House
- Publication place: United States
- Media type: Print (Paperback)
- Pages: 576 pp
- ISBN: 0-345-45648-3
- OCLC: 51337308
- LC Class: PS3613.C557 G73 2003
- Preceded by: Queen of Camelot

Grail Prince, a 2003 novel by American author Nancy McKenzie written in the tradition of Arthurian legends, recounts a version of Galahad's quest for the Holy Grail. The novel is a sequel to McKenzie's Queen of Camelot (2002).

== Plot summary ==
Before his death, King Arthur sends young Galahad, the oldest son of Lancelot and Elaine, on a quest to find the lost treasures of an ancient king — a Grail, a Spear, a Sword — which will safeguard Britain's future. For Galahad, the search becomes a transformative journey into manhood. His quest challenges his famed gallantry and purity, the traits that set him apart in the Arthurian legend as the only knight fit for and worthy of the quest for the Holy Grail.

== Critical reception ==
Publishers Weeklys' review was positive, writing that "familiarity with the Arthurian legends isn't necessary to enjoy this engrossing medieval fantasy." The Romantic Times stated that the novel was "a highly original interpretation of the character of Galahad. At times his overly sanctimonious attitude creates heartrending scenes, but Ms. McKenzie showcases the human frailties of love and honor as the boy becomes a man."

The novel was preceded by Queen of Camelot (2002) and succeeded by Prince of Dreams (2004).
