= Child of the Northern Spring =

1987 book by Persia Woolley

- First edition
- Author: Persia Woolley
- Language: English
- Series: Guinevere trilogy
- Genre: Historical
- Publisher: Poseidon Press
- Publication date: 1987
- Publication place: United States
- ISBN: 978-0-671-62199-5
- OCLC: 427426308
- Followed by: Queen of the Summer Stars

Child of the Northern Spring is the first novel in Persia Woolley's Guinevere trilogy, about the Arthurian legend. The novel is written in first person perspective narrated by Guinevere in the form of a frame narrative.

== Plot summary ==
The novel begins on the night before Guinevere's departure from her home, the kingdom of Rheged to Logres, in order to marry King Arthur. Along the journey, Guinevere recalls scenes from her childhood. Later, Bedivere retells the story of Arthur's ascension as High King, focusing on the events that surround Arthur meeting his father Uther, his investiture of Excalibur by Vivien the Lady of the Lake (and her subsequent death at the hands of Sir Balin) and the subsequent war with King Lot of Lothian. Afterwards, Guinevere retells how the war with Lot affected Guinevere's people directly. The book continues to show episodes of her youth and several proposed offers of marriage, including those of Gawain, Uwain, her cousin Maelgwn (who was willing to put aside his own wife in order to marry her), Gildas, and King Mark of Cornwall (made on his behalf by his nephew Tristan).

Arthur and Guinevere's marriage is a hasty affair, due to an invasion that was timed to coincide with the wedding celebrations, an act attempt at catching Arthur unaware. During this time Guinevere is left with Igraine and Morgan le Fey; the latter leaves when Guinevere discovers her and her paramour Accolon. Following Arthur's return there is the first meeting of the Round Table, which is a suggestion of Guinevere's.

== Characters ==
- Guinevere
- Leodegrance
- King Arthur
- Igraine
- Merlin
- Nimue
- Morgan le Fey
- Bedivere
- Griflet
- Gawain
- Gaheris
- Pellinore
- Lamorak
- Palomides
- Uther
- Lynette
- Tristran
- Accolon

== Adaptations of the Arthurian Legend ==
- Sir Balin and Sir Balan, while twins in the Arthurian legend, are two personalities in the same person. Balin/Balan destroys himself in the end, tearing his own flesh limb from limb.
- The Lady of the Lake is for the head of the druid order rather than a specific person. Vivien is the first lady of the lake and she is succeeded by Arthur's half sister Morgan le Fey after her death.
- Nimue is depicted as a "doire", a keeper of a sacred well, and initiates Guinevere with a blessing before her wedding. She was ostracised by Morgan le Fey, possibly through jealousy, due to her direct contact with the Triple Goddess.
- Morgan le Fey forges Excalibur after the death of her predecessor Viven. She places it in the stone where it is removed by Arthur at a ritual following the war with King Lot.
- The Round Table is not an actual table, rather it refers to the fact that the tables are arranged in a round. It is not only knights that sit there, but women of the court and later political leaders.
