= Guinevere trilogy =

The Guinevere trilogy is a trilogy of historical novels written by Persia Woolley about the Arthurian legend from the first-person perspective of King Arthur's wife, Guinevere.

#	Title	1st Edition	ISBN
1.	Child of the Northern Spring	1987	ISBN 978-0-671-62199-5
2.	Queen of the Summer Stars	1991	ISBN 978-0-671-62202-2
3.	Guinevere: The Legend in Autumn	1993	ISBN 978-0-671-70832-0
