= Laura Duke Condominas =

French actress (born 1951)

- Born: Laura Duke Mathews; April , 1951; Boston, Massachusetts, U.S.
- Other names: Laura Duke
- Occupations: Actress; Cultural designer
- Years active: 1974–present
- Known for: Role of Guinevere in Lancelot du lac (1974)
- Spouse: Laurent Condominas
- Children: Bloum Cárdenas
- Parent(s): Niki de Saint Phalle (mother); Harry Mathews (father)

Laura Duke Condominas (also known as Laura Duke), born in Boston in April 1951, is the daughter of French-American artist and film-maker Niki de Saint-Phalle and American novelist Harry Mathews. As an actress, she is most notable for her portrayal of Guinevere in Robert Bresson's film Lancelot du lac (1974).

She grew up in France in the artistic and film-making milieu of her mother, who was struggling with mental distress. Her parents separated by mutual agreement in 1960, and she and her brother Philip went to live with her father.

She married Laurent Condominas, a model and photographer linked to the "Zanzibar Films" collective of avant garde French film-makers, also known as the "Dandies of May 1968". The group were financed until 1970 by Sylvina Boissonnas, a French heiress with an interest in film production. Laurent appeared in Patrick Deval's film Acéphale (Headless) (1969) which followed a young man wandering through the aftermath of the 1968 Paris protests. A daughter, Bloum (now known as Bloum Cardenas), was born to the couple in 1971 in Bali, Indonesia.

Bresson had been planning a film of the grail legend for a long period. His original choice to play Guenièvre (Guinevere) 20 years previously had been Niki de Saint Phalle, Laura's mother, but the project had been delayed again and again. His final selection of Laura came about by chance when he came across a photograph of the daughter with no prior information about who she was or that she was in fact the direct descendant of his first choice. Lancelot du lac was filmed from the end of June to the start of September 1973 in Noirmoutier-en-l'Île in the Vendée, and first screened at Cannes in May 1974. Laura Duke later appeared in her mother's film Un rêve plus long que la nuit (1976) with Laurent, and a minor part in La Nuit porte-jarretelles (1985) a film by Virginie Thévenet.

In 2008–2009, Duke hosted several key production meetings for the full-dome panoramic film Maya Skies. During this time, she began to develop The Curved Blackboard, a STEAM arts immersion outreach program, intended to benefit at-risk youth in the San Francisco Bay Area.

During 2015–2017, The Curved Blackboard held its first two years of classes as part of the Berkeley Unified School District, under Duke's direction. The project was funded by the UC Berkeley Chancellor's Community Partnership Fund and the Berkeley Unified School District BALSA APEX program. The Curved Blackboard was included in the BALSA APEX showcase May 9, 2016.

In the 2017–2018 school year, The Curved Blackboard received funding from the BUSD Strategic Impact Grants for a series of after-school programs combining art, science and practical making.

Duke works as a cultural designer in Oakland, California.
