= Finding Merlin =

2007 book by Adam Ardrey

Finding Merlin: The Truth Behind the Legend
- Author: Adam Ardrey
- Publication date: 2007
- ISBN: 9781845962487

Finding Merlin: The Truth Behind The Legend is a 2007 book by Scottish advocate Adam Ardrey, in which he puts forward the theory that Merlin was a Scottish druid, politician and scholar. The book claims that Merlin was born in 540 CE in Cadzow (Hamilton), and died circa 618 in Drumelzier, near Dunipace. The book also states that one of Merlin's main antagonists was Saint Mungo.
