= Queen of Camelot =

2002 novel by Nancy McKenzie

- First edition cover
- Author: Nancy McKenzie
- Language: English
- Genre: Arthurian Legends
- Publisher: Random House Publishing Group
- Publication date: 2002
- Publication place: United States
- Media type: Print Paperback)
- Pages: 640 pp
- ISBN: 0-345-44587-2
- OCLC: 48760163
- Followed by: Grail Prince

Queen of Camelot is an Arthurian-legend based novel shown through the viewpoint of Queen Guinevere. It is a combination of two of Nancy McKenzie's previous books The Child Queen and The High Queen. She states in the foreword that she originally intended the novels to be combined, but they were split at the time of publication because of their length.

== Plot summary ==
The novel begins at the end of the story. The prologue leads you to know how Guinevere came to write the story of her and Arthur, and the Knights. Guinevere is in a convent when Lancelot comes to her telling her of Arthur's death and deterioration of Britain. Lancelot tells her that he had a vision of Merlin telling him to go to her and ask her to write down the story of her life, and the life of Arthur. He says that it isn't meant for the people of today, but a future generation of Britons.

The novel then opens with Guinevere's birth, and a prophecy that was told to her father the night she was born. Guinevere is to be a "white shadow" or gwenhwyfar. Guinevere spends her early years being adored and pampered by her father, a minor king in northern Britain. As he ages, he sends her away to her mother's sister and her husband, who is king of a nearby land. Her aunt has one daughter near her age; Elaine. Elaine and Guinevere grow up together as best friends. Elaine is headstrong, stubborn, and always puts herself first, even before her older cousin. Elaine also adores the legend of Arthur, and then when Arthur takes his place at the throne of Britain, uniting the country and fighting the Saxons, Elaine becomes obsessed with him, believing herself to be his future bride, and meant for his unending love.

When Arthur is chosen a bride, it is Guinevere, which complicates her relationship with Elaine, igniting fierce jealousy in the heart of Elaine. Lancelot is sent to retrieve Guinevere for Arthur and take her to "Camelot" for him. At their first meeting they fall passionately and helplessly in love. Though, here, Guinevere's affair with Lancelot is celibate, although no less passionate, and at times much more realistic than other versions of the story. When Lancelot tells Arthur about his bride, Guinevere, Arthur realizes Lancelot's love for her, but due to their great friendship, and his own love and trust in Guinevere, Arthur finds a way to accept it and move on.

Years later, Elaine schemes to make Lancelot her husband, as revenge to Guinevere for taking Arthur from her. Though Lancelot does not love Elaine, he takes her for a bride and together they leave Camelot for his family's lands in Gaul, to start a family.

As time passes, it becomes clear Guinevere cannot become pregnant. In need of an heir, she and Arthur decide to recognize his bastard son Mordred, whom he had with his sister Morguase. They bring Mordred and his half-brothers to Camelot, to train to become Knights. Guinevere takes a special liking to Mordred, who dreams of a unified Britain. His dreams are the undoing of Arthur. Mordred meets with Saxon leaders in secret to make a peace treaty, as Arthur goes to fight the Saxons. Seeing his son betray him, and stay on the Saxon side leads him to failure and his own death, by Mordred's hand. These are the events that have just taken place when we find Guinevere in the convent during the prologue.

== Publication and critical reaction ==
The Child Queen and The High Queen were published in 1994 and 1995, respectively. They were revised and combined into one volume, Queen of Camelot, in 2002.

Publishers Weekly gave The Child Queen a mostly positive review, noting that McKenzie "brings immediate freshness to her entertaining reworking of an often-told story." While calling it a "worthwhile debut," the reviewer thought it suffered from Guinevere's rivalry with Elaine, which reduces the former to acting like "nothing so much as a spoiled brat." In a review of The High Queen, Melinda Helfer of the Romantic Times stated that "McKenzie relates [the story] with the power and enchantment of a true bard, bringing legend to compelling and unforgettable life." Michael Ashley, author of The Mammoth Book of King Arthur, opined that the characters were "well drawn if somewhat idealized," and felt that The High Queen was superior to The Child Queen.

Two novels followed Queen of Camelot: Grail Prince, which features Galahad, and Prince of Dreams, a version of the Tristan and Isolde legend.
