= Helen Hollick =

British author of historical fiction (born 1953)

Helen Hollick (born 1953) is a British author of historical fiction. She is the author of the Arthurian trilogy Pendragon's Banner, and the novels Harold the King and A Hollow Crown.

== Life and career ==
Born in Walthamstow, Hollick worked as a library assistant at a Chingford library for 13 years, during which time she developed a passion for Dark Age history and King Arthur. She wrote her Arthurian trilogy, which was accepted for publication by Heinemann three days after her 40th birthday in 1993.

Previously she had published a children's personal safety book, Come and Tell Me, a story she had written for her daughter when she was 3. "I wanted to tell her how to keep safe in a clear and simple manner — with a message that could be easily remembered," Hollick wrote on her web site. "'Always come and tell me before you go anywhere with anyone' fitted nicely." Her story became an official safety book of the British Home Office for use nationwide by police and schools. An updated and revised version of the book has been published by Happy Cat Books. but is now out of print.

Until 2013 Hollick lived in Walthamstow with her husband, Ron, who is retired, and an adult daughter. Early in January 2013 the family moved to North Devon, taking the opportunity to leave London for a quieter rural lifestyle.

In a review of King Harold, Cliff Moore wrote in the Dorset Evening Echo, "What is most inspiring about Hollick is that she can produce such a mammoth book from a household where she is the only reader — her daughter suffers from severe dyslexia."

== Published novels ==
=== The Sea Witch Series ===
Pirate-based historical fantasy novels for adults (published by SilverWood Books 2011) swashbuckling adventure that you'll love to pieces of eight!

- Sea Witch Being the first voyage of Captain Jesamiah Acorne (2006) (new edition 2011)
- Pirate Code The second voyage of Captain Jesamiah Acorne (2007) (new edition 2011)
- Bring It Close The third voyage of Captain Jesamiah Acorne (2009) (new edition 2011)
- Ripples In The Sand The fourth voyage of Captain Jesamiah Acorne (2012)
- "On The Account" The fifth Voyage of Captain Jesamiah Acorne (2016)

=== The Saxon Series ===
(The Lost Kingdom - 1066 Series in the United States)

- Harold the King (published by SilverWood Books 2011) (US - I Am the Chosen King)
- A Hollow Crown (US - The Forever Queen): The Story of Emma, Queen of Saxon England (William Heinemann/Arrow Books 2004)

=== Other published work ===
- Come and Tell Me Be Sensible and Safe (published by Happy Cat Books 2002)Out of Print
