= J. S. Lewis =

American novelist

- Born: Jon Samuel Lewis; May 15, 1972 (age 54)
- Education: Arizona State University
- Occupation: Writer
- Writing career
- Genres: Science fiction, action, adventure fiction

Jon Samuel Lewis (born May 15, 1972) is an American fiction writer under the pen name J. S. Lewis. He is co-author of the popular Grey Griffins series, originally published by Scholastic, Inc. The next three books in the Grey Griffins series will be published as the Grey Griffins Clockwork Chronicles by Little, Brown Books for Young Readers. The original trilogy has sold over 850,000 copies to date.

== Background ==
Lewis grew up in the Midwestern United States, spending most of his time in Minnesota and Iowa before moving to Arizona where he attended Arizona State University, earning a degree in Broadcast Journalism.

At an early age, Lewis set out to become a comic book illustrator, but he discovered a love for writing when he first began crafting the background stories for the comic book characters he had drawn.

Lewis began his first novel at the age of fourteen with writing partner Derek Benz. Intended to be an epic fantasy in the tradition of Tolkien, Lewis and Benz never finished the manuscript.

The authors reunited in Arizona in 2000, however, where they began writing their Grey Griffins series.

== Published books ==
- Grey Griffins series by Derek Benz and Lewis
1. The Revenge of the Shadow King (Orchard Books, March 2006)
2. The Rise of the Black Wolf (January 2007)
3. The Fall of the Templar (January 2008)
4. Clockwork Chronicles: The Brimstone Key (Little, Brown, June 2010)
5. Clockwork Chronicles: The Relic Hunters (May 2011)
6. Clockwork Chronicles: The Paragon Prison (May 2012)
- C.H.A.O.S.
1. Invasion (Thomas Nelson, January 2011)
2. Alienation (January 2012)
3. Domination (April 2013)
