= Nancy McKenzie =

American author of historical fiction (born 1948)

- Born: February 19, 1948 (age 78)
- Education: Bachelor of Arts
- Alma mater: Mount Holyoke College
- Occupation: Author
- Writing career
- Language: English
- Genre: Historical fiction
- Notable work: Queen of Camelot

Nancy Affleck McKenzie (born February 19, 1948) is an American author of historical fiction. Her primary focus is Arthurian legend.

== Publishing career ==
McKenzie published The Child Queen in 1994, and its sequel, The High Queen, a year later. The Child Queen won "Discovery of the Year" from Del Rey Books in 1993, and the Washington Irving Medal from Westchester Library Association, NY the following year. The two novels were combined into Queen of Camelot in 2002. McKenzie wanted to rediscover Guinevere in her true fifth century environment. "I decided to write about Guinevere because I never understood her. I wanted to make her into someone a 20th-century person could understand," McKenzie said in an interview.

Two sequels followed, Grail Prince and Prince of Dreams, following by two young adult novels, Guinevere's Gift and Guinevere's Gamble. Prince of Dreams tells the story of Tristan and Iseult, and takes place after King Arthur's death. One reviewer wrote of the novel, McKenzie "explores the vulnerability of women in a violent and patriarchal society".

McKenzie recently stated "Thus far, my published books are all Arthurian adventures/ romances, but I am deeply interested in ancient Egyptian culture and hope to write an archaeologically up-to-date life of Akhenaten in the near future".

== List of works ==
- The Child Queen (1994)
- The High Queen (1995), combined with The Child Queen and republished as Queen of Camelot in 2002.
- Grail Prince (2003)
- Prince of Dreams (2004)
- The Chrysalis Queen Quartet series:

- Guinevere's Gift (2008)
- Guinevere's Gamble (2009)

== Personal life ==
McKenzie was born in Princeton, New Jersey to James G. and Callie K Affleck. She graduated from Mount Holyoke College in 1970, and achieved her Master's degree from Tufts University in 1973. She married Bruce Gordon McKenzie in 1972, and they have three daughters. McKenzie resides in Danbury, Connecticut. In between her novels, McKenzie ran a freelance desktop publishing business from 1989 to 2000.

She has listed Mary Stewart as one of her favorite authors, along with George Eliot and P. D. James.
