= Guinevere: The Legend in Autumn =

1993 novel by Persia Woolley

- First edition
- Author: Persia Woolley
- Series: Guinevere trilogy
- Genre: Historical novel
- Publisher: Poseidon Press
- Publication date: 1993
- Publication place: United States
- ISBN: 978-0-671-70832-0
- OCLC: 27294652
- Preceded by: Queen of the Summer Stars

Guinevere: The Legend of Autumn is a 1993 novel by Persia Woolley. It is the third book of the Guinevere trilogy. The novel relates the events of the Arthurian legend in first-person perspective from the point of view of Guinevere, the wife of King Arthur. Beginning with Guinevere reflecting while imprisoned before being burnt at the stake for her affair with Lancelot, Guinevere retells the quest of the Holy Grail, the coming of Perceval and Gareth to the court and Mordred's rebellion with his brothers Agravain and Gaheris. The novel finishes with Arthur's war with Lancelot over Guinevere and the war between Arthur and his son Mordred ending in the death of Arthur and the end of an age.
