= Derek Benz =

American novelist

- Born: October 27, 1971 (age 54)
- Occupation: Writer
- Writing career
- Period: 2006–present
- Genres: Science fiction, action, adventure fiction

Derek Benz (born October 27, 1971) is an American writer of fantasy fiction for children, co-author with J. S. Lewis of the Grey Griffins series, originally published by Scholastic, Inc.

As of 2026, Benz lives with his wife and son in New Jersey.

== Published books ==
=== Grey Griffins series by Benz and J.S. Lewis ===
1. The Revenge of the Shadow King (Orchard Books, 2006)
2. The Rise of the Black Wolf (Orchard, 2007)
3. The Fall of the Templar (2008)
4. Clockwork Chronicles: The Brimstone Key (Little, Brown, 2010)
5. Clockwork Chronicles: The Relic Hunters (2011)
6. Clockwork Chronicles: The Paragon Prison (2012)
7. A Grey Griffin Companion (2013)
8. Grey Griffins: Operation Sheba (2014)
