= Persia Woolley =

American novelist

- Born: November 8, 1935; California, U.S.
- Died: October 3, 2017 (aged 81); Sebastopol, California, U.S.
- Occupation: Author
- Writing career
- Genres: Historical fiction, Fantasy
- Website: persiawoolley.wordpress.com

Persia Woolley (November 8, 1935 – October 3, 2017) was an American author, perhaps best known for her Guinevere trilogy. She also wrote a number of works on writing, such as How to Write and Sell Historical Fiction (2000).

== Works ==
In the historical fiction genre, Woolley wrote the Guinevere trilogy, about King Arthur's wife, Guinevere. This trilogy comprises Child of the Northern Spring (1987), Queen of the Summer Stars (1990) and Guinevere: The Legend in Autumn (1993).

Her non-fiction work includes two books on divorce, Creative Survival for Single Mothers (1974) and The Custody Handbook (1979).

== Personal life ==
Woolley grew up in Auburn, California as the only child of Lois and William Higman. She studied architecture at University of California, Berkeley, and married James P. Woolley, an engineer, in 1956. They had two children before divorcing in 1958; Woolley's experience as a single mother led her to write her first two books, Creative Survival for Single Mothers (1974) and The Custody Handbook (1979). She married Dr. Edwjard Garwin in 1978.

Persia Woolley died October 3, 2017, in Sebastopol, CA, USA, at the age of eighty one.
