= Grey Griffins =

Children's novel series

- The logo of the Grey Griffins book series.
- The Revenge of the Shadow King; The Rise of the Black Wolf; The Fall of the Templar; The Brimstone Key; The Relic Hunters; The Paragon Prison
- Author: Derek Benz and J. S. Lewis
- Illustrator: August Hall
- Cover artist: Richard Amari
- Country: United States and Canada
- Language: English
- Genre: Children's literature, science fiction, fantasy
- Publisher: Orchard Books (an imprint of Scholastic Inc); Little, Brown Books for Young Readers
- Published: March 2006 – May 2012
- Website: grey-griffins.com

Grey Griffins is a children's novel series written by the American authors Derek Benz and J. S. Lewis in collaboration.

The first trilogy in the series was published by Orchard Books, an imprint of Scholastic Inc. The authors signed with Little, Brown Books for Young Readers for the second trilogy.

== Plot ==
The Grey Griffins series follows the story of four close friends (Max, Ernie, Natalia and Harley) who find the small town they have lived in all their lives is ground zero for an invasion of the darkest and most dangerous sort of magic.

== List of novels ==
=== Main Trilogy ===
- The Revenge of the Shadow King (March 2006)
- The Rise of the Black Wolf (January 2007)
- The Fall of the Templar (January 2008)

=== Clockwork Chronicles ===
- The Brimstone Key (June 7, 2010)
- The Relic Hunters (May 10, 2011)
- The Paragon Prison (May 8, 2012)

== List of major characters ==
- Grayson Maximillian Sumner III / Max Sumner: Leader of the Secret Order of the Grey Griffins.
- Ernie Tweeny: Youngest of the Grey Griffins; AKA: Agent Thunderbolt.
- Natalia Romanov: Detective of the Grey Griffins.
- Harley Davidson Eisenstein: Engineer and tough guy of the Grey Griffins.
