= Queen of the Summer Stars =

1990 novel by Persia Woolley

- First edition
- Author: Persia Woolley
- Series: Guinevere trilogy
- Genre: Historical novel
- Published: 1990 Simon and Schuster
- Publication place: United States
- Media type: Print (Paperback)
- ISBN: 978-0-671-62202-2
- OCLC: 24434678
- Preceded by: Child of the Northern Spring
- Followed by: Guinevere: The Legend in Autumn

Queen of the Summer Stars is a 1991 novel by Persia Woolley and is the second volume of the Guinevere trilogy that relate the Arthurian legend from the perspective of Guinevere. The novel introduces Lancelot and also outlines King Arthur's victory at the Battle of Badon Hill as well as his betrayal by his half-sister Morgan la Fay, the death of Merlin and the death of Morgause by her son Agravain. Guinevere takes in and raises Mordred after he is revealed to Guinevere as King Arthur and Morgause's son.
