= Sherrell =

Sherrell is the name of:

- Carl Sherrell (1929–1990), American artist, illustrator, and author
- Sweet Charles Sherrell (1943–2023), American bassist
- Horace Sherrell (1886–1940), American college football and coach
- Sherell Ford (born 1972), American basketballer
