= Lady of the Lake =

Sorceress in Arthurian legend

Lady of the Lake (Viviane / Nimue)
- Matter of Britain character
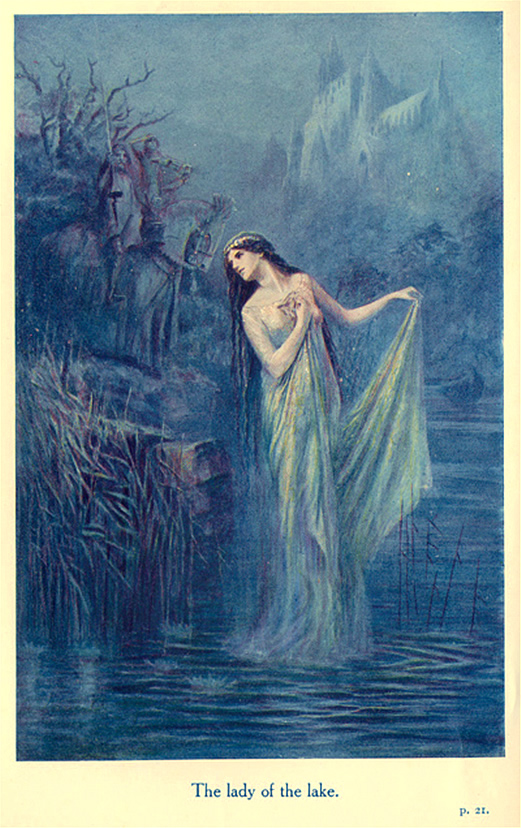
- The Lady of the Lake in Lancelot Speed's illustration for James Thomas Knowles' The Legends of King Arthur and His Knights (1912)
- First appearance: Vulgate Cycle
- Created by: Anonymous French author(s)
- Based on: Disputed origins (including possible Morgan connections); earlier and unnamed versions of the character in Lanzelet and Lancelot

In-universe information
- Species: Fairy or human
- Title: Lady of the Lake
- Occupation: Enchantress
- Family: Dyonas (father), Lunete (cousin)
- Spouse: Pelleas
- Significant others: Merlin, sometimes others
- Children: Lancelot (adopted)
- Home: Lake, Brocéliande, Avalon

The Lady of the Lake (French: Dame du Lac, Demoiselle du Lac) is a title used by multiple characters in the Matter of Britain, the body of medieval literature and mythology associated with the legend of King Arthur. As either actually fairy or fairy-like yet human enchantresses, they play important roles in various stories, notably by providing Arthur with the sword Excalibur, eliminating the wizard Merlin, raising the knight Lancelot after the death of his father, and helping to take the dying Arthur to Avalon after his final battle.

Different Ladies of the Lake appear concurrently as separate characters in some versions of the legend since at least the Post-Vulgate Cycle and consequently the seminal Le Morte d'Arthur, with the latter describing them as members of a hierarchical group, while some texts also give this title to either Morgan or her sister. As either single character or multiple ones, the figure of the Lady of the Lake often appears in various roles in the works of modern culture.

== Names and origins ==
Today, the Lady of the Lake is best known as the character called either Nimue, or several scribal variants of Ninianne and Viviane. French and foreign medieval authors and copyists since the early 13th century produced various forms of the latter two. Such forms include Nymenche (in addition to Ninianne / Ninienne) in the Vulgate Lancelot; Nim[i]ane and Ui[n/ui]ane (in addition to Viviane) in the Vulgate Merlin (Niniane in the version Livre d'Artus); Nin[i]eve / Nivene / Niviène / Nivienne and Vivienne in the Post-Vulgate Merlin (Niviana in the Spanish Baladro del Sage Merlin); and Nimiane / Niniame and Vivian / Vivien in Arthour and Merlin and Henry Lovelich's Merlin. Further variations of these include alternate spellings with the letter i written as y, such as in the cases of Nymanne (Nimanne as in Michel le Noir's Merlin) and Nynyane (Niniane). According to Lucy Paton, the most primitive French form of this name might have been Niniane. Danielle Quéruel of the Bibliothèque nationale de France explains:

Fairies are one of the most important elements of Arthurian fantasy. They are supernatural beings of Celtic origin, often fatal women, whose figures are an extension of the nymphs and goddesses of antiquity. Knights searching for adventures meet these women with strange powers in the dark and deep forests but also in the castles that stand on their roads. Beneficial or malicious, they often hide their nature under the guise of a virgin in distress in order to test the bravery and virtue of the knights.

Among these fairies, Viviane plays a prominent role. The Lady of the Lake, called Niniène or Niniane in medieval texts, embodies the traditional water fairy. It is she who spirits away the newborn Lancelot to keep him and raises him in her domain of the Lake, sheltered from the world. Once he is knighted, she will always keep an eye on her protégé, whom she will save several times from madness.

The much later form Nimue, in which the letter e can be written as ë or é, was invented and popularized by Thomas Malory through his 15th-century English Le Morte d'Arthur and itself has several variations: her name appears as Nymue, Nyneue, Nyneve and Nynyue in William Caxton's print edition, but it had been rather Nynyve (used predominantly) and Nenyve in the Winchester Manuscript. Even though 'Nymue' (with the m) appears only in the Caxton text, the modernized and standardized 'Nimue' is now the most common form of the name of Malory's character, as Caxton's edition was the only version of Le Morte d'Arthur published until 1947. Nimue is also sometimes rendered by modern authors and artists as either Nimuë or Nimüe (the forms introduced in the 19th century through Tennyson's poem "Enid and Nimuë: The True and the False" and Burne-Jones' painting Merlin and Nimüe.)

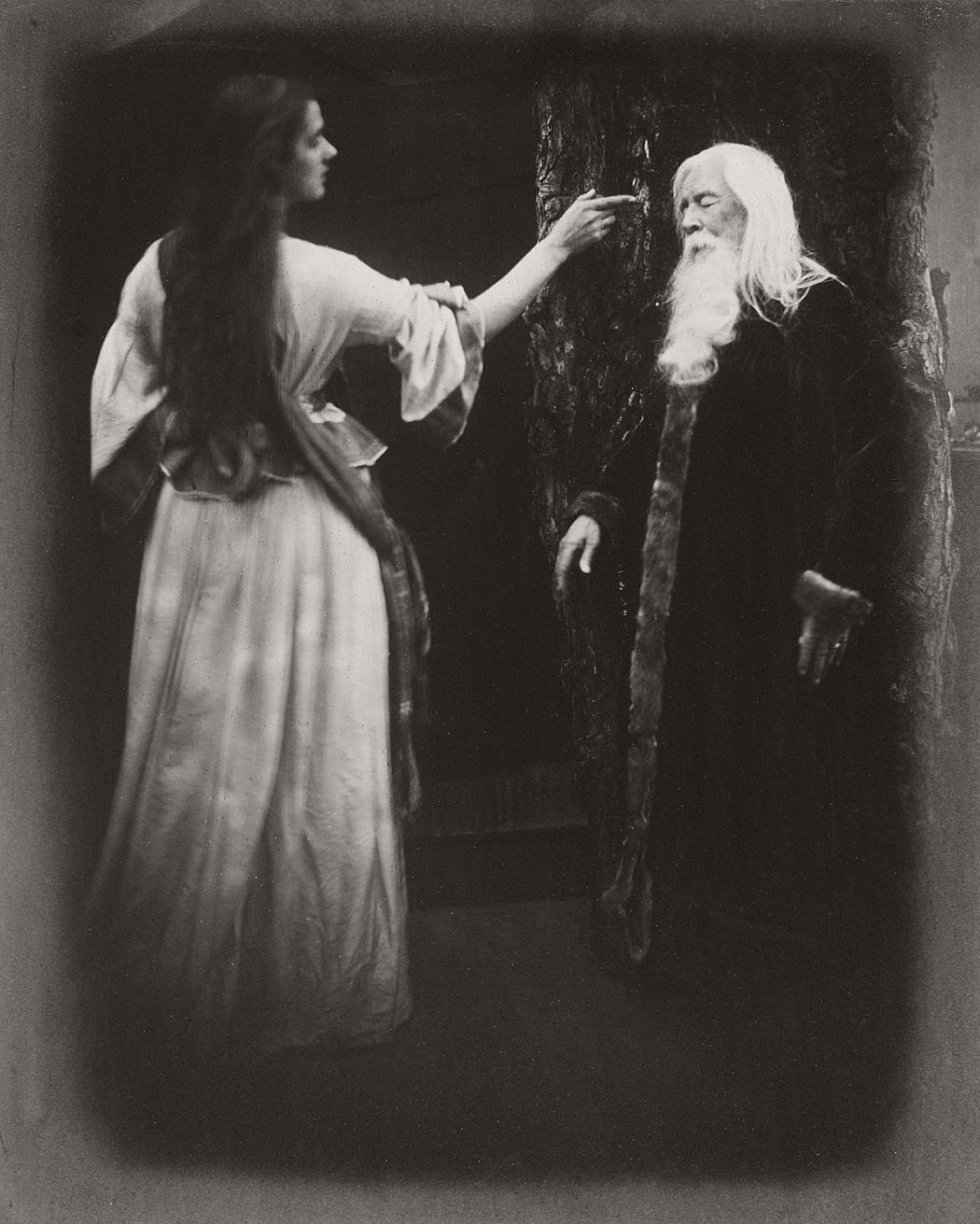
Vivien and Merlin (1874) by Julia Margaret Cameron

Arthurian scholar A. O. H. Jarman, following suggestions first made in the 19th century, proposed that the name Viviane used in French Arthurian romances, was ultimately derived from (and a corruption of) the Welsh word chwyfleian (also spelled hwimleian and chwibleian in medieval Welsh sources), meaning "a wanderer of pallid countenance", which was originally applied as an epithet to the famous prototype of Merlin, a prophetic wild man figure Myrddin Wyllt in medieval Welsh poetry. Due to the relative obscurity of the word, it was misunderstood as "fair wanton maiden" and taken to be the name of Myrddin's female captor. Others have linked the name Nymenche with the Irish mythology's figure Niamh (an otherworldly woman from the legend of Tír na nÓg), and the name Niniane with the Welsh mythology's figure Rhiannon (another otherworldly woman of a Celtic myth), or, as a feminine form of the masculine name Ninian, with the likes of the 5th-century (male) saint Ninian and the river Ninian.

Further theories connect her to the Welsh lake fairies known as the Gwragedd Annwn (including a Lady of the Lake unrelated to the legend of Arthur), the Celtic water goddess Covianna (worshipped in the Romano-British times as Coventina), and the Irish goddess of the underworld Bé Finn (Bébinn, mother of the hero Fráech). It has been also noted how the North Caucasian goddess Satana (Satanaya) from the Nart sagas is both associated with water and helps the Scythian hero Batraz gain his magic sword. Possible literary prototypes include two characters from Geoffrey of Monmouth's Vita Merlini: Merlin's one-time wife Guendoloena and Merlin's half-sister Ganieda. Another possibility involves Diana, the Roman goddess of hunt and nature, a direct or spiritual descent from whom is actually explicitly attributed to Viviane within some French prose narratives, in which she is arguably even serving as Diana's avatar. It has also been speculated that the name Viviane may be a derivative form of Diana (French Diane).

The mythical Greek sea nymph Thetis, mother of the hero Achilles, similarly provides her son with magical weapons. Like the Lady of the Lake, Thetis is a water spirit who raises the greatest warrior of her time. Thetis' husband is named Peleus, while in some tales the Lady of the Lake has the knight Pelleas as her lover; Thetis also uses magic to make her son invulnerable, similar to how Lancelot receives a ring that protects him from evil magic. The Greek myth may therefore have inspired or influenced the Arthurian legend, especially since The Iliad involving Thetis was well known across the former Roman Empire and among the medieval writers dealing with Celtic myths and lore. The Roman fort Aballava, known to the post-Roman Britons as Avalana and today seen by some as the location of the historical Avalon, had been also curiously dedicated the Roman water goddess Dea Latis. Laurence Gardner interpreted the supposed (as attributed by medieval authors) Biblical origins of Lancelot's bloodline by noting the belief about Jesus' purported wife Mary Magdalene's later life in Gaul (today's France) and her death at Aquae Sextiae; he identified her descendant as the 6th-century Comtess of Avallon named Viviane del Acqs ("of the water"), whose three daughters (associated with the mothers of Lancelot, of Arthur, and of Gawain) would thus become known as the 'Ladies of the Lake'.

Chrétien de Troyes's French Lancelot, the Knight of the Cart, the first known story featuring Lancelot as a prominent character, was also the first to mention his upbringing by a fairy in a lake. If it is accepted that the Franco-German Lanzelet by Ulrich von Zatzikhoven contains elements of a more primitive version of this tale than Chrétien's, the infant Lancelot was spirited away to a lake by a water fairy (merfeine in Old High German) known as the Lady of the Sea and then raised in her Land of Maidens (Meide lant). The fairy queen character and her paradise island in Lanzelet are reminiscent of Morgen (Morgan) of the Island of Avallon in Geoffrey's work. Furthermore, the fairy from Lanzelet has a son whose name Mabuz is an Anglo-Norman form of Mabon, son of Morgan's early Welsh counterpart Modron. According to Roger Sherman Loomis, "it seems almost certain" that Morgan and the Lady of the Lake have originally began as one character in the legend. In a related hypothesis, the early Myrddyn tradition could have merged with the fairy lover motif popular in medieval stories, and such role would later split into Merlin's two fairy mistresses, one of them 'good' and the other 'bad'.

== Character evolution ==
Iconic motifs and their sources
Select element or episode	Earliest text
A fairy lady has raised and magically aids Lancelot.	Lancelot, the Knight of the Cart (c. 1177)
A water fairy queen abducts and raises the young Lancelot as a great knight.	Lanzelet (after 1194) (translation from an unknown earlier source)
Introducing the concept and name of the Lady of the Lake. After rescuing and raising Lancelot, she sends him to the court of King Arthur, and later aids him during his knight-errant adventures and in his romance with Guinevere.	Vulgate Lancelot (c. 1215)
The Lady of the Lake is retrospectively identified as the fairy Viviane (Niniane), introduced as a young teenage noble (with supernatural ancient origins) from Little Britain. She captures the wizard Merlin, using the very magic that he himself taught her out of his love for her, almost always unrequited.	Vulgate Merlin Continuation (before 1235)
Another Lady of the Lake gives the sword Excalibur to Arthur and is later killed by Balin. Viviane cruelly kills Merlin out of her hatred of him. Afterwards, she begins to aid Arthur and protects him from his wicked sister Morgan.	Post-Vulgate Merlin Continuation (after 1235)
Compiler Malory's redefinition of Viviane as Nimue (Nynyve), the "chief Lady of the Lake", who marries Pelleas and in the end accompanies Morgan in taking Arthur to Avalon.	Le Morte d'Arthur (1485)
Modern author Tennyson splitting the evil Vivien back from Malory's Nimue while keeping the latter as a separate character, a development that influenced modern portrayals.	"Vivien" (1859) in Idylls of the King

According to Maureen Fries, "more beneficent splittings-off from [Morgan's] original role emerge in the several Ladies of the Lake who later develop from her archetype: literally watered-down from Morgan (whose name indicates her origins in the greater body of water, the sea)." She wrote about this "fluid figure, always at least double and usually multiple in her manifestations":

Obviously the Lady has been retailored to represent the (mostly) nurturing side of the split mother-image, as Morgan has become the (mostly) devouring side. A combination of these split images appears in the figure of Nimue (also called Niniane and Viviane), who first serves as a devourer and then as a restorer of Arthurian males. Like her [Excalibur giver] sister-avatar, she is called the Lady of the Lake. In a borrowing from Morgan's career, she has the besotted Merlin teach her his magic, but without yielding to him sexually. Shutting Merlin away in a cave, she deprives the male Arthurians of their counselor and reveals her own cunning ambition. But Nimue then becomes the devoted and influential friend of Arthurian society: she saves the King and his knights from Morgan's death-dealing [...] and emerges as one of the three (or more, depending on the work) queens who bear the King away to Avalon. This last function allies her, of course, with her original—Morgan le Fay.

== Legend ==
=== Lancelot's guardian ===
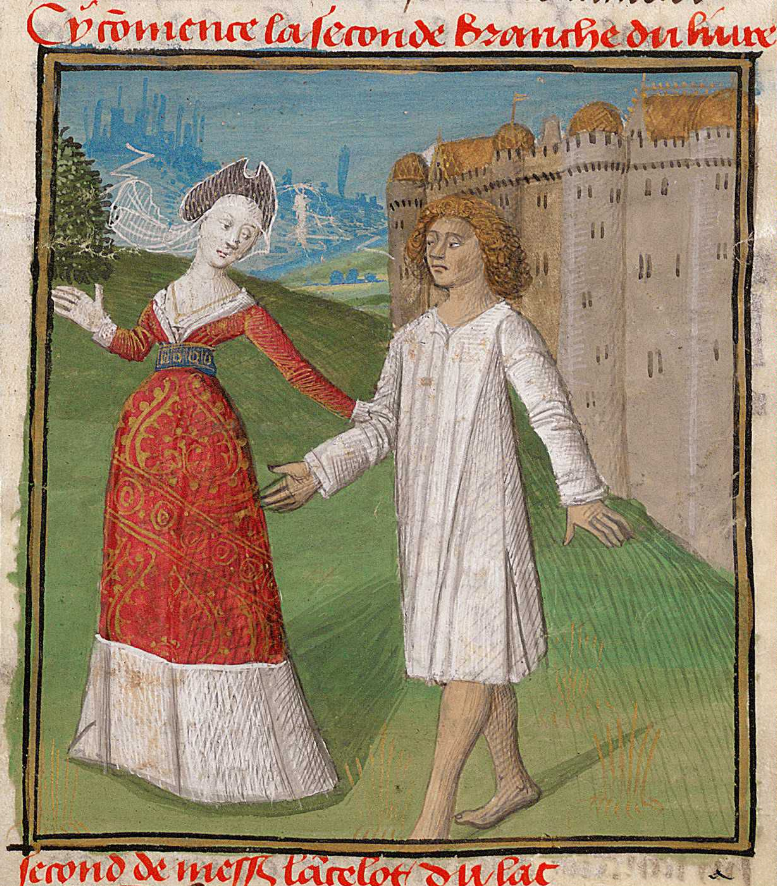
The Lady of the Lake finds Lancelot at Tintagel Castle to cure his madness, caused by Morgan the fairy sending him a dream vision of Guinevere's infidelity to him. Evrard d'Espinques' illumination of the Vulgate Lancelot (BNF fr. 114 f. 352, c. 1475)

Following her early appearances in the 12th-century poems of Chrétien and Ulrich, the Lady of the Lake began being featured by this title in the French chivalric romance prose by the 13th century. As a fairy godmother-type foster mother of the hero Lancelot, Chrétien's version resembles an unnamed aquatic (sea) fairy queen in Ulrich's Lanzelet, where she is known only as "the lady" or "the queen". Ulrich uses the changeling part of the fairy abduction lore for the background of Lancelot as having been swapped with her son Mabuz. However, the figure of Lancelot's supernatural foster mother has no offspring of her own in any of the later texts. She does not appear in person in Chrétien's Lancelot that only mentions her briefly, referred to as just the "lady" by Lancelot, as an unnamed fairy "who had cared for [Lancelot] in his infancy" and continues to aid him remotely through her magic ring worn by him. Chrétien does not explictly link her to any body of water, but he does name Lancelot himself as "of the Lake" (du Lac).

In the Lancelot-Grail (Vulgate) prose cycle, loosely based on Chrétien, the Lady of the Lake (Dame du Lac) resides in an otherworldly enchanted realm, the entry to which is disguised as an illusion of a lake (the Post-Vulgate explains it as a work of Merlin). There, she raises Lancelot du Lac from his infancy having stolen him from his mother following the death of his father, King Ban. She teaches Lancelot arts and writing, infusing him with wisdom and courage, and overseeing his martial training to become an unsurpassed knight. She also rears his orphaned cousins Lionel and Bors after having her sorcerous damsel Saraïde (later called Celise) rescue them from King Claudas. All this takes her only a few years in the human world. Afterwards, she sends off the adolescent Lancelot to King Arthur's court as the nameless White Knight, due to her own affinity with this color (wearing white is a common attribute of faery women in Arthurian legend and he is also given a white armour by her counterpart in Lanzelet).

Through much of the Prose Lancelot Propre, the Lady of the Lake keeps aiding Lancelot in various ways during his early adventures as a knight-errant to become a famed hero and discover his true identity, usually acting through her maidens serving as her agents and messengers. She gives or sends him her gifts, including a set of magical gear and a magic ring of protection against enchantments (a ring from her also grants Lancelot's secret lover, Queen Guinevere, an immunity from Morgan's power in a later work, the Italian Prophéties de Merlin). The Lady also works to actively encourage Lancelot and Guinevere's relationship and its consummation (that includes sending Guinevere a symbolically illustrated magic shield, the crack in which closes up after the queen finally spends her first night with him) and personally arrives to restore Lancelot to sanity during some of his recurring periods of madness (one of such occasions has her use the same shield to heal his mind).

=== Merlin's beloved and captor ===
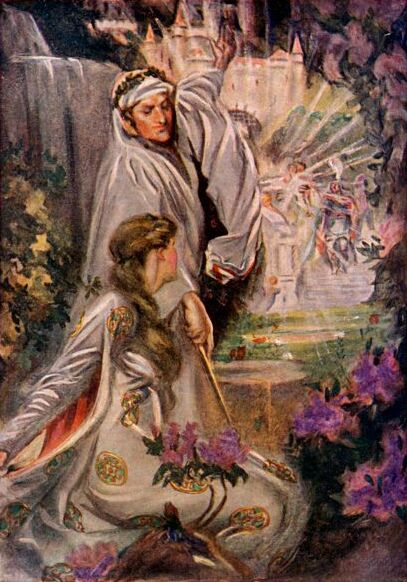
Merlin and Vivienne, Otway McCannell's illustration for Lewis Spence's Legends and Romances of Brittany (1917)

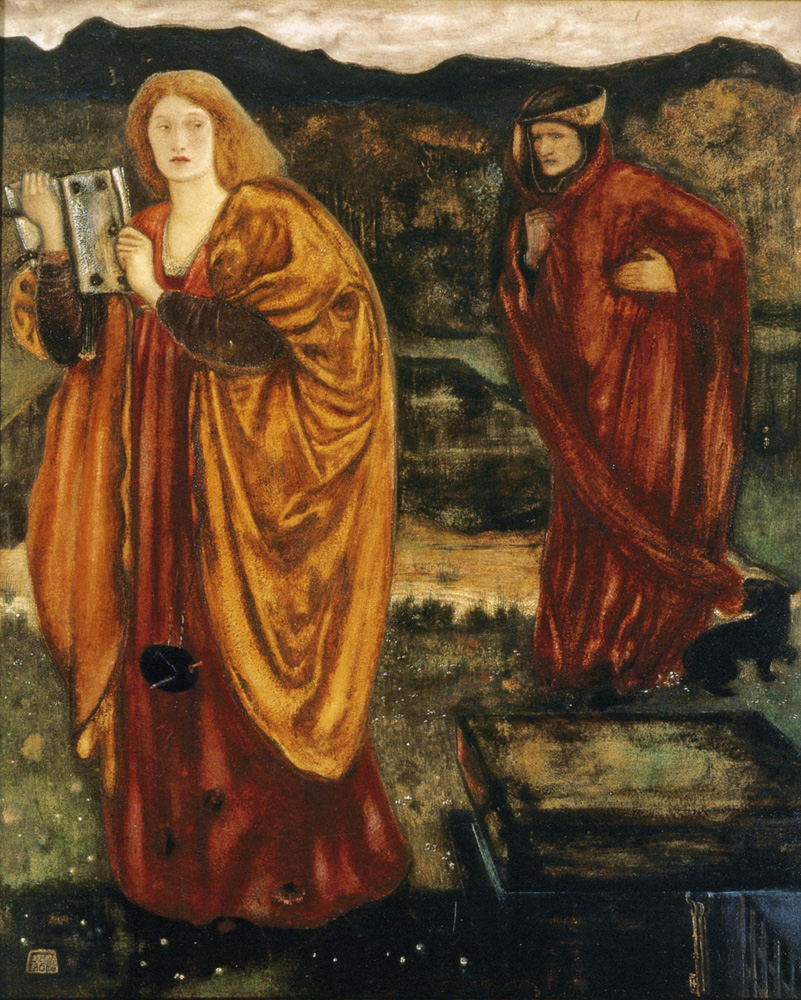
Edward Burne-Jones' Merlin and Nimüe (1861) using a new form of her name "Nimue" popularised by William Caxton

The Vulgate Cycle, in its segment of the Prose Merlin continuation, was first to tell of the story of (depending on the version) either a different or the same Lady of the Lake that Merlin falls in love with, typically his feelings for her being unrequited. There, she also uses other names, including Elaine. As a result of their usually final encounter, Merlin almost always either dies or at very least is never seen again.

The story takes place before the main Vulgate Cycle section, Lancelot, but was written later, linking her with the disappearance of Merlin in the romance tradition of Arthurian legend. She is given the name Viviane (or similar) and a human origin, although she is still being called a fairy by the authors. In the Vulgate Merlin, Viviane refuses to give Merlin (who at this time is already old but appears to her in the guise of a handsome young man) her love until he has taught her all his secrets, after which she uses her power to seal him by making him sleep forever. The text explains this by a spell she put "on her groin which, as long as it lasted, prevented anyone from deflowering her and having relations with her." In an alternative Bristol Merlin fragment, she resists his seduction with the help of a magic ring during the week they spend together.

Though Merlin knows beforehand that this will happen due to his power of foresight, he is unable to counteract her because of the 'truth' this ability of foresight holds. He decides to do nothing for his situation other than to continue to teach her his secrets until she takes the opportunity to get rid of him. Consequently, she entraps and entombs her unresisting mentor within a tree, in a hole underneath a large stone, or inside a cave, depending on the version of this story as it is told in the different texts. In the Prophéties de Merlin, for instance, Viviane is especially cruel in the way she disposes of Merlin, making him die a long death inside his tomb while taunting him. There, she is proud of how Merlin had never taken her virginity, unlike what happened with his other female students, such as Morgan.

The Post-Vulgate revision has Viviane described as causing Merlin's death out of her hatred of him. Conversely, the Livre d'Artus, a late alternative (and updated) variant of the Prose Lancelot, shows a completely peaceful scene taking place under a blooming hawthorn tree where Merlin is lovingly put to sleep by Viviane, as it is required by his destined fate that she has learned of. He then wakes up inside an impossibly high and indestructible tower, invisible from the outside, where she will come to meet him there almost every day or night—a motif reminiscent of Ganieda's visits of Merlin's house in an earlier version of his life as described by Geoffrey of Monmouth in the Vita Merlini.

In the Prophéties de Merlin, she then takes Tristan's half-brother Meliadus the Younger, also raised by her along with Lancelot, as her actual lover who then convinces her to access Merlin's tomb to record his prophecies while Merlin is still alive. The Lancelot-Grail, too, has Viviane take a lover, in this case the evil king Brandin of the Isles, whom she teaches some magic that he then applies to his terrible castle Dolorous Gard. In the Vulgate Merlin, an unnamed lady, possibly Viviane, abortively turns King Brandegorre's son Evadeam into the deformed Dwarf Knight for refusing her love. In the Post-Vulgate Merlin, Viviane later protects Arthur from Morgan through her magical interventions.

In her backstory in the Vulgate Merlin, Viviane was a daughter of the knight Dionas (Dyonas) and a niece of the Duke of Burgundy. According to the Post-Vulgate, she was born in Dionas' domain that included the fairy forests of Briosque (Brocéliande) and Darnantes, and it was an enchantment of her fairy godmother, Diana the Huntress Goddess, that caused Viviane to be so alluring to Merlin when she first met him there as a young teenager. The narrator informs the reader that, back "in the time of Virgil", Diana had been a Queen of Sicily that was considered a goddess by her subjects. The Post-Vulgate Suite de Merlin describes how Viviane was born and lived in a magnificent castle at the foot of a mountain in Brittany as a daughter of the King of Northumbria. Here, she is initially known as the beautiful 15-year-old Damsel Huntress (Damoiselle Chasseresse) in her introductory episode, in which she serves the role of a damsel in distress in the adventure of the three knights separately sent by Merlin to rescue her from kidnapping; the quest is soon completed by King Pellinore who tracks down and kills her abductor.

The Post-Vulgate rewrite also describes how Diana had killed her partner Faunus to be with a man named Felix, but then she was herself killed by her lover at that lake, which came to be called the Lake of Diana (Lac Diane). This is presumably the place where Lancelot of the Lake is later raised, at first not knowing his real parentage, by Viviane. Nevertheless, only the narration of the Vulgate Cycle actually makes it clear that its Lady of the Lake (that is Lancelot's adoptive mother) and Viviane are in fact the one and same character in the French romances. Viviane is also only 12 when she meets Merlin in the Forest of Briosque in the Vulgate Merlin.

=== Giver of Excalibur ===
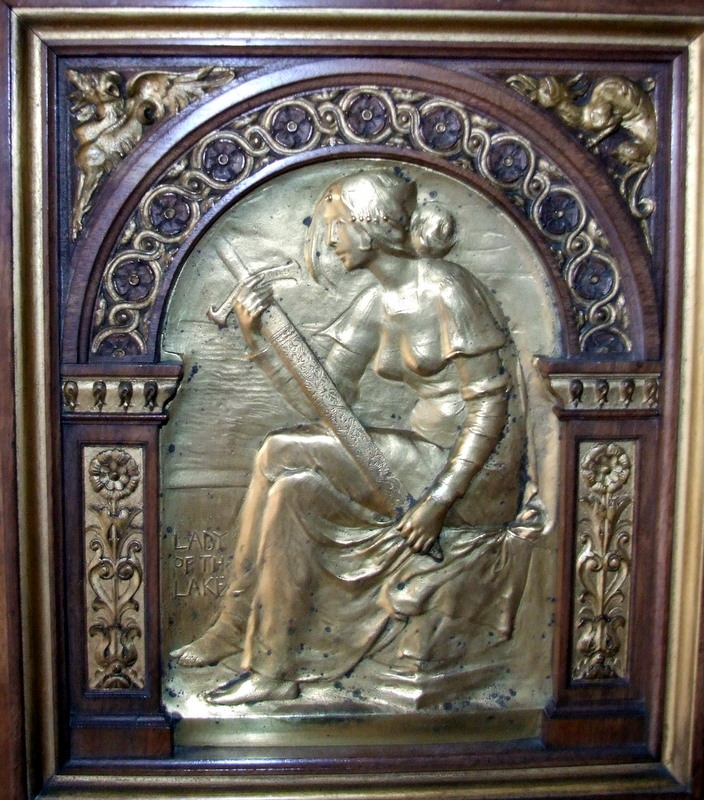
"The Lady of the Lake", George Frampton's relief at Two Temple Place

Another, unnamed Lady of the Lake appears in the Post-Vulgate tradition to bestow the magic sword Excalibur from Avalon to Arthur in a now iconic scene. She is presented as a mysterious early benefactor of the young King Arthur, who is directed and led to her by Merlin. Appearing in her lake, she grants him Excalibur and its special scabbard after his original (also unnamed) sword breaks in the duel against King Pellinore. She is a mysterious character who is evidently neither Morgan nor the Damsel Huntress, but may possibly have a connection to the Lady of Avalon (Dame d'Avalon) from the Propheties de Merlin.

Later in the Post-Vulgate Suite du Merlin, either this Lady of the Lake personally or one of her damsels (her identity is unclear, as, despite her explicit connection with the Excalibur episode, the woman is not actually identified as the "Lady of the Lake" in this scene) comes to King Arthur's court, where she is suddenly attacked and beheaded by Sir Balin. It comes as a result of a kin feud between them (she blames Balin for the death of variably either her brother or her lover, while he blames her for the death of his mother, who had been burned at the stake) and a dispute over another enchanted sword from Avalon. Her body later vanishes.

All this takes place relatively early in the Post-Vulgate Merlin Continuation, during the time when Merlin is still at Arthur's side and prior to the introduction of the young Viviane in the same part of the cycle. Modern retellings, however, usually make this Lady of the Lake the same character as Viviane, while also omitting the Balin episode.

=== Other identities and relations ===
In some cases, it is uncertain whether Morgan and the Lady of the Lake are identical or separate characters. Richard Cavendish wrote: "It may be that the two sides of Morgan's nature separated into two different characters and that the Lady of the Lake is an aspect of Morgan herself. If so, the two fays represent the two aspects [...] fertile and destructive, motherly and murderous, loving and cruel."

According to Anne Berthelot, Morgan herself should be considered "the Lady of the Lake", as compared to the "upstart magician" Viviane in the French prose cycles. The 13th/14th-century English poem Of Arthour and of Merlin explicitly gives the role of Lady of the Lake to Morgan, explaining her association with the name "Nimiane" (Ninniane) by just having her residing near a town called Nimiane. Morgan is also depicted as a fairy from a lake (with an underwater and invisible castle that can be accessed only with a guide water dragon) in the Italian tale Cantari del Falso Scudo, and as a former student of her fellow fairy Viviana in the French romance Claris et Laris.

The 15th-century Italian prose La Tavola Ritonda (The Round Table) makes the Lady a daughter of Uther Pendragon and thus a sister to both Morgan the Fairy (Fata Morgana) and Arthur. Here she is a character mischievous to the extent that her own brother Arthur swears to burn her at the stake (as he also threatens to do with Morgan). This version of her briefly kidnaps Lancelot when he is an adult (along with Guinevere and Tristan and Isolde), a motif usually associated with Morgan; here it is also Morgan herself who sends the magical shield to Guinevere in an act recast as having malicious intent. The Lady is also described as Morgan's sister in some other Italian texts, such as the 13th-century poem Pulzella Gaia. Mike Ashley identified Viviane with one of Arthur's other sisters, the otherwise obscure Elaine.

In the 14th-century French prose romance Perceforest, a lengthy romance prequel to the Arthurian legend, the figures of the Lady of the Lake and of the enchantress Sebile have been merged to create the character of Sebile [the Lady] of the Lake (Sébil[l]e [la Dame] du Lac, named as such due to her residence of the Castle of the Lake later known as the Red Castle), who is depicted as an ancestor of Arthur himself from her union with King Alexander (Alexander the Great). The later Lady of the Lake who raises Lancelot is also mentioned in Perceforest, where both hers and Merlin's ancestry lines are derived from the ancient Fairy Morgane (Morg[u]ane la Faee / la Fée, living in a castle on the Isle of Zeeland). Here, their shared ancestors have been born from an illicit love between her beautiful daughter Morg[u]anette and Passelion, an amorous young human protégé of the mischievous spirit Zephir, hundreds years earlier when Morgane cursed them so that one of their descendants would one day kill the other.

== Le Morte d'Arthur ==
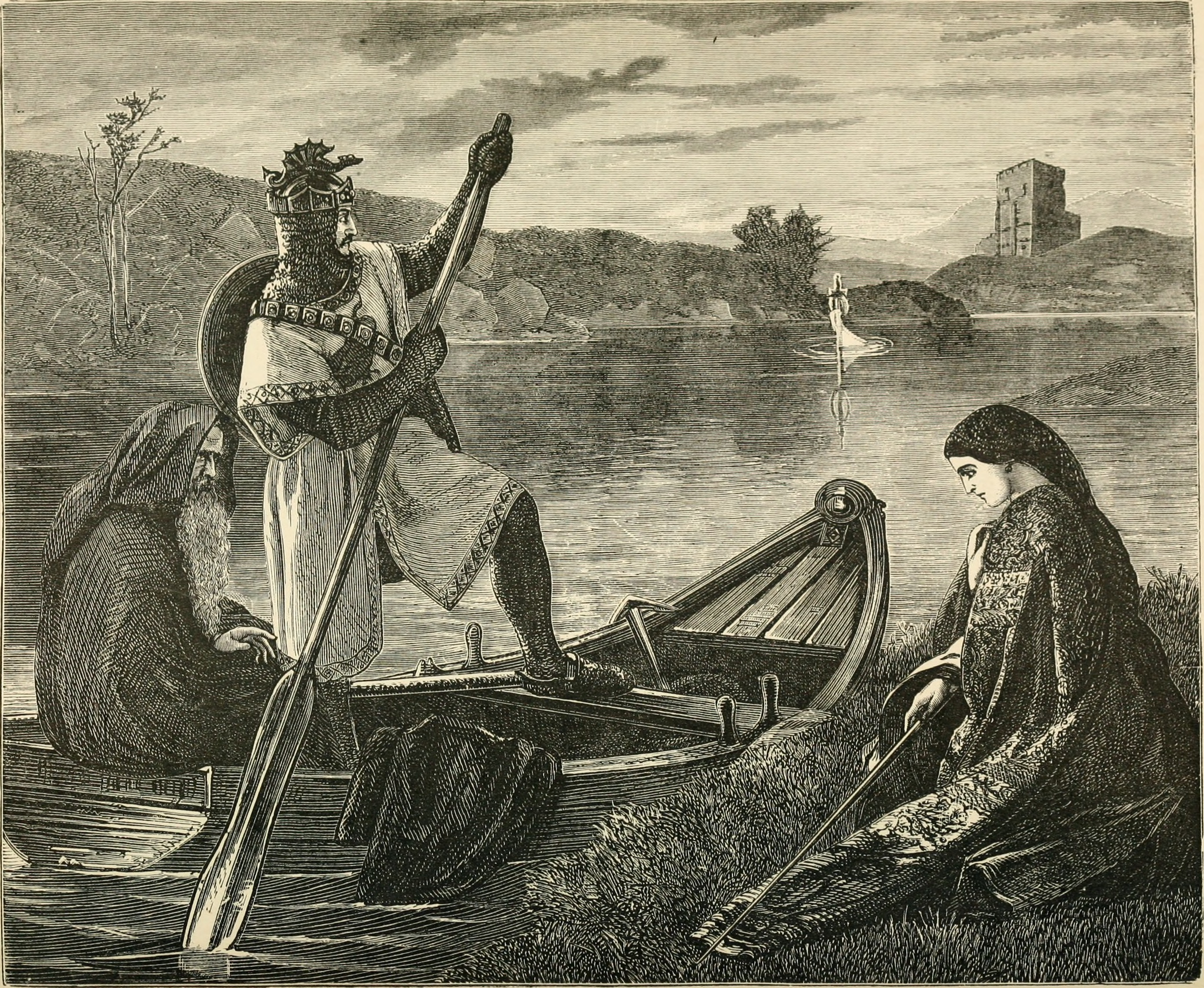
The gift of the sword Excalibur in an illustration for George Melville Baker's Ballads of Bravery (1877)

In Thomas Malory's 15th-century compilation of Arthurian stories that is often considered definitive in much of the world today, the first Lady of the Lake remains unnamed besides this epithet. When the young King Arthur, accompanied by his mentor Merlin, comes to her lake in need of a sword (the original sword-from-the-stone having been recently broken in battle), he sees an arm extending from the surface of the water holding a sword; Merlin identifies this arm as belonging to another Lady of the Lake. Arthur, informed by Merlin that the Lady can grant him the sword, requests the sword from the Lady and is granted permission to go out upon the lake and take it if he promises to fulfill any request from her later, to which he agrees.

Later, when the Lady comes with her damsel to Camelot to hold Arthur to his promise, she asks for the head of Balin the Savage, whom she blames for her brother's death. However, Arthur refuses this request. Instead it is Balin, claiming that "by enchantment and sorcery she has been the destroyer of many good knights", who swiftly decapitates her with his own magic sword (a cursed blade that had been stolen by him from a mysterious lady from Avalon just a moment earlier) in front of Arthur and then sends off his squire with her severed head, much to the distress and shame of the king under whose protection she should have been there. Arthur gives the Lady a rich burial, has her slayer banished despite Merlin telling him Balin would become Arthur's greatest knight, and gives his permission for the Irish prince Launcenor to go after Balin to avenge this disgrace by killing him.

Malory does not tell of Lancelot's upbringing by his Viviane character (i.e. Nimue), as the knight's foster mother is only mentioned by him once and off hand as one of the (unnamed) Ladies of the Lake. It may be so because Malory had only access to the Suite du Merlin part of the Post-Vulgate Cycle as a relevant source for this part of his telling.

=== Nimue ===
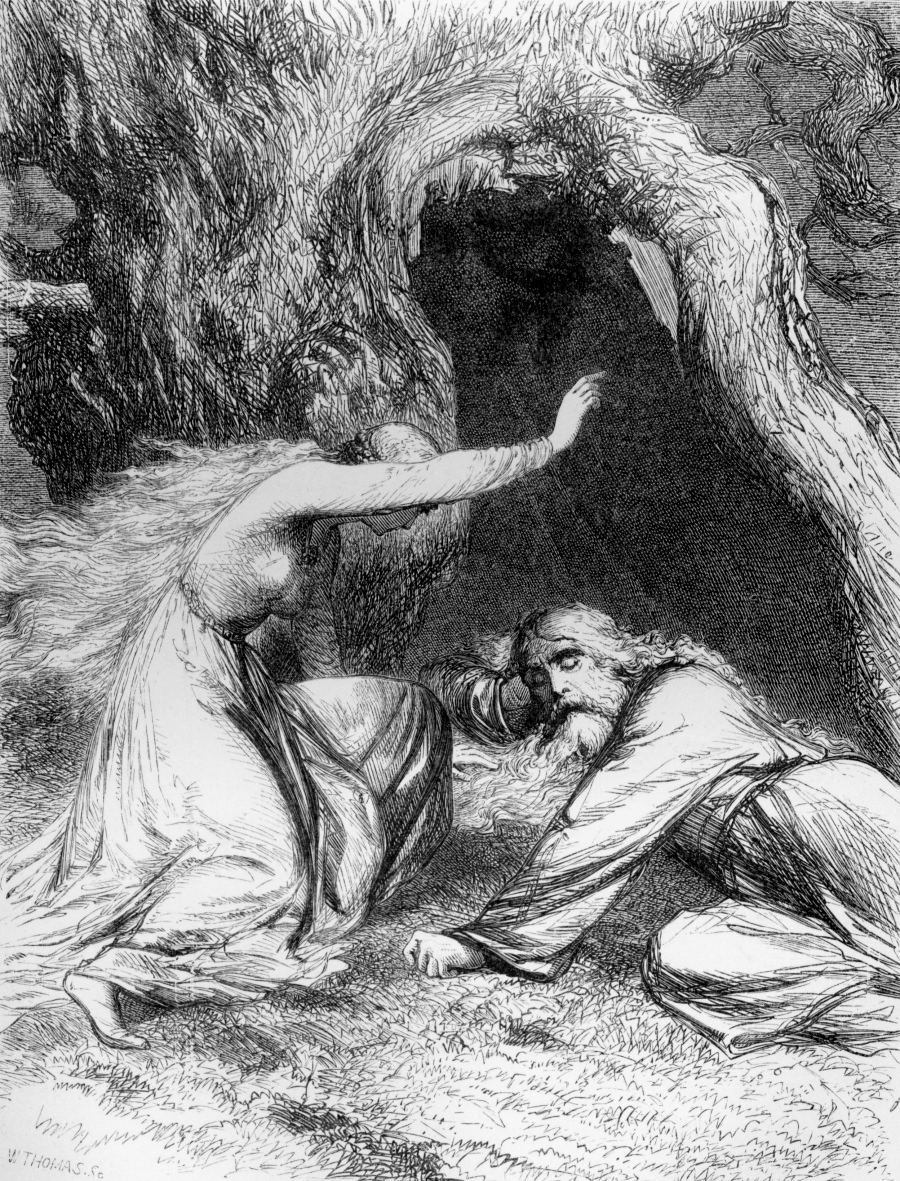
Nimue imprisoning Merlin in an illustration by George Housman Thomas for The Story of King Arthur and His Knights of the Round Table, adapted from Le Morte d'Arthur by James Thomas Knowles (1862)

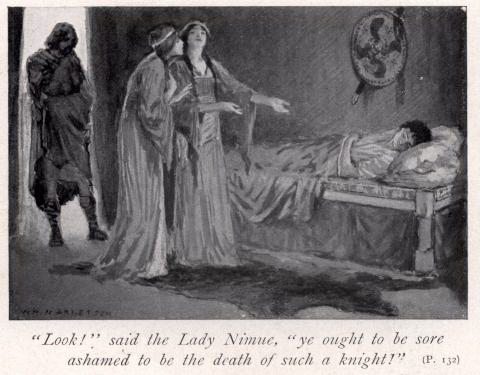
"'Look!', said the Lady Nimue, 'Ye ought to be sore ashamed to be the death of such a knight!'", William Henry Margetson's illustration for Legends of King Arthur and His Knights, adapted from Malory by Janet MacDonald Clark (1914)

The most important of Malory's Lady of the Lake characters is sometimes referred to by her title and sometimes referred to by name, today best known as Nimue (Caxton's print variant), which was rendered Nynyve in Malory's original Winchester Manuscript. Malory initially describes Nimue (Nynyve) as "one of the damsels of the Lady of the Lake", and repeatedly as both the "Damsel of the Lake" and the "Lady of the Lake", before ultimately calling her the "chief Lady of the Lake" at the end.

Nimue first appears at the wedding of Arthur and Guinevere, as the young huntress rescued by Pellinore. She then plays an important role in the Arthurian court throughout the story, performing some of the same actions as the Lady of the Lake of Malory's sources, but with differences. For instance, in the Post-Vulgate Suite du Merlin (Malory's main source for the earliest parts of Le Morte d'Arthur), the Lady of the Lake traps Merlin in a tomb, which results in his death. She does this out of cruelty and a hatred of Merlin. In Le Morte d'Arthur, on the other hand, Nimue is still the one to trap Merlin, but Malory gives her a sympathetic reason: Merlin falls in love with her and will not leave her alone; Malory gives no indication that Nimue loves him back. Eventually, since she cannot free herself of him otherwise, she decides to trap him under rock and makes sure he cannot escape. She is tired of his sexual advances, and afraid of his power as "a devil's son", so she does not have much of a choice but to ultimately get rid of him.

After enchanting Merlin, Malory's Nimue replaces him as Arthur's magician aide and trusted adviser. When Arthur himself is in need in Malory's text, some incarnation of the Lady of the Lake, or her magic, or her agent, reaches out to help him. For instance, she saves Arthur from a magical attempt on his life made by his sister Morgan le Fay and from the death at the hands of Morgan's lover Accolon as in the Post-Vulgate, and together with Tristan frees Arthur from the lustful sorceress Annowre in a motif taken from the Prose Tristan. In Malory's version, Brandin of the Isles, renamed Brian (Bryan), is Nimue's evil cousin rather than her paramour. Nimue instead becomes the lover and eventually wife of Pelleas, a gentle young knight whom she then also puts under her protection so "that he was never slain by her days."

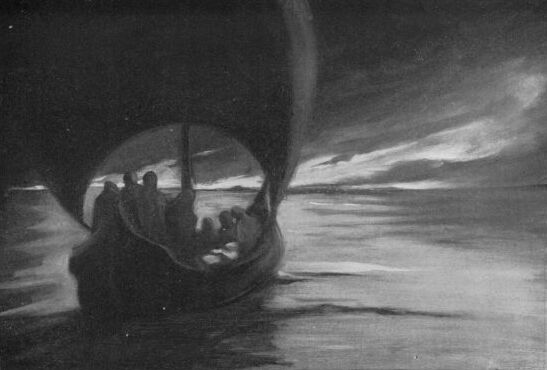
The Passing of Arthur in Andrew Lang's Stories of King Arthur and His Knights (1904)

In the end, a female hand emerging from a lake reclaims Excalibur in a miraculous scene when the sword is thrown into the water by Bedivere just after Arthur's final battle. Malory's narration then counts the "chief Lady of the Lake" Nimue among the magical queens who arrive in a black boat with Morgan (in the original account in the Vulgate Cycle's Mort Artu, the chief lady in the boat, seen holding hands with Morgan and calling for Arthur, is not recognised by Girflet who is this scene's witness instead of Malory's Bedivere). Together, they bear the mortally wounded Arthur away to Avalon.

In an analysis by Kenneth Hodges, Nimue appears through the story as the chivalric code changes, hinting to the reader that something new will happen in order to help the author achieve the wanted interpretation of the Arthurian legend: each time she reappears in Le Morte d'Arthur, it is at a pivotal moment of the episode, establishing the importance of her character within Arthurian literature, as she transcends any notoriety attached to her character by aiding Arthur and other knights to succeed in their endeavors, subtly helping sway the court in the right direction. According to Hodges, when Malory was looking at other texts to find inspiration, he chose the best aspects of all the other Lady of the Lake characters, making her pragmatic, compassionate, clever, and strong-willed. Nevertheless, Nimue's character is often seen as still very ambiguous by other scholars. As summarized by Amy S. Kaufman:

"Though Nynyve is sometimes friendly to Arthur and his knights, she is equally liable to act in her own interest. She can be also selfish, ruthless, desiring, and capricious. She has been identified as a deceptive and anti-patriarchal equally as often as she has been cast as a benevolent aid to Arthur's court, or even the literary descendant of protective goddesses."

== Lake ==
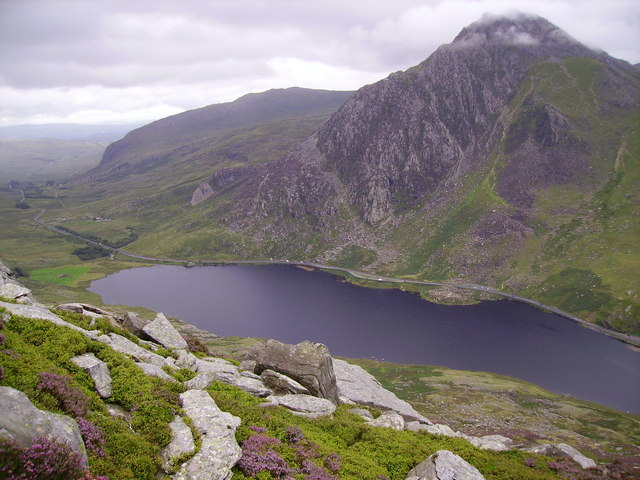
Llyn Ogwen as seen from the slopes of Pen yr Ole Wen in 2008

A number of locations are traditionally associated with the Lady of the Lake's abode. Such places within Great Britain include the lakes Dozmary Pool and The Loe in Cornwall, the lakes Llyn Llydaw and Llyn Ogwen in Eryri, River Brue's area of Pomparles Bridge in Somerset, and the lake Loch Arthur in Scotland.

In France, Viviane is also connected with Brittany's Paimpont forest, often identified as the Arthurian enchanted forest of Brocéliande, where her lake (that is, the Lake of Diana) is said to be located at the castle Château de Comper. The oldest localization of the Lake is in the Lancelot en prose, written around 1230: the place where Lancelot is raised is described there as to the north of Trèves-Cunault, on the Loire, in the middle of the (now extinct) forest of Beaufort-en-Vallée (the "Bois en Val" of the book).

== Modern culture ==
In 1575, Robert Dudley, 1st Earl of Leicester, prepared an Arthurian themed revel for the visiting Queen Elizabeth I, the climax of which was the appearance of a Lady of the Lake as a mermaid. The full French name of the University of Notre Dame, founded in 1842, is Notre Dame du Lac. Meaning "Our Lady of the Lake", it makes reference to Mary, mother of Jesus as the Lady of the Lake in a fusion between Arthurian legend and Catholicism.

Modern authors of Arthurian fiction adapt the legend of the Lady of the Lake in various ways, sometimes using two or more bearers of this title while others choose to emphasize a single character. Typically influenced by Thomas Malory's telling of the story, fantasy writers tend to give their version of Merlin a sorcerous female enemy, usually either Nimue, Morgan (often perceived as more plausible in this role due to her established enmity with Arthur in much of the legend), or Morgan's sister Morgause. Various characters of the Lady (or Ladies) of the Lake appear in many works, including poems, novels, films, television series, stage productions, comics, and games. Though her identity may change, her role as a significant figure in the lives of Arthur and Merlin usually remains consistent.

=== Literary works and their adaptations ===
==== Early ====
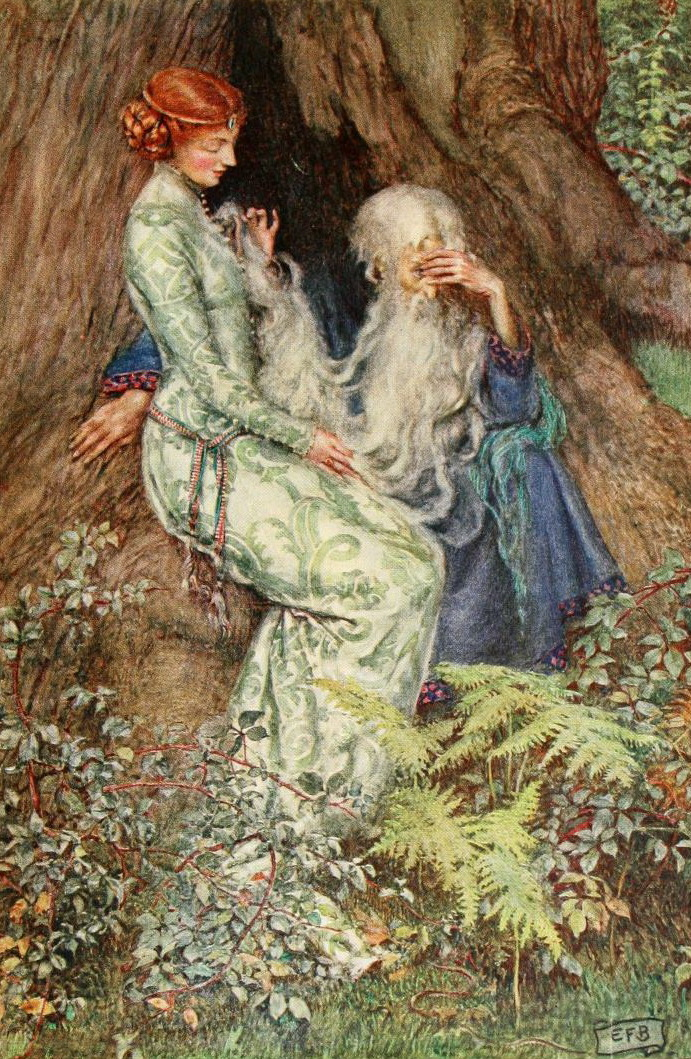
"O master, do you love my tender rhyme?" Vivien and Merlin in Eleanor Fortescue-Brickdales' illustration for Tennyson's Idylls of the King (1913)

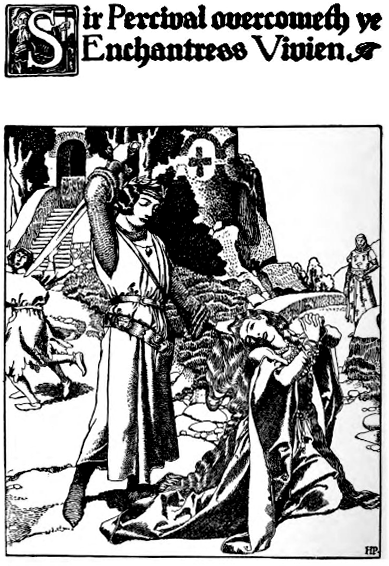
Percival defeating the Tennyson-inspired evil Vivien (then sparing her life after she pleads mercy) in Howard Pyle's 1905 illustration for The Story of the Champions of the Round Table: "Therefore he cried out with a loud voice and seized the enchantress by her long golden hair, and drew her so violently forward that she fell down upon her knees."

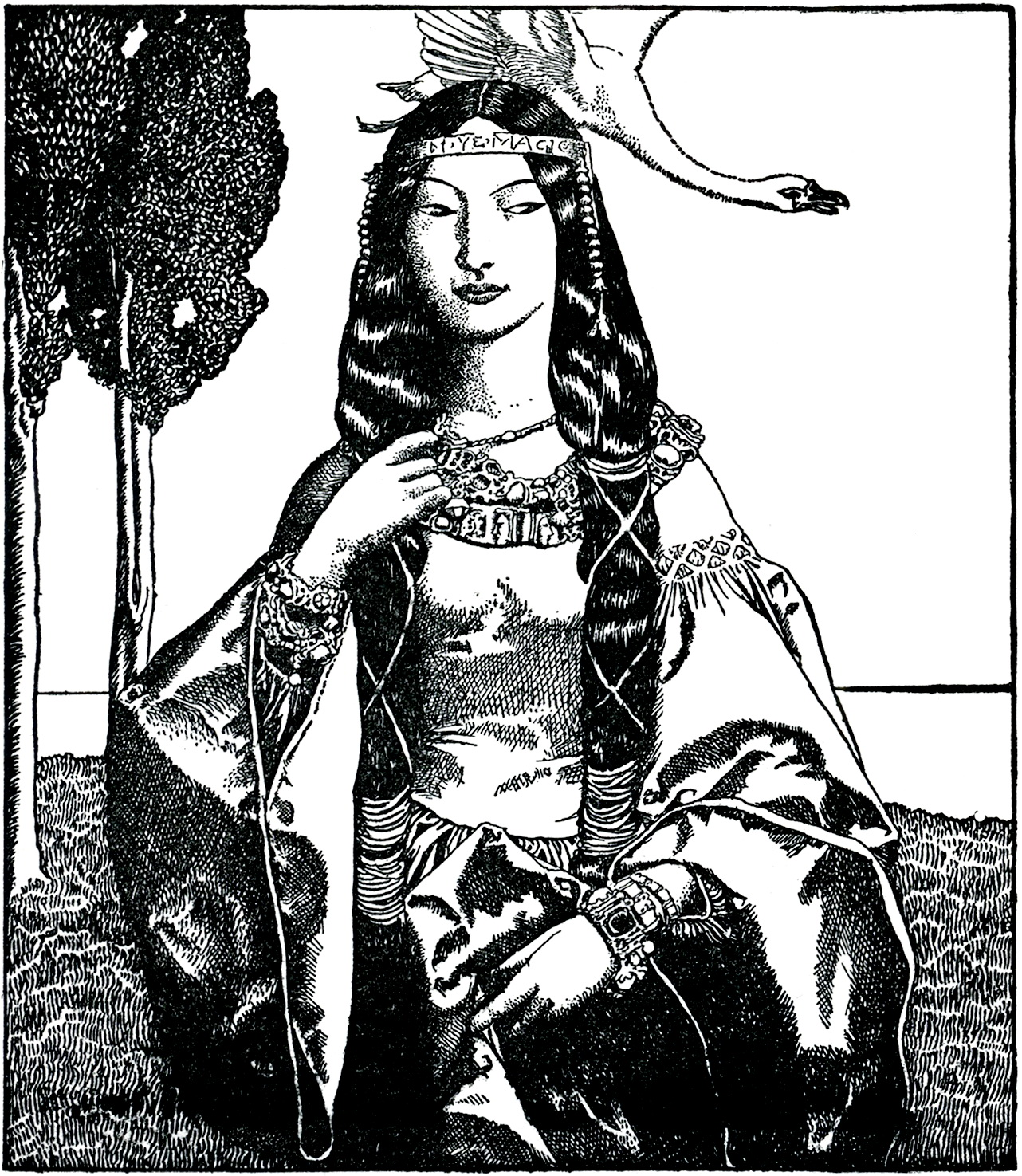
The good Nimue (separate from Vivien) in Pyle's The Story of King Arthur and His Knights (1903)

Alfred, Lord Tennyson adapted several stories of the Lady of the Lake for his influential poetic cycle Idylls of the King (1859–1885). He split her into two characters: Nimue or Vivien (her name was changed later by the author) is a Circe-like deceitful villainess and an associate of King Mark and Mordred, who first fails to seduce Arthur but then succeeds in ensnaring Merlin in "Merlin and Vivien", while the (unnamed) Lady of the Lake is a guardian angel style benevolent figure who raises Lancelot and gives Arthur his sword. Vivien also appears to corrupt Balin with her lies in "Balin and Balan".

Tennyson's version been adapted into or inspired many other works, such as two songs both titled "Vivien's Song", by John Barnett (1859) and Arthur Barkworth (1874). Oscar Fay Adams parodied it in his 1886 poem "Thomas and Vivien".

- Walter Scott's 1810 poem The Lady of the Lake drew on the romance of the legend, but with an entirely different story set around Loch Katrine in the Trossachs of Scotland.
  - Scott's material furnished subject matter for La donna del lago, an 1819 opera by Gioachino Rossini.
  - Franz Schubert set seven songs from Scott's Lady of the Lake, including the three "Ellen songs" ("Ellens Gesang I", "Ellens Gesang II", and "Ellens Gesang III"), although Schubert's music to Ellen's third song has become far more famous in its later adaptation as "Ave Maria".
- William Wordsworth's 1831 poem The Egyptian Maid or The Romance of the Water-Lily features the Lady of the Lake Nina, who, inverting Nimue's role in Malory, brings Merlin out of his cave and back to Arthur's court.
- Robert Buchanan's 1838 poem "Merlin's Tomb" about Merlin's entrapment by Viviane.
  - In Buchanan's more original "Merlin and the White Death" (1864), Merlin "recounts how he sought Union, the Lady of the Lake (the beautiful 'water-witch'), in order to learn her secrets and to break her power over men."
- Sallie Bridges' 1857 poem "Merlin's Grave" tells of Merlin's love for her leading to his entrapment under the stone.
- Heilmann Wilson's 1894 poem "Merlin and Vivien".
- Madison J. Cawein's poems "Her Eyes" (1898), "In the Forest" (1907), and "The Thorn-Tree" (in the 1911 sequence "Deep in the Forest"), all based on Merlin's entrapment by Vivien.
- W. B. Maxwell's 1905 novel Vivien, set in England at the turn of the 20th century.
- In Coningsby Dawson's 1911 novel The Road to Avalon, Vivienne guards Merlin in his enchanted sleep in Broceliande.
- In Gladys Skelton's poem "Wisdom and Youth", the arrival of Vivian ends Merlin's dreams that bring him his knowledge of all things.
- James Branch Cabell's 1916 poem "Ballad of the Destroyer" compares Vivian to Death.
  - Cabell's 1921 novel Jurgen has its eponymous time-travelling protagonist associate with the Lady of the Lake in the time of Arthur.
- Padraic Colum's 1920 novel The Boy Apprenticed to an Enchanter includes the story of Merlin and Vivien.
- George V. A. McCloskey's "Nimue to Merlin" (1927) is a poem spoken by Nimue trying to make him stay with her in Broceliande.
- "The Childhood of Sir Bors", a part of Beatrice Saxon Snell's unfinished serial novel Excalibur: The Chronicle of the Fellowship of the Round Table (1934–1936) telling of his fostering by a Lady of the Lake in Avalon.
- Philip Lindsay's novel The Little Wench (1935) includes the story of Merlin and Nimue among these of other lovers (the book's title refers to Guinevere).
- Vivian Smallwood King's poem "Merlin to Vivien" (1936).
- In Robert Clark Schaller's poem "The Throne of Merlin" (1937), Merlin builds a throne to reach the realm of the gods, Avilion, but destroys his creation after a warning from the Lady.
- John MacCormac's 1939 short story "The Enchanted Weekend" about an American historian coming to a mysterious Cornish castle. He meets Niniane's magic-wielding descendant by the same name and they fall in love with each other.
- John Erskine's "The Tale of Merlin and One of the Ladies of the Lake" (1940) retells the story by having Merlin swallowed into the ground.
- Nimue appears in T. H. White's book series The Once and Future King as a water nymph and Merlyn's enchantress. True to the legend she traps Merlin in a cave, but White's Merlyn does not convey it as negative, and even refers to it as a holiday. They thus disappear together near the beginning of The Ill-Made Knight (1940); Merlyn later returns in The Book of Merlyn.
- In Henry Kuttner's 1943 short story "Wet Magic", a WWII pilot is shot down into Morgan's lake, where he meets Morgan and Vivienne, as well as Merlin who "has locked himself in a tree to get away from Vivienne".
- The legend of the Lady of the Lake is featured in Leslie Barringer's Shy Leopardess (1948), including being told by a character within the story and having the main character being compared to her.
- John Myers Myers' novel Silverlock (1949) features Nimue as a fairy lady who had imprisoned Merlin and enchanted Accolon.

==== Since 1950—2000 ====
- Nineue ferch Afallach (Tennyson's Vivien) is a fairy enchantress in John Cowper Powys's novel Porius: A Romance of the Dark Ages (1951). In Welsh mythology, Modron ("divine mother") was a daughter of Avallach; she was derived from the Gaulish goddess Matrona and may have been the prototype of Morgan. The novel ends with the protagonist Porius saving the wizard Myrddin (the story's Merlin figure) from his entombment by Nineue on the summit of Snowdon, Wales' highest mountain.
- In Alan Garner's 1960 novel The Weirdstone of Brisingamen: A Tale of Alderley, inspired by the tale of the Wizard of Alderley Edge, the Lady of the Lake appears as the magical wife of one of the sleeping knights in a cave in the 20th century.
- J. T. McIntosh's 1960 science-fiction short story "Merlin", set on a spaceship of an alien civilisation fascinated by the Arthurian legend, Vivian is a companion of Princess Guinevere and a part of their love triangle involving an engineer named after Merlin.
- Emma Sterne's and Barbara Lindsay's King Arthur and the Knights of the Round Table (1962) retells Malory, including by connecting Perceval to the story of Merlin and Vivian.
- J. M. Singer's poem 1962 "The Lady of the Lake" in which apparently Merlin tries to seduce Vivian.
- Margaret Atwood's 1963 poem "Recollections of Vivien" (a part of Avalon Revisited) has her in Broceliande after having imprisoned Merlin.
- Donald J. Sobol's post-Arthurian novel Greta the Strong (1970) telling of a farmer girl's quest to find the Lady of the Lake and Excalibur.
- In Robert Nathan's novel The Elixir (1971), an American historian falls in love with a mysterious magical woman, eventually revealed as Nimue, and travels with her through time to visit various points in the British history.
- Sally Purcell's 1971 poem "Magician Meditating" includes the section titled "Nimuë", where Merlin "reflects upon (...) the woman who will imprison him".
- Marilyn Hacker's poem "Nimue to Merlin" (1972) is a dramatic monologue by Nimue seducing him in her tower.
- Mary Leader's 1973 novel Triad connects the Welsh goddess Rhiannon with the Lady of the Lake (Niniane / Vivien).
- Vivian is a granddaughter of Merlin in Vera Chapman's The Green Knight (1975), partly narrated by Vivian herself, where she is raised and trained in magic by the evil Morgan and forced to marry Bertilak. A son of her and Gawain the Younger (Gareth's son) named Ambris appears in King Arthur's Daughter (1976).
  - Another Vivian is the main protagonist of Chapman's 1998 novel The Enchantresses, where she is a sister of Morgan (who is the one behind the entrapment of Merlin while in Vivian's shape) and Morgause. It tells the story of her life, including "her marriage and status as Lady of the Lake, her acquiring of Caliburn, to Morgan’s murder of her." A part of the story had been earlier published as the short story "Belle Dame, Sans Merci".
- In Andre Norton's science fantasy novel Merlin's Mirror (1975), Nimue is an alien enemy of Merlin, here also a being of an extreterrastial origin.
  - Norton's short story "The Last Spell" (in Ancient Enchantresses, 1995) tells a more usual story of Nimue and Merlin.
  - In Norton's another short story, "Root and Branch Shall Change" (in Merlin, 1999), Nimue had once imprisoned Merlin to protect him from Morgause and now prepares to undo her spell so his magic may save a post-apocalyptic Earth.

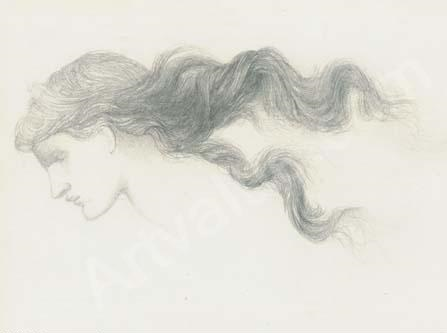
Study for the head of Nimue for The Beguiling of Merlin (c. 1872)

- Robert Kelly's 1978 poem "The Beguiling of Merlin", based on Burne-Jones' 1877 painting by the same title, "reflects not just on the painting and the story of Merlin and Nimue, but on our society's ideas about love and sex."
- Mary Stewart's 1979 novel The Last Enchantment in her Merlin series radically recasts the story of Merlin and Niniane (Nimue), completely removing the aspect of malicious seduction and treachery dominant in the traditional version; it is the witch Morgause, the mother of Mordred (with Mordred notably undergoing a similarly revisionist treatment as Nimue), who takes Nimue's traditional role and then continues as the chief villain. In this depiction, after she saves him from being poisoned by Morgause, Merlin takes Niniane on as an apprentice, with her at first disguised as a boy named Ninian, and willingly teaches her his magic, which he had refused to Morgause. When her identity as a woman is discovered, they fall in love despite their age difference. Their love is peaceful and idyllic; even when Nimue marries Pelleas, this is not a betrayal of Merlin. As Merlin gives her the secrets of his power and how to control it, he seems to lose them himself, which he does not mind. In a depleted, weakened condition, he falls into a coma, and is believed to be dead. Nimue has him buried within his "crystal cave", from which he escapes after a few weeks, through a combination of chance luck and ingenious planning, and travels incognito to let Arthur know he is still alive and can help him against Morgause and Morgan. Nimue takes Merlin's place as the court enchanter, while Merlin retires to the crystal cave and lives a quiet and happy life as a hermit. Niniane takes his place and role to the degree she even proclaims "I am Merlin", thus creating a 'Nimue-Merlin' character. Believing him dead, Nimue "marries Peleas and takes on the role of Goddess or Lady of the Lake in Ynis Witrin (Glastonbury)." Stewart's The Prince and the Pilgrim (1995) features Nimue as Arthur's royal enchantress.
- A Dream of Fair Serpents (1979) by Maureen Peters (as Catherine Darby) features Vivien as a group of Arthurian characters reincarnating throughout British history from the Roman era till the late 20th century in a long quest to save the world.
  - Another Vivien character appears in Peters' (Darby's) 1984 Sangreal, an Arthurian-inspired story set in 1790.
- In Lorna Crozier's poem "Nimue and Merlin" (Humans and Other Beasts, 1980), Nimue "reflects upon the various stories about how she imprisoned Merlin (...) but claims she's actually carrying him, reduced in size, in a pocket."
- Keith Taylor's novel Bard (1981) introduces the character of Vivayn the Sorceress (Vivian), wife of Cynric. In Bard III: The Wild Sea (1986), she flees from him with the help of Niamh (Morgan).
- Niniane is featured in Fred Saberhagen's novel Dominion (1982).
  - As Vivian, she is also featured in Saberhagen's unrelated novel Merlin's Bones (1995).
- Vivian is one of the protagonists of C. J. Cherryh's 1982 science-fiction novel Port Eternity, based on the Arthurian relationships from Tennyson's version.

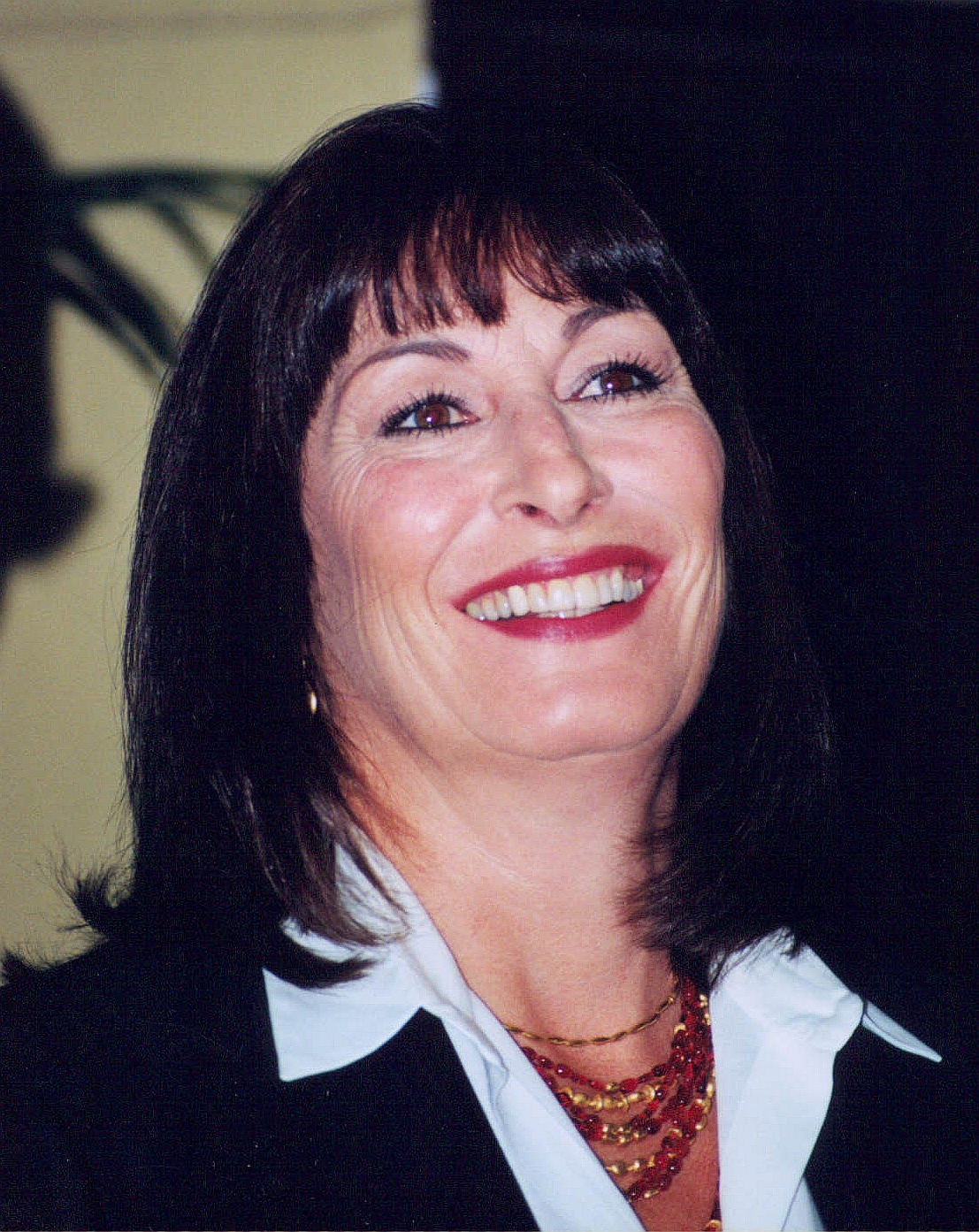
Anjelica Huston played High Lady Viviane in the television miniseries The Mists of Avalon

- Marion Zimmer Bradley's 1983 novel The Mists of Avalon, a feminist retelling of the legend, expands on the tradition of multiple Ladies, with Viviane, Niniane, and Nimue all being separate characters. In Bradley's works, both the 'Lady of the Lake' and the 'Merlin' are names of offices in the Celtic pagan hierarchy: the Lady of the Lake is the title of the ruling priestess of Avalon, and the Merlin is a druid who has pledged his life to the protection of Britain. Various tragic characters assume the title of the Lady of the Lake, including Viviane, the initial High Priestess of Avalon, Arthur's aunt, and Lancelot's mother who ends up killed by Balin (here as her other son Balan's foster-brother); Niniane, Taliesin's daughter and yet another of Arthur's half-sisters who reluctantly becomes the Lady of the Lake after Viviane is slain and becomes Mordred's lover until he kills her; the main protagonist and narrator Morgaine (Morgan), portrayed similar as in the medieval romances but more sympathetically; and Nimue, a sympathetic and tragic young priestess who falls in love with the Merlin but is duty bound by Morgaine to seduce and lure him to his death – following which she drowns herself.
  - Their ancestors (the previous priestesses of Avalon and, before that, of Atlantis) are subjects of Bradley's extended Avalon universe novels, among them the direct prequel Lady of Avalon (1997), the third part of which follows the young Viviane as a child. The scene of Morgaine's and Nimue's journey to Avalon was also reworked by Bradley into the short story "The Pledged World" (in The Merlin Chronicles, 1995).
  - Nimue's portrayal in The Mists was expanded on in Karen Haber's short story "The Spell Between Worlds" and Elisabeth Waters' short story "Trees of Avalon" (Return to Avalon, 1996).
  - A 2001 television adaptation of The Mists of Avalon starred Anjelica Huston as Viviane, and Julianna Margulies and Tamsin Egerton as Morgaine.
- Esther M. Friesner wrote multiple short stories featuring the Lady of the Lake, including 1985's "The Death of Nimuë" and the Arthur's death parodies "Wake-up Call" (1988), where Vivian and the Lady are separate characters, and "Totally Camelot" (1998). Her 1993 short story "The Three Queens" has Vivian as the Queen of the Fey who repeats Merlin's earlier willing human sacrifice with his disciple, Morgan's son, volunteering to be thrown into water in a hollow tree trunk in a ritual while Arthur is dying. In "Goldie, Lox, and the Three Excalibearers" (1996), a 1950s New York girl is persuaded by Merlin and Morgan to become a new Lady of the Lake.
- Jane Yolen's 1985 short story "Dream Reader" features the bard named Viviane and the mage Ambrosius that Merlin meets as a young boy. The story was then "significantly expanded, refocused, and changed" into the 1996 novel Hobby, a part of Yolen's The Young Merlin Trilogy, where Viviane is an assistant to Ambrosius.
  - Yolen's unrelated poem "In the Whitethorn Wood" (1995) is a conversation by Nimue with Merlin trapped in the tree.
- Martin Levin's short story "Merlin the Magician" (1985) has him imprisoned by the Ladies of the Lake under the rock until he escapes, and promptly returns, in the 20th century.
- In Carl Sherrell's novel Skraelings (1987), Vivian is the lover of the protagonist, the demon Raum, who tries to rescue her.
- Joan LaBombard's poem "The Magician" (in King Arthur and his Knights, 1987) has a stage magician realise he is Merlin and remembrer how he was trapped by Niniane.
  - The same anthology also contains John Grey's poem "My Lady of the Lake".
- In his Christian-themed 1987–1999 book series The Pendragon Cycle, Stephen Lawhead takes up the figure of the Lady of the Lake under a different name: the Faery princess Charis, daughter of Avallach, the king of Atlantis and later of Avalon. Married to the Breton prince Taliesin, she gives birth to Merlin. After Taliesin's death, Charis takes care of Merlin at Lake Logres, hence her title of the Lady of the Lake. She is the protagonist and narrator of the first book in the cycle, Taliesin. The traditional figure of Nimue belongs to Charis' shapeshifting evil sister Morgian (Morgan), the main antagonist through the entire series, including the modern-day Avalon: The Return of King Arthur.
  - Charis is portrayed by Rose Reid in the 2026 television adaptation The Pendragon Cycle: Rise of the Merlin.
- Nimue appears in James R. Berry's Magicians of Erianne (1988).
- In Peter David's Knight Life (1982), a satirical novel set in a contemporary New York, the Lady of the Lake appears in Central Park to give Excalibur to Arthur. In this version, Merlin's (abortive) imprisonment was the work of the evil Morgan.
- Madelaine E. Robins' short story "Nimuë's Tale" (in Invitation to Camelot, 1988) is narrated by her as "she remembers her (accidental) burial of Merlin, and her dismissal by the Lady of the Lake. When Pelleas returns to Broceliande with the Lady, Nimuë must recognize the Lady's real powers, and use her own."
- Fiona Patton's short story "The Raven's Quest" (in Camelot Fantastic, 1988) features Merlin's raven companion Corvus changed by Nimue into a human after she trapped Merlin in a hawthorn tree.
- In Michael Graetrex Coney's Fang, the Gnome (1988), and its sequel, King of the Scepter'd Isle (1989), Nimue and Merlin tell the legend of Arthur, "with grand romantic overtones in Nimue's stories and with comic results in the 'real' world."
- A British princess named after Niniane is one of the main characters in Joan Wolf's 1989 novel Born of the Sun, set generations after Arthur's reign.
- Ann K. Schwader's 1989 poem "She of the Lake" narrated by one of the "Three Queens of Faerie" bringing Arthur to Avalon.
- In Valerie Nieman Colander's poem "The Naming of the Lost" (King Arthur and his Knights II, 1989), Nimue and Merlin ('Merle') meet again and reconcile in modern America after she had once trapped him in a cave.
- Phyllis Ann Karr's "The Truth about the Lady of the Lake" (1990), a crossover short story featuring her characters Frostflower and Thorn in the Arthurian world.
  - Nimue is one of the main characters in Karr's "The Realm of the Dead and the Dreaming" (in The Doom of Camelot, 2000), helping Morgan and Merlin to prepare Arthur's arrival to Avalon.
- In James Sale's 1990 poem "Nimue", she eventually realises with a regret that only Merlin could have saved Arthur's kingdom.
- Rob MacGregor's Indiana Jones novel Indiana Jones and the Dance of the Giants (1991) features excavations at Ninian's Cave in Scotland as a plot device in the story about the legacy of Merlin.
- In Molly Cochran and Warren Murphy's novel The Forever King (1992), Nimue is an important character in the novel's flashback parts.
- Fay Sampson's novel Daughter of Tintagel (1992) has Arthur raised by Merlin and Nimue in her valley.
- Nora Roberts' 1992 novel Entranced has its protagonist Sebastian Donovan being a descendant of Ninian as well as of Morgan le Fay.
- In "The Dark Tower", a 1996 poem by Genevieve Stephens, the eponymous tower is the one where Vivian imprisons Merlin.
- Michael Morpurgo's Arthur, High King of Britain (1994) has the young Arthur Pendragon as guarded in a cave by the Lady of the Lake.
- Robert Holdstock's 1994 novel Merlin's Wood, inspired by Tennyson, has "the spirits of Merlin and Vivian re-enact, in a twentieth-century family, their desperate struggle for power; the setting is the wood of Broceliande."
- In T. A. Barron's novel The Merlin Effect (1994), a young modern girl Kate helps Merlion battling Nimue, a wicked sea witch who had imprisoned him.
  - In Barron's novel series The Lost Years of Merlin, Vivian also known as Nimue is also featured as an enemy of Merlin, here plotting to steal his magic, including in The Seven Songs (1997) and The Mirror of Merlin (1999).
- John Masefield's poem "All Hallow Night" (pub. 1994) has Arthur receiving the sword from the Lady of the Lake on the promise to visit her each All Hallow night.
- In Bernard Cornwell's 1995–1997 novel series The Warlord Chronicles, more historically grounded and realistic than usual treatments of Arthurian legend, Nimue is an Irish orphan adopted by the British druid Merlin. She is a prominent character in the books, being a childhood friend of, a major love interest for, and finally an adversary to the series' main protagonist, Arthur's warrior Derfel Cadarn. She begins as Merlin's most adept priestess and lover, but as she grows ever more brutal and fanatical, by the time of the final novel she turns against him and imprisons him, torturing him to reveal the last of his magical secrets in her desperate obsession to bring back the Old Gods of Britain at any price. Eventually, she brings Merlin to total madness before ultimately sacrificing him to their lost gods, whose return she believes would rid the island of the Saxons and the Christians alike. As Nimue believes the key to her goal is to sacrifice Gwydre, Arthur's son with Guinevere using Excalibur (as she already did with Gawain), Derfel's final act of casting the sword away is not to return it to her but to hide it from her forever. Stephen Thomas Knight, commenting on Cornwell's vicious Nimue, with her tunnel-vision ruthlessness, vindicativeness, and frequent use of prolonged torture, opined the "pro-Celtic quasi-historian" author "links her to the Saxons as part of her hostility to decent people, including Merlin." Symbolically, both Nimue and the hypocritical Bishop Sansum, representing the Christian side of the books' major theme of the danger of religious extremism, remain still alive as the story comes to the end.
  - Cornwell's Nimue was portrayed by Ellie James in the 2022 television series The Winter King. The adaptation changed her character (and others) considerably. The series depicts Nimue as an orphaned young girl taken in by the wizard Merlin. Her power is deeply connected to water.
- Niviene, also known as Vivian, is the protagonist and narrator of Anne Eliot Crompton's novel Merlin's Harp (1995). Here she is a Fey, living with her mother the Lady of the Lake, her brother Lugh, and Merlin in Avalon. After crossing over to the human world, Niviene seduces Arthur, gives bith to his son, saves Arthur from Morgan, and eventually takes Arthur to Avalon after his battle with their son. She also appears in Percival's Angel (1999). Crompton's short story "Excalibur" (in Camelot, 1995) is narrated by an unnamed Fey girl who saves the young Arthur, meets the Lady of the Lake, and is told she will become the next Lady.
- Jessica Amanda Salmonson's short story "Namer of Beasts, Maker of Souls: The Romance of Sylvester and Nimuë" (in The Merlin Chronicles, 1995), using Merlin's alternative name.
- Robert J. Stewart's short story "Merlin and Nimuë" (in Merlin Through the Ages, 1995) has Merlin choosing to be imprisoned by her so Arthur can be healed.
- Gary Gygax's short story "Duty" (in Excalibur, 1995) has Vivian as the creator of Excalibur as Merlin's "desire for her is also a desire to appropriate her magic and the sword."
  - Also in Excalibur, "Passing" by Charles de Lint has a reporter meet a Lady of the Lake who seeks to free herself from Excalibur so she can remain human.
  - In the same anthology, the central image of Daniel H. Scheltema's "Hope's Edge" is the Lady's hand holding Excalibur.
  - In another Excalibur story, "Troubled Waters" by Susan Shwartz, set after Camlann, the Lady of the Lake travels to Avalon to take revenge on Arthur, where she and Morgan "meet and duel over Excalibur and their visions of the realm."
- The Witcher series features Nimue verch Wledyr ap Gwyn, or the "Lady of the Lake", a human sorceress from the future, introduced in Baptism of Fire (1996) and returning in The Lady of the Lake (1999) and Season of Storms (2013). She helps the protagonist Ciri navigate time and space from her and the Fisher King's castle on a lake island to ensure the legend of Ciri is completed.
  - A historian named Nimue was portrayed by Eve Ridley (child) and Sha Dessi (adult) in the Netflix adaptation.
  - An entirely different Lady of the Lake appears in the 2007 video game The Witcher and in the 2016 The Witcher 3: Wild Hunt expansion Blood and Wine as a mysterious nymph-like figure in a strongly Arthurian-inspired local setting. She is worshipped as goddess by both humans and monsters, with servants including the Fisher King, and twice bestows the sword Aerondight to the protagonist Geralt of Rivia when he agrees to become a knight in her service and proves to be worthy through a series of quests. In the first game, she can also be romanced by Geralt.
- Vivian is one of daughters of Merlin and Ninian in Quinn Taylor Evans' novel series Merlin's Legacy. She is the protagonist of Daughter of Fire (1996).
- Eleanor Arnason's 1996 "The Dog's Story" ends with Nimue's entrapment of Merlin under a rock despite the suspicion of his companion, a rapist turned by Merlin into a dog.
- R. T. Smith's "The Uses of Enchantment" (1996) is a poem that "imagines Merlin as an oak tree, trying to speak of Vivien's cruelty and her beauty."
- In Alan Bown's Sword and Sorcery (1997), the "loss and recovery (through the aid of the Lady of the Lake) of the sword Excalibur is central to the plot."
- John T. Aquino's short story "A Figure in Faerie Time" (in The Chronicles of Round Table, 1997) presents they story of Gawain and Ettare as repeating throughout the history, with Nimue and Pelleas also repeating their roles.
- Nigel Bennett and P. N. Elrod's Keeper of the King (1997) features the vampires Richard (former Lancelot) and Sabra the Lady of the Lake as main characters on a Grail quest in the 1990s.
- Karen Vincent's poem "The Keeper" (1998) describes the Lady sleeping in the lake besides Excalibur.
- In Nancy Springer's I am Mordred: A Tale from Camelot (1998), "Nyneve, who imprisoned Merlin, is a major character, the only one who truly believes that Mordred might escape his doom."
- Victoria Alexander's Believe (1998) is a time travel novel featuring Vivian as a major character.
- In Lisanne Norman's short story "The Wild Hunt" (in Merlin, 1999), Nimue guides a line of Merlin's successors throughout the history and into the future.
  - Also in Merlin, Lyn McConchie's "Other Agendas" tell of how Nimuë "attempts to acquire Merlin's magic and power but runs into unexpected difficulties."
  - Another story, "Merlin and Vivian" by Alan Rodgers, tells of "the beginning of the love of Merlin for Viviane who is a powerful Fairy Queen" (but not yet known as the Lady of the Lake).
- Irene Radford's series Merlin's Descendants has the evil Nimue and the good Lady of the Lake as separate characters. Nimue and Morgaine are the villains of Guardian of Balance (1999), as is Nimue's 16th-century female descendant in Guardian of the Vision (2001). Conversely, the Lady of the Lake is a good character who gives Excalibur to the protagonist of Guardian of the Trust (2000).
- There are multiple Ladies of the Lake in Diana L. Paxson's 1999 novel series The Hallowed Isle. In The Book of the Sword, the Lady of the Lake (a cousin of Merlin's mother) is the mother of Arthur and Morgause's mother, Igierne, who in turn becomes a Lady later. In The Book of the Cauldron, Morgause steals her mother's magic cauldron from the Island of Maidens.

==== Since 2000 ====
- David Solvay's 2000 poem "Merlin on Nyneve" has Merlin trapped in stone and reflecting on her and himself.
- In C. A. Gardner's short story "Three Queens Weeping" (in The Doom of Camelot, 2000), Nimue is one of the eponymous queens trying, and failing, to save the dying Arthur.
- Nimue is one of the protagonists in Mary Hoffman's 2000 short story collection Women of Camelot: Queens and Enchantresses at the Court of King Arthur.

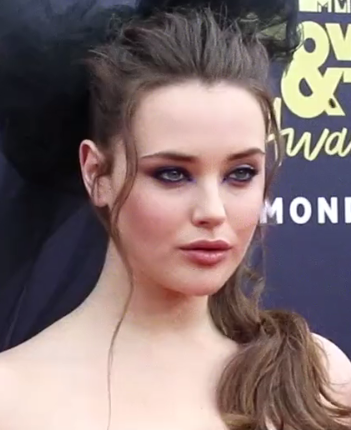
A 2018 photo of Katherine Langford who played the protagonist Nimue in the 2020 Netflix series Cursed

- In the 2020 television series Cursed, a feminist re-imagining of the Arthurian legend based on a 2019 illustrated novel of the same title, Nimue is the protagonist, portrayed by Katherine Langford in the adaptation. Writer and showrunner Tom Wheeler said he was inspired by "this really evocative image of this young woman's hand reaching out of this lake and offering the sword to Arthur, so that image is what captivated us. And it's a really mysterious, magical, sad image, and it begged all of these questions: Why is she giving the sword to Arthur? What was their relationship? Why him? Why does she have the sword?" (Contrary to Wheeler's stated belief, it is not Nimue who gives the sword in Malory's unrevised telling.) In Cursed, before becoming the Lady of the Lake, Nimue, also known as the "Wolf-Blood Witch", is a young woman coming into her Fey abilities, but whilst her home was ravaged by the Christian fanatics called the Red Paladins she is sent on a mission by her dying mother to deliver "The Sword of Power" (Excalibur but never named) to Merlin. Taking great liberties from the source materials, Cursed's Lancelot (known until the finale as only "The Weeping Monk") is already adult when Nimue first meets him and is for most part just one of her enemies, Merlin is revealed to be her father, and she is instead Arthur's love interest. The story of Cursed ends abruptly when Nimue is shot with arrows by a nun named Iris (an original character with no counterpart in the legend) and falls into a body of water, where she (or her spirit, as her exact fate is left unexplained) will guard the sword until "a true king rises to claim it." Albeit the TV series adapted the entire original book, it was supposed to continue in the canceled second season.
- In 2025, Jean Menzies wrote a sapphic adaptation of this folklore in her novel The Lady in the Lake. The story starts off with the main character Lady Viviane planning to win the hand of Arthur, but steers off in a romantic twist with his sister, Morgan Le Fay, in a friends-to-lovers slow burn romance.

=== Other media ===
==== Early ====
- Ben Jonson's 1610 masque The Speeches at Prince Henry's Barriers, featuring Lady of the Lake, Arthur and Merlin as the speakers.
- John Thelwall's 1801 drama The Fairy of the Lake: A Dramatic Romance in which she "intervenes at crucial moments to rescue Arthur and Guenever from Rowena's schemes."
- An often reprinted music score "The Lady of the Lake" from Arthur Sullivan's masque Kenilworth (1864).
- In Edgar Fawcett's comedy The New King Arthur: An Opera without Music (1885), Vivien plots with Mordred to steal Excalibur.
- Pearl Eytinge's Vivien: A Play (1891).
- In Rochard Hovey's 1895 The Marriage of Guenevere: A Tragedy, Nimue (aiding Taliesin on his journey) and the Lady of the Lake are separate characters.
- Graham Hill's Guinevere: A Tragedy (1906) has Vivian plotting to overthrow Arthur with her husband Mordred and his brother Agravain.
- In Ethel Watts Mumford's Merlin and Vivien: A Lyric Drama (1907), Vivien is a servant of Morgan on a mission to get rid of Merlin. Using a magic ring, she enchants Merlin to leave Arthur's court and magically create the castle Joyousguard, where Vivien learns his magic and uses it against him.
- In Ralph Adams Cram's 1909 Excalibur: An Arthurian Drama, Nimue is a handmaid to Morgan who attempts to seduce Merlin "but he throws her off the battlements".
- Floyd Dell's 1916 play is set in the contemporary Camelot, Maine, where Vivien is an artist.
- In James Branch Cabell's 1927 play Something about Eve, Merlin "recounts his affair with Nimue (here a daughter of Diana), [how] she tempted him away from the world of men, and the way he eventually tires of her and escapes."
- Billy Mayerl composed the piano music track "Lady of the Lake" in his printed music impression The Legends of King Arthur (1929). It was released in the album Marigold in 1989, performed by Eric Parkin.
- In E. S. Padmore's 1936 play The Death of Arthur, The Story of the Holy Grail, Vivien is the Grail maiden and Merlin is conflated with Mark.
- Fleming A. MacLeish's radio drama The Destroyers (1942), set in the post-Roman Britain, has Vivian reveal that Medrawt (Mordred) is the son of Arthur and Anna (Morgause).
- In James Birdie's 1944 play Lancelot, Nimue and Merlin are behind magically tricking Lancelot into marrying Elaine and fathering Galahad.

==== Since 1950—2000 ====
- J. C. Trewin's play A Sword for a Prince, first performed in 1954, where the Lady of the Lake dwells in Cornwall.
- The 1960 musical Camelot includes the character Nimue who has a song called "Follow Me" performed in Act I. In the play, Nimue, a beautiful water nymph, has come to draw Merlyn into her cave for an eternal sleep. He begs Nimue for answers, as he has forgotten if he has warned Arthur about Lancelot and Mordred, before his memories fade permanently and he is led away.
  - She does not appear in the 1967 film adaptation, but "Follow Me" is echoed in the notably similar "Come with Me" sung by the Lady of the Lake for Galahad in the later parody musical Spamalot (2005).
- The Lady of the Lake is satirized off-screen in the 1975 comedy film Monty Python and the Holy Grail, in which late 20th century notions are inserted into a mythic tale for comical effect. In a famous scene, a peasant named Dennis says, "Strange women lying in ponds distributing swords is no basis for a system of government. Supreme executive power derives from a mandate from the masses, not from some farcical aquatic ceremony." Arthurian scholar N. J. Higham described this iconic dialogue line as ever "immortal" in 2005.
- "Lady of the Lake", a song in Rick Wakeman's 1975 'rock opera' The Myths and Legends of King Arthur and the Knights of the Round Table.
- Starcastle's song "Lady of the Lake" in their album Starcastle (1976).
- In the DC Comics Universe, Vivienne is the Lady of the Lake. Nimue is the good Madame Xanadu (introduced in 1978), her youngest sister, and their middle sister is the evil Morgaine le Fey (given name Morgana); their surname is Inwudu. The Lady of the Lake has appeared in Hellblazer, Aquaman, and her sister's own series.
  - In the 1983 DC Comics series Camelot 3000, an unrelated Lady of the Lake is referred to as Nyneve, depicted as a woman with a beautiful body but wearing a mask, who is sent to confront the heroes of Camelot. When Nyneve removes the mask, Merlin, upon seeing her face, is unable to resist her and departs, thus removing him from Morgan's path. Later, when he escapes her control, it is revealed that her only facial feature is a gigantic mouth with a long serpentine tongue, vagina dentata style, which Merlin turns against her.
- In John Boorman's 1981 film Excalibur, an uncredited actress plays the Lady of Lake, twice holding up the fabled sword, once for Merlin to give to Uther Pendragon, and once to return to Arthur. Separately, the film's Morgana (Helen Mirren) takes on other parts of the traditional Lady of the Lake story, learning the occult arts from Merlin and ultimately trapping him with his own powerful "Charm of Making", the magic of shapeshifting.
- Kayak's song "Niniane (Lady of the Lake)" in their 1981 album Merlin.
- Featured in the 1985 episode "Exalibur" of the animated series ThunderCats.
- In the 1985-1986 comic book series Mage: The Hero Discovered, "Edsel, a young woman, acts as the Lady of the Lake" for the protagonist Kevin Matchstick (Arthur).
- The role-playing game Pendragon (first published in 1985 and repeatedly revised since then), the Ladies of the Lake are a magic-wielding sisterhood of pagan priestesses and enchantresses with an unknown agenda that live apart from humanity. They include the distinctive figures of Nineve, Nimue, and Viviane.
- Thierry Fervant's song "The Lady of the Lake" in his 1988 album Legends of Avalon.
- She appears as Arthur's court enchantress Nineve in the 1990 game Spirit of Excalibur in which she functions a powerful druidic magic user helping Lord Constantine unite Britain following the death of King Arthur, and ultimately to find and destroy Morgan le Fay. In the 1991 sequel, Vengeance of Excalibur, the player needs to rescue Nineve from being abducted by the demon Shadowmaster.
- The Lady of the Lake, transformed into the Ice Maiden, appears in the 1990 video game Conquests of Camelot: The Search for the Grail where she holds Sir Launcelot captive in ice because he spurned her love for Queen Gwenhyver. After King Arthur get through the dangerous frozen lake to return her stolen Crystal Heart, she provides him with information about the Grail's location and challenges him to a test to free Launcelot.
- Medwyn Goodall's song "Lady of the Lake" in his 1990 album Merlin.
- Forrest M. Byrd's Merlin and Vivien: A One-Act Play (1990) is an inspired story set in 1968 Houston, featuring the characters of Vivien Partin and Merlin Jenkins.
- An inspired character appears as a spirit of the Round Table known as the Lady of the Table (Kathleen Barr) in the 1992-1993 animated series King Arthur and the Knights of Justice.
- The Lady of the Lake assists the eponymous protagonist of the 1993 video game Young Merlin.
- Ad Dios' song "Lady of the Lake" in their 1994 album Avalon.

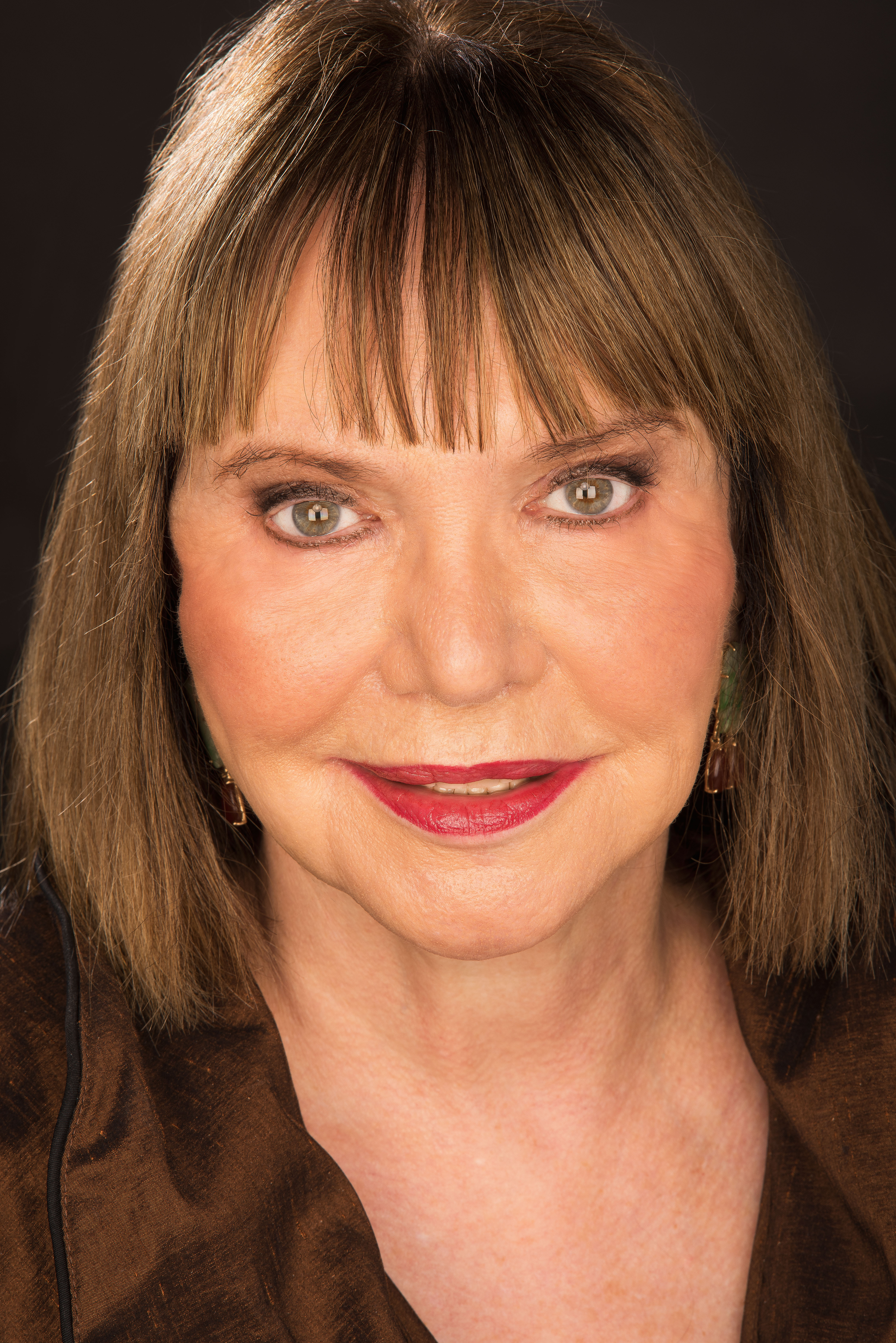
Corinne Orr voiced the antagonist Lady Kale in Princess Gwenevere and the Jewel Riders

- In the 1995–1996 animated series Princess Gwenevere and the Jewel Riders, the name of the first season's antagonist Lady Kale (voiced by Corinne Orr), an evil twin sister of the queen of Avalon and a former student of Merlin who imprisons him in the magic trees portal to another dimension for him to perish there, was created as an anagram of Lady of the Lake. Lady Kale, or Princess Kale, seeks to steal all of Merlin's magic so she can rule Avalon forever, later working together with the new main villain Queen Morgana in the show's second season. Nevertheless, a good character of the Lady of the Lake herself briefly appears during the series' finale in the eponymous episode, "Lady of the Lake", where a hand emerging from the water, Excalibur-scene style, gives the magic Staff of Avalon to the series' protagonist, Princess Gwenevere (daughter of Kale's good sister, Queen Anya), so she can defeat Kale and Morgana and save Merlin and Avalon. (Her character was renamed as the Spirit of Avalon in the version Starla and the Jewel Riders, where the episode is accordingly retitled "Spirit of Avalon".)
- The 1996 episode "Pendragon" in the animated series Gargoyles features Arthur, the Lady of the Lake, and Excalibur.
- Introduced to the Warhammer franchise in 1996, the Lady of the Lake is the primary goddess of the Arthurian-inspired human realm of Bretonnia in the Warhammer Fantasy setting, serving as the patron of chivalry and the source of power for Grail Knights and Damsels. She acts through a mortal vessel known as the Fay Enchantress, Morgiana le Fay, who acts as the supreme political and spiritual authority in Bretonnia. Her secret true identity is that of the elven goddess of moon, dreams, prophecy and fortune, Lileath (known to the wood elves as Ladrielle, the Lady of Mists), who created Bretonnia to act as a shield against the forces of Chaos. She is also featured in the Total War: Warhammer series of video games.
- Jana Runnalls' music album Lady of the Lake (1997).
- Lisa Thiel's song "Lady of the Lake" in her album Lady of the Lake (1997).
- As Vivian (ヴィヴィアン) she has appeared in many installments of the Shin Megami Tensei / Persona video game franchise since her introduction in 1997's Devil Summoner: Soul Hackers. Her profile in Devil Survivor 2 describes her as "A beautiful faerie of Arthurian lore. She guarded Lancelot, a knight of the Round Table. She lives with many knights and servants beneath an illusory lake in France, and is known as the 'Lady of the Lake'. She gave Excalibur to Arthur."
- The Lady of the Lake appars in the 1998 video game King's Quest: Mask of Eternity to award the Sword of the Lake to the protagonist Connor.
- In the 1998 television miniseries Merlin, the characters of the Lady of the Lake (Miranda Richardson) and Nimue (Isabella Rossellini) are separated, with the former being a goddess-like beneficent fae who is the twin sister of the evil Queen Mab, and the latter being a noblewoman damsel in distress with no supernatural powers who is the object of Merlin's affections (here mutual). In the motif evoking Edwin Arlington Robinson's 1917 poem Merlin, Nimue and Merlin live together in another world until he leaves in order to help Arthur. In the end, however, Merlin returns to her and makes them both young again with the last of his magic.
  - The story was novelized in James Mallory's series Merlin (1999–2000), ending with their reunion after the death of Arthur.
  - In the 2006 pseudo-sequel Merlin's Apprentice, Miranda Richardson reprises her role as the Lady of the Lake, as the only returning cast member aside of Merlin's Sam Neill, though she portrays a much different characterization: the Lady is the main antagonist seeking to destroy Camelot. It also depicts Merlin's sleep in the cave; as he slept, the Lady used her magic to conceive a son with Merlin and then enchanted him to sleep for 50 years.
- Heather Dale tells the story of Merlin and Vivian in the song "Hawthorn Tree" from her 1999 album The Trial of Lancelot.

==== Since 2000 ====
- Metal band Grave Digger tells the story of Merlin and Nimue in the song "The Spell" from their 2000 album Exalibur.
- Nimue the sorceress is a playable character in the 2002 video game Legion: The Legend of Excalibur.
- The renegade Circle of Wizards member Nimue (Wizard of Water) is featured as Merlin's cruel enemy in the video game Age of Wonders II: The Wizard's Throne. Depicted as mad "siren goddess", constantly drowning her own creations, she also appears as an enemy and (after defeating her) playable ruler in Age of Wonders 4 (2023).
- In the Fate franchise, introduced in 2004, the Lady of the Lake is a complex character known as Vivian (ヴィヴィアン), also known as Nimue (ニミュエ), who is also Morgan le Fay (モルガン・ル・フェイ). They are alternative aspects of the same entity, Morgan, who developed these personas to reconcile the conflicting roles of a human queen, a fairy, and the avatar of Britain's mysteries. The so-called Pan-Human History (PHH) Morgan is a complex character who split her personality to manage her conflicting roles: Artoria's (female Arthur, also known as Saber) caring older sister (Morgan), an evil witch scheming against Artoria (Morgan le Fay, voiced by Aya Endō in the anime Fate/Apocrypha), and the fairy of the lake aiding Artoria (Vivian/Nimue). As Morgan, she is the mother of Gawain, Agravain, and Gaheris; as Morgan le Fay, she is supernatural mother of the female Mordred; as Vivian, she is Lancelot's foster-mother.
  - In 2021, the video game Fate/Grand Order further introduced an almost completely distinct and singular character of the so-called Lostbelt 6 (LB6) Morgan, the queen of the fairy Britain with the knowledge of the PHH Morgan's memories, also known as Aesc or Toneriko (トネリコ) and voiced by Yui Ishikawa.
- In the 2005–2009 television series Kaamelott, the Lady of the Lake (Audrey Fleurot) is an angel sent to help King Arthur progress in the quest for the Grail. Upending the established connections, the series' Lancelot not only never interacts with the Lady but cannot even see her.

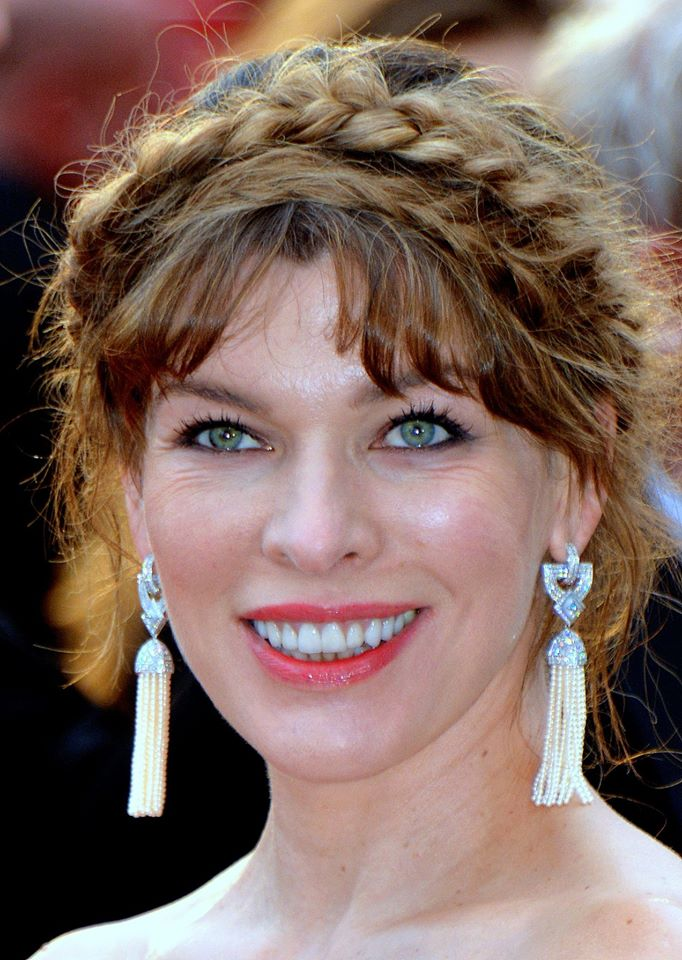
A 2019 photo of Milla Jovovich who played the antagonist Nimue in the 2019 film Hellboy

- Nimue, the Blood Queen, appears as one of the primary antagonists in the Hellboy comic book series by Mike Mignola, influenced by the classic comics series Prince Valiant. Here she was introduced in 2008 as a witch who was driven mad after the powers she acquired from Merlin, gave her knowledge of the Ogdru Jahad, prompting the witches of Britain to dismember her and seal her away underground. Resurrected in the present day by Arthur's last descendant, Hellboy, she assumes the mantle of the Irish triple war goddess the Morrígan and assembles an army of legendary and folkloric beings to eradicate mankind, only to stopped by Hellboy at the cost of his own life. Although having been turned into an evil creature trying to destroy the word, Nimue still had a human part "that hated and feared what she had become."
  - She is portrayed by Milla Jovovich as the main antagonist in the 2019 film adaptation Hellboy. Just when massing a plague throughout London, Nimue was thwarted and dismembered by Arthur with his Excalibur before her pieces were separately concealed. After Gruagach recovered all her pieces, Nimue is resurrected for revenge and seeks Hellboy to create the apocalypse. Later in the climax, she betrays and kills Gruagach, and then Trevor to enrage Hellboy to pull Excalibur from Arthur's tomb and releases all demons throughout England. However, Alice Monaghan channels Trevor's spirit to encourage Hellboy, who decapitated Nimue, and send her and all demons back to Hell.

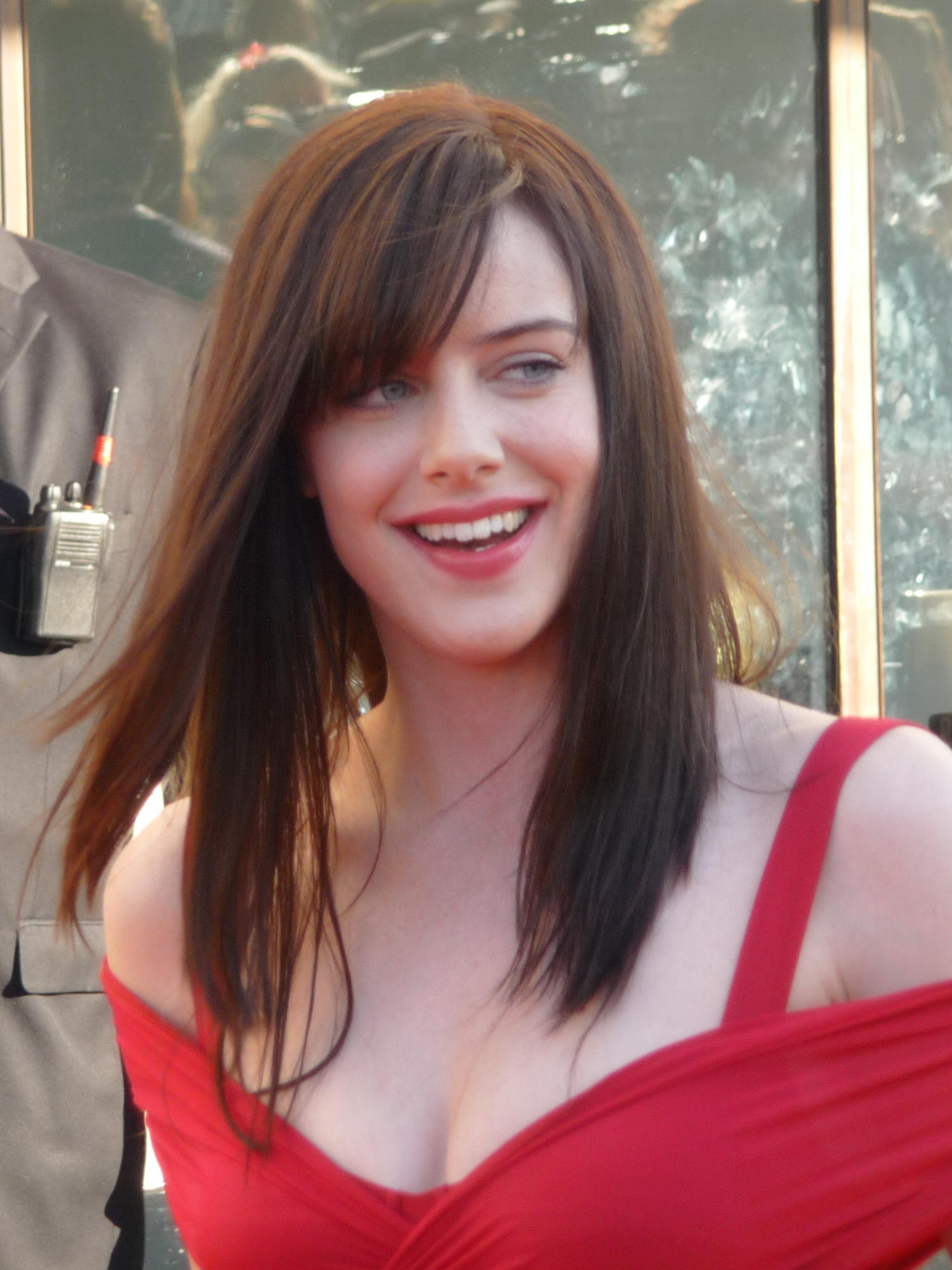
A 2009 photo of Michelle Ryan who played the antagonist Nimueh in the 2008 BBC series Merlin

- The 2008–2012 television series Merlin also features two characters based on the Lady of the Lake. Nimueh (Michelle Ryan) serves as the primary antagonist of the show's first season, which includes the episode titled "The Mark of Nimueh". The character has no connection to Merlin beyond his opposition to her plans, and her only connection to a lake is her use of a location called the Isle of the Blessed (Thomas Wentworth Higginson's 19th-century name for Avalon). She ends up killed by Merlin in a showdown on her Isle of Nimueh in the season's last episode, "Le Morte d'Arthur". The ninth episode of the second season is titled "The Lady of the Lake", wherein a sorceress named Freya (Laura Donnelly) dies and vows to repay Merlin for his kindness to her. In the third season finale, Freya, now a water spirit, returns Excalibur to Merlin so that he can give it to Prince Arthur Pendragon.
- In the video game Sonic and the Black Knight (2009), Nimue represents Amy Rose in an Arthurian setting. Voiced by Taeko Kawata and by Lisa Ortiz in English, the Lady of the Lake aids Sonic against King Arthur and the Dark Queen (Merlina the Wizard).
- Lady Nimue appears in the video games King Arthur: The Role-Playing Wargame (2009) and King Arthur II: The Role-Playing Wargame (2012), first as an ally and then as an enemy. The Lady of the Lake appears as a separate character, being also featured in King Arthur: Knight's Tale (2022) where she tasks the resurrected Mordred with the task of killing the now-evil undead Arthur corrupting Avalon.
- Nimue is featured in the 2010s television series Once Upon a Time in which Arthurian characters live in the land inhabited by other fairy tale characters. She appears as a secondary antagonist in the first half of Season 5, portrayed by Caroline Ford. She is introduced in the eponymous episode "Nimue" when, fleeing from Vortigan who sacked and burned her village, she meets Merlin and they fall in love; with Merlin being immortal, Nimue drinks from the Holy Grail so they can be together forever. Afterwards, she kills Vortigan, which darkens her magic and turns her into the very first Dark One. Nimue breaks Excalibur but Merlin cannot bring himself to kill her and ends up being trapped in a tree. At some point, Nimue dies but she manages to live on in all of the following Dark Ones, appearing to them as a vision. She forms an alliance with Captain Hook, manipulating him into casting the Dark Curse and reviving her and the Dark Ones, and then leads a Dark One invasion in Storybrooke, which ultimately leads to her demise at the hands of Hook, who betrays her to redeem himself and destroy her and the Dark Ones forever using Excalibur. The separate character of the Lady of the Lake is referenced as Lancelot's mother, but she never appears; even the episode titled "The Lady of the Lake" does not feature her and its title instead refers to Prince Charming's mother.
- In the video game Wizard101, she assists the player within the 2012 Avalon world expansion as a mermaid character of Nimue the Lady of the Lake.
- In the media franchise Million Arthur, Nimue is a character introduced in the video game Million Arthur: Arcana Blood (2014) and voiced by Shiori Izawa. She is a hybrid created by Merlin to serve as a human-faerie interpreter and then trained in magic by him, who also created her clones.
- The 2017 film King Arthur: Legend of the Sword features the Lady of the Lake (Jacqui Ainsley) binding Excalibur to the Pendragon bloodline after Merlin used it to destroy the Mage Tower and appears to catch the sword underwater after Arthur throws it into the lake in shame at his failures; she pulls Arthur underwater and motivates him to fight Vortigern before returning the sword to him. This good Lady of the Lake has her mirror image in the film's monstrous character "Syren" that replaces the two dragons in the film's revision of the legend of Vortigern's Tower.
- Nimue appears in the 2020 animated series Wizards: Tales of Arcadia, introduced in the episode "Lady of the Lake". She was a benelovent ancient goddess who had created Excalibur (voiced by Stephanie Beatriz), before Merlin trapped her in her lake, which made her turn into a giant monster (voiced by Kathleen Turner). She repairs Excalibur after having been freed by the heroes.
- The Lady of the Lake has appeared since 2020 in the manga and anime series The Seven Deadly Sins, as well as the video game The Seven Deadly Sins: Grand Cross, voiced by Sayaka Ohara and by Michelle Ruff in English. The separate and unrelated 7DS character of Vivian, voiced by Minako Kotobuki and Marieve Herington, had been originally introduced in the manga Four Knights of the Apocalypse in 2014.
- In the 2022 video game God of War Ragnarök, Nimue is briefly mentioned by Mimir during one of the game's many boat trips. He speaks fondly of her, stating that she is 'very good' with a sword, which Kratos interprets as a double entendre.
- In the 2023 video game King Arthur: Legends Rise, the playable character of Vivian is the queen of the Summer Forest fays. She had raised Lancelot, Lionel, and Bohort in her Lake Palace, and now supports King Arthur.
- Nimue appears prominently (including on the cover) in the 2023 video game Remnant 2 as a goddess-like fae aiding the player characters, voiced by Helen Kennedy.
- Nimue appears in the 2023 video game The Pathless as a snake-shaped water goddess corrupted by evil into a monster until the protagonist cleanses and restores Nimue back to her original form.
- The water fae deity Nimue is a supporting character against the undead Arthur in the 2025 video game SWORN.
- In the video game Ravenswatch, Merlin was added as a player character in 2026 with the mission to find the Lady of the Lake.
- In the upcoming video game Tides of Annihilation, Niniane is a shapeshifting fairy and the player's companion character that is to play a major part in the game's story.

The Lady of the Lake has been also featured in many mobile games, including AFK Arena, ALICE Fiction, Among Gods (as Morgan), Chrono Astrea (as Viviane), Devil Athena, Dragon Traveler, Epic Seven (as Vivian), Kingdom of Heroes (as Vivian), Lost Sword (as Vivien), Rebirth of Heroes (as Viviane), Stella Fantasy (as Nimue), Valkyrie Crusade, and Yggdrasil 2: Awakening (as Vivian).

== See also ==
- Grendel's mother
- Llyn y Fan Fach
- Yeshe Tsogyal
