= The Pendragon Cycle =

Book series by Stephen Lawhead

- Taliesin (1987); Merlin (1988); Arthur (1989); Pendragon (1994); Grail (1997); Avalon (1999); Aurelia (2025)
- Author: Stephen R. Lawhead
- Country: United States
- Language: English
- Genre: Historical fantasy
- Publisher: Baen Books (current edition)
- Published: 1987–1989, 1994-1999, 2025
- Media type: Literature
- No. of books: 7

The Pendragon Cycle is a seven-book historical fantasy series by Stephen R. Lawhead based on the Arthurian legends. The five-book main series reimagines the legends in a historical setting spanning the fourth through sixth centuries, combining legendary material with historical figures and places. Lawhead draws on sources including the Mabinogion, Geoffrey of Monmouth's History of the Kings of Britain, and writings by Taliesin, Gildas, and Nennius.

The series began with Taliesin (1987), Merlin (1988), and Arthur (1989), originally published as The Pendragon Trilogy. Lawhead later expanded it with Pendragon (1994) and Grail (1997), whose events occur within the chronology of Arthur. Avalon (1999) is a sequel set centuries later, while Aurelia (2025) is a prequel.

In November 2022, The Daily Wire announced a television adaptation for DailyWire+. The resulting seven-episode series, The Pendragon Cycle: Rise of the Merlin, premiered in January 2026.

== Overview ==
The series is a work of fiction that takes place in the fourth, fifth, and sixth centuries and attempts to present the Arthurian legends in a historical setting while presenting the story with a reality the reader can connect with. Lawhead bases his stories on the Mabinogion, the History of the Kings of Britain and other works of Geoffrey of Monmouth, the writings of Taliesin, Gildas, and Nennius, and several other legends that he interweaves into the Arthurian legend.

The books, with the exception of Taliesin and Avalon, are narrated in the first-person, and, except for Pendragon, Grail, and Avalon, are each split into three sections (Pendragon has four, Grail one, and Avalon five). Merlin and Pendragon are narrated by Myrddin (Merlin). The first third of Arthur is narrated by Pelleas, the second by Bedwyr (Bedivere), and the third by Aneirin/Gildas. Grail is mostly narrated by Gwalchavad (Galahad), with a short narration by Morgian (Morgan le Fay) at the beginning of most chapters. Taliesin follows Taliesin and Charis (the Lady of the Lake), alternating in each chapter; Avalon mostly follows James Stuart (the reborn Arthur), Merlin, and the fictional Prime Minister Thomas Waring.

== Novels ==
=== Prequel ===
- Aurelia (2025)

=== Main series ===
1. Taliesin (1987)
2. Merlin (1988)
3. Arthur (1989)
4. Pendragon (1994)
5. Grail (1997)

=== Sequel ===
- Avalon (1999; AKA Avalon: The Return of King Arthur)

== Plot overview ==
=== Taliesin ===
The novel tells of the fall of Atlantis, the subsequent travel of Princess Charis and her family to Ynys Prydein (Britain), and the discovery and training of Taliesin as a druid/bard. The two meet and marry, and Myrddin (Merlin) is born just weeks before a tragedy brought about by Charis' jealous half-sister, Morgian.

=== Merlin ===
Myrddin serves as narrator. This volume relates Myrddin's dual upbringing among the druids and Christian priests, his capture and mystical training among the Hill Folk, and his brief time as a king of Dyfed. He experiences a doomed romance with Princess Ganieda and long years of madness as a wild man of the woods before finding his destiny, helping the brothers Aurelius and Uther in turn become the High King of Britain, ultimately leading to the birth of Arthur.

=== Arthur ===
This volume is narrated by Pelleas, Bedwyr, and Aneirin, respectively, relating Arthur and Myrddin's attempt to create the paradisaical "Kingdom of Summer". Arthur is made Duke and Battle chief of Britain after drawing his father's sword from a stone. He is obliged to fight Saecsens and other barbarian invaders to unite the peoples of Britain before his people accept him as High King.

=== Pendragon ===
This volume is narrated by Myrddin and tells of an invasion of Ireland and Britain by the Vandal army of Twrch Trwyth ("the Black Boar") and a subsequent plague that sweeps across Britain, threatening Arthur's still-new Kingdom of Summer.

=== Grail ===
A volume narrated by Gwalchavad and secondarily by Morgian. Arthur builds a shrine to house the Holy Grail and how Morgaws joins his court. When treachery follows, Arthur's warriors brave the Wasteland of Lyonesse to retrieve the sacred relic.

=== Avalon: The Return of King Arthur ===
In Portugal, the reprobate King Edward the Ninth has died by his own hand. British monarchy is in peril In the Scottish Highlands, Mr. Embries (Merlin) informs young captain, James Arthur Stuart, that he is not the commoner he thought himself, but Arthur returned. Enemies wait in ambush.

=== Aurelia ===
This volume is narrated by the hitherto unseen mother of Aurelius and Uther. She relates her life story to Myrddin of events during Merlin.

== Characters ==
Many historical characters (some already included in the Arthurian legend) exist in the cycle, alongside fictional characters: Taliesin, Magnus Maximus, Theodosius, Ambrosius Aurelianus, Vortigern, Constantine III, Myrddin Wyllt, Clovis I, Gwyddno Garanhir, Elffin ap Gwyddno, Horsa, Hengest, Cerdic, Aelle, Gildas, and Aneirin (in the series, it is revealed that the last two are the same person; he is born with the name Aneirin, but changes it to Gildas after Arthur's death).

Series character	Historical and legendary originals
Aneirin	Gildas
Arthur/Artos/Artorius ap Aurelius	King Arthur
Avallach	Fisher King/Avalloc
Aurelius	Ambrosius Aurelianus
Bedwyr	Bedivere
Cai/Caius	Kay
Caledvwlch/Caliburnus	Excalibur
Charis	Lady of the Lake
Cymbrogi i.e. "Companions"	Knights of the Round Table
Cymry	Welsh
Dafyd	St.David of Wales
Ector/Ectorius	Sir Hector
Fergus mac Guillomar	Leondegrance/Fergus mor
Gereint	Gareth
Ganieda (Merlin's wife)	Ganieda (Merlin's sister in Welsh legend)
Gorlas	Gorlois
Gwalchavad	Galahad
Gwalcmai	Gawain
Gwenhwyvar	Guinevere
"Joseph's Thorn"	Holy Thorn
Llwch Llenlleawg/Llencelyn	Lancelot
Macsen Wledig	Magnus Maximus
Medraut	Mordred/Mapon
Morgaws	Morgause/Guinevere
Morgian	Morgan le Fay/Nimue/Modron
Myrddin	Merlin
Ogryvan	Agravaine
Paulinus/Paulus	St. Paulinus of York
Rhys	Sir Robin
Saecsens	Saxons
"Sea Wolves"	Scotti
Urien Rheged	Urien
Ygerna	Igraine

== Locations ==
A listing of the locations and place names used in the series, and their modern equivalents (see also List of Roman place names in Britain):

Series name	Modern name
Afon Treont	River Trent
Albion	England
Armorica	Brittany
Avallon	Isle of Man/Avalon
Ynys Avallach	Glastonbury Tor/Annwn/Avalon
Baedun	Mons Badonicus
Britannia	Great Britain
Caer Alclyd	Glasgow
Caer Dyvi	Aberdyfi (Wales)
Celyddon	Caledonia (Scotland)
Connacht	Connacht
Cymry	Wales
Dal Riata	Dál Riata
Danum	Doncaster
Deva	Chester
Dumnonia	Cornwall
Eboracum	York
Caer Edyn	Edinburgh
Edyn Rock	Arthur's Seat
Ffreincland	France
Gaul	France
Glevum/Caer Gloiu	Gloucester
Guaul	Antonine Wall
Ierne/Eirinn	Ireland
Caer Legionis	Caerleon
Caer Lial	Carlisle
Lindum	Lincoln
Lloegres	Logres (England)
Londinium/Caer Lundein	London
Londinium Road	Watling Street
Llyonesse	Isles of Scilly
Maridunum	Carmarthen
Caer Melyn	Camelot
Mor Hafren	Bristol Channel
Muir Éireann	Irish Sea
Muir Nicht	"The Narrow Seas" (English Channel)
Caer Myrddin	Carmarthen
Orcades	Orkney
Pictland	Scotland
Ynys Prydein	"Isle of the Mighty" (Great Britain)
Rotunda	The Round Table
Saecsen Shore	Saxon Shore
Saecsland	Jutland
"Shrine Hill"	Glastonbury Abbey
"The Summerlands"	Somerset
Caer Uisc	Exeter
Uladh	Ulster
Vandalia	Andalusia
Venta Belgarum/Caer Uintan	Winchester
"The Wall"	Hadrian's Wall
Ynys Witrin	"Isle of Glass" (Glastonbury)

== Television series ==
In November 2022, The Daily Wire announced its intention to produce an adaptation of the series. In July 2023, it was announced that The Daily Wire Co-CEO Jeremy Boreing would be taking a leave of absence from the company, to co-direct the seven-episode television series. It was additionally revealed that the series would outsource its filming and production abroad, namely in Italy and Hungary, and would premiere on DailyWire+ in 2025. In September, British actor Tom Sharp was announced to have been in the series' lead role as Merlin, as filming began in Europe. Later that month, the series' main cast was revealed, which includes Brett Cooper as Ganieda, Rose Reid as Charis, and James Arden as Taliesin. It premiered in January 2026.
