= The Pendragon Cycle: Rise of the Merlin =

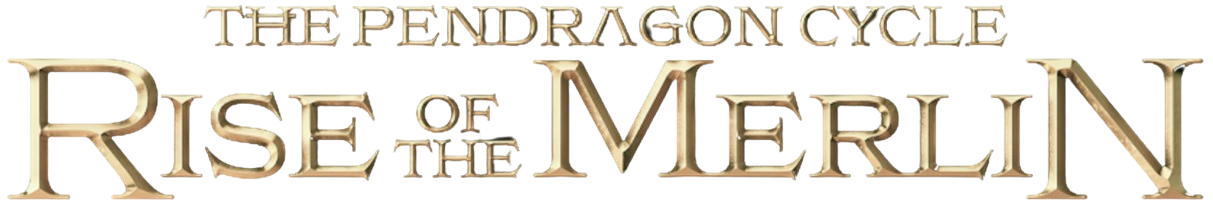
- Genre: Historical fantasy
- Created by: Jeremy Boreing
- Based on: The Pendragon Cycle by Stephen R. Lawhead
- Directed by: Jeremy Boreing; Ryan Whitaker; Jesse V. Johnson
- Starring: Tom Sharp; James Arden; Rose Reid; Emree Franklin; Finney Cassidy; Myles Clohessy; Brett Cooper; Alex Laurence Phillips; Daniel Fathers; George Prentice; Duran Fultan Brown; Flo Tompstone; David Brooks; Alex Arco; George Osborne
- Country of origin: United States
- Original language: English
- No. of seasons: 1
- No. of episodes: 7

Production
- Executive producers: Jeremy Boreing; Ben Shapiro; Caleb Robinson; Dallas Sonnier; Daniel Kresmery; Ryan Whitaker
- Producers: Travis Mills; Jonathan Hay; Amanda Presmyk; Jonathan Halperyn; Jerilyn Esquibel; Augusto Pelliccia; Julius Nasso; Stephen R. Lawhead

Original release
- Network: DailyWire+
- Release: January 22, 2026 – present

The Pendragon Cycle: Rise of the Merlin is an American historical fantasy television series created by Bonfire Legend Based on the book series The Pendragon Cycle by Stephen R. Lawhead, namely the first two books Taliesin (1987) and Merlin (1988), the series is a retelling of Arthurian legend set in Roman Britain and especially its original milieu, Sub-Roman Britain. It premiered January 22, 2026 on DailyWire+ and worldwide on Amazon Prime Video later in the year.

== Premise ==
The series follows Merlin, the immortal son of the bard Taliesin and Atlantean Princess Charis, chronicling his tragic upbringing, descent into madness, and shocking disappearance that led to the legend that surrounds him. Set before King Arthur's birth, Merlin, assumed dead or a myth, reemerges in Sub-Roman Britain to unite the fractured kingdoms under threat from Saxon invaders.

== Cast ==
=== Main cast ===
- Tom Sharp as Merlin
- James Arden as Taliesin
- Rose Reid as Charis
- Emree Franklin as Morgian
- Finney Cassidy as Aurelius
- Myles Clohessy as Uther
- Alex Laurence Phillips as Pelleas
- Brett Cooper as Ganieda
- Daniel Fathers as Avallach
- Steve Varnom as Custennin
- George Prentice as Dafyd
- Duran Fultan Brown as Elphin
- Flo Thompstone as Ygerna
- David Brooks as Tewdrig
- Alex Arco as Meurig
- George Osborne as Lot

=== Guest stars ===
- Colin Cunningham as Vortigern (Note: Colin Cunningham was billed as "Special Appearance" in the end credits of episode 3.)
- Nicholas Boulton as Morcant
- Thor Rosland as Hengist
- Chick Allan as Gorlas

== Episodes ==
No.	Title	Directed by	Written by	Original release date
1	"Island of the Mighty"	Jeremy Boreing	Jeremy Boreing	January 22, 2026
The age of the ancient gods comes to an end in post-Roman Britain, with tribes in chaos and invaders looming. A prince (Elphin) rescues a mysterious baby from a river—miraculously reborn—destined to be the great bard Taliesin. Meanwhile, in Atlantis, Princess Charis faces the destruction of her city, visions of the bull god Bel, and the collapse of her civilization. Years later, Taliesin (now an adult) crosses paths with Charis, beginning a forbidden love between different worlds.
2	"The Vision of Taliesin"	Jeremy Boreing	Jeremy Boreing & Rose Reid	January 22, 2026
Taliesin possesses an intense prophetic vision, with biblical references (such as Moses and Sodom). His love for Charis (of Atlantean origins) generates a prophecy that will outlive the ancient world. There is betrayal, jealousy, magic, and a clash between pagan gods and the one true God. The couple faces family and cultural obstacles, culminating in a Christian marriage and Charis's baptism.
3	"A Fatherless Child"	Jesse V. Johnson	Jeremy Boreing	January 29, 2026
Fast-forwarding approximately 75 years, Merlin (now an adult, played by Tom Sharp) returns to civilization after years of isolation in the wilderness—transformed by trials, faith, and visions. He appears disheveled and prophetic, proving his visions by predicting events (such as approaching enemies and water sources). He confronts Vortigern, negotiates the release of Christian monks, discusses the "Sword of Britain", and helps prepare the ground for a king to unite the lands against Saxon invaders like Hengist. There is a focus on punishing the wicked, emerging alliances including with Uther Pendragon, and a poignant reunion with his mother Charis at the end, in the place where she lived in seclusion.
4	"The King of Maridunum"	Ryan Whitaker	Ryan Whitaker	February 5, 2026
Following Vortigern's fall, Britain bleeds in chaos and rival ambitions. Pascent (Vortigern's son) seeks revenge and allies himself with the Saxon Hengist, sealing a deadly pact to overthrow Constance's sons Aurelius and Uther. Merlin seeks unity, reuniting with his mother Charis and grandfather the Atlantean King Avallach. Aurelius and Uther are hosted; tensions between brothers arise (Aurelius more diplomatic, Uther impatient). Avallach emphasizes the need for a High King who seeks both justice and mercy. Morgian deepens the betrayal; internal threats (faith tested, bad bargains) outweigh external ones. Lines are drawn and loyalties tested, with Merlin, Pelleas and Uther riding to other kingdoms in hopes of forging alliances amidst the kings of Britain. Merlin's past is slowly revealed to the untrusting Uther as he believes Merlin will betray his brother Aurelius.
5	"The Price of Failure"	Ryan Whitaker	Josiah Nelson	February 12, 2026
Tensions build and schemes unfold among the Kings in Aurelius' war camp. Gorlas, king of Tintagel and a seasoned warrior, doubts Aurelius and Uther’s lack of experience and capability of leading their army to victory against overwhelming Saxon invaders. Uther's rage and loyalty to his brother risks a division among the Kings, dwelling their British soldiers, which would lead to their defeat. Aurelius must prove himself worthy as leader in a clash of honour. Meanwhile, Merlin rides with Pelleas to seek allies for Aurelius in the north. As they draw closer to their destination, Merlin still plagued with visions of a mysterious woman, reflects on his child abduction by the mysterious tribal hill folk. Merlin and Pelleas receive a cold welcoming from King Custennin as a tragedy unresolved and a tense reunion, risks Aurelius' hopes of reinforcements, and past failures resurfacing.
6	"Ganieda"	Ryan Whitaker	Rose Reid	February 19, 2026
50 years ago, Merlin's mysterious past before his sudden disappearance is revealed. After spending 6 years with the hill folk, a young Merlin is unsure whether he has full control over his power or it controls him as he returns to the main land to find his true destiny. On his journey, he encounters a young princess Ganieda who is the daughter of King Custennin and is struck by her beauty. The episode explores Merlin's love for Ganieda, as he grows from a young man, to a husband, to a warrior and to a king himself. However when Merlin's destiny and love collides, tragedy strikes amidst a Saxon attack, turning his life upside down and unleashing his full power onto the world.
7	"The Last True Bard"	Jesse V. Johnson	Josiah Nelson, Ryan Whitaker & Jeremy Boreing	March 5, 2026
Merlin returns as Britain gathers for war. Still out numbered by thousands of Saxons, Aurelius and the kings of Britain devise a desperate plan. Upon the battleground against overwhelming odds, the fate of Britain hangs in the balance while Merlin finds his true calling. Following the victory against Hengist's army, a flashforward shows kings arguing over who should be High King, as Merlin slams the "Sword of Britain" into the stone.

== Production ==
=== Development ===
In November 2022, The Daily Wire announced its intention to produce an adaptation of the series. In July 2023, it was announced that The Daily Wire Co-CEO Jeremy Boreing would be taking a leave of absence from the company, to co-direct the series. It was also revealed that the series would source its filming and production in Italy and Hungary, and would premiere on DailyWire+. Boreing stated that the production's budget was least $1 million per episode, and at least $10 million overall for the whole season. In June 2026, Semafor reported that the show had cost a total of $50 million in total.

=== Casting ===
In September 2023, British actor Tom Sharp was announced to have been cast in the series' lead role as Merlin, as filming began in Europe. Executive Producer Dallas Sonnier recalled Sharp independently auditioned for the title role “To discover Tom Sharp off of a casting tape that was self-submitted without an agent, direct to us, and to find a future movie star out of nowhere is such a cool thing”.

Following Tom Sharp's casting, the remaining main cast were later revealed - Rose Reid as Charis, James Arden as Taliesin, Emree Franklin as Morgian, Finney Cassidy as Aurelius, Myles Clohessy as Uther, Brett Cooper as Ganieda and Alex Laurence Phillips as Pelleas. Additionally cast in the series are Colin Cunningham as Vortigern, Nicholas Boulton as Morcant, Daniel Fathers as Avallach, Thor Rosland as Hengist and Chick Allan as Gorlas.

=== Filming ===
Filming took place from September to December 2023 in Budapest, Trento, Priverno (at the Fossanova Abbey), in the Gran Sasso d'Italia mountains and at the Cinecittà film studio.

== Release ==
The Pendragon Cycle: Rise of the Merlin premiered on January 22, 2026, consisting of seven episodes.

In late July 2026, The Pendragon Cycle: Rise of the Merlin was released on Amazon Prime Video in Europe, reaching #3 series overall in the UK and Ireland, and #4 in Spain. After its release in the United States, the series climbed the Prime Charts reaching #2 overall (TV shows and movies) on September 15.

== Reception ==
The series premiered with largely positive reviews. Screen Rant, MovieWeb and CBR proclaimed the series as a "major streaming hit" after it premiered worldwide on Prime Video. Ed Power for The Telegraph called the show a "brilliant" and "cheery, cheesy series". Roger Avary praised the series comparing it with John Boorman's film Excalibur and against other fantasy shows like The Rings of Power, "it's as good as classic television" and that it was "being buried for political reasons." The series received praise from TV Fanatic and Giant Freakin Robot, with the latter positively comparing it to Game of Thrones. James Melzer for MovieWeb described the show as "a good old-fashioned fantasy" and "worthy entry in the genre that deserves recognition". Tom Sharp's performance received acclaim from entertainment news outlets, with TV Fanatic claiming Sharp in Episode 6 Ganieda "was on another level". Blaze Media praised Sharp's portrayal of Merlin as "multifaceted" and that he "carries Merlin through a formidable range...without turning him into a wizardly caricature."

A less favorable review from Josh Rosenberg for Esquire panned the series as "terrible" and "simply incomprehensible" and referred to it as a "discount Game of Thrones."
