= Carl Sherrell =

American illustrator and writer (1929–1990)

- Born: May 10, 1929; Bonner Springs, Kansas, US
- Died: February 7, 1990 (aged 60); Kansas City, Kansas, US
- Occupations: Illustrator, writer
- Writing career
- Genres: fantasy, sci-fi, horror

Carl Sherrell (May 10, 1929 – February 7, 1990) was an American illustrator and writer. He created works of pulp fantasy, sci-fi, and horror. He is most famous for the sword and sorcery trilogy started with Raum.

== Life and work ==
Sherrell was a commercial artist for most of his life, occasionally working as a pulp illustrator for publications such as Fantasy Newsletter or even esoterical non-fiction works such as Frater Albertus's From "One" to "Ten".

Starting in 1979, Sherrell began a career as a novelist in which he would try several genres. His first and most successful attempt was Raum, a sword and sorcery fantasy starring an eponymous anti-hero, the demon Raum, who after being summoned by a wizard into an alternate history medieval Britain causes considerable mayhem before encountering King Arthur, Merlin, Morgan le Fay and other characters of Arthurian Legend who will eventually teach him about life here and inspire him human values.

Despite his first novel's cliffhanger ending, Sherrell would abandon the character and the genre to try a more high fantasy-oriented style in Arcane, starring a fool in a world governed by the rules of tarot. It would be followed by the space opera The Space Prodigal (1981). The sequel to Raum, Skraelings, would appear in 1987. In it, Raum chases a Viking prince who has stolen his great love, Lady Vivienne, from Iceland to Greenland and up to North America (skrælingjar is how Norse Greenlanders called Native Americans).

The horror novel The Curse (1989) would be Sherrell's last to be published in the English language due to his untimely death in 1990. However, his manuscript of a third book in the Raum series was translated to Spanish and published in Spain in 1995. The first two novels were also translated to German and French.

== Bibliography ==
=== Novels ===
==== Raum trilogy ====
- Raum (Avon, 1977)
- Skraelings (Ace, 1987; second entry in the Raum trilogy)
- The Dark Tournament (appeared in Spanish as El torneo sombrío, Ed. Anaya, unpublished in English, 1995)

==== Standalone ====
- Arcane (Jove, 1978)
- The Space Prodigal (Dell, 1981)
- The Curse (Pageant Books, 1989)
