= Gladys Skelton =

Australian poet, playwright and author

Gladys Skelton (6 September 1885 – 29 September 1975) was an Australian and United Kingdom poet, novelist and playwright who wrote using the pseudonym John Presland.

== Early life ==
Gladys Skelton was born Gladys Williams in Melbourne in 1885.

== Career ==
Skelton gained history honours at Girton College, Cambridge University and was a university lecturer in English literature and lecturer in history and economics. She was one of a group of women writers who used a male pseudonym. In 1928, after a charge by Lord Birkenhead that women writers were inferior, she wrote in their defence and of her use of a pseudonym.

== Personal life ==
In 1920 Skelton obtained a divorce from her husband John Herbert Skelton on the grounds of desertion and adultery but the decree nisi was rescinded in 1921. Skelton married Francis Edmund Bendit in Hampstead in March 1943.

She died in England in 1975.

== Selected works ==
=== Novels ===
- Frustration (1925)
- Dominion (1925) - based on the life of Cecil Rhodes
- Barricade (1926)
- Escape me - Never! (1929)
- Mosaic (1929)
- The Charioteer (1930)
- Albatross (1931)

=== Poetry ===
- The Deluge and Other Poems (1911)
- Songs of Changing Skies (1913)
- Poems of London and Other Verses (1918)
- The Shaken Reed (1943)
- Selected Poems (1961)

=== Plays ===
- The Marionettes (1907) - a puppet show
- Joan of Arc (1909) - historical drama
- Mary Queen of Scots (1910) - historical drama
- Manin and the Defence of Venice (1911)
- Marcus Aurelius (1912)
- Belisarius, General of the East (1913)
- King Monmouth (1916)
- Satni (1929)

=== Non-fiction ===
- Vae Victis: the life of Ludwig von Benedek, 1804-1881. (1934)
- Women in the civilized state (1934)
