= Pelleas =

- Matter of Britain character
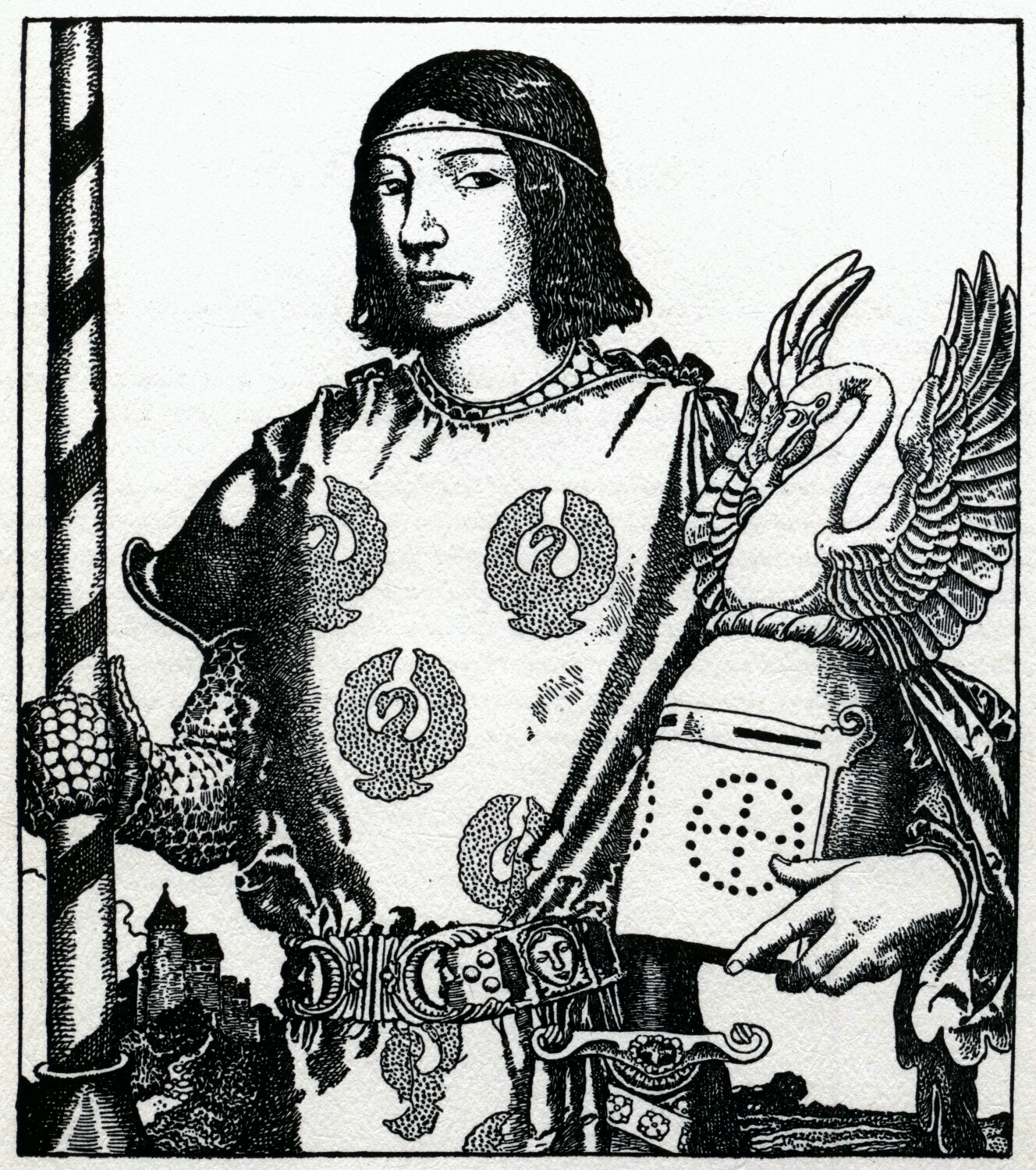
- Sir Pellias, The Gentle Knight, by Howard Pyle from The Story of King Arthur and His Knights (1903)

In-universe information
- Title: Sir
- Occupation: Knight of the Round Table
- Spouse: Arcade or Nimue
- Children: Guivret (with Arcade)

Pelleas /ˈpɛliəs/, or Pellias, is an Arthurian Knight of the Round Table whose story first appears in the Post-Vulgate Cycle. He becomes husband of Nimue the Lady of the Lake in Le Morte d'Arthur.

== Origin ==
According to John Rhys, his character might have been connected to the figure of Pwyll, the fairy Rhiannon's human husband in Welsh mythology.

== Medieval literature ==
In a section of the Post-Vulgate Suite du Merlin, Pellias, the son of a poor vavasour, seeks the love of the high-born lady named Arcade. Though he wins her a golden circlet in a tournament, she spurns him, holes up in her castle refusing to see him, and sends her knights daily to humiliate him in hopes of driving him away. During the course of unrelated adventures, Gawain, Arthur's nephew, witnesses Pellias's humiliation and vows to help him by going to Arcade wearing Pellias' armour so that it appears that Pellias killed Gawain. Once in her confidences, Gawain plans to woo Arcade on behalf of Pellias, delivering her to him. Instead, Gawain falls for Arcade himself, his passion causing him to forget his promise to Pellias. When Gawain does not return with the maiden, Pellias seeks them out and finds them in bed together. Though distraught, Pellias cannot bring himself to kill them, so leaves his bare sword between them in the bed and returns home, where he says he will never leave his bed until he dies from grief. The next morning, Arcade recognises the sword and Gawain remembers his promise. He convinces Arcade to love Pellias and arranges for them to meet. The pair marry and have a son, Guivret, who later becomes one of Arthur's knights.

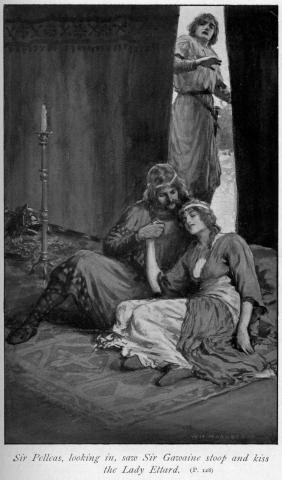
"Sir Pelleas, looking in, saw Sir Gawaine stoop and kiss the Lady Ettard." W. H. Margetson's illustration for Legends of King Arthur and His Knights (1914)

Thomas Malory reworked the Post-Vulgate version in "The Story of Pelleas and Ettard" from the first book of his compilation Le Morte d'Arthur. There, Gawain leaves the maiden—who in this version is called Ettard or Ettarde—after the incident with the sword. Nimue (Nenyve), one of the Ladies of the Lake, comes upon Pelleas, hears his story, and casts a spell that makes him love herself. She then punishes Ettard's abuse of him, enchanting her to fall in love with Pelleas as deeply as he loved her. Pelleas spurns Ettard, and she dies of sorrow. Nimue and Pelleas later marry, after which she keeps protecting him for the rest of his life.

Pelleas also appears as a minor character at other points in both of these works. He is seen fighting in tournaments and attempts to defend Guinevere from her abductor Maleagant as one of the Queen's Knights.

== Modern culture ==
In Tennyson's black comedy idyll "Pelleas and Ettarre" from Idylls of the King, Pelleas is knighted by Arthur at a young age. As a young knight, he deeply loves the maiden named Ettarre who finds his youthful shyness and stammering bothersome and does not return his affection. She lies to him to induce him to give her a golden arm circlet, the prize of a tournament that he won, as a token of his love. Ettarre, selfish and having gained the circlet and thus some social elevation, desires to be left alone; but despite her treachery Pelleas cannot forget her. He defeats all knights sent by her but, after each victory, deliberately allows himself to be captured and taken prisoner to her castle, as it is the only way that he can ever see his true love. Unsympathetic, Ettarre takes his horse from him and sends him on his way, only to return again and again. Gawain offers to try to persuade Ettarre to love Pelleas. Gawain instead lies to her, telling her he has slain Pelleas, and betrays him, sleeping with her himself. Pelleas finds the two together sleeping, and leaves his sword on their chests, revealing that he is alive and well, but also as a sign of honour, as he says he cannot kill a knight such as Gawain in his sleep.

In the 2026 television series The Pendragon Cycle: Rise of the Merlin, Pelleas is portrayed by Alex Laurence Phillips.
