= Bonfire Legend =

Film production company based in Dallas

Cinestate Holdings LLC
- Trade name: Bonfire Legend
- Type: Private
- Industry: Motion pictures
- Predecessor: CINESTATE
- Founded: March 21, 2016; 10 years ago
- Founder: Dallas Sonnier
- Headquarters: Nashville, Tennessee, United States
- Services: Movie production
- Owner: Dallas Sonnier
- Website: Official website

Cinestate Holdings LLC
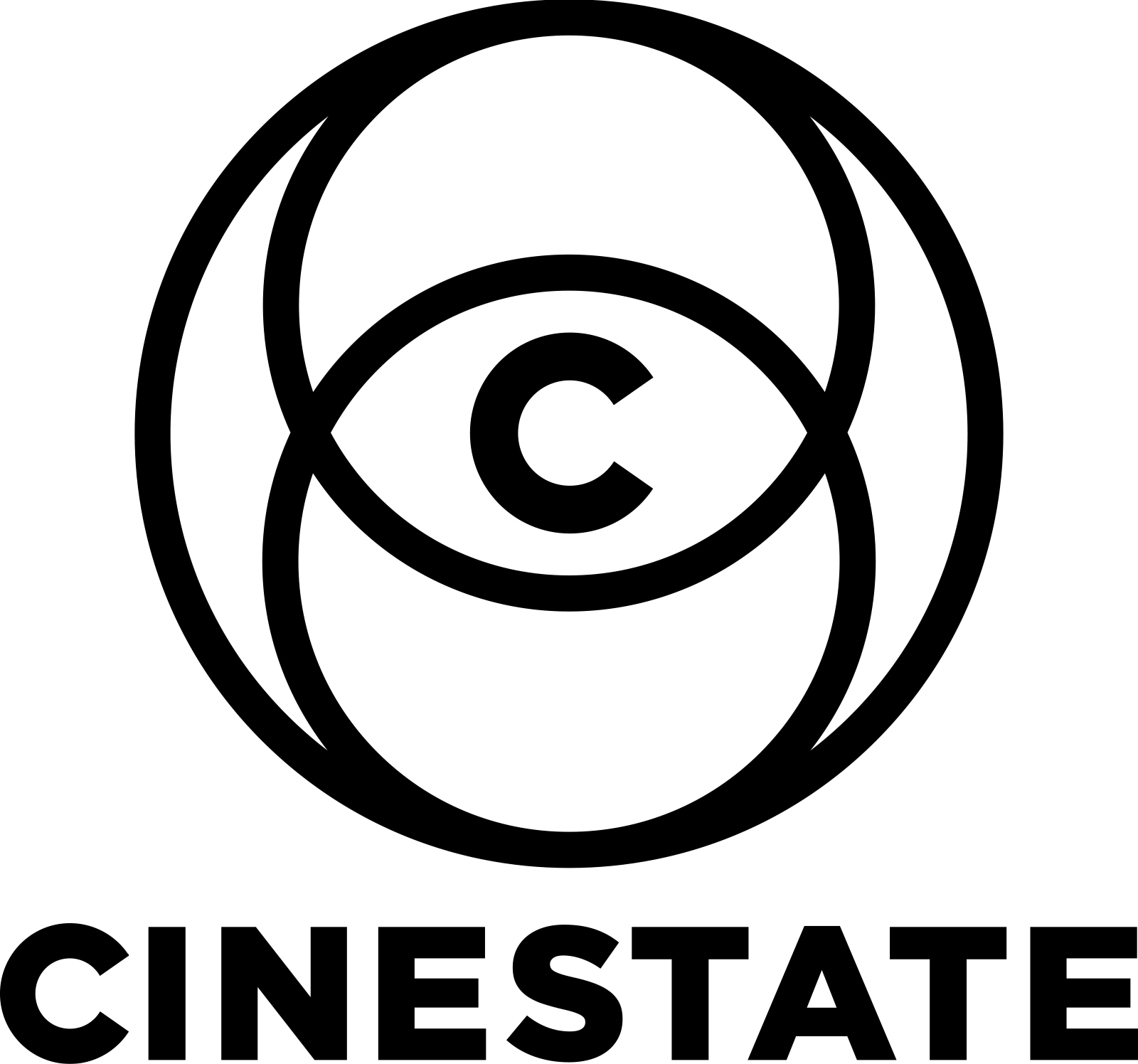
- Trade name: CINESTATE
- Type: Private
- Industry: Motion pictures
- Founded: March 21, 2016; 10 years ago
- Founder: Dallas Sonnier
- Defunct: December 2020
- Fate: Shut down
- Successor: Bonfire Legend
- Headquarters: Dallas, Texas, United States
- Services: Movie production; Magazine publishing; Book publishing
- Owner: Dallas Sonnier
- Divisions: Fangoria (2018–2020); Rebeller (2019–2020)
- Website: cinestate.com cinestate.com at the Wayback Machine (archived December 9, 2020)

Bonfire Legend, owned by Cinestate Holdings LLC, is an American film production brand begun in 2021 by Dallas Sonnier. It was launched following the closure in 2020 of the CINESTATE film production brand that Sonnier started in 2016. Best known for the 2020 film Run Hide Fight and the 2022 film Terror on the Prairie, it holds a distribution agreement with Nashville-based The Daily Wire.

== Caliber Media ==
Dallas Sonnier moved from Dallas, Texas to California, attending USC and graduating with dual degrees in business and film. In 2008 he launched Caliber Media Company and started managing writer and aspiring director, S. Craig Zahler. After acquiring the script for Bone Tomahawk from Zahler, Sonnier premiered the film through Caliber Media. In 2016, Sonnier moved back to Dallas where he partnered with Will Evans, owner of Deep Vellum Publishing, to form Cinestate.

== Cinestate ==
The company produced ten films under a variety of production labels, in addition to retroactively claiming the 2015 film Bone Tomahawk, produced independently by Sonnier, as a Cinestate movie. In 2017, the company acquired Fangoria magazine, relaunching it in 2018 as a print-only collectible under the editorial oversight of Phil Nobile Jr. In 2019, the company announced the launch of Rebeller Media, an action label that would have encompassed a production company and lifestyle website to be managed by Washington Free Beacon journalist Sonny Bunch. In 2020, following the arrest of producer Adam Donaghey for sexual assault and a Daily Beast article alleging misconduct on Cinestate sets, Rebeller was shut down and Fangoria sold, all Cinestate social media and websites went dormant, and all staff were laid off.

Two films produced by Cinestate under the "Fangoria Presents" and "Rebeller" labels, The Seventh Day and South of Heaven, respectively, were sold to distributors and released following the company's closure under the ad hoc label "Swiss Avenue Productions," named for the street where the company headquarters were once located.

=== Fangoria ===
In 2018, Cinestate acquired Fangoria magazine from the Brooklyn Company for an undisclosed price, with plans to re-launch the publication as a quarterly edition and additionally develop Fangoria into a brand for producing movies, books and podcasts. As part of the deal, Cinestate controlled all material from over 300 issues of Fangoria magazine over 39 years.

Following the 2020 Daily Beast article about misconduct on Cinestate sets, the staff of Fangoria staged a walkout in protest, resulting in the brand being sold.

=== Books ===
Cinestate released its first book, S. Craig Zahler's Hug Chickenpenny: The Panegyric of an Anomalous Child, alongside the announcement that Zahler would work with the Jim Henson Company to bring the title protagonist to life in an upcoming feature film. Additionally, Cinestate published The Megarothke, the debut novel from Robert Ashcroft. Its most recent novel released under the Cinestate label was Headcheese by Jess Hagemann. In 2020, a new Rebeller literary imprint was launched; a single title, Natasha Tynes' They Called Me Wyatt, was released shortly before the brand shut down.

== Bonfire Legend ==
A successor imprint, Bonfire Legend, was launched by Sonnier in early 2021 to carry on the mission of the Rebeller Media label, in partnership with The Daily Wire.

== Filmography ==
Film	Director	Production label	Release date
Bone Tomahawk	S. Craig Zahler	Caliber Media (Note: Produced by Dallas Sonnier for Caliber Media, but retroactively claimed as a Cinestate title following the launch of the company.)	September 25, 2015
Brawl in Cell Block 99	S. Craig Zahler	Cinestate	October 6, 2017
Puppet Master: The Littlest Reich	Sonny Laguna and Tommy Wiklund	Fangoria Presents	August 17, 2018
The Standoff at Sparrow Creek	Henry Dunham	Cinestate	January 18, 2019
Satanic Panic	Chelsea Stardust	Fangoria Presents	May 31, 2019
Dragged Across Concrete	S. Craig Zahler	Cinestate	March 22, 2019
VFW	Joe Begos	Fangoria Presents	February 14, 2020
Castle Freak	Tate Steinsiek	Fangoria Presents	December 4, 2020
Run Hide Fight	Kyle Rankin	Bonfire Legend (originally Rebeller)	January 14, 2021
The Seventh Day	Justin P. Lang	Swiss Avenue Pictures (originally Fangoria Presents)	March 26, 2021
South of Heaven	Aharon Keshales	Swiss Avenue Pictures (originally Rebeller)	October 8, 2021
Shut In	D. J. Caruso	Bonfire Legend	February 10, 2022
Terror on the Prairie	Michael Polish	Bonfire Legend	June 14, 2022
Lady Ballers	Jeremy Boreing	Bonfire Legend	December 1, 2023
Am I Racist?	Justin Folk	Bonfire Legend	September 13, 2024
Frontier Crucible	S. Craig Zahler	Bonfire Legend	December 5, 2025
Run Hide Fight: Infidels	Kyle Rankin	Bonfire Legend	September 16, 2026
Confession	Václav Marhoul	Bonfire Legend	November 11, 2026

Television	Directors	Production label	Release date
The Pendragon Cycle: Rise of the Merlin	Jesse V. Johnson, Jeremy Boreing & Ryan Whitaker	Bonfire Legend	January 22, 2026
