= Confession (2026 film) =

2026 film by Václav Marhoul

- Film poster
- Directed by: Václav Marhoul
- Written by: Ben Shapiro
- Produced by: David Guglielmo; Travis Mills; Dallas Sonnier; Sean Calvano; Lillian Campbell; Amanda Presmyk; Ben Shapiro
- Starring: Rob Lowe; James Franco; Nick Nolte; Jennifer Jason Leigh; Emile Hirsch; Colin Bates; Richard Brake; Brad Dourif; Dean Norris; Kodi Smit-McPhee
- Cinematography: Peter Menzies Jr.
- Edited by: Luděk Hudec
- Production company: Bonfire Legend
- Distributed by: The Daily Wire
- Release dates: October 15, 2026 (Warsaw Film Festival); November 11, 2026 (United States)
- Running time: 132 minutes
- Country: United States
- Language: English

Confession is a 2026 American psychological historical drama film directed by Václav Marhoul and written by Ben Shapiro.

== Plot ==
In Moscow in 1938, Alexi, a former literature professor, is arrested and taken to Lubyanka Prison after being accused of conspiring with Mikulski, an insurgent priest. While imprisoned, Alexei is interrogated by one of his former students, Vladimir. Alexei must come to terms with the sins of his past and ultimately finds redemption through faith and sacrifice.

== Cast ==
- Rob Lowe as Alexei
- James Franco as Vladimir
- Jennifer Jason Leigh as Anya
- Nick Nolte as Aleksandr
- Brad Dourif as Father Mikulski
- Kodi Smit-McPhee as Sasha
- Emile Hirsch as Dmitri
- Richard Brake as Bogdan
- Colin Bates as Ilya
- Dean Norris as Boris

== Production ==
Filming began in Los Angeles in November 2025 and wrapped in December.

== Release ==
Confession premiered at the Warsaw Film Festival on October 15, 2026. It had a one-night-only theatrical release on November 11, releasing on The Daily Wire's streaming service the same day.

== Reception ==
The film has received poor reviews. Joe Leydon, writing for Variety, said "Rob Lowe and James Franco add some spark to Václav Marhoul’s deliberately paced, sluggishly talky drama." Frank Scheck of The Hollywood Reporter called the film "terminally tedious" and "[h]opelessly stilted in its execution." Rebecca Onion of Slate derided the "canned feeling of the script and the monotony of the direction" but praised Rob Lowe's performance saying "a real tribute to the craft of the professional actor that such a darkly lit, visually boring movie could be at all watchable."
