= Dragged Across Concrete =

2018 film by S. Craig Zahler

- Theatrical release poster
- Directed by: S. Craig Zahler
- Written by: S. Craig Zahler
- Produced by: Keith Kjarval; Dallas Sonnier; Jack Heller; Tyler Jackson; Sefton Fincham
- Starring: Mel Gibson; Vince Vaughn; Tory Kittles; Michael Jai White; Jennifer Carpenter; Laurie Holden; Fred Melamed; Thomas Kretschmann; Don Johnson
- Cinematography: Benji Bakshi
- Edited by: Greg D'Auria
- Music by: Jeff Herriott; S. Craig Zahler
- Production companies: Unified Pictures; Cinestate; Look to the Sky Films; The Fyzz Facility; Realmbuilder Productions; Assemble Media; Moot Point Productions
- Distributed by: Summit Entertainment (through Lionsgate Films)
- Release dates: September 3, 2018 (Venice); March 22, 2019 (United States)
- Running time: 159 minutes
- Countries: United States; Canada
- Language: English
- Budget: $15 million
- Box office: $660,132

Dragged Across Concrete is a 2018 neo-noir action thriller film, written and directed by S. Craig Zahler. It stars an ensemble cast that includes Mel Gibson, Vince Vaughn, Tory Kittles, Michael Jai White, Jennifer Carpenter, Laurie Holden, Fred Melamed, Thomas Kretschmann, and Don Johnson. The story follows two childhood friends and two police detectives suspended for police brutality who, in a desperate need for money, are embroiled in a robbery done by a professional thief.

Zahler started working on Dragged Across Concrete right after he finished development of his previous film Brawl in Cell Block 99, which also starred Vaughn, Carpenter and Johnson. Vaughn recommended Zahler to Gibson, whom he had previously worked with in Hacksaw Ridge, and Gibson agreed to star in the film, later followed by Kittles and White. Filming took place in Vancouver between July and September 2017 under a production budget of $15 million.

The film premiered at the 75th Venice International Film Festival on September 3, 2018, before receiving a simultaneous limited theatrical and video-on-demand release by Summit Entertainment on March 22, 2019. The film garnered a mixed reception; reviewers praised Mel Gibson’s performance alongside the film's dark thematic elements and atmosphere, though its extensive runtime, graphic violence, and performance styles drew criticism. Despite achieving several nominations at the 45th Saturn Awards, the film was a box office bomb.

== Plot ==
In the fictional city of Bulwark, recent parolee Henry Johns chastises his mother for returning to prostitution and taking drugs, before reuniting with his handicapped younger brother Ethan.

Three weeks later, detectives Brett Ridgeman and Anthony Lurasetti are suspended without pay for alleged police brutality against a drug dealer. Ridgeman needs cash to move his family to a safer neighborhood and Lurasetti hopes to propose marriage to his girlfriend Denise. Friedrich, a wealthy businessman with criminal connections, tips Ridgeman to an opportunity to rob Lorentz Vogelmann, a heroin distributor whose violent robberies have paid for a customized bulletproof van.

Henry and his childhood friend Biscuit are Vogelmann's getaway drivers. Vogelmann and his crew - Grey Gloves and Black Gloves - enter a bank and take everyone hostage. Kelly Summer, newly returned to work from maternity leave, is executed by the bank robbers after preventing a colleague from notifying the police via email. The thieves castrate the bank manager and escape with bullion and a hostage, Cheryl. Henry notices that Ridgeman and Lurasetti, who have been surveilling Vogelmann, are following them. Unsettled by the violence of the robbery, and realizing he and Biscuit may also be killed, Henry keeps quiet. Lurasetti berates Ridgeman for not intervening or notifying the authorities before the robbers' violent acts. Ridgeman asserts that law enforcement would be too late, and only the two of them can deal with the thieves. Lurasetti, unwilling to delay his proposal any longer, leaves Denise a voicemail guiding her to the engagement ring.

At a garage in the countryside, Biscuit leaps out of the van and is shot. Henry wounds Grey Gloves with a hidden gun. Mortally wounded, Biscuit swallows the van's key, implores Henry to take care of his mother, and is shot dead by the thieves. Cheryl pulls Biscuit's body into the van and Black Gloves cuts the key out of his stomach. Ridgeman and Lurasetti arrive and ram the van, knocking it over. Cheryl is coerced by Vogelmann into faking an escape that lets her shoot Lurasetti, and is killed by Ridgeman in turn. Ridgeman kills Black Gloves attempting to escape from the van. Lurasetti listens to a voicemail from Denise, declining his proposal, and succumbs to his wounds.

Ridgeman fills the van with tear gas, and kills Grey Gloves as he surrenders. Before Ridgeman can torch the van, Henry fires a warning shot and insists the valuable contents be spared. Ridgeman kills Vogelmann before he can shoot him from inside the van. Henry shoots Ridgeman in the foot and reveals he's recorded the entire incident on his cellphone and can identify Ridgeman as a detective. Ridgeman disarms Henry and proposes they split the stolen bullion. They load the bodies and bullion in the getaway car and tow Lurasetti's car to a dump site. Ridgeman produces a hidden firearm and orders Henry to delete the video. They shoot at each other and Ridgeman is mortally wounded. Henry agrees to bury Lurasetti and take care of Ridgeman's family, and buries all the bodies. He promises the deceased Biscuit he'll return and give him proper burial, so he won't be buried next to the police.

Eleven months later, Henry is living in a luxury mansion with his mother and brother. He sends Ridgeman's family a package containing a share of the gold bullion.

== Cast ==
- Mel Gibson as Detective Brett Ridgeman
- Vince Vaughn as Detective Anthony Lurasetti
- Tory Kittles as Henry Johns
- Michael Jai White as "Biscuit"
- Jennifer Carpenter as Kelly Summer
- Laurie Holden as Melanie Ridgeman
- Fred Melamed as Mr. Edmington
- Udo Kier as Friedrich
- Tattiawna Jones as Denise
- Justine Warrington as Cheryl
- Jordyn Ashley Olson as Sara Ridgeman
- Liannet Borrego as Rosalinda
- Myles Truitt as Ethan Johns
- Vanessa Bell Calloway as Jennifer Johns
- Noel G. as Vasquez
- Primo Allon as Black Gloves
- Matthew MacCaull as Grey Gloves
- Thomas Kretschmann as Lorentz Vogelmann
- Don Johnson as Chief Lieutenant Calvert
- Richard Newman as Feinbaum

== Production ==
=== Development ===
On February 1, 2017, right after finishing production of his previous film Brawl in Cell Block 99, S. Craig Zahler signed to direct Dragged Across Concrete, a crime thriller based on police brutality, from a screenplay he had written. The script is 162 pages long and remained unchanged at the time of filming, and was Zahler's favorite screenplay to write. The story is influenced by the film The Killing directed by Stanley Kubrick and the films Dog Day Afternoon and Prince of the City directed by Sidney Lumet, Prince of the City being one of Zahler's favorite films.

Zahler states: "I’m aware there are lines and moments in my films and books and future movies that will land poorly for some people or get people to hate me. That is your right. I have a right to do my own vision and hope it’s enough to get me to the next one." In an interview with The Daily Beast, Zahler states that the intent of the film is not to address societal ills or invoke a provocation, but to explore "splitting hairs in terms of what the difference is" between the societal issues. Zahler exemplifies Brett Ridgeman, one of the characters in the film, is "an embittered guy, not really happy with his station in life, and with a heavy hand, and doing some stuff that he shouldn’t be doing, and he’s suspended" and trying to get himself out of the hole that he dug with all of these mistakes. Vince Vaughn, who plays Brett's partner Anthony Lurasetti, states that Dragged Across Concrete is "not an agenda movie" but a morality tale.

Dragged Across Concrete has slice of life scenes not related to the plot progression, such as Jennifer Carpenter's character Kelly Summer not wanting to leave her child for work, Vince Vaughn's character Anthony Lurasetti eating a sandwich in a car, and Tory Kittles' character Henry Johns talking to Michael Jai White's character "Biscuit" about their childhoods, and are some of Zahler's favorite scenes in the film. Despite these scenes taking a lot of the running time in the film, Zahler believes that coupled with the atmosphere and the subsequent twists, the scenes result in the characters becoming more interesting than the plot.

Keith Kjarval of Unified Pictures produced the film along with Zahler and Dallas Sonnier of Cinestate, Assemble Media's Jack Heller, and Sefton Fincham of Look to the Sky Films, with Kjarval's Unified Film Fund financing. The project sought a distributor at the European Film Market at the 67th Berlin International Film Festival in February 2017. In May 2017, Lionsgate acquired the US distribution rights to the film, and would release it through its subsidiary, Summit Entertainment.

=== Casting ===
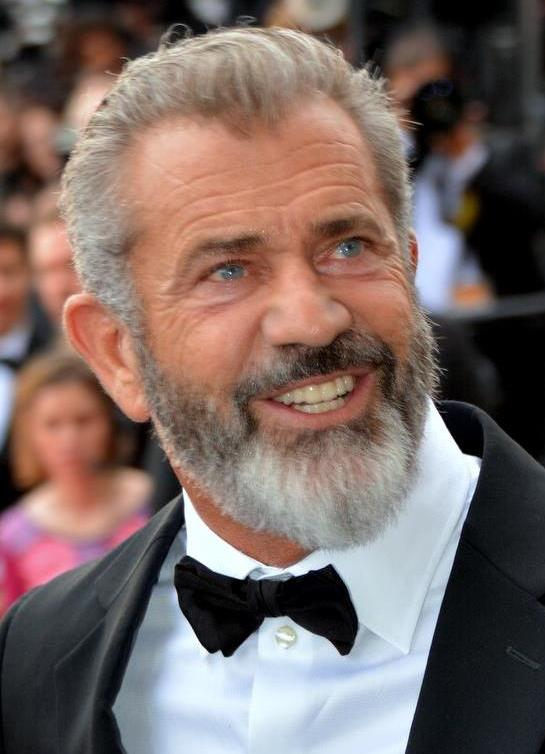
Mel Gibson, who plays Brett Ridgeman

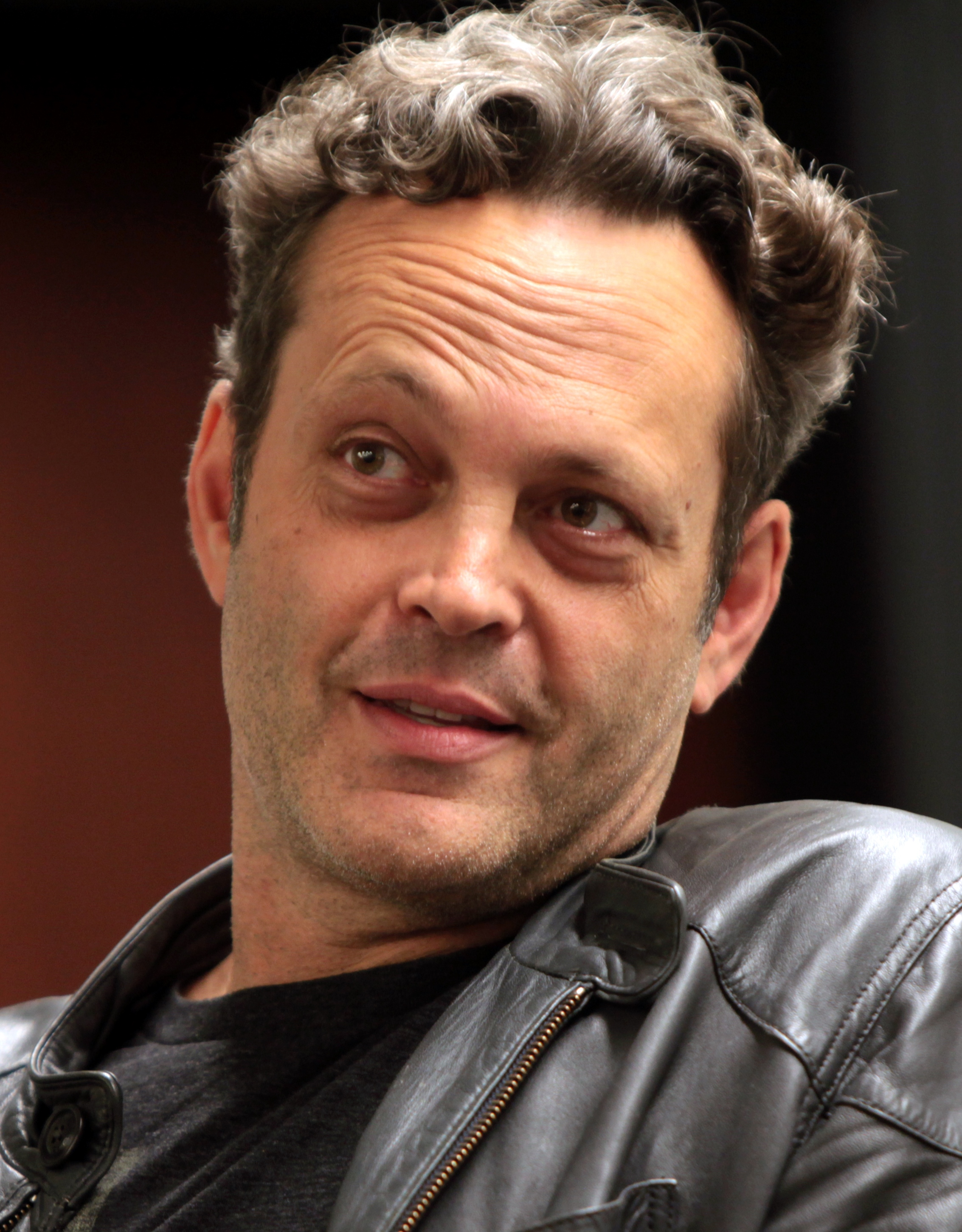
Vince Vaughn, who plays Anthony Lurasetti

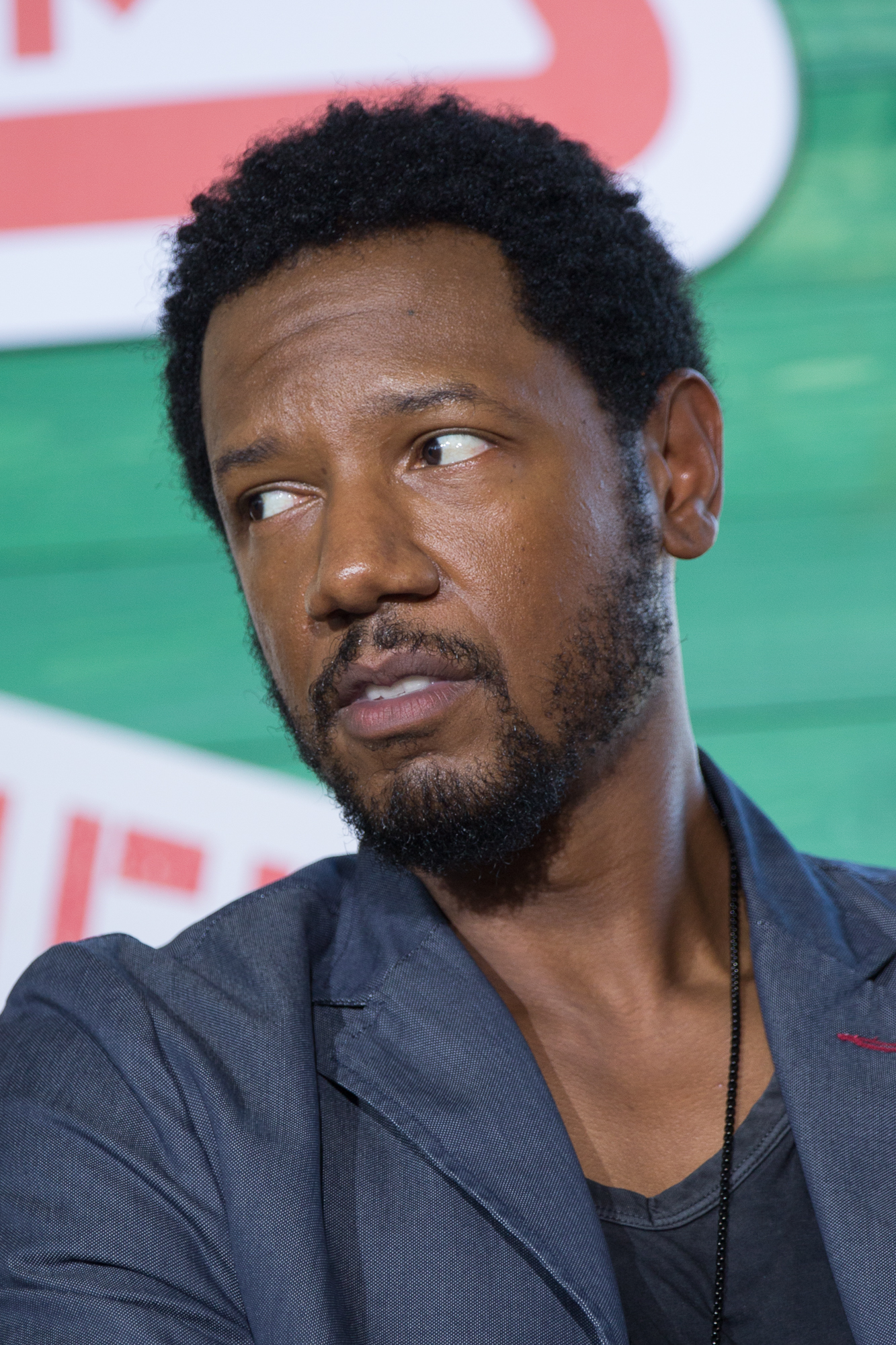
Tory Kittles, who plays Henry Johns

Vince Vaughn starred in S. Craig Zahler's previous film Brawl in Cell Block 99 as the lead character Bradley Thomas. Vaughn gave the script of Dragged Across Concrete to Mel Gibson, who worked with Vaughn in the 2016 film Hacksaw Ridge as the film director, asking him to star in the film and recommended him to watch Brawl in Cell Block 99. Zahler was able to contact Gibson through Vaughn and hoped that he would star in the film. On February 1, 2017, Gibson signed on to the film, with he and Vaughn starring as police officers that are suspended due to committing police brutality.

On August 2, 2017, Jennifer Carpenter and Don Johnson, who had worked with Zahler in Brawl in Cell Block 99, signed onto the film, followed by Tory Kittles, Michael Jai White, Tattiawna Jones, and Laurie Holden. Since Vaughn and Gibson are both well-known conservatives in Hollywood, The Daily Beast claimed this may hinder the financing of the film. However, Zahler believes they are the perfect match for their respective roles, and the studio was willing to fund the film's production after Vaughn and Gibson's casting. Zahler praised Gibson for his collaboration and acting in the film. Gibson previously played a police sergeant in the Lethal Weapon franchise but the films had no bearing on the script nor the casting changes of Dragged Across Concrete.

=== Filming ===
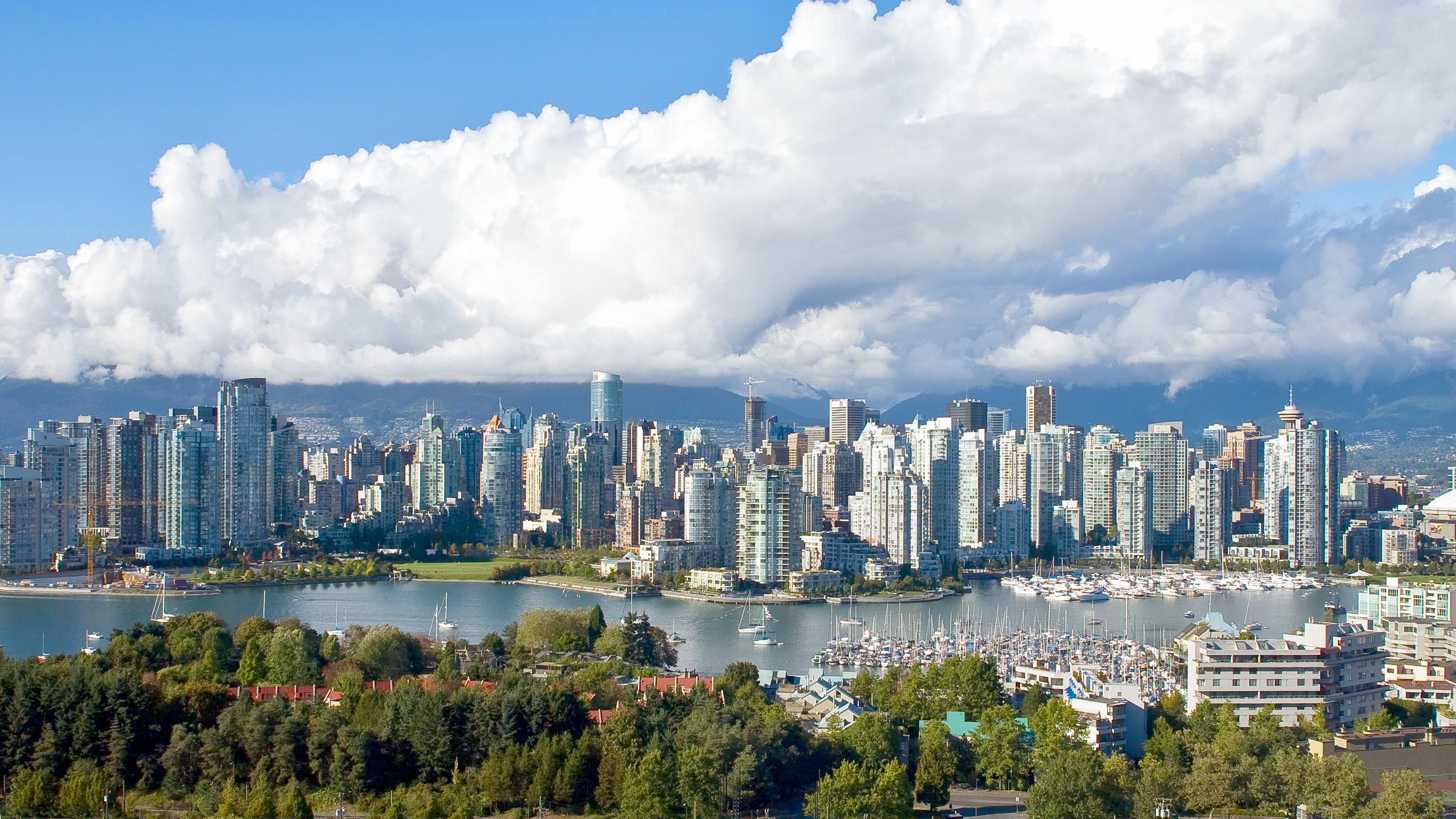
Vancouver, British Columbia, where filming took place

Principal photography on the film began in Vancouver, British Columbia on July 17, 2017 and wrapped on September 16, 2017. Zahler wanted Dragged Across Concrete to be seen as realistic by the audience, filming an actual car collision on set for one of the scenes rather than supplemented in the editing room. Shooting of the film was extremely challenging due to complex and dangerous stunts when filming a broken window, a car crash, or someone being shot. Dragged Across Concrete is less violent than Zahler's previous films Bone Tomahawk and Brawl in Cell Block 99 due to the difference in weapons and fighting styles utilized by the characters.

== Music ==
Dragged Across Concrete (Original Motion Picture Soundtrack)

Soundtrack album by Jeff Herriott, S. Craig Zahler
- Released: March 22, 2019
- Genre: Soul
- Length: 34:55
- Label: Lakeshore Records

The film's soundtrack was composed by S. Craig Zahler and his friend Jeff Herriott, having previously worked together in Bone Tomahawk and Brawl in Cell Block 99. The duo wrote several soul pieces and recruiting the rhythm and blues group The O'Jays to sing the songs. Zahler was influenced by jazz musicians such as Charles Mingus and John Coltrane in creating the soundtrack.

Lakeshore Records released the soundtrack on March 22, 2019, in CD, digital, and vinyl formats, which coincided with the release date of the film. Pat Padua of The Washington Post called some of the music pieces "slightly jarring, but they contribute to a sense of reality that is at once familiar and unsettling."

No.	Title	Music	Length
1.	"Street Corner Felines"	Eddie Levert, Walter Williams, The O'Jays	4:48
2.	"Gilded Life of the Rich Man"	Eddie Levert, Walter Williams, The O'Jays	5:01
3.	"Sneaking Around at Night"	Butch Tavares	4:15
4.	"My Magic Tricks"	Adi Armour	5:02
5.	"A Better Place for Us"	S. Craig Zahler	4:30
6.	"She's My Ice Cream Sundae"	Butch Tavares	2:42
7.	"Don't Close the Drive In"	Butch Tavares	4:48
8.	"Shotgun Safari"	Eddie Levert, Walter Williams, The O'Jays	3:49
Total length:			34:55

== Release ==
In May 2017, Lionsgate Films acquired the US distribution rights to the film, and would release it through its subsidiary, Summit Entertainment. The film's world premiere was at the 75th Venice International Film Festival on September 3, 2018. Dragged Across Concrete was then given a theatrical and video on demand release in the United States on March 22, 2019.

Dragged Across Concrete was released on digital download, DVD and Blu-ray disc in the United States under Lionsgate Films on April 30, 2019, including two special features, a short featurette titled "Moral Conflict: Creating Cinema That Challenges" and a 40-minute three-part featurette, "Elements of a Crime". Studio Canal released it in the UK on August 19, 2019, across all three formats.

=== Critical response ===
Dragged Across Concrete received positive reviews from critics and audiences alike, with praise directed towards Gibson's performance, worldbuilding, and the dark themes and criticism directed towards the runtime and excessive violence. Reception was more polarized on the film's treatment of racism and police brutality.

On review aggregator Rotten Tomatoes, Dragged Across Concrete holds an approval rating of 76% based on 153 reviews, with an average rating of 6.9/10. The website's consensus reads, "As grim and grinding as its title, Dragged Across Concrete opts for slow-burning drama instead of high-speed thrills — and has just the right cast to make it work." On Metacritic, the film has an average score of 60 out of 100, based on 28 critics, indicating "mixed or average" reviews.

Kevin Maher of The Times gave the film four out of five stars, writing: "in this new, bleak and often unexpectedly grand genre movie (it’s essentially a buddy cop flick, but with operatic ambitions), the thread out of place, both irritably scratching and strangely arresting, is Mel Gibson."

Peter Bradshaw of The Guardian also rated Dragged Across Concrete four out of five stars, stating: "this is a long film, but there is something so horribly compelling about its unhurried slouch towards the precipice."

David Fear of Rolling Stone awarded the film a three and a half out of five stars, praising Gibson's performance and the world-building: "Dragged Across Concrete is apt to send crime-film fanatics, especially ones who prefer their pulp nasty, brutish and incredibly long, into frothing fits of glee."

Kieran Fisher of Film School Rejects praised the dialogue interactions between the detectives, Kittles' performance, and Zahler's intention to challenge the moral position of the audience, while acknowledging that the film will attract controversy: "Still, if you just want to see a great crime epic that cares more about telling a great story than promoting an agenda, you’ll want to check out Dragged Across Concrete. It’s going to be a contender for the best of 2019 when it’s all said and done, even if some viewers will feel guilty about enjoying it so much."

Armond White of National Review praised it as a conservative action film, writing that it "vividly conveys the feeling of suffering, bitterness, and struggle"; later rating it among the 20 best films of the decade.

=== Accolades ===
At the 40th Golden Raspberry Awards, Dragged Across Concrete was nominated in a new category, "Worst Reckless Disregard for Human Life and Public Property." WhatCulture criticized the nomination, saying that it "feels as though voters just wanted to nominate Joker for the enormous social media publicity it would generate, and then shaped a dubious awards category around it. Dragged Across Concrete is an even weirder pick, though, both because of its low-budget nature and the fact that there's not that much carnage in it. Michael Bay's 6 Underground is clearly a far worthier nominee than either of those films, given how much obvious human collateral damage is racked up amid the chaotic action sequences."

Award	Category	Recipient(s)	Result
Saturn Awards	Best Thriller Film	Dragged Across Concrete	Nominated
Saturn Awards	Best Actor	Mel Gibson	Nominated
Saturn Awards	Best Make-up	Lisa Love, Tate Steinsiek	Nominated
Saturn Awards	Best Writing	S. Craig Zahler	Nominated
