= Fred Melamed =

American actor (born 1956)

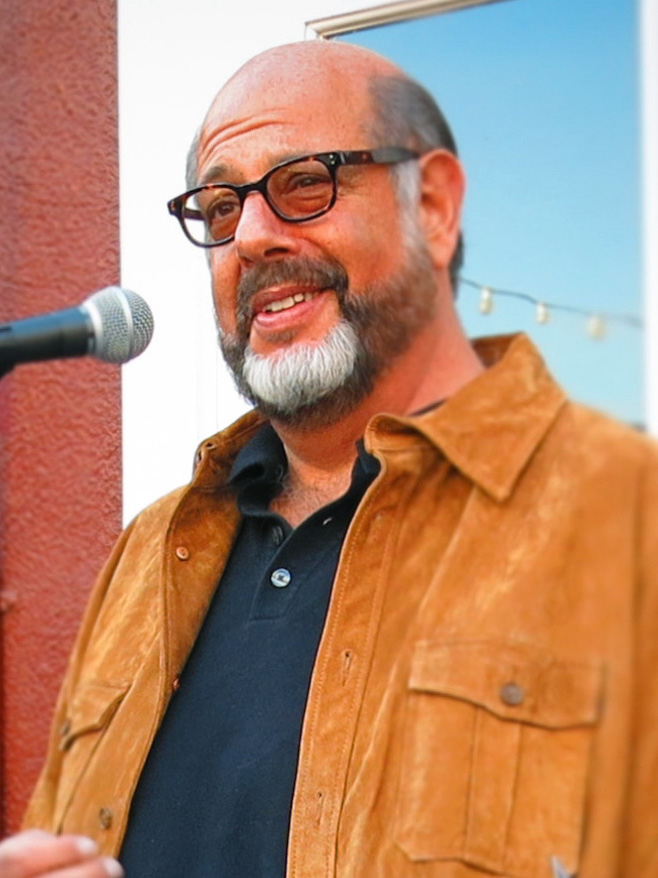
- Melamed in 2013
- Born: May 13, 1956 (age 70); New York City, New York, U.S.
- Education: Hampshire College (BA); Yale University (MFA)
- Occupation: Actor
- Years active: 1981–present
- Spouse: Leslee Spieler (m. 1999; div. 2021)
- Children: 2

Fred Melamed (born May 13, 1956) is an American actor. After spending most of his early career primarily as a voice over artist, and occasionally playing small roles in films, including in seven films directed by Woody Allen, he established himself as a major character actor with his role as Sy Ableman in the Coen brothers' A Serious Man (2009). Other film credits have included In a World... (2012), Hail, Caesar! (2016), and Shiva Baby (2020).

His television roles include Bruce Ben-Bacharach in Lady Dynamite (2016–2017), Gumbald in Adventure Time (2017–2018), Todd Davis in WandaVision (2021), and Tom Posorro in Barry (2022–2023). Vulture named him one of the greatest character actors working today.

== Early life ==
Melamed was born in Queens, New York, the product of a brief love affair between Nancy Zala, an actress and director, and Stan Silverstone, a British psychoanalyst. He was adopted by a secular Jewish family, Louis Melamed, a Manhattan television producer, and his wife, Syma (Krichefsky) Melamed, a sometime actress and housewife. His biological father was a relative of the prominent Adler acting family, including Luther and Stella Adler. He attended the Hunter College Elementary School, a primary school for gifted children, and Riverdale Country School.

His father worked with the TV pioneer Nat Hiken on such shows as Car 54, Where Are You? and The Phil Silvers Show. When he was sixteen, his family had financial difficulties, and was forced to move to Hollywood, Florida. Melamed has said that he was raised in a non-believer Jewish family who never went to synagogue, except to attend a cousin's bar mitzvah. When he was asked if he wanted to attend Hebrew school, he said no, and thus had no religious training. However, he credits his non-religious upbringing as helping him to develop a belief in God later in life, as he had no "forced dogma to overcome".

== Career ==
=== Early career ===
He began his theatrical training at Hampshire College, where he worked with (and was heavily influenced by) Tina Packer, John Guare, Jean-Claude van Itallie, and members of The Living Theatre. Melamed then entered the Yale School of Drama. At Yale, he was a Samuel F. B. Morse College Graduate Fellow. He was also a nominee for the Irene Ryan Award, a prize conferred upon the most promising young actors in the United States. While still at Yale, he was an instructor at the well-known performing arts camp, Stagedoor Manor. After his training, he appeared on stage with several resident theatre companies, including The Guthrie Theater, the John F. Kennedy Center for the Performing Arts, The Yale Repertory Theater, and on Broadway in the Tony Award-winning Amadeus. Following Amadeus, Melamed entered what he called "a period of personal darkness", during which he effectively stopped acting on stage. At the same time, with an insider's understanding of the industry and assistance from his agent, he became established as a voice actor, and continued to do film work.

Melamed's voice became a familiar presence on television, serving as the sound of the Olympics, Mercedes-Benz, CBS Sports, USA Network, the Super Bowl, and numerous commercials and television programs. He became known within the industry as a voice actor, appearing in the Grand Theft Auto series, and dubbing several actors' entire performances in films.

Melamed's feature film debut was in Marshall Brickman's 1983 romantic comedy, Lovesick, starring Dudley Moore and Elizabeth McGovern. Melamed's second film was Woody Allen's comedy-drama Hannah and Her Sisters (1986). In addition, Melamed has prolifically appeared in other Allen films. He has appeared in more Allen movies than any other actor besides Diane Keaton and Mia Farrow (and Allen himself). He has appeared in Radio Days (1987), Another Woman (1988), Crimes and Misdemeanors (1989), Shadows and Fog (1991), Husbands and Wives (1992), and Hollywood Ending (2000). During the 1980s Melamed played significant supporting roles in Roland Joffé's religious epic The Mission (1986) and Elaine May's comedy Ishtar (1987). Also in 1987, he appeared in Peter Yates' legal mystery thriller Suspect (1987) starring Cher, Dennis Quaid, and Liam Neeson as well as the romantic comedy The Pick-up Artist starring Robert Downey Jr. and Molly Ringwald. The following year he appeared in The Good Mother (1988), opposite Diane Keaton and Liam Neeson.

=== 2010s ===
Melamed became widely known for his portrayal of "sensitive" villain Sy Ableman in Joel and Ethan Coen's 2009 film A Serious Man, which was nominated for Best Picture at the 2010 Academy Awards. About that character, Film Confessional said, "Sy Ableman is as great a contemporary movie villain as The Joker, Hans Landa, or Anton Chigurh.... The character Fred Melamed contrives is the year's most brilliant force of destruction." For his performance in A Serious Man, Melamed, along with the Coen brothers, and the film's ensemble and casting directors won Film Independent's Independent Spirit Robert Altman Award. New York magazine listed Melamed's work as among the Best Performances of the Decade, and Empire called Sy Ableman "One of The Best Coen Bros. Characters of All Time". Several leading U.S. critics, including A. O. Scott of The New York Times, Michael Phillips of the Chicago Tribune, and Roger Ebert all said his performance was worthy of Academy Award nomination.

On television, Melamed starred with Maria Bamford in the Netflix comedy Lady Dynamite, on FX's Emmy Award-winning Fargo, Hulu's Golden Globe Award-nominated Casual, the Fox comedy New Girl, and Verizon Go90's sports send-up Now We're Talking. He is a present or past recurring guest star on USA Network's Benched, Showtime's House of Lies, HBO's Girls, Childrens Hospital, Blunt Talk, FX's Married, and Trial & Error. In previous seasons, he played Larry David's smug psychiatrist, Dr. Arthur Thurgood, on Curb Your Enthusiasm, tough-guy jurist Judge Alan Karpman on The Good Wife, and played himself in the CBS situation comedy The Crazy Ones with Robin Williams and Sarah Michelle Gellar. In 2017, he appeared as a special guest star in the acclaimed Fargo episode "The Law of Non-Contradiction". He also appeared in 2 episodes of Brooklyn Nine-Nine as fantasy author D.C. Parlov.

Melamed appeared in the Sundance film Lemon (2017), a collaboration with Brett Gelman and Janicza Bravo, Brawl in Cell Block 99 opposite Vince Vaughn, Sean McGinly's Silver Lake, which he starred in with Martin Starr, and Dragged Across Concrete. Melamed had previously starred as Sam in Lake Bell's In a World..., winner of the Waldo Salt Screenwriting Award at the Sundance Film Festival, opposite Kurt Russell and Richard Jenkins in Bone Tomahawk, and re-teamed with the Coen brothers and co-stars George Clooney, Tilda Swinton, and Ralph Fiennes in Hail, Caesar! (2016). Prior to that, he had starred in Get On Up (2014), a bio-pic about the life of James Brown, and opposite Elliott Gould, as auteur/director Bob Wilson, in Fred Won't Move Out, a film about the decline of a stubborn patriarch and his family. Other 2010s appearances included The Dictator (2012), with Sacha Baron Cohen and Sir Ben Kingsley, where Melamed appeared in a cameo as the Director of the dictator's Nuclear Weapons Program, and Some Kind of Beautiful, where Melamed played a villain, opposite Pierce Brosnan and Jessica Alba.

On Broadway in 2011, after a long hiatus from the theatre, Melamed originated the roles of The Father in Ethan Coen's Talking Cure, and Thomas Moran in Elaine May's George Is Dead, two of the one-act plays that comprised Relatively Speaking. Subsequently, Melamed took on the role of Vanya in the Guild Hall production of Uncle Vanya, about which The New York Times said he gave "an excellent (...) multi-layered performance (...) Mr. Melamed easily inhabits the comic, awkward lover, but also brings out Vanya's vast loneliness".

As a writer, he has produced screenplays including Girl of the Perfume River, A Jones for Gash, The Asshat Project, and is currently at work on a long-form, television version of The Preservationist, a fictional drama inspired by the case of Melamed's college friend, Edward Forbes Smiley III, a renowned cartographic expert and dealer, who admitted to having been the most brazen and prolific map thief of all time.

In 2019, Melamed acted in the crime thriller Lying and Stealing alongside Theo James and Emily Ratajkowski. The film was a modest critical success with Dennis Harvey of Variety writing, "Lying and Stealing manages to be a retro escapist pleasure — one whose cleverness might actually have been muffled by flashier surface assets."

=== 2020s ===
Melamed joined the Marvel Cinematic Universe in WandaVision as Arthur Hart, Vision's boss. In 2020 he appeared in Emma Seligman's directorial debut Shiva Baby. The film premiered at the Toronto International Film Festival and received critical acclaim. The following year he appeared in Nikole Beckwith's pregnancy comedy Together Together starring Ed Helms, and Patti Harrison. The film also received critical plaudits. In 2021, Melamed was named by a host of prominent critics and film professionals in Vulture and New York Magazine as one of "The 32 Greatest Character Actors Working Today".

== Personal life ==
After living in the Hamptons hamlet of Montauk, New York, for many years, Melamed moved with his wife, Leslee, and twin sons to Los Angeles in 2013. Both of the Melamed children were diagnosed with autism and he and his wife have been involved in advocacy for persons living with autism spectrum disorder and their families. Melamed and his wife divorced in 2021.

== Filmography ==
=== Film ===
Year	Title	Role	Notes
1983	Lovesick	Psychoanalyst	
1986	Hannah and Her Sisters	Dr. Grey	
1986	The Mission	Cabeza	Voice; special thanks
1986	The Manhattan Project	Assay Technician	
1987	Radio Days	Bradley	Uncredited
1987	Ishtar	The Caid of Assari	
1987	The Pick-up Artist	George	
1987	Suspect	Morty Rosenthal	
1988	Sticky Fingers	The Cop	Voice; Uncredited
1988	The Good Mother	Dr. Payne	
1988	Another Woman	Engagement Party Guest / Patient	Voices
1989	Crimes and Misdemeanors	The Dean	Uncredited
1991	Shadows and Fog	Undesirables Onlooker	
1992	Husbands and Wives	Mel	Uncredited
2002	Hollywood Ending	Pappas	
2009	A Serious Man	Sy Ableman	
2011	Interpersonal Exopolitics	Hank	Short film
2012	The Dictator	Head Nuclear Scientist	
2012	Fred Won't Move Out	Bob	
2013	In a World...	Sam	
2013	Hair Brained	Benny Greenberg	
2013	Blumenthal	Jimmy Basmati	
2014	Get On Up	Syd Nathan	
2014	Adult Beginners	Story Book Reader	Voice
2014	Some Kind of Beautiful	Victor Piggott	
2015	Raise the ToyGantic	Irving Goldbath	Short film
2015	You Are Whole	Norman	Short film
2015	Bone Tomahawk	Clarence	
2015	The Dazzling Darling Sisters	Leo Reznik	Short film
2016	Hail, Caesar!	Communist Writer	
2016	Passengers	Observatory	Voice
2016	Kid Gambled	The Repair Man	Short film
2017	Lemon	Howard	
2017	Chicanery	Arthur Schekner	
2017	Brawl in Cell Block 99	Mr. Irving	
2018	The Spy Who Dumped Me	Roger	
2018	Silver Lake	Howard	
2018	Dragged Across Concrete	Mr. Edmington	
2018	Killer Black	RK Sherwood	Short film
2019	Lying and Stealing	Dimitri	
2019	The Vigil	Dr. Kohlberg	
2020	Shiva Baby	Joel	
2021	Together Together	Marty	
2021	Barking Mad	Diego Fiesta	
2021	Rumble	The Mayor	Voice
2022	Diary of a Spy	James	
2023	Cat Person	Dr. Resnick	
2023	Peak Season	George Friedman	
2023	Fuzzy Head	The Quadruped	
2024	Junk	Augustus	
2025	Easy's Waltz	Roger	
2025	Don't Trip	Scott Lefkowitz	
2026	Gail Daughtry and the Celebrity Sex Pass	Frank	
2026	Father Joe	TBA	
TBA	The Bookie & the Bruiser	Luca Cavicci	Post-production

=== Television ===
Year	Title	Role	Notes
1981–1982	One Life to Live	Alberto Cervantes	Soap opera
1989	Another World	Crazed Homeless Man	1 episode
1990	America Tonight	Announcer	Voice
1991–1993	Silk Stalkings	Announcer	Voice; 54 episodes
1992–1996	FTL Newsfeed	The Alien Presence	Voice
1998–2003	The NFL Today	Announcer	Voice
2000–2001	Courage the Cowardly Dog	The Magic Tree of Nowhere; Spirit of the Harvest Moon; Various characters	Voice; 12 episodes
2005	Wonder Pets!	The Magician	Voice; Episode: "The Amazing Ollie"
2010	Law & Order	Judge Bertram Hill	Episode: "Steel-Eyed Death"
2010	Law & Order: Special Victims Unit	Dan Goldberg	Episode: "Merchandise"
2011	Curb Your Enthusiasm	Dr. Thurgood	Episode: "Mister Softee"
2011–2014	The Good Wife	Judge Alan Karpman	3 episodes
2012	30 Rock	Jack	Voice; Episode: "There's No I in America"
2013	Two Wrongs	Steven	Pilot
2013–2014	The Crazy Ones	Himself	2 episodes
2014	Benched	Judge Nelson	5 episodes
2014	Superior Living	Marty	Voice; Pilot
2015	Girls	Avi Mensusen	Episode: "Tad & Loreen & Avi & Shanaz"
2015	House of Lies	Harvey Oberholt	4 episodes
2015	Childrens Hospital	Leonard Hillman	Episode: "With Great Power..."
2015	Married	Professor Donald Holt	Episode: "1997"
2015–2016	Blunt Talk	Dr. Mendelson	3 episodes
2015–2018	Casual	Charles Cole	8 episodes
2016	New Girl	J. Cronkite Valley-Forge	3 episodes
2016	The Detour	Conquistadors' Announcer	Voice; Episode: "The Restaurant"
2016–2017	Lady Dynamite	Bruce Ben-Bacharach	20 episodes
2016–2017	Brooklyn Nine-Nine	D.C. Parlov	2 episodes
2017	Trial & Error	Howard Mankiewicz	2 episodes
2017	Fargo	Howard Zimmerman	Episode: "The Law of Non-Contradiction"
2017–2018	Adventure Time	Gumbald	Voice; 7 episodes
2018	Life in Pieces	Dr. Dave Collins	Episode: "Parents Ancestry Coupon Chaperone"
2018	Please Understand Me	Dr. Rick	Episode: "Dr. Rick"
2018–2020	Superstore	Richard Simms	2 episodes
2019	Black Monday	Not Michael Milken #2	Episode: "Not the Predator's Ball"
2019	Summer Camp Island	Monk Receptionist; Additional characters	Voice; Episode: "Radio Silence"
2019	Room 104	Narrator	Voice; Episode: "Drywall Guys"
2019	The Morning Show	Neal Altman	2 episodes
2020	Medical Police	Dr. Richard Waters	6 episodes
2020–2021	Viral Vignettes	Neal	3 episodes
2021	WandaVision	Todd Davis / "Arthur Hart"	Episode: "Filmed Before a Live Studio Audience"
2021	Impeachment: American Crime Story	Bill Ginsburg	3 episodes
2021	The Harper House	Roderick Shipdown	Voice; Episode: "Making the Lie Real"
2021	F Is for Family	Dr. Erwin Goldman	Voice; 5 episodes
2022–2023	Barry	Tom Posorro	9 episodes
2022	The Mysterious Benedict Society	Captain Noland	2 episodes
2022	Reboot	Alan	5 episodes
2023	The Boss Baby: Back in the Crib	Russ Tisdale	Voice; 4 episodes
2024	Clipped	Scaramouche	Episode: "Winning Ugly"
2024	Solar Opposites	The Supreme Adjudicator	Voice; Episode: "The Clervixian Dinner Helmets"
2024	Doctor Odyssey	Jerry Manafort	Episode: "Quackers"
2025	Sausage Party: Foodtopia	Baked Bean Cans	Voice; episode: "Twelfth Course"
2026	Life, Larry and the Pursuit of Unhappiness	William Henry Harrison	Episode: "Lawrence"
2026	The Terrors of Jordan Mendoza	Judge Hamilton	Episode: "Had This Crazy Dream"

=== Theatre ===
Year	Title	Role	Playwright	Venue
1981–1983	Amadeus	Priest; Count Orsini-Rosenberg	Peter Shaffer	Broadhurst Theatre, Broadway
2011	Relatively Speaking	The Father	Woody Allen; Elaine May; Ethan Coen	Brooks Atkinson Theatre, Broadway
2012	Uncle Vanya	Vanya	Anton Chekhov	John Drew Theatre at Guild Hall

=== Video games ===
Year	Title	Voice role	Notes
1998–2003	NCAA Football series	Announcer	
1999	The Multipath Adventures of Superman	Lex Luthor	
2004	Grand Theft Auto: San Andreas	Cris Formage	
2013	Grand Theft Auto V	Cris Formage	
2013	Grand Theft Auto Online	Cris Formage	
2014	Diablo III: Reaper of Souls	Male Atarias	
2018	Adventure Time: Pirates of the Enchiridion	Gumbald	
2018	Fallout 76	Senator Joel Chambers, Red	Nuclear Winter DLC
2026	High on Life 2	The Blue Wizard	

== Awards and nominations ==
Year	Award	Category	Nominated work	Result	Ref.
2009	Village Voice Film Poll	Best Supporting Actor	A Serious Man	Nominated	
2009	Gotham Awards	Best Ensemble Performance	A Serious Man	Nominated	
2009	Boston Society of Film Critics	Best Ensemble Cast	A Serious Man	Nominated	
2010	Independent Spirit Awards	Robert Altman Award	A Serious Man	Won	
2014	Voice Awards	Lifetime Achievement Award	Body of work	Won	
2021	Studio City Film Festival	Best Ensemble Cast	Barking Mad	Won	
2021	New York International Film Festival	Best Acting (Duo)	Jack's Inferno	Won	
2022	Crown Point International Film Festival	Best Ensemble	Viral Vignettes	Won	
2023	Riverside International Film Festival	Best Ensemble	Deadly Draw	Won	
2023	Vegas Movie Awards	Best Supporting Actor	Deadly Draw	Won	
2024	Screen Actors Guild Awards	Outstanding Performance by an Ensemble in a Comedy Series	Barry	Nominated	
