= Hug Chickenpenny: The Panegyric of an Anomalous Child =

Novel by S. Craig Zahler

- First edition
- Author: S. Craig Zahler
- Language: English
- Genre: Gothic fiction Drama; Horror fiction
- Publisher: Cinestate
- Publication date: 23 January 2018
- Publication place: United States
- Media type: Print (paperback)
- Pages: 256
- ISBN: 978-1-946487-00-1

Hug Chickenpenny: The Panegyric of an Anomalous Child is a 2018 American gothic horror novel written by S. Craig Zahler. Published by Cinestate as the inaugural entry in their publishing imprint, the novel follows the life of the titular protagonist, an orphan child born with several deformities.

== Background ==
Zahler said in an interview that the idea of the novel has existed with him for 21 years. He calls it his "single favorite piece" out of all his work; he further said that the novel has "probably more elements of horror, with intimations of supernatural and wondering about Hug’s parentage and some longer horror sequences, even if the end result isn’t incredibly violent in any spot."

== Reception ==
Kirkus Reviews said that the novel's prose is "solid, and the dialogue in particular shines, feeling natural without betraying the gothic style of the story." Emily Sears of Birth.Movies.Death. wrote: "While it's likely not a great bedtime story for most young readers, those with an interest in horror movies and more macabre fairy tales may be ready for this book." Michele Galgan of Diabolique called the novel "refreshing", adding that it is "different from anything I’ve read — it’s certainly different from Zahler’s other work — and as someone who sees a lot of the same tropes consistently."

Leah Pickett of Dallas Observer called it "a Dickensian fable with elements of gothic horror and Christian apologia" and "a daring, evocative work that defies categorization." A reviewer from Booklist noted that readers will "find themselves pulling for the lovable Hug and for a happy ending to Zahler’s unusual and unusually appealing tale." Midwest Book Review called it "an exceptional, original, and inherently fascinating read from beginning to end."

== Film adaptation ==
During the launch of the novel, it was announced that Zahler will work with The Jim Henson Company to adapt it for a feature film.
