= Lying and Stealing =

- Theatrical release poster
- Directed by: Matt Aselton
- Written by: Matt Aselton; Adam Nagata
- Produced by: Mohamed AlRafi; Naomi Despres; Michael Costigan
- Starring: Theo James; Emily Ratajkowski; Fred Melamed; Ebon Moss-Bachrach; Isiah Whitlock Jr.; Evan Handler; Julia Haart
- Cinematography: Corey Walter
- Edited by: Geoff Hounsell
- Music by: Sonya Belousova; Giona Ostinelli
- Production companies: Cota Films; 50 Degrees Entertainment; Voltage Pictures
- Distributed by: Vertical Entertainment; DirecTV Cinema
- Release date: July 12, 2019
- Country: United States
- Language: English
- Box office: $641,509

Lying and Stealing is a 2019 American crime drama film, directed by Matt Aselton from a screenplay by Aselton and Adam Nagata. It stars Theo James, Emily Ratajkowski, Fred Melamed, Ebon Moss-Bachrach, Isiah Whitlock Jr. and Evan Handler.

It was released on July 12, 2019, by Vertical Entertainment.

== Plot ==
Ivan Warding is a thief who specializes in stealing art from the elite of Los Angeles. He is obliged to a crime boss and wants to get out of the art heist business. Elyse Tibaldi is an in-debt aspiring actress who is also a con-woman. Elyse is an actress who has fallen out of favor since she accepted a producer's invitation to his room, where she stole his wife's necklace worth $250,000 and sold it for $50,000. Together they plot one last heist and con that will set both free from their obligations.

Ivan wants to stop stealing art objects, but Dimitri explains after every job that Ivan needs one more to pay off his father's debts. During the job to steal the self-portrait of Hitler, he keeps the painting hidden because the FBI is following him. Dimitri threatens Ivan and lets his flat be searched for the painting without success.

Lyman Wilkers from the FBI offers Ivan a deal if he betrays Dimitri. Instead, Ivan, his brother Ray and Elyse plan to get rid of Dimitri. Elyse meets Dimitri in a bar, pretends to be interested in him and they drive to Dimitri's home with Ray as their driver. Ray mixes the wine with cocaine, which Dimitri cannot consume due to his high blood pressure and dies. The case is written off as self-inflicted, the artworks are returned to their owners except for the first painting stolen by Ivan's father, which Ivan takes with him.

In the end, Ivan gives the producer the money for the stolen necklace so that Elyse can get jobs again.

== Cast ==
- Theo James as Ivan Warding
- Emily Ratajkowski as Elyse Tibaldi
- Fred Melamed as Dimitri Maropakis
- Ebon Moss-Bachrach as Ray Warding
- Isiah Whitlock Jr. as Lyman Wilkers
- Evan Handler as Eric Maropakis
- John Gatins as Aton Eisenstadt
- Fernanda Andrade as Mary Bertring
- Bob Stephenson as Mr. Oklahoma
- Keith Powell as Mike Williams
- Julia Haart as Foxy

== Production ==
In November 2017, it was announced Theo James, Emily Ratajkowski, Fred Melamed, Ebon Moss-Bachrach, Isiah Whitlock Jr., Evan Handler and John Gatins joined the cast of the film, with Matt Aseleton directing from a screenplay he wrote alongside Adam Nagata.

== Release ==
In January 2019, Vertical Entertainment and DirecTV Cinema acquired distribution rights to the film. It was released on July 12, 2019.

=== Critical response ===
On Rotten Tomatoes the film has an approval rating of 58% based on 12 reviews, with an average rating of 6/10. On Metacritic, the film has a score of 50 out of 100, based on 6 critics, indicating "mixed or average" reviews.

Dennis Harvey of Variety magazine wrote: "Yet even given its budgetary limits and second-tier cast, 'Lying and Stealing' manages to be a retro escapist pleasure — one whose cleverness might actually have been muffled by flashier surface assets."
