= Saturn Award for Best Thriller Film =

American film award

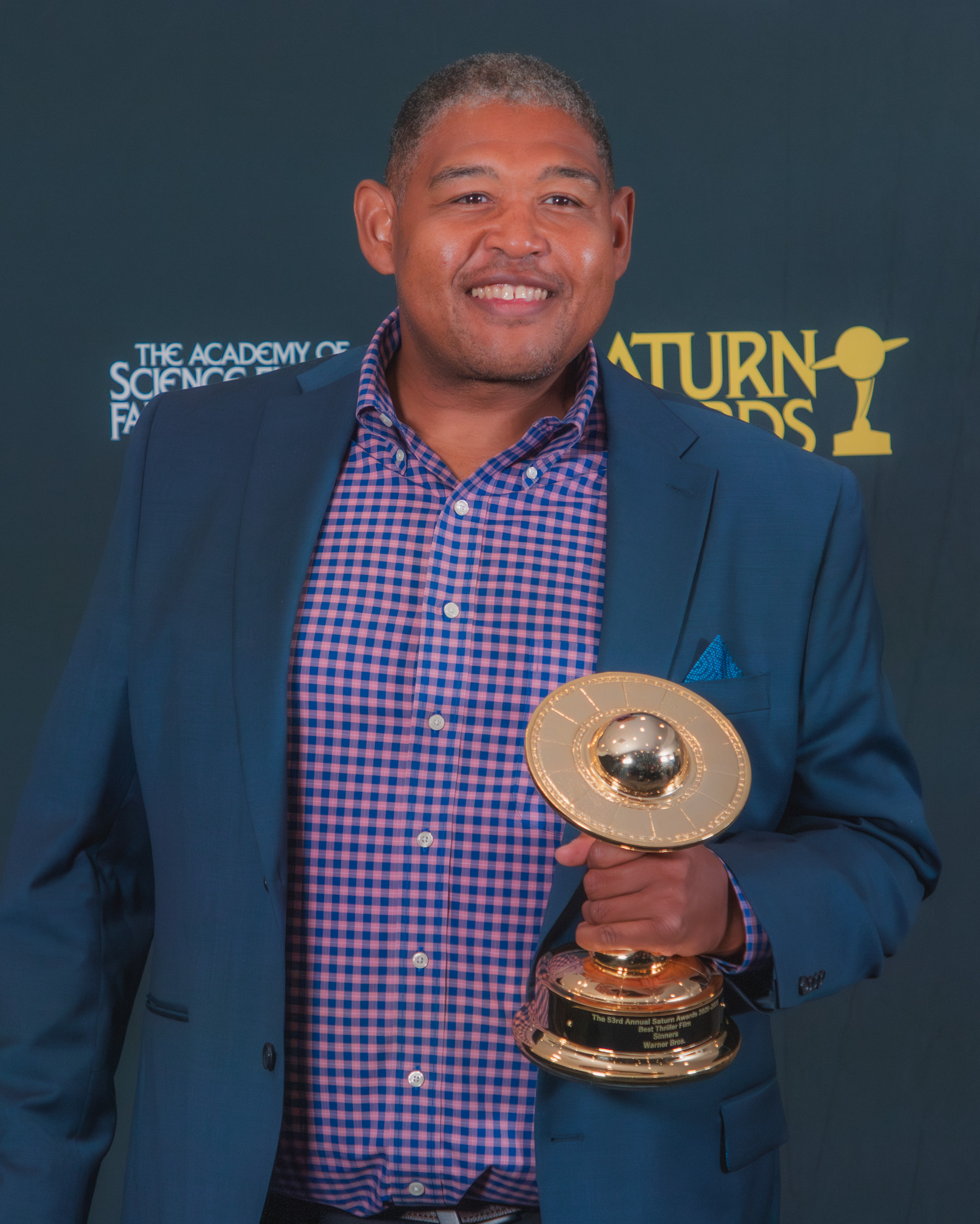
- The 2024/2025 recipient for Sinners
- Awarded for: Best motion picture of the year in the thriller genre
- Country: United States
- Presented by: Academy of Science Fiction, Fantasy and Horror Films
- First award: 2013
- Currently held by: Sinners (2024/2025)
- Website: www.saturnawards.org

The Saturn Award for Best Thriller Film is an award presented to the best film in the thriller genre by the Academy of Science Fiction, Fantasy and Horror Films.

The Saturn Awards originally recognized thriller films with the Best Action, Adventure or Thriller Film award from 1994 to 2010, and then with the award for Best Horror or Thriller Film. When Best Horror or Thriller Film was reverted to its previous form as Best Horror Film in 2013, the award for Best Thriller Film was created.

== Winners and nominees ==
=== 2010s ===
Year	Film
2013 (40th)	World War Z
2013 (40th)	The Call
2013 (40th)	The East
2013 (40th)	Now You See Me
2013 (40th)	The Place Beyond the Pines
2013 (40th)	Prisoners
2014 (41st)	Gone Girl
2014 (41st)	American Sniper
2014 (41st)	The Equalizer
2014 (41st)	The Guest
2014 (41st)	The Imitation Game
2014 (41st)	Nightcrawler
2015 (42nd)	Bridge of Spies
2015 (42nd)	Black Mass
2015 (42nd)	The Gift
2015 (42nd)	The Hateful Eight
2015 (42nd)	Mr. Holmes
2015 (42nd)	Sicario
2016 (43rd)	10 Cloverfield Lane
2016 (43rd)	The Accountant
2016 (43rd)	The Girl on the Train
2016 (43rd)	Hell or High Water
2016 (43rd)	Jason Bourne
2016 (43rd)	The Shallows
2016 (43rd)	Split
2017 (44th)	Three Billboards Outside Ebbing, Missouri
2017 (44th)	Brawl in Cell Block 99
2017 (44th)	Murder on the Orient Express
2017 (44th)	The Post
2017 (44th)	Suburbicon
2017 (44th)	Wind River
2018/2019 (45th)	Bad Times at the El Royale
2018/2019 (45th)	Bad Samaritan
2018/2019 (45th)	Destroyer
2018/2019 (45th)	Dragged Across Concrete
2018/2019 (45th)	Greta
2018/2019 (45th)	Ma
2018/2019 (45th)	Searching
2019/2020 (46th)	Knives Out
2019/2020 (46th)	Da 5 Bloods
2019/2020 (46th)	The Good Liar
2019/2020 (46th)	The Irishman
2019/2020 (46th)	Mank
2019/2020 (46th)	Uncut Gems

=== 2020s ===
Year	Film
2021/2022 (50th)	Nightmare Alley
2021/2022 (50th)	Ambulance
2021/2022 (50th)	The Northman
2021/2022 (50th)	Old
2021/2022 (50th)	The Outfit
2021/2022 (50th)	Pig
2022/2023 (51st)	Oppenheimer
2022/2023 (51st)	Don't Worry Darling
2022/2023 (51st)	Glass Onion: A Knives Out Mystery
2022/2023 (51st)	The Lesson
2022/2023 (51st)	The Menu
2022/2023 (51st)	Knock at the Cabin
2023/2024 (52nd)	Strange Darling
2023/2024 (52nd)	Blink Twice
2023/2024 (52nd)	Civil War
2023/2024 (52nd)	Saltburn
2023/2024 (52nd)	Speak No Evil
2023/2024 (52nd)	Wolfs
2024/2025 (53rd)	Sinners
2024/2025 (53rd)	Highest 2 Lowest
2024/2025 (53rd)	The Housemaid
2024/2025 (53rd)	The Long Walk
2024/2025 (53rd)	Marty Supreme
2024/2025 (53rd)	Wake Up Dead Man
