= Geno Segers =

American actor

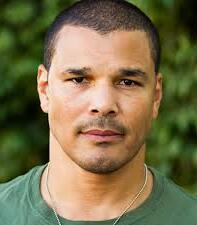
- Segers in 2014
- Born: Lonnie G. Segers Jr. Winston-Salem, North Carolina, U.S.
- Occupation: Actor
- Years active: 2004–present
- Known for: Pair of Kings; Fort Boyard: Ultimate Challenge; Banshee
- Rugby league career

Playing information
Representative
Years	Team	Pld	T	G	FG	P
1995	United States	2
- Website: genosegers.com

Lonnie G. "Geno" Segers Jr. is an American actor known for his roles as Chayton Littlestone in the Cinemax original series Banshee, Dwayne in NBC's Perfect Harmony, Mason Makoola in the Disney XD television series Pair of Kings, Kincaid on MTV's Teen Wolf, and also as co-host of Fort Boyard: Ultimate Challenge for two seasons.

== Early life ==
Segers was an American football player, wrestler, and track athlete in high school and college. He played American football at Western Carolina University. Segers then played professional rugby league. He played in the American National Rugby League and won two caps for United States national rugby league team against Wales national rugby league team in 1995. From there, he moved to New Zealand to play for the Richmond Rovers rugby league team.

== Career ==
At the suggestion of a friend, Segers auditioned for voice ads at a New Zealand radio station. His natural bass tone earned him a lot of attention, and caught the attention of an agent that led Segers to be cast as Mufasa in the Australian production of The Lion King. He went on to star in the American and Chinese productions as well.

In 2010, Segers gained a main role on Pair of Kings as Mason Makoola.

In 2015, Segers appeared in the film Bone Tomahawk, where he starred as a major antagonist called "Boar Tusk", a savage and mute member of an extremely violent cannibalistic mute clan, called the "Troglodytes".

In 2018, Segers recurred on the TV series Knight Squad as the main villain Ryker. He reprised this role in a crossover episode of Henry Danger.

Segers voices Hekarro, Leader of the Tenakth, in Horizon Forbidden West.

On September 1, 2026, Segers was planned to make his Broadway debut as Hades in the Broadway production of Hadestown. It has since been announced that he will no longer be joining the production due to alleged past transphobic remarks. As a result, he was replaced by Ben Davis.

== Filmography ==
=== Film ===
Year	Title	Role	Note
2015	Bone Tomahawk	Boar Tusks	
2017	Brawl in Cell Block 99	Roman	
2018	Uncharted Live Action Fan Film	Diego	
2018	Game Over, Man!	Sal	
2023	Journey to Bethlehem	Balthazar	
2024	Thelma the Unicorn	Male Talent Judge, Additional voices	

=== Television ===
Year	Title	Role	Note
2009	White Collar	Aimes' Bodyguard	Episode: "Flip of the Coin"
2011–2012	Fort Boyard: Ultimate Challenge	Himself	Seasons 1-2
2010–2013	Pair of Kings	Mason Makoola	Main Role; 52 episodes
2011	Zeke & Luther	Stan the agent	Episode: "Zeke, Luther, and Kojo Strikes Gold"
2014	Teen Wolf	Kincaid	Season 3 Episode 17 & 20
2014	Castle	Ernest	Episode: "Last Action Hero"
2014–2015	Banshee	Chayton Littlestone	Main cast, 12 episodes
2015	Longmire	Clavin Blackwolf	Season 4 Ep. 10
2016	Dusk Till Dawn	General Tatuaje	Season 3 Ep. 8
2017	Elementary	Fetu	Season 6 Ep. 3
2018	Yellowstone	Danny Trudeau	Season 1 Ep 3
2018–2019	Knight Squad	Ryker	3 episodes
2018	Stuck in the Middle	The Businessman	Episode: "Stuck Wrestling Feelings"
2018	Voltron: Legendary Defender	Gyrgan (voice)	3 episodes
2019	Henry Danger	Ryker	Episode: "Knight & Danger"
2019–2020	Perfect Harmony	Dwayne	Main cast, 13 episodes
2023	My Dad the Bounty Hunter	Alien Bouncer, Fratty Alien Bro (voices)	Episode: "Old Friends"
2025	The Thundermans: Undercover	High Tide	Episode: "Tide and Prejudice"

=== Video games ===
Year	Title	Role	Note
2017	LawBreakers	Cronos	
2017	Fortnite	Galactus	
2022	Horizon: Forbidden West	Hekarro	
