= Brawl in Cell Block 99 =

2017 American film by S. Craig Zahler

- Theatrical release poster
- Directed by: S. Craig Zahler
- Written by: S. Craig Zahler
- Produced by: Jack Heller; Dallas Sonnier
- Starring: Vince Vaughn; Jennifer Carpenter; Marc Blucas; Mustafa Shakir; Dion Mucciacito; Geno Segers; Thomas Guiry; Udo Kier; Don Johnson
- Cinematography: Benji Bakshi
- Edited by: Greg D'Auria
- Music by: Jeff Herriott; S. Craig Zahler
- Production companies: Assemble Media; Cinestate; Caliber Media Company; Realmbuilders Productions; XYZ Films
- Distributed by: RLJE Films
- Release dates: September 2, 2017 (Venice); October 6, 2017 (United States)
- Running time: 132 minutes
- Country: United States
- Language: English
- Budget: $4 million
- Box office: $79,208

Brawl in Cell Block 99 is a 2017 American prison film written and directed by S. Craig Zahler and starring Vince Vaughn, Jennifer Carpenter, Marc Blucas, Mustafa Shakir, Dion Mucciacito, Geno Segers, Thomas Guiry, Udo Kier, and Don Johnson. The story follows Bradley Thomas, a drug mule who must kill a man held in a maximum security prison to rescue his pregnant wife from a vengeful drug lord.

Zahler wrote the script of Brawl in Cell Block 99 after watching several prison films, coming up with different elements to add to the genre. He cast Vaughn for his consistency and authenticity, in a break from the comedic roles that Vaughn usually plays. Vaughn exercised and underwent training for the film's action and fighting sequences. Filming took place in Staten Island, New York City, between August and October 2016 under a production budget of $4 million.

The film premiered at the 74th Venice International Film Festival, and was released in theaters, digital HD, and video on demand in October 2017, by RLJE Films. It received positive reviews which praised Vaughn's performance and the film's 1970s exploitation style. The film was named among the year's best films by the Los Angeles Times, The New York Times, and The A.V. Club.

== Plot ==
Bradley Thomas is laid off from his job at an auto repair shop. When he arrives home, he finds a hickey on his wife, Lauren, who admits to an extramarital affair. Bradley orders her inside the house before he violently dismantles her car. He later discusses with Lauren their failing relationship, forgives her, and turns to drug trafficking.

Eighteen months later, Bradley and a pregnant Lauren have adjusted to a better life. Bradley's boss, Gil, introduces him to Eleazar, a new business associate, with a task to pick up a package of crystal meth with two of Eleazar's men. Bradley distrusts one of Eleazar's henchmen, Roman, but accepts the job when Gil offers him three months' paternity leave. During the job, Bradley realizes it is a police trap and orders Eleazar's men to ditch the drugs. Eleazar's men ignore him and exchange fire with the police. Bradley, hesitant, attacks Eleazar's men; one of the men is fatally shot by the police while Roman is incapacitated. The police detain Bradley alive; unwilling to give out names, Bradley is sentenced to seven years in a medium-security prison.

During the night, Eleazar's men kidnap Lauren. In prison, Bradley is visited by the Placid Man, a henchman for Eleazar. The Placid Man commands Bradley to assassinate an inmate who is held in Cell Block 99 at Redleaf, a maximum-security prison. If Bradley refuses, the limbs of his unborn child will be surgically removed and sent to him. Bradley reluctantly accepts and fights guards to be transferred to Redleaf. Bradley meets the authoritarian warden Tuggs, who demeans him and sends Bradley to a dilapidated cell. He learns that Cell Block 99 is for society's most despised criminals. Bradley starts a brawl with other prisoners to be sent to Cell Block 99. After he is reassigned, Bradley learns that his assassination target does not exist.

During the night, a Redleaf guard escorts Bradley to another cell, where Eleazar and his gang, including Roman, are held. They intend to torture Bradley for their amusement throughout his incarceration at Redleaf. Bradley ambushes the guards and brutally kills most of Eleazar's gang. Eleazar calls the doctor to carry out Eleazar's threat and harm Bradley's unborn child. Bradley tortures Eleazar until he calls off the operation. The Placid Man and the doctor follow Eleazar's orders and drive Lauren unharmed to Gil's house. As they drive away, Gil retrieves a hidden rifle and kills the Placid Man. Lauren takes the rifle and shoots the doctor. Gil phones Bradley to inform him that his family is safe and Bradley speaks to Lauren about their unborn child. Bradley then decapitates Eleazar in his cell. Tuggs and his guards emerge and the warden murders Bradley with his revolver.

== Cast ==
- Vince Vaughn as Bradley Thomas
- Jennifer Carpenter as Lauren Thomas, Bradley's wife
- Don Johnson as Warden Tuggs, the warden of Redleaf Prison
- Udo Kier as The Placid Man, a henchman for Eleazar
- Marc Blucas as Gil, Bradley's boss in drug trafficking
- Mustafa Shakir as Andre
- Thomas Guiry as Wilson, a prison guard of Redleaf
- Dion Mucciacito as Eleazar, a drug trafficker and gang leader
- Geno Segers as Roman, a drug runner working for Eleazar
- Willie C. Carpenter as Lefty
- Fred Melamed as Mr. Irving
- Clark Johnson as Detective Watkins
- Pooja Kumar as Denise Pawther
- Tobee Paik as The doctor
- Rob Morgan as Jeremy
- Dan Amboyer as Longman
- Philip Ettinger as Derrick
- Devon Windsor as Jill

== Production ==
=== Development ===
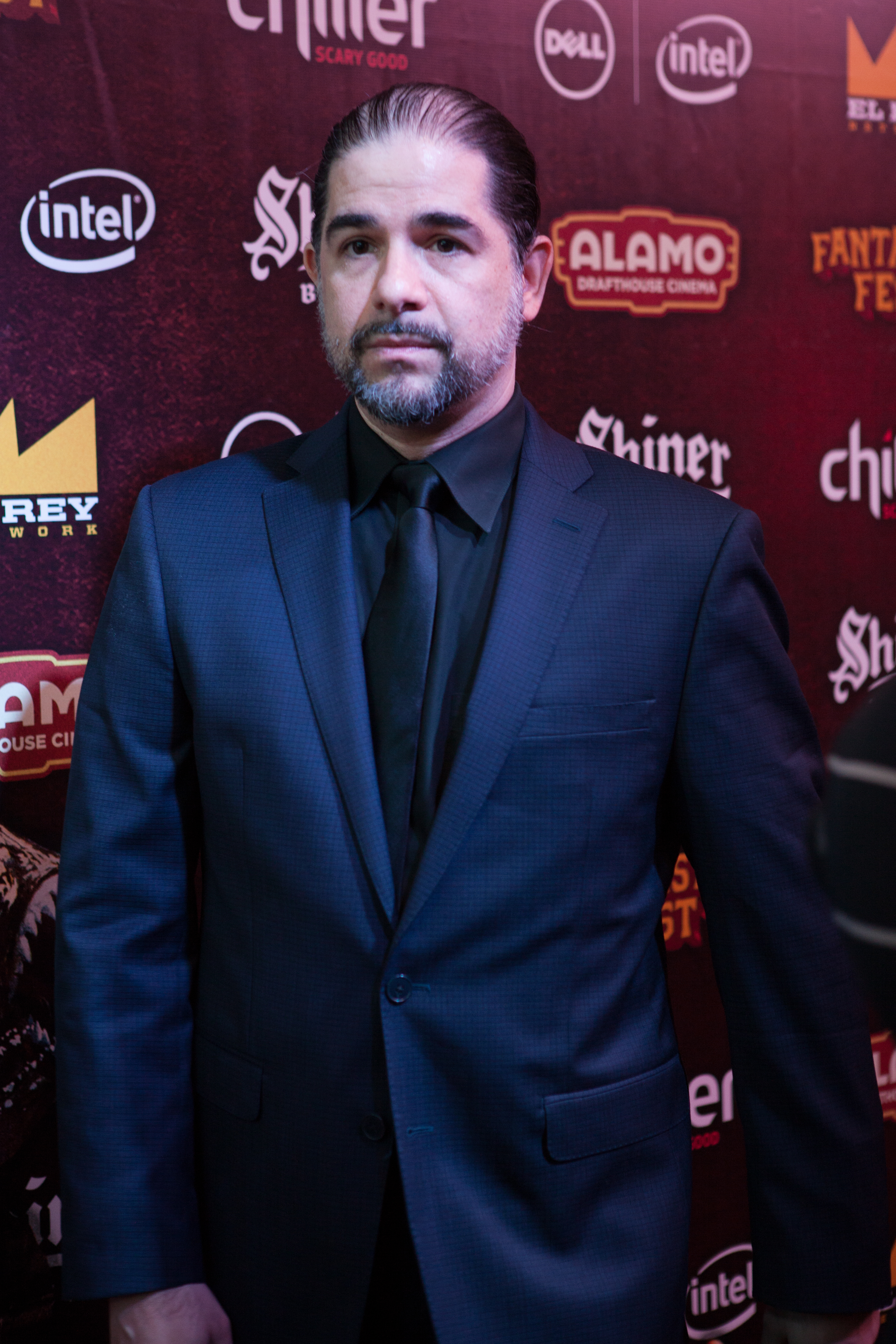
S. Craig Zahler at 2015 Fantastic Fest

S. Craig Zahler wrote the script for Brawl in Cell Block 99 in 2011. He came up with the concept after watching several prison films at the Film Forum in New York City, coming up with different elements to add into the genre. In an interview with The Verge, Zahler explained, "Prison is such a compelling place to set a movie, because you have a bunch of hard-edged dudes confined together, and all of them are going to have interesting backstories".

Zahler named the film Riot in Cell Block 11 (1954) and its director Don Siegel as inspirations. Zahler wrote every moment of graphic violence into the script of Brawl in Cell Block 99, although he wondered if some scenes had gone too far. He chose a long title for the film to be evocative and memorable, like his other films Bone Tomahawk (2015) and Dragged Across Concrete (2018). He castigated one-word movie titles as vague and frustrating; as an example, he contrasted the 2016 film Moonlight compared to the play it was based on, In Moonlight Black Boys Look Blue.

Zahler sold the script of Brawl in Cell Block 99 to several producers, but progress stalled until Bone Tomahawk was completed. Jack Heller and Dallas Sonnier brought back the script, allowing Zahler to have full creative control over the film. The budget was $4 million. Heller and Sonnier produced the film as Caliber Media. XYZ Films was the executive producer.

=== Casting ===
For instance, a character closer to this guy is someone like Woody Harrelson. His head is there, his accent is naturally there. I'm a big Woody Harrelson fan, but he would be the normal choice here. When you're trying to make something unique, which I'm trying to do with all my pieces, and I took some guy who'd played a character close to this one before…? I'd lose the unique experience of watching this character, the physicality, the muscle, the very layered internal work. The conflation of all of this stuff yields a character we've never seen before. If Woody Harrelson came in and did this, he would have done an excellent job, the transformation isn't as big. That was the thing with picking Vince, that transformation would be there.

— S. Craig Zahler, Den of Geek, 2017

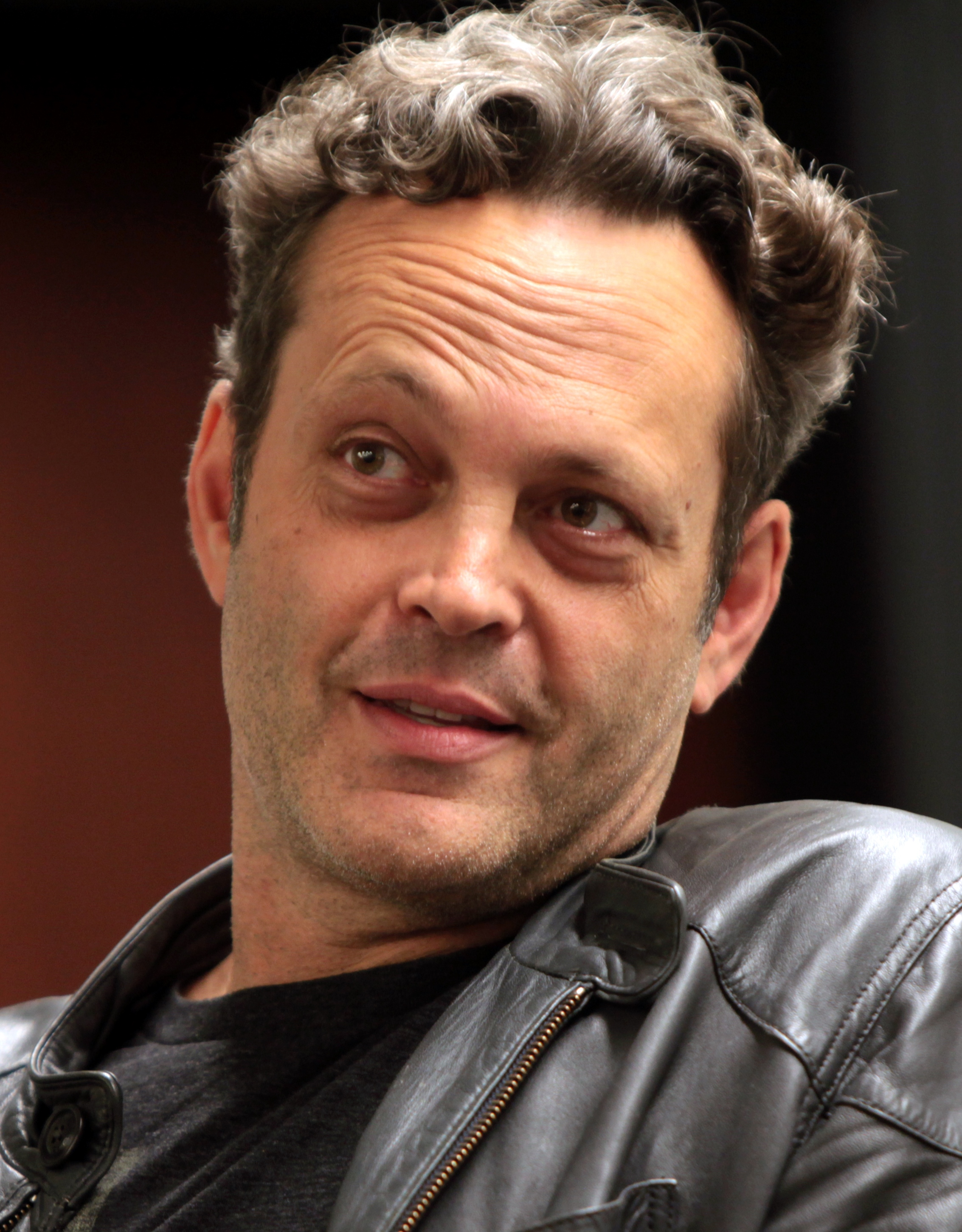
Vince Vaughn, who plays Bradley Thomas

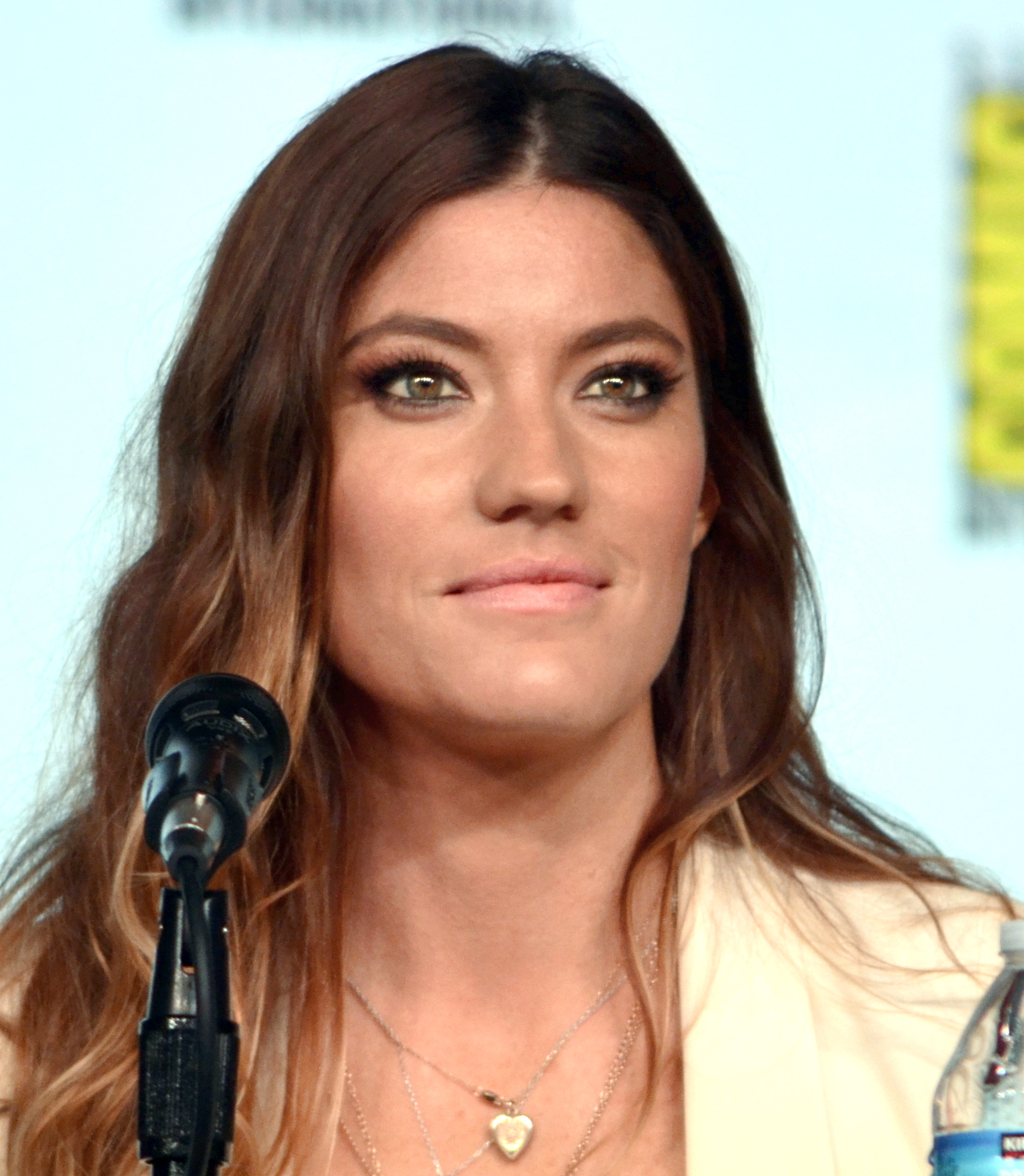
Jennifer Carpenter, who plays Bradley's wife Lauren

On August 17, 2016, Vince Vaughn and Jennifer Carpenter signed in to play the main leads. Carpenter was initially cast as the main female lead of Zahler's Bone Tomahawk, but was not able to appear due to scheduling conflicts. Zahler praised Vaughn's authenticity, engagement, and consistency in films like Swingers (1996), The Cell (2000), Old School (2003), and Hacksaw Ridge (2016). Although Vaughn was mainly known for his comedic roles, Zahler wanted to tap into Vaughn's talent in playing serious roles. Zahler also chose Vaughn for his imposing presence and physical profile as a large man standing at 6 ft 5 in (1.96 m). Zahler remarked: "I knew he was a big guy. I knew if I saw him on the street I wouldn't think that guy's a comedian. I would think that's a menacing looking dude". Vaughn had seen Bone Tomahawk, Zahler's first directed film, and agreed to perform in Brawl in Cell Block 99 after reading its script. "Zahler doesn't write in a genre," Vaughn said. "He takes all of these elements and cross-pollinates them and tells a unique story". Vaughn went through physical exercise to prepare for fighting sequences that are similar to "traditional Hong Kong fight movie sequences". Drew Leary was the fight choreographer.

Vaughn's character Bradley has a cross tattoo on the back of his head, which Vaughn says represents Christianity. Zahler hoped that the cross tattoo would intrigue people to see "this is a Vince Vaughn you've never seen before". Zahler credited Vaughn's boxing and wrestling experience in helping shoot the fight scenes.

Zahler praised Don Johnson, who played Warden Tuggs: "Don does a fantastic job in bringing this character to life as someone who handles different people as an animal handler would handle different animals".

=== Filming ===
Principal photography ran for five weeks from August 15, 2016 to October 17, 2016, on Staten Island, New York City. The shooting schedule was tight, and the film crew shot in multiple locations in the same day. The film crew lost locations during the shoot and looked for new locations during their lunch breaks. Producers Jack Heller and Greg Zuk found one of the shoot locations.

Cinematographer Benji Bakshi, who previously collaborated with Zahler on Bone Tomahawk, worked on Brawl in Cell Block 99. Zahler chose a narrower aspect ratio of 1.85:1 to focus on scenes with one character, rather than the wider 2.35:1 ratio used for the ensemble cast in Bone Tomahawk. Bakshi shot the film with a RED Weapon camera; Zahler disliked the RED Dragon that he used in Bone Tomahawk because it was visually noisier. To make the film more atmospheric, Zahler and Bakshi focused on blue colors in the early parts of the film, and made the tones progressively darker. The third act was "supposed to feel oppressive, with almost a medieval-dungeon feel".

Since Zahler did not want to use computer-generated imagery (CG) in Brawl in Cell Block 99, most of the violence and gore was done as physical special effects. Zahler minimized the use of edits, close-ups, and sound effects to make the violence as realistic and uncomfortable as possible. He explained: "I shoot violence in a really unvarnished way, without all this cinematic frosting, and there's no CG so there isn't that slight off, digital feel. It makes the impact sharper, because it's not how audiences are used to seeing movie violence". The actors rehearsed and performed the fight scenes over multiple takes without stunt doubles, and they risked getting hurt if there was a mistake.

=== Music ===
Brawl in Cell Block 99

Soundtrack album by various artists, Jeff Herriott, S. Craig Zahler
- Released: October 13, 2017
- Genres: Soul, Funk
- Length: 31:10
- Label: Lakeshore Records

The film's soundtrack was composed by Zahler's friend Jeff Herriott, who had worked with Zahler on Bone Tomahawk. Zahler collaborated with artists to compose original songs, such as the rhythm and blues performed by The O'Jays. The music sounds like vintage soul music, using real instruments instead of synthesizers. While original songs feature on the soundtrack, the film has almost no score (musical accompaniment) as Zahler wanted to focus on the acting.

Lakeshore Records released the soundtrack on October 13, 2017 in CD, Digital, and Vinyl formats.

No.	Title	Music	Length
1.	"Give Her a Ride"	Butch Tavares	4:20
2.	"The Letter That Won't Ever Be Sent"	Butch Tavares	3:22
3.	"You Are Yesterday"	Butch Tavares	4:17
4.	"Trumpets of Heaven"	Adi Armour	5:08
5.	"This Lovely Park"	Adi Armour	4:38
6.	"God Bless My Mama"	The O'Jays	4:38
7.	"Buddy's Business"	The O'Jays	4:47
Total length:			31:10

== Release ==
Brawl in Cell Block 99 premiered out of competition at the 74th Venice International Film Festival on September 2, 2017. In the same month, the film screened at the 2017 Toronto International Film Festival and Fantastic Fest. RLJE Films, holder of the North American distribution rights, released the film in theaters on October 6, 2017, and on digital HD and video on demand on October 13, 2017. Brawl in Cell Block 99 grossed $79,000 worldwide.

== Reception ==
=== Critical response ===
Brawl in Cell Block 99 received positive reviews from critics and audiences alike. On Rotten Tomatoes, the film has an approval rating of 90% based on 99 reviews, with an average rating of 7.60/10. The website's critical consensus reads, "Brawl in Cell Block 99 rides a committed Vince Vaughn performance into the brutally violent—and undeniably entertaining—depths of prison-set grindhouse genre fare." On Metacritic, the film has a weighted average score of 79 out of 100, based on 21 critics, indicating "generally favorable" reviews. At the 74th Venice International Film Festival, the film received warm applause from the audience.

Owen Gleiberman of Variety praised the film, calling it a "rare movie that truly evokes the grindhouse '70s" with its "exploitation made with vicious sincerity", a sentiment shared by Eric Kohn of IndieWire. Praise was also given to Vaughn's performance by Richard Roeper of the Chicago Sun-Times, Gleiberman of Variety, and Dan Buffa of KSDK News. Gleiberman described Vaughn's character Bradley as "a big violent sad-eyed baby, and he connects to the audience in the direct emotional way that he has done only rarely since Swingers". Dan Buffa believed the film would help resurrect Vaughn's career after a line of failed films starring him.

=== Accolades ===
The film made year-end best of lists for Newsweek, Los Angeles Times, Collider, The A.V. Club, and others. The picture was a New York Times Critic's Pick and was screened at the Museum of Modern Art, where it was added to the permanent collection.

Brawl in Cell Block 99 was nominated for Best Thriller Film and Best Actor for Vaughn at the 44th Saturn Awards, but lost to Three Billboards Outside Ebbing, Missouri and Mark Hamill for Star Wars: The Last Jedi, respectively.
