= The Seventh Day (2021 film) =

American horror film

- Poster
- Directed by: Justin P. Lange
- Written by: Justin P. Lange
- Produced by: Dallas Sonnier; Chelsea Davenport; Amanda Presmyk; Kimberly Hwang
- Starring: Guy Pearce; Vadhir Derbez; Brady Jenness; Chris Galust; Robin Bartlett; Heath Freeman; Keith David; Stephen Lang
- Cinematography: Nick Remy Matthews
- Edited by: Josh Ethier
- Music by: Gavin Brivik
- Production companies: Voltage Pictures; Swiss Avenue Pictures
- Distributed by: Vertical Entertainment; Redbox Entertainment
- Release date: March 26, 2021 (United States)
- Country: United States
- Language: English
- Box office: $375,921

The Seventh Day is a 2021 American horror film written and directed by Justin P. Lange. It stars Guy Pearce, Vadhir Derbez, Stephen Lang and Keith David.

It was released on March 26, 2021, by Vertical Entertainment and Redbox Entertainment.

== Premise ==
Father Peter, a prestigious exorcist, teams up with Father Daniel, a young and inexperienced priest, on his first day of work. They try to stop the demonic possession of a young boy named Charlie.

While performing the exorcism on Charlie and seeing his arms slowly develop burn marks resembling other exorcisms, Father Daniel realizes that Father Peter is actually possessed and redirects his exorcism prayer towards Peter. In a violent struggle, Father Daniel kills Father Peter with his crucifix. As the demon leaves his body, Peter thanks Daniel before dying.

Father Daniel brings Charlie to the Archibibishop where Charlie undegoes a second successful exorcism. Father Daniel leaves Charlie with the Archbishop, who promises to take care of him. The Archbishop and Father Daniel realize every priest recruit who worked under Father Peter has been possessed by a demon, creating a network of demonic priests that is quite sizable. The Archbishop provides a list of all those priests to Father Daniel who will carry on with those exorcisms. Shown as the first one is Father Dunleavy. Daniel starts his car to begin his mission.

== Cast ==
- Guy Pearce as Father Peter Costello
  - Chris Galust as young Peter Costello
- Vadhir Derbez as Father Daniel Garcia
- Stephen Lang as Archbishop
- Keith David as Father Louis
- Robin Bartlett as Helen
- Brady Jenness as Charlie Giroux
- Tristan Riggs as Nicholas Miller
- Hannah Alline Culwell as Mrs. Miller
- Heath Freeman as Mr. Miller
- Acoryé White as George

== Production ==
On November 6, 2019, it was announced that Guy Pearce signed on to play the lead role in the film. On January 14, 2020, Vadhir Derbez joined the cast. On January 27, 2020, Stephen Lang, Keith David, Robin Bartlett, Brady Jenness and Chris Galust joined the cast of the film.

Principal photography began on February 5, 2020, in Dallas and New Orleans.

== Release ==
It was released on March 26, 2021, by Vertical Entertainment and Redbox Entertainment.

== Reception ==
On Rotten Tomatoes, the film has an approval rating of 14%, based on reviews from 14 critics, with an average score of 4.10/10. On Metacritic, the film has a weighted average score of 43 out of 100, based on 6 critics, indicating "mixed or average reviews".

Owen Gleiberman of Variety wrote:

"The movie is diverting enough when it flirts with clerical politics, and that made me think it might be cool to make an exorcist film that dramatized the true-life ins and outs of the Catholic Church’s relationship to exorcism. There’s a major story there, and it could fuel a heady thriller. But The Seventh Day, having established Father Peter as a new kind of exorcist renegade, soon gets down to business as usual."
