= Dallas Sonnier =

American film producer (born 1980)

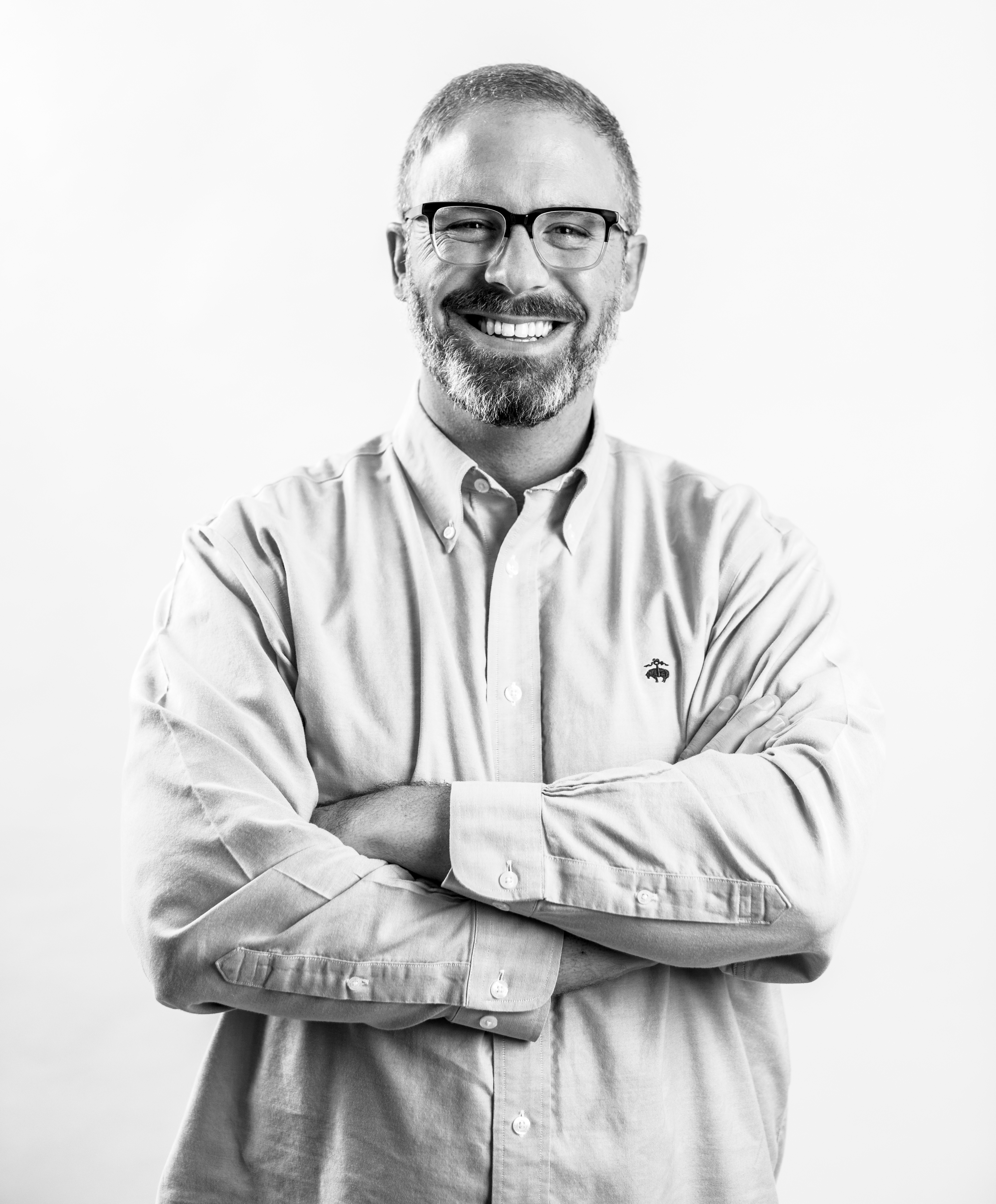
- Sonnier in 2019
- Born: Joseph Albert Sonnier IV; March 31, 1980 (age 46); Dallas, Texas, U.S.
- Education: University of Southern California
- Occupations: Film producer; book publisher
- Years active: 2005–present

Joseph Albert "Dallas" Sonnier IV (born March 31, 1980) is an American film producer, publisher, and businessman. He is best known as the founder of Cinestate and, from 2018 to 2020, the publisher of Fangoria magazine. He has producing credits on the films Bone Tomahawk (2015), Brawl in Cell Block 99 (2017), The Standoff at Sparrow Creek (2018) and Dragged Across Concrete (2019), among others. In 2018, he purchased the rights to Fangoria and relaunched the defunct magazine as a print-only publication; he additionally expanded the Fangoria brand to encompass a publishing and film production company.

Beginning his career as an agent, Sonnier later gravitated towards production, initially founding the California-based Caliber Media with partner Jack Heller. Wanting to bring major film productions to the state of Texas, he returned there in 2016 to found the Dallas-based production company Cinestate.

== Early life and education ==
Dallas Sonnier was born Joseph Albert Sonnier IV in the Highland Park neighborhood of Dallas, Texas, US. His parents, Becky and Dr. Joseph Sonnier moved from Shreveport, Louisiana to Dallas, Texas, shortly before he was born in 1980; Sonnier's nickname originated with his parents referring to him as "the Dallas baby".

Sonnier developed an ambition to begin making movies while still in high school; to this end, he began taking continuing education classes in screenwriting at Southern Methodist University during the Summer before his senior year at Highland Park High School. He attended film classes at the University of Southern California while still in high school, and later as an undergrad, becoming one of five students to inaugurate the school's joint business-film program, introducing him to studio executives, entertainment attorneys, agents, and talent managers. During this period, he learned about aspects of the film making process beyond writing and directing.

== Career ==
After graduating from USC, Sonnier obtained a job with United Talent Agency, beginning in the mailroom and working his way up to agent trainee. After a few years, he left to join a start-up management firm run by David Schiff. In 2008, Sonnier and Jack Heller, a USC classmate, founded Caliber Media. While attending San Diego Comic-Con, the pair met former wrestler Stone Cold Steve Austin, eventually collaborating with him on nine low-budget action movies that were sold to distributors and premiered on DVD and video-on-demand. Caliber segued into other independent projects, before raising funds for two years in order to shoot Bone Tomahawk; the script had been written by one of the pair's clients, S. Craig Zahler, whom they had been managing for two years.

Zahler's script attracted Kurt Russell and Richard Jenkins, but the interested financiers wanted the script shortened. After several years of negotiations, Russell's agents were ready to move on if the movie was not fully financed in a matter of months. In 2014, Sonnier took out a new mortgage on his house in order to secure financing for the film. While the movie failed at the box office, it found success in ancillary markets like DVD sales and VOD rentals.

Following production on Bone Tomahawk, Sonnier departed Caliber to found Cinestate, a production company based in Dallas, with the intention of bringing film production to Texas. Sonnier would go on to collaborate with Zahler for two more films: Brawl in Cell Block 99 and Dragged Across Concrete.

In 2022, Sonnier became a key architect for the entertainment division of conservative news website and media company The Daily Wire.

== Production philosophy ==
Sonnier has stated that his approach to production is giving total creative freedom to writers and directors while also keeping budgets low enough that their projects can still be profitable. In interviews, he has been adamant about not making films that "pander" to any audience, as well as not filtering directors' creativity. His business model relies on making films as widely available as possible—through purchase, rental, or streaming—on multiple platforms to "piece together" revenue from every possible source.

Sonnier is also an advocate for filmmaking outside of New York and Los Angeles and not relying on the model of traditional studio systems.

== Cinestate ==
Sonnier founded Cinestate upon his move back to Dallas from California. According to him, the unique selling point of the company was that it produced films that were creatively unfiltered by producers or executives, and which represented the artistic vision of their creators.

While revenue from Cinestate productions were a fraction of major studio releases, the company remained profitable by keeping production costs low and relying on word-of-mouth.

In 2018, Sonnier completed the deal to acquire all the assets and trademarks of the Fangoria brand, including the horror movie magazine, and relaunched it as a division of Cinestate. Fangoria became print only and Sonnier hired a brand-new editor-in-chief, Phil Nobile Jr. of Birth.Movies.Death. As part of the arrangement, Cinestate acquired control over all material from over 300 issues of Fangoria, spanning the past forty years.

Cinestate also extended its brand into other content, publishing six genre novels (three under the Cinestate imprint and three under a Fangoria imprint), as well as audiobook adaptations of screenplays.

In 2020, following the arrest of producer Adam Donaghey for sexual assault and a Daily Beast article alleging misconduct on Cinestate sets, Sonnier was criticized for downplaying abusive behavior and endangering employees. The scandal led to Fangoria being sold. All of Cinestate's social media and websites went dormant, the company was closed, and its entire staff was laid off.

== Personal life ==
Dallas has one sibling, brother James, who is two years his junior. While Dallas was growing up, his parents allowed his friend Phillip Prestwood to move in due to a challenging situation in his own home. Although Prestwood was never formally adopted, he was unofficially considered a third son in the family.

While working in the Hollywood movie world in his early 20s, Dallas Sonnier developed a drug habit. He went into rehab at age 26, and has reportedly remained clean since then.

In 2008, Sonnier married his wife Shannon, whom he had initially encountered at a Malibu party a few years earlier; 15 minutes after meeting her, he says, he knew he would marry her.

Shannon gave birth to their first child, a daughter named Camilla, in 2010. They also have a son, Albert Joseph V.

== Parents' murders ==
In 1974, Dallas Sonnier's father, Dr. Joseph Albert Sonnier III, married his high school sweetheart, Becky. It was not long after graduation, and before they'd turned 20 years old. 27 years later, in October 2001, Becky left her husband for the man with whom she had secretly been having an affair, Juan Gallegos. On July 12, 2010, days after the birth of Becky's granddaughter Camilla, with Becky about to leave her second husband, Gallegos killed the family dog, then murdered Becky. He then called 911, and used the same weapon to end his own life while still on the phone with the police.

A few years after his wife had left him, Dr. Sonnier began dating a divorceé, Richelle Setina. Just under two years after his ex-wife was murdered, Dr. Sonnier was also murdered. On July 10, 2012, Dr. Sonnier was repeatedly shot and stabbed. Sonnier's girlfriend, Richelle Setina, had dated a plastic surgeon named Dr. Thomas Michael Dixon before dating Dr. Sonnier. Dixon was convicted of setting up the murder. Both he and the hitman he hired, David Shepard, are serving life sentences.

== Filmography ==
Movies

- 2009: Damage (executive producer)
- 2010: The Stranger (executive producer)
- 2010: Hunt to Kill (executive producer)
- 2011: Recoil (executive producer)
- 2011: Born to Fight (executive producer)
- 2011: Tactical Force (executive producer)
- 2011: Enter Nowhere (producer)
- 2012: Refuge (producer)
- 2012: Static (executive producer)
- 2013: The Package (executive producer)
- 2013: Bad Milo (executive producer)
- 2014: 3 Nights in the Desert (executive producer)
- 2014: Warren (executive producer)
- 2014: The Scribbler (producer)
- 2014: Making the Rules (executive producer)
- 2014: Dark was the Night (executive producer)
- 2015: The Automatic Hate (producer)
- 2015: Some Kind of Hate (executive producer)
- 2015: Bone Tomahawk (producer)
- 2015: Condemned (producer)
- 2015: Figurehead (producer)
- 2016: Hot (executive producer)
- 2018: Brawl in Cell Block 99 (producer)
- 2018: Puppet Master: The Littlest Reich (producer)
- 2018: Dragged Across Concrete (producer)
- 2018: The Standoff at Sparrow Creek (producer)
- 2019: Satanic Panic (producer)
- 2019: V.F.W (producer)
- 2020: Run Hide Fight (producer)
- 2020: Castle Freak (producer)
- 2021: The Seventh Day (producer)
- 2021: South of Heaven (producer)
- 2022: Shut In (producer)
- 2022: The Hyperions (producer)
- 2022: What Is a Woman? (producer)
- 2022: Terror on the Prairie (producer)
- 2023: Muzzle (executive producer)
- 2023: Lady Ballers (producer)
- 2024: Am I Racist? (executive producer)
- 2025: Muzzle: City of Wolves (executive producer)
- 2025: Frontier Crucible (producer)
- 2026: Run Hide Fight: Infidels (producer)
- TBA: John Rambo (producer)
- TBA: Pawn Shop (producer)

Television

- 2023: Convicting a Murderer (producer)
- 2023–2024: A Wonderful Day with Mabel Maclay (executive producer)
- 2023–2024: Chip Chilla (executive producer)
- 2024: Mr. Birchum (producer)
- 2026: The Pendragon Cycle: Rise of the Merlin (executive producer)
