= Bone Tomahawk =

2015 American Western film

- Theatrical release poster
- Directed by: S. Craig Zahler
- Written by: S. Craig Zahler
- Produced by: Jack Heller; Dallas Sonnier
- Starring: Kurt Russell; Patrick Wilson; Matthew Fox; Lili Simmons; Richard Jenkins; Evan Jonigkeit; Kathryn Morris; Sid Haig; David Arquette; Fred Melamed
- Cinematography: Benji Bakshi
- Edited by: Greg D'Auria; Fred Raskin
- Music by: Jeff Herriott; S. Craig Zahler
- Production companies: Caliber Media Company; The Fyzz Facility
- Distributed by: RLJ Entertainment
- Release dates: October 1, 2015 (Fantastic Fest); October 23, 2015 (United States)
- Running time: 132 minutes
- Country: United States
- Language: English
- Budget: $1.8 million
- Box office: $475,846

Bone Tomahawk is a 2015 American Western horror film written and directed by S. Craig Zahler in his directorial debut, and starring Kurt Russell, Patrick Wilson, Matthew Fox, Richard Jenkins, Lili Simmons, Evan Jonigkeit, David Arquette, Zahn McClarnon, and Sid Haig. It was produced by Jack Heller and Dallas Sonnier. The film is about a small-town sheriff who leads a posse into a desolate region to rescue three people who were abducted.

Development of the film started when Zahler's friend and manager Sonnier recommended creating a film adaptation of Zahler's Western novel Wraiths of the Broken Land. Realizing that such a project could not be adapted on a low budget, Zahler opted to write a rescue Western instead. Casting began in October 2014, with Peter Sarsgaard, Timothy Olyphant, and Jennifer Carpenter signed on to play before being replaced by Wilson, Fox, and Simmons respectively due to scheduling conflicts. Principal photography took place in California over a course of 21 days in October 2014.

The premiere of Bone Tomahawk took place at Fantastic Fest on October 1, 2015. RLJ Entertainment gave the film a limited release on October 23, grossing over $480,000 in theater sales and $4.32 million in home media sales against a $1.8 million budget. The film received mainly positive reviews, with praise for Zahler's screenplay and direction and the performances of the ensemble cast.

== Plot ==
In the 1890s, brigands Purvis and Buddy are ambushed at a Native American burial site. Buddy is killed while Purvis escapes to a nearby town, Bright Hope, and buries his loot. Deputy Chicory reports him to Sheriff Franklin Hunt, who interrogates Purvis. When Purvis attempts to flee, Hunt shoots him in the leg and sends the confident gunslinger John Brooder to fetch the town's doctor. He returns with Samantha O'Dwyer, the doctor's assistant, who was caring for her husband Arthur's injured leg. Hunt leaves Samantha in his office with his other deputy, Nick, to tend to Purvis' wounds.

That night, a stable boy is killed. Hunt finds his office empty, with an arrow left behind. The Professor, an educated Native American, links the arrow to a tribe of inbred troglodyte cannibals who live in a distant valley. He warns Hunt they've been shunned by other native tribes. Certain that Samantha, Nick, and Purvis have been captured by them, Hunt forms a rescue party with Chicory and Brooder. Arthur insists on accompanying them.

After several days' ride, two strangers stumbling across the rescue party's camp are killed by Brooder, fearing them to be scouts for a raid. The rescue party sets up a new camp but is ambushed by raiders who injure Brooder's horse and steal the others. A fight between Brooder and Arthur exacerbates Arthur's leg wound and Chicory, Hunt, and Brooder leave him to continue on foot. The rescue party reaches the valley and is ambushed by the troglodytes. Brooder is killed while Hunt and Chicory are captured.

Hunt and Chicory are imprisoned near Samantha and Nick in a cave. She explains the troglodytes have already killed and eaten Purvis. The group is forced to watch Nick being scalped, bisected alive, and consumed. Hunt tricks their captors into drinking from his liquor flask which has been laced with opium tincture. One dies, another becomes unconscious, and Samantha estimates only seven male troglodytes remain. The troglodyte leader is angered by the poisoning and they cut open Hunt's abdomen, shoving the opium flask into the wound, and shoot him.

Arthur has followed the rescue party's trail. He kills two troglodytes and discovers they use crude animal bone whistles to communicate. He lures another troglodyte to his death then arrives at the cave and helps Hunt kill the leader and free Samantha and Chicory. The mortally injured Hunt stays behind with a rifle, promising to kill the remaining three troglodyte males when they return, to prevent them from terrorizing Bright Hope. The three survivors leave the cave, passing by two pregnant troglodyte women, whose limbs were amputated and had stakes driven into their eyes to blind them.

Once clear of the valley, Arthur blows on the troglodyte whistle, with no response. Later, they hear three gunshots in the distance.

== Cast ==
- Kurt Russell as Sheriff Franklin Hunt
- Patrick Wilson as Arthur O'Dwyer
- Matthew Fox as John Brooder
- Richard Jenkins as Deputy Chicory
- Lili Simmons as Samantha O'Dwyer
- Evan Jonigkeit as Deputy Nick
- David Arquette as Purvis
- Kathryn Morris as Lorna Hunt
- Sid Haig as Buddy
- Sean Young as Mrs. Porter
- Fred Melamed as Clarence
- Maestro Harrell as Gizzard
- Jamison Newlander as The Mayor
- James Tolkan as Pianist
- Jeremy Tardy as Buford
- Michael Paré as Mr. Wallington
- Zahn McClarnon as The Professor
- Michael Emery as Redheaded Fellow
- Raw Leiba as Wolf Skull
- Geno Segers as Boar Tusks
- Eddie Spears as Serrated Tomahawk
- Alex Meraz as Eagle Skulls
- Jay Tavare as Sharp Teeth

== Production ==
=== Development ===
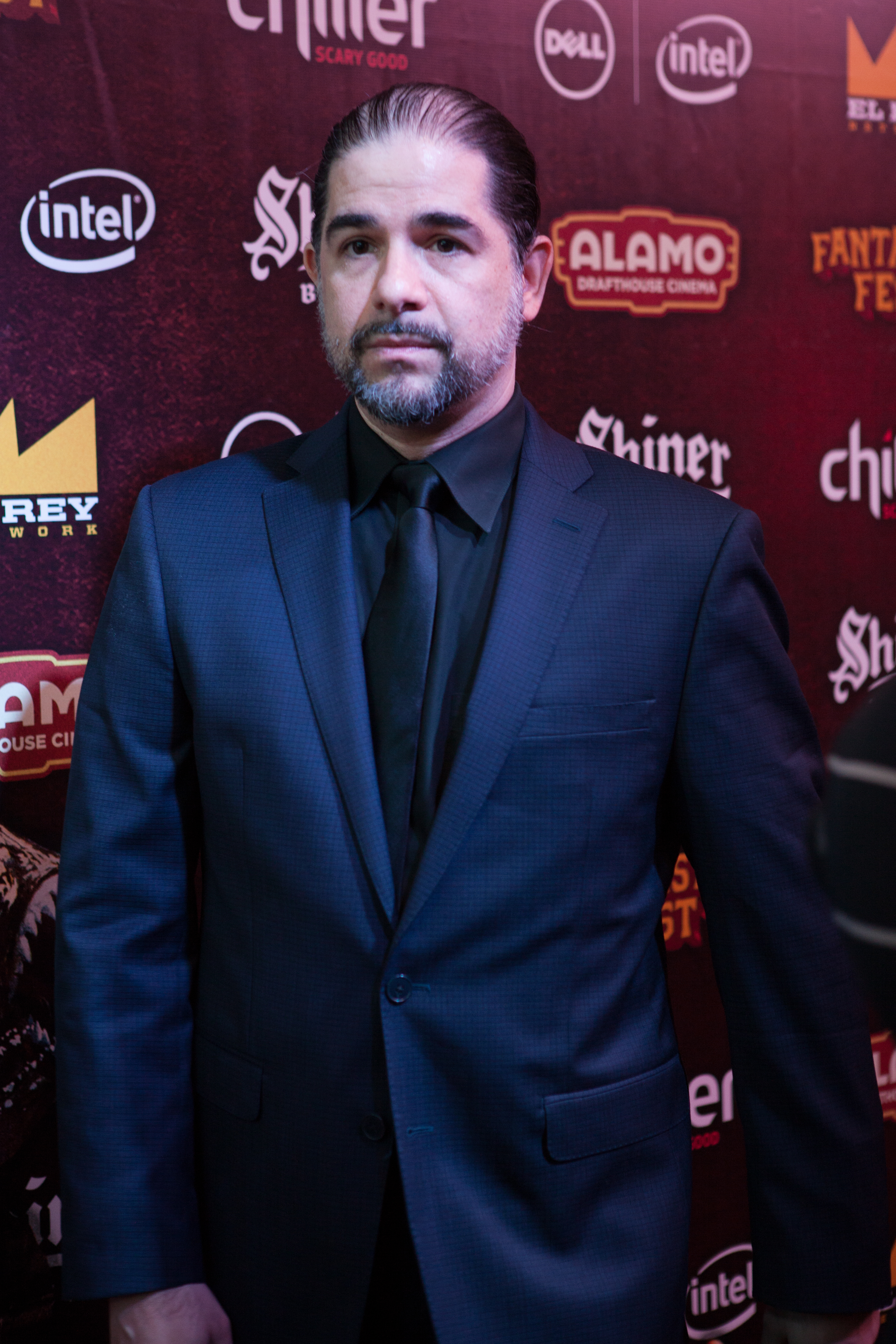
Writer-director S. Craig Zahler at 2015 Fantastic Fest

Bone Tomahawk is the directorial debut of screenwriter and novelist S. Craig Zahler, who wrote the script in 2011. Zahler had previously completed more than 40 original screenplays for Hollywood, including The Brigands of Rattleborge, which topped The Black List in 2006. However, only one film was produced: the 2011 low-budget horror film Asylum Blackout.

Zahler had previously written four Westerns, making Bone Tomahawk his fifth work in the genre. In 2005, Zahler watched 19 films in two weeks at a Westerns festival at the Film Forum. On seeing a film he didn't like, he began to think about how he would improve it, and he decided to write novels and screenplays in the genre. The concept of Bone Tomahawk arose when Zahler's manager, producer and friend Dallas Sonnier proposed he make a film adaption of his novel Wraiths of the Broken Land, directed by Zahler himself. However, Zahler believed the novel could not be adapted on a low budget and opted to write a rescue Western, Bone Tomahawk, instead. Bone Tomahawk was described by Alex Godfrey of The Guardian as "a western with horror trimmings," but has been described by Zahler as just a direct Western, with references to lost race fiction such as H. Rider Haggard's King Solomon's Mines. Zahler incorporated some details of his personal life into the script, such as when Brooder says, "Smart men don't get married", to reflect his own disinterest in marriage. Zahler includes humor in every work he writes, stating, "you're dealing with a serious situation, but if everyone is frowning and dour all the time, and you don't see life or love in these characters, I don't know why you care."

When selling the movie to investors, Zahler used directors such as John Cassavetes, Larry Clark, Wong Kar-wai, and Takeshi Kitano as stylistic reference points, despite none being filmmakers in the Western genre. Despite Sonnier's assurances that there will be no intervention in the script, investors still wanted the script to be changed due to conflicting interpretations of the film's genre, and the film being Zahler's directorial debut. Zahler refused to compromise on full creative control and reducing the film length to 90 minutes. Zahler and Sonnier finally accumulated a $1.8 million budget, half provided by Sonnier and the other half provided by British company The Fyzz Facility. Due to budget constraints, a substantial amount of content in the script did not make it into the final film. Production of the film was made public on October 30, 2012 and was funded by Caliber Media Company, owned by Sonnier and Jack Heller, with French company Celluloid Dreams handling international sales.

=== Casting ===
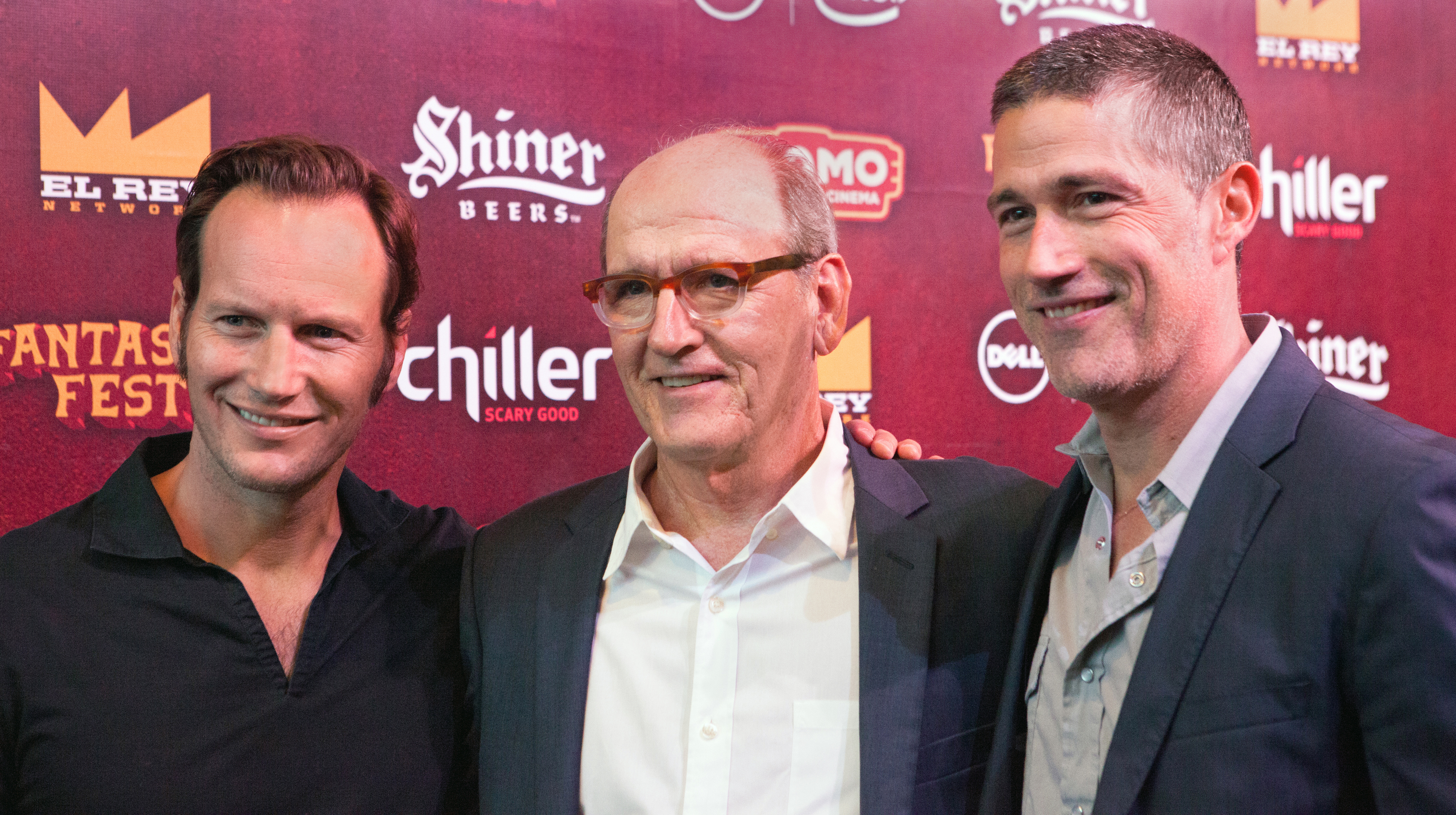
Patrick Wilson, Richard Jenkins, and Matthew Fox at 2015 Fantastic Fest

Kurt Russell's agent handed over the script to Peter Sarsgaard, who enjoyed the script and signed on to the movie, leading to him passing the script off to Russell. Zahler thought that Russell was a good fit for the role of Sheriff Franklin Hunt, who read the script and quickly agreed to perform. Russell got along well with Zahler, and had also read Zahler's novel Wraiths of the Broken Land. In his interview with Collider, Russell appreciated Zahler's script and his "sparse" writing style, stating that Bone Tomahawk is a graphic Western rather than a straight Western or a horror Western.

On October 31, 2012, Russell, Sarsgaard, Richard Jenkins, and Jennifer Carpenter signed on to play a sheriff, a cowboy, an oldster, and one of the captives of troglodyte cannibals, respectively. On September 24, 2014, Patrick Wilson and Matthew Fox joined the cast. On September 29, Lili Simmons, David Arquette, Sid Haig, Kathryn Morris, and Evan Jonigkeit joined the film, with Simmons replacing Carpenter. The other ensemble cast added by the director includes Sean Young, Geno Segers, Fred Melamed, James Tolkan, Raw Leiba, Jamie Hector, Jamison Newlander, Michael Paré, Zahn McClarnon, David Midthunder, Jay Tavare, Gray Wolf Herrera, Robert Allen Mukes, and Brandon Molale. Sarsgaard and Timothy Olyphant, who were originally scheduled to star in the film, withdrew.

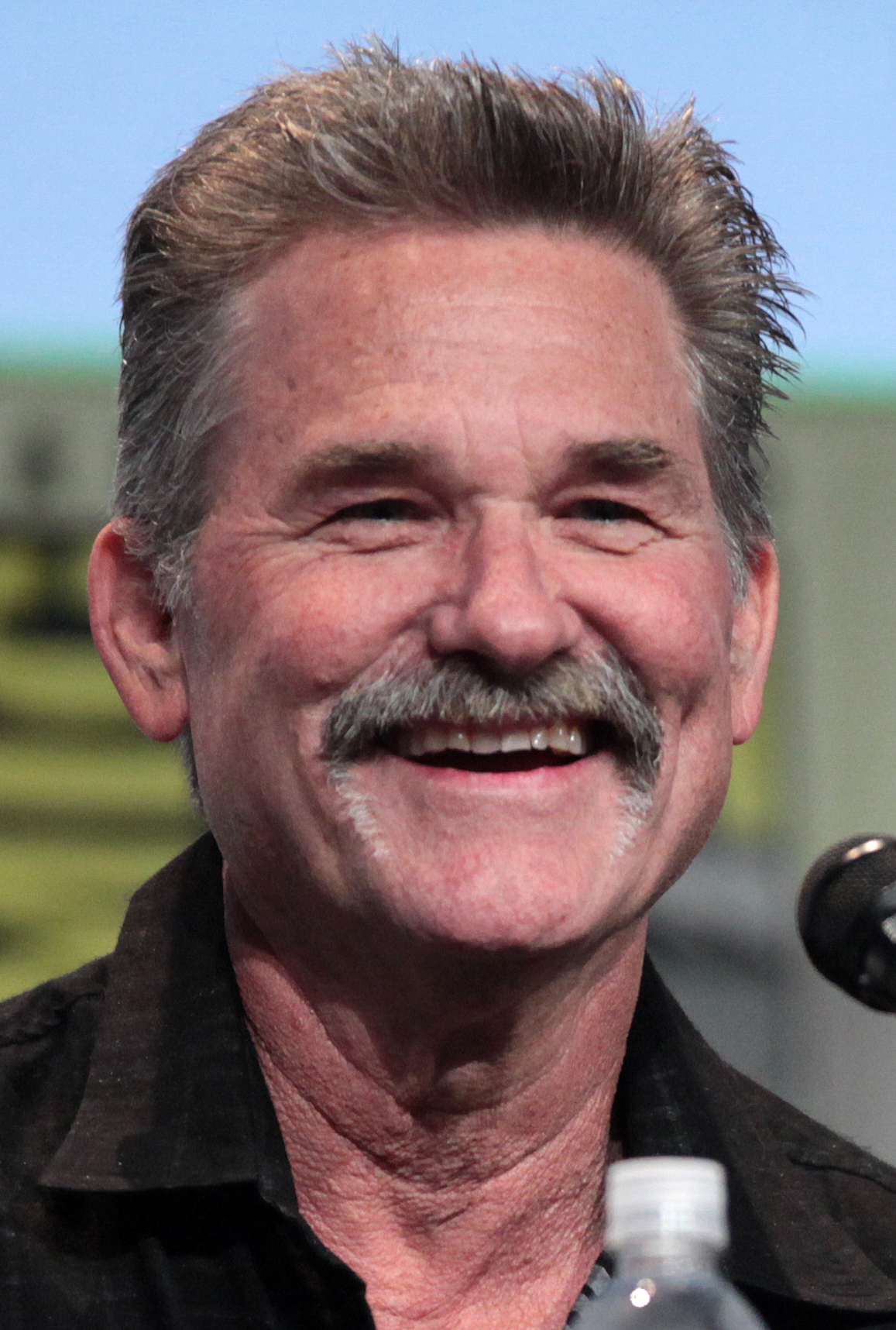
Kurt Russell at 2015 San Diego Comic-Con

Russell praised Zahler's skills as a director, especially since Bone Tomahawk is his directorial debut. Russell described Sheriff Franklin Hunt as a stubborn and simple good man, whose behavior and tone were very in line with the era in the film. In his comparisons of Hunt to Wyatt Earp, he thought that Hunt and Earp will respect each other, but Earp will be uninterested in him due to Hunt being a low-profile person. In addition, since Russell was also involved in The Hateful Eight at about the same time, he had to look different between the two films in regards to the style of hair and beard, remarking: "I had to cheat it. So the look I have in Bone Tomahawk was sort of a halfway house thing, halfway to where I was going for Hateful Eight. It's in full blown maturity in Hateful Eight!" Jenkins was Zahler's primary choice for the role of Deputy Chicory, who ended up becoming Zahler's favorite character to write. Although Chicory was written with Jenkins' voice in mind, Jenkins decided to give Chicory an accent and a raspy voice, and though he ended up acting in a normal voice, he still pushed the accent on-screen.

=== Filming ===
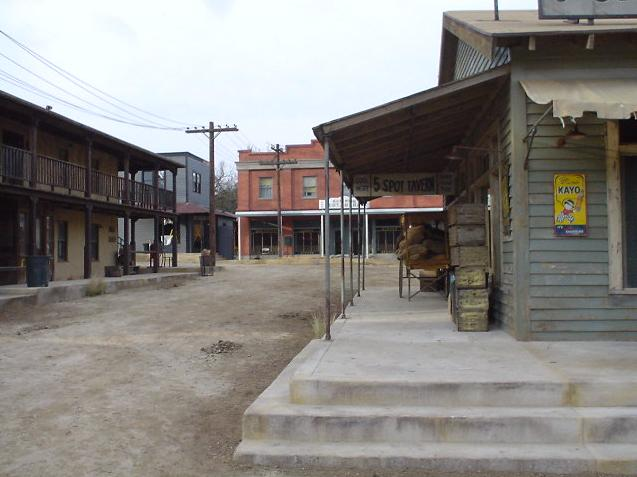
Paramount Ranch, where filming took place

Principal photography occurred over 21 days at the Paramount Ranch in California. Previously, the crew scouted filming locations at New Mexico, Utah, and Romania. Before filming began, experts told Zahler that shooting could take sixty days and cost $10 million, so Zahler kept a close eye on the schedule while filming and relying on staff to get the job done in a short amount of time. The actors performed their roles in the shortest amount of time possible, with one of the scenes using two takes; Russell also gave advice on shooting the violent scenes of the film. During filming, there were multiple firearms malfunctioning, as well as problems regarding special effects, makeup, personnel, and positioning. In order to shoot scenes with multiple characters on-screen, Bone Tomahawk was shot with a RED Dragon camera at a ratio of 2.35:1. In October 2017, Zahler reflected that he did not like that camera due to it being visually noisy, which led him to switch to the RED Weapon camera in his next film Brawl in Cell Block 99. Zahler avoids using too many close-ups in the film, remarking that "most of the time you interact with people, you're not looking just their faces from a close distance unless you're intimate." He believes that modern filmmaking's use of close-ups misses a lot of body language, especially the hands.

Bone Tomahawk is well-known for its violent scenes in the troglodytes' cave, most notably when Nick is mutilated and torn in half by the cannibals.

The troglodytes' cave was shot in California and was a setting in the TV series Weeds and the movie Iron Man (2008). Zahler shows a dry presentation of violence in his films, using long shots to capture horrific violent acts on people, similar to Cannibal Holocaust (1980). Zahler explained that violence enhances the characters, stating: "By showing all that violence and showing him talking the guy through it—for me it was always a real scene of strength for Sheriff Hunt, to not just cower away or start blubbering—he's talking a person through the worst moment of his life. As hideous as the violence is in that scene, it's a real showing of character strength for Sheriff Hunt. He endures that and does something during those actions that most people couldn't do." Zahler did not fully focus the camera on the troglodytes, wanting to make their culture more mysterious.

=== Music ===
Bone Tomahawk (Original Motion Picture Soundtrack)

Soundtrack album by Jeff Herriott, S. Craig Zahler
- Released: October 23, 2015
- Length: 20:10
- Label: Lakeshore Records

The film's soundtrack was composed by Zahler's friend Jeff Herriott. Herriott made the music accompany "long shots, rather than close-ups" and function as mood-setting or establish scenes and make transitions when there was no dialogue. Lakeshore Records released the soundtrack in Digital on October 23, 2015 and in vinyl formats.

All music is composed by Jeff Herriott and S. Craig Zahler.

No.	Title	Length
1.	"Four Ride Out"	01:23
2.	"In the Defile"	03:21
3.	"Four Ride Out Reprise"	00:48
4.	"Dragged Along A Coarse Course"	01:12
5.	"One Man Walks"	02:25
6.	"Four Dead Men Ride Out"	00:41
7.	"The Burdened Quartet"	01:14
8.	"Den Of Boar Tusks"	02:26
9.	"The Survivors Continue"	02:10
10.	"Four Doomed Men Ride Out"	04:04
Total length:		20:10

== Release ==
In August 2015, RLJ Entertainment acquired distribution rights to the film, which had its world premiere at the Fantastic Fest on October 1, 2015. It later screened at the Charlotte Film Festival on October 3, 2015 and later at the London Film Festival on October 10, 2015. The first trailer of Bone Tomahawk was released on October 2, 2015. On October 23, 2015, Bone Tomahawk was given a limited release in the United States, and later was released on Blu-ray and DVD on December 29, 2015. Bone Tomahawk was released in a few theaters in the United States, grossing $475,846, plus a total of $4.28 million in home media sales.

The Blu-ray disc includes behind-the-scenes production footage, theatrical trailers, a collection of posters, a Q&A session with the director and cast, and a deleted scene lasting for about two and a half minutes. The deleted scene is an extended version of the ending: Arthur, Chicory, and Samantha spend the night by a campfire, with Chicory naming Arthur as the new sheriff of Bright Hope before Arthur tries to read a "poem" to Samantha he wrote while he was working as a foreman.

== Reception ==
=== Critical response ===
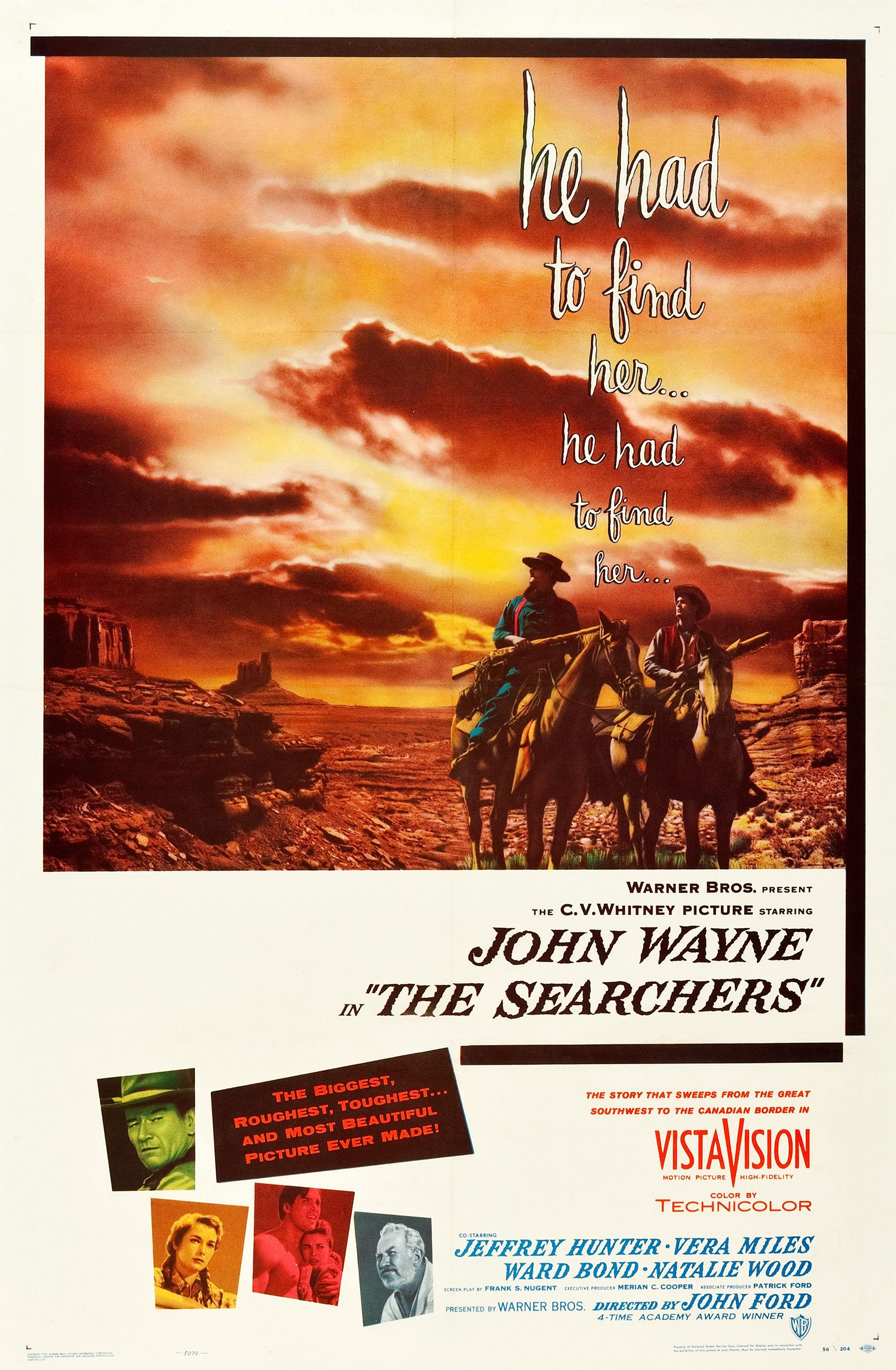
The film is often compared by critics to The Searchers (1956)

Bone Tomahawk received positive responses from critics and at festivals for its acting (particularly for Kurt Russell, Richard Jenkins, and Matthew Fox), grittiness, Zahler's direction, and dialogue, which is stated to be a combination of The Searchers and various cannibal films. Film review aggregator Rotten Tomatoes reports that 91% of critics gave the film a positive review with an average score of 7.3/10, based on 101 reviews, with a consensus of: "Bone Tomahawk's peculiar genre blend won't be for everyone, but its gripping performances and a slow-burning story should satisfy those in search of something different." Metacritic gave the film a weighted average score of 72 out of 100, based on 17 reviews from mainstream critics.

Praise was given to the story and script, of which Peter Bradshaw of The Guardian enjoyed the mix of horror and Western genres, a sentiment that Kim Newman of Empire concurs with. Other reviewers such as Jeannette Catsoulis of The New York Times and Tom Huddleston of Time Out London enjoyed the comedy that was intertwined within the horror and Western elements of the film. Reviewers such as Jeremy Aspinall from Radio Times called Bone Tomahawk a refreshing entry to the Western genre. Guy Lodge of Variety praised the film as "the wayward digressions of Zahler's script — navigated with palpable enjoyment by an expert, Kurt Russell-led ensemble — that are most treasurable in a film that commits wholeheartedly to its own curiosity value." John DeFore from The Hollywood Reporter offered the film similar praise, commending the film's performances, production design, cinematography, score, and screenplay, with the sentiment shared by Huddleston, Brian Tallerico of RogerEbert.com, and Don Kaye of Den of Geek.

Kaye directed criticism towards the film's runtime. Oliver Lyttelton of IndieWire found Zahler's writing to be engaging and unhurried, and the length to be not an issue. Other criticisms included Kevin Maher of The Times complaining that the violence in the film was a "copycat" of Quentin Tarantino's use of brutality in his films.

Manchester Metropolitan University professor Matthew Carter accused the film of perpetuating racist stereotypes against Native Americans, arguing that the film's "story is informed by one of white America's oldest and most paranoiac of racist-psychosexual myths: the captivity narrative..." in reference to O'Dwyer attempting to rescue his wife Samantha from a Native American tribe. Film critic Jeannette Catsoulis addressed the racist stereotypes in an otherwise positive review for The New York Times, taking the view that the film "may boast abysmal racial politics, but they’re also true to the terrors of the time. Of all the things we can expect from an Old West picture, cultural enlightenment isn’t one of them." In a mixed review, Slant Magazine critic Chuck Bowen described the film as "skittish about its racism, self-conscious in a manner reminiscent of Django Unchained...", suggesting Zahler used the Native American character of The Professor, who distances the majority of Natives from the murderous and cannibalistic "troglodytes," to dismiss accusations of bigotry from the general audience.

=== Accolades ===
Awards and nominations
Association	Date of ceremony	Category	Nominees	Result	References
Almería Western Film Festival	October 9, 2016	Best Technical-Artistic Western	Freddy Waff	Won	
Austin Film Critics Association	December 16, 2015	Best First Film		Nominated	
Buenos Aires International Festival of Independent Cinema	April 23, 2016	Best Avant-Garde & Genre	S. Craig Zahler	Won	
Dublin Film Critics' Circle	December 18, 2016	Best Screenplay	S. Craig Zahler	5th Place	
Fangoria Chainsaw Awards	March 13, 2016	Best Actor	Kurt Russell	Won	
Fangoria Chainsaw Awards	March 13, 2016	Best Supporting Actor	Richard Jenkins	Nominated	
Fangoria Chainsaw Awards	March 13, 2016	Best Makeup/Creature FX	Hugo Villasenor	Nominated	
Festival International du Film Fantastique de Gérardmer	January 31, 2016	Jury Prize	S. Craig Zahler	Won	
Independent Spirit Awards	February 27, 2016	Best Screenplay	S. Craig Zahler	Nominated	
Independent Spirit Awards	February 27, 2016	Best Supporting Actor	Richard Jenkins	Nominated	
Indiana Film Journalists Association Awards	December 14, 2015	Best Supporting Actor	Richard Jenkins	Nominated	
Indiana Film Journalists Association Awards	December 14, 2015	Original Vision Award		Nominated	
Phoenix Critics Circle	December 16, 2015	Best Horror Film		Nominated	
Phoenix Critics Circle	December 16, 2015	Best Supporting Actor	Richard Jenkins	Nominated	
Saturn Awards	June 22, 2016	Best Independent Film		Nominated	
Sitges Film Festival	October 17, 2015	Best Direction Award	S. Craig Zahler	Won	
Sitges Film Festival	October 17, 2015	José Luis Guarner Prize		Won	
