= Matt Walsh (political commentator) =

American far-right commentator (born 1986)

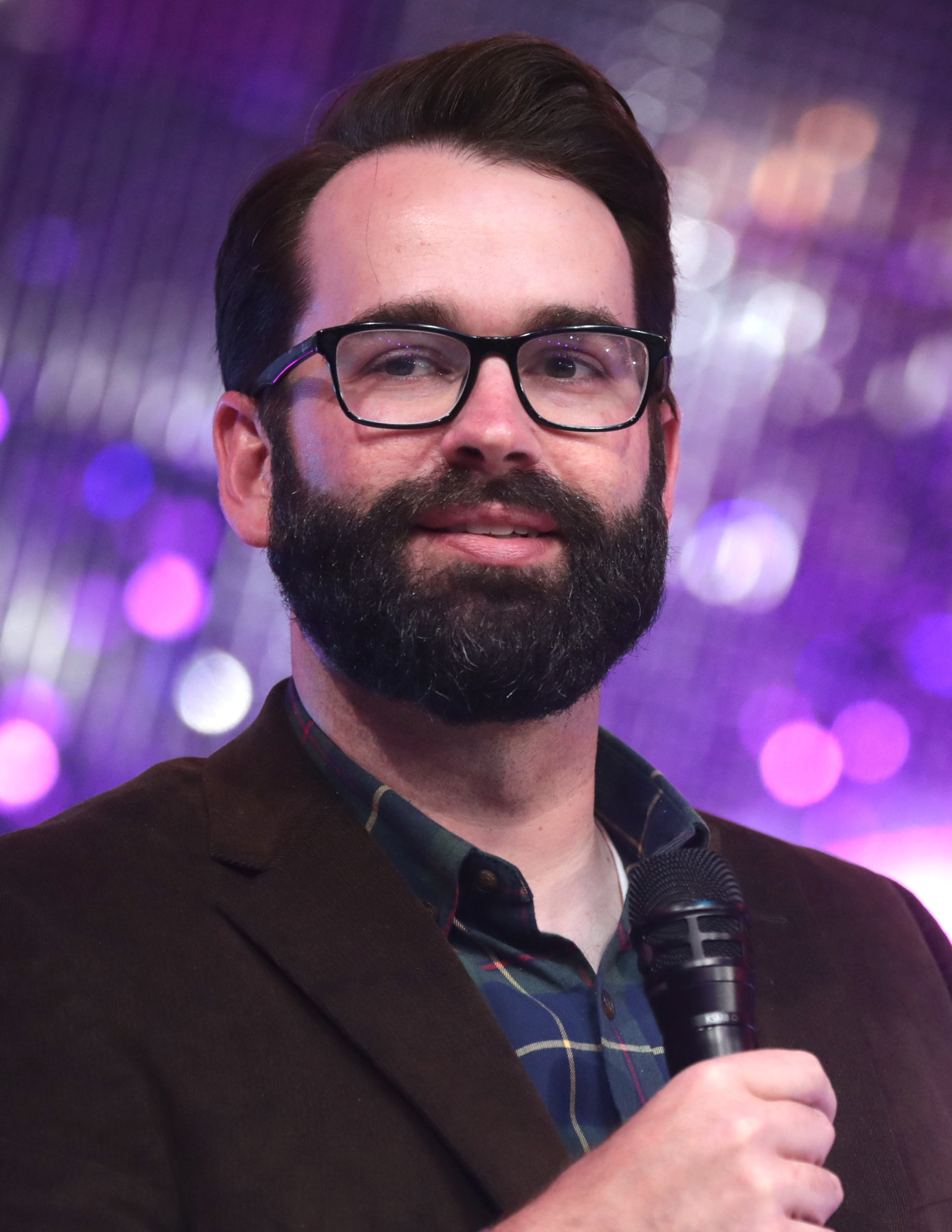
- Walsh in 2022
- Born: June 18, 1986 (age 40); Baltimore County, Maryland, U.S.
- Occupations: Political commentator; activist; podcaster; columnist; author
- Years active: 2010–present
- Employer: The Daily Wire
- Notable work: Johnny the Walrus; What Is a Woman?; Am I Racist?
- Movement: American conservatism, 2020s anti-LGBT movement in the United States
- Spouse: Alissa Ann Linnemann (m. 2011)
- Children: 6

YouTube information
- Channel: Matt Walsh
- Years active: 2012–present
- Genre: Political commentary
- Subscribers: 3.38 million
- Views: 1.44 billion
- Last updated: April 14, 2026

Matt Walsh (born June 18, 1986) is an American far-right political commentator, podcast host, and author. He hosts The Matt Walsh Show podcast and regularly appears on the American conservative website The Daily Wire. Walsh has authored four books and starred in The Daily Wire documentary films What Is a Woman? and Am I Racist?.

Walsh began his career in 2010 as a talk radio host for two stations in Delaware, before moving to Kentucky and launching his own website in 2012. He left WLAP in Kentucky when his show was canceled in December 2013 and joined Blaze Media in 2014. He joined The Daily Wire in 2017, and began hosting The Matt Walsh Show in 2018. Walsh has appeared on nationally syndicated shows.

Walsh opposes transgender rights and has campaigned in opposition to groups providing or encouraging transgender health care, particularly for minors. He has campaigned against several hospitals, comparing the transgender healthcare they provide to child sexual abuse, genital mutilation, and rape.

In 2022, Walsh released Johnny the Walrus, a children's book in which he compared being transgender to pretending to be a walrus, and What Is a Woman?, a documentary film about gender identity in the United States.

== Life and career ==
Walsh was born and raised in Baltimore County, Maryland.

He began his media career in 2010 as a talk radio co-host of The Matt and Crank Program on WZBH 93.5 FM in Georgetown, Delaware. In August 2011, he moved to WGMD 92.7 FM in Rehoboth Beach, Delaware, where he worked for less than a year. In 2012, Walsh relocated to Lexington, Kentucky, where he joined NewsRadio 630 WLAP and launched a website, The Matt Walsh Blog, where he wrote on political and cultural issues from a conservative perspective. In December 2013, he announced he was "leaving radio forever" following the cancellation of his show to focus on blogging.

In October 2014, Walsh joined Blaze Media. He has also contributed to HuffPost and began writing for The Daily Wire in October 2017. Walsh has appeared on television programs including Tucker Carlson Tonight, The Ingraham Angle, Fox & Friends, Dr. Phil, and on the podcast The Joe Rogan Experience.

Walsh began hosting The Matt Walsh Show on YouTube in April 2018 as a weekday program approximately one hour in length. In April 2023, he announced that the show would move to The Daily Wire platform after his YouTube channel was demonetized for violating platform policies related to gender identity content regarding Dylan Mulvaney.

Walsh's work has received support from public figures including Elon Musk and some Republican legislators. Author J. K. Rowling commented favorably on What Is a Woman?, stating that it "exposed" the "incoherence of gender identity."

=== Johnny the Walrus ===
On March 29, 2022, Daily Wire's DW Books published Walsh's children's book Johnny the Walrus, which compares being trans to identifying as a walrus.

Former Fox News host Tucker Carlson called the book "hilarious". Conservative news website TheBlaze called the book "an effort to push back against radical gender ideology which defies biological reality". LGBTQ Nation denounced the book, calling it "anti-transgender" and a mockery of transgender youth, while PinkNews referred to it as "hateful" and "transphobic". It was listed as the bestselling LGBT+-related book on Amazon in December 2021 before Amazon recategorized it to Political and Social Commentary. Walsh called the recategorization "an unconscionable attack on gay rights and a horrific example of homophobia and gay erasure". Target removed the book from its online bookstore on the same day.

=== What Is a Woman? ===
Walsh's online documentary, What Is a Woman? was released by The Daily Wire on June 1, 2022, at the start of Pride Month. In the film, Walsh asks various people the question, "What is a woman?" while presenting his own views on the topic. Walsh had asked the same question in other appearances, including a Dr. Phil show on January 19, 2022, with transgender and non-binary people. On June 14, Walsh published a book based on the documentary, entitled What Is a Woman?: One Man's Journey to Answer the Question of a Generation through DW Books.

The documentary received a divided reception from critics and political commentators. Critics, such as AJ Erkert of Science-Based Medicine, Erin Rook of LGBTQ Nation, and academics, argued the film was "propaganda", spread "transphobic lies", and was "science denying", seeking to ridicule the medical experts interviewed if they did not agree with Walsh's position. Erkert compared the documentary to the antiscience films Vaxxed and Expelled. Conservative commentators, such as Rich Lowry and Rod Dreher, praised the film as "mesmerizing" and "excellent". Dimitrije Vojnov of Radio Television of Serbia said that Walsh could become the American right's equivalent of Michael Moore, and just as biased.

Eventbrite banned screenings of the documentary due to the service not permitting content that promotes "hate, violence, or harassment towards others and/or oneself". Walsh denied that the documentary was hate speech and accused Eventbrite of hypocrisy for permitting the screening of drag shows that allow children in attendance, which Walsh considers a form of grooming.

In February 2022, Eli Erlick, a transgender activist, alleged that Walsh had invited dozens of people to participate in the documentary under false pretenses. Kataluna Enriquez, Fallon Fox, and other transgender public figures corroborated the account. Walsh created a group called the Gender Unity Project, which the individuals said attempted to lure them into participating in the film. The Gender Unity Project's Twitter account and website were taken down shortly after the allegations went public. Erlick claimed there were at least 50 other recruited interviewees, including a 14-year-old transgender girl.

Walsh's What Is a Woman? college tour attracted protests of his appearances for screenings at University of Houston and the University of Wisconsin.

For June Pride Month of 2023, The Daily Wire made What is a Woman? available for free on Twitter. The Daily Wire CEO Jeremy Boreing tweeted that Twitter had canceled a plan to promote the video for "hateful conduct," reportedly because of misgendering, and said the video was being suppressed. Twitter CEO Elon Musk initially agreed to lift only some restrictions, but after pressure removed all restrictions and personally promoted the video. Chiefs of Twitter's trust and safety division left the company on the same day.

=== Am I Racist? ===
Walsh starred in, co-wrote, and co-produced the documentary film Am I Racist?, released on September 13, 2024, which lampooned the diversity, equity, and inclusion (DEI) movement. Described as a mockumentary in the style of Borat, it grossed $12.3 million against a production budget of $3 million, becoming the highest-grossing documentary film of 2024.

== Political positions ==
=== General ===
Walsh's views have mainly been described as right-wing, conservative, and far-right. His commentary is sometimes described by media outlets as trolling or provocation. He labels himself a "theocratic fascist" in his Twitter biography, which he said he uses ironically.

Southern Poverty Law Center said Walsh's rhetoric has contributed to anti-LGBT violence and political violence and labeled some of his comments as white supremacist and male supremacist.

He has argued for banning pornography.

On issues like criminal reform, Walsh has publicly called on Twitter for increased executions, especially public lashings and public hangings, as well as corporal punishment and hard labor.

=== Environmental issues ===
In July 2022, Walsh took to Twitter to argue that ozone depletion and acid rain were never serious problems.

In September 2024 Walsh claimed that despite there being talks about an incoming historical hurricane season, that there were no hurricanes. He then argued that "Climate change theory is flawed because it cannot exactly predict how many hurricanes there will be". Walsh added "A theory should be able to make predictions, so if a theory makes a prediction that does not come to pass, there is something wrong with that theory."

=== Abortion ===
Walsh has said that he believes abortion is murder. On November 8, 2023, in an episode of The Matt Walsh Show, Walsh said:

"I wouldn't compromise on abortion even if it really did mean losing every election from now to kingdom come. To accept child murder is to forfeit your soul. If we are really a country, if it is true that we are now a country where child murder is so fundamentally popular that it's impossible to win by opposing it, then we are not a country worth saving anymore… I will never accept abortion. I will never compromise on it. I would rather die. That's where I stand."

=== Race ===
In April 2024, Walsh defended far-right website VDARE, claiming it was being targeted by a government investigation due to its "inconvenient" and "unpopular" beliefs.

After the murder of Austin Metcalf, in April 2025, Walsh stated: "Young black males are violent to a wildly, outrageously disproportionate degree. That's just a fact. We all know it. And it's time that we speak honestly about it, or nothing will ever change."

In early May 2025, Walsh supported Shiloh Hendrix, the white Minnesota woman caught on video using the word nigger several times towards a 5-year-old black child and the black man who filmed the incident. Walsh expressed satisfaction with Hendrix having raised $500,000 on the crowdfunding site GiveSendGo, saying "I’m glad she raised half a million dollars. I hope she raises half a million more" and that it was "time to start swinging back".

In October 2025, following Politico's reporting on a leaked Young Republican group chat containing racist and antisemitic messages, Walsh insisted that the "biggest problem" for conservatives was not sticking together.

Walsh has called multiculturalism a "failed experiment" he thinks "should be abandoned."

=== Immigration ===
In March 2025, Walsh made a post on X saying that "America is not a nation 'built by immigrants'. America was built by settlers. There's a difference. Settlers ventured out into the wilderness to build a civilization from scratch. The modern immigrant comes to a place that is already built. Settlers planted the trees. The immigrant comes to eat the fruits. If you cannot see the difference, I don't know how else to explain it."

In April 2026, Walsh took to X to say that "40 percent of New York City's population is foreign born. Not just second and third generation immigrants. Foreign born. Almost half the city wasn't born in this country. NYC isn't an American city anymore by any reasonable definition of the term. It's a tragedy and a disgrace."

=== Colonialism ===
Walsh argued that "The conquest and colonization and settling of this land was, overall, a good and noble and courageous thing", for which people should be grateful, and that the colonizers were heroes, but he considers Western countries' "cultural colonization" of Africa about LGBT issues to be wrong, despite Africa's long history of dealing with these issues before the colonization. He also stated that "All of us today would be in a worse spot if slavery never existed at all across the entire globe" also arguing that African-Americans are much better off in the United States than they would be in the countries from which their ancestors were taken. He has stated that, "everything you were told about the civil rights movement was a lie".

=== LGBTQ+ issues ===
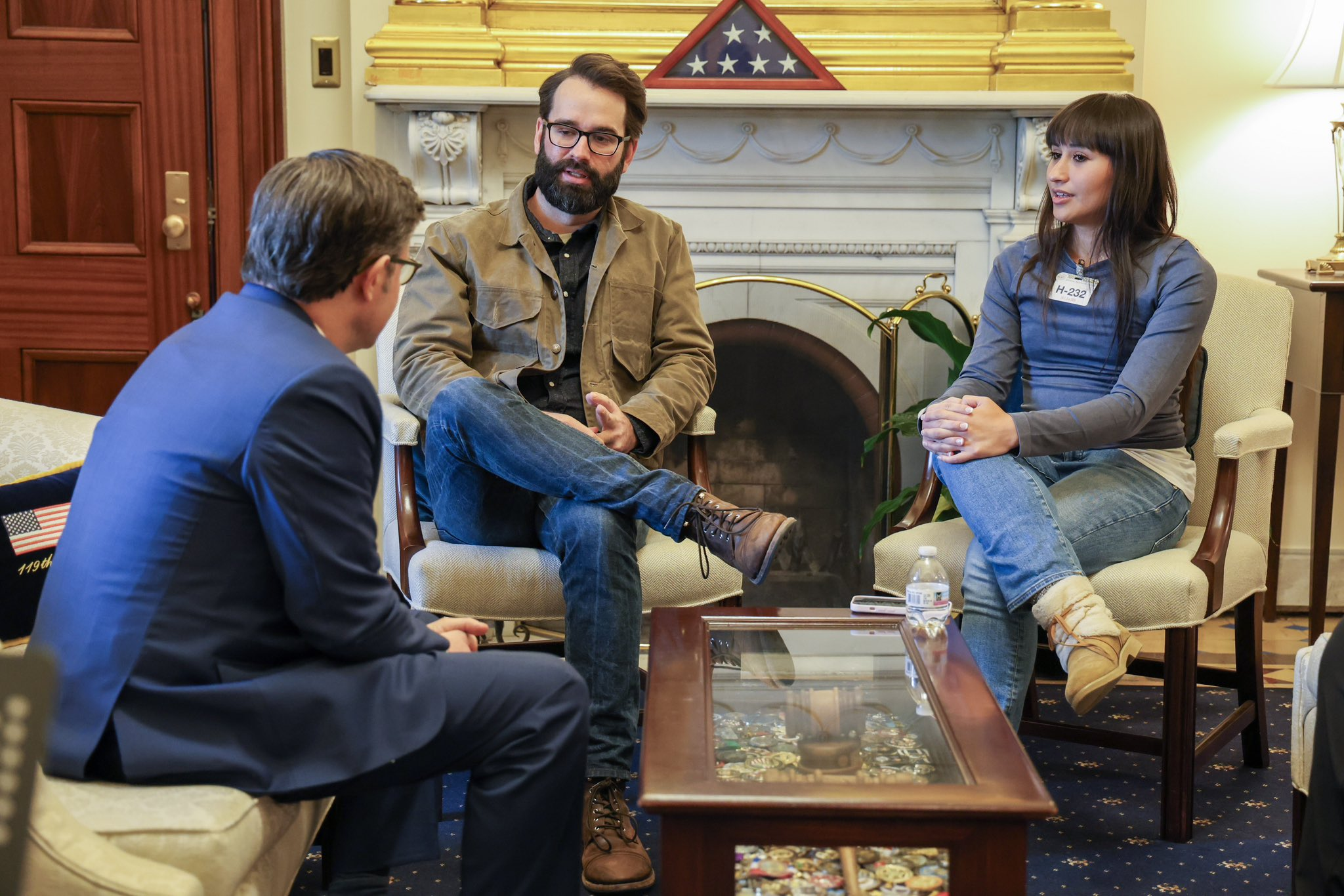
Walsh and activist Chloe Cole discussing the United States v. Skrmetti Supreme Court case with U.S. House Speaker Mike Johnson in 2024.

Walsh opposes same-sex parenting and adoption. He has argued that it would be better for a child to grow up with a missing arm than with same-sex parents, and described it as "human trafficking" and a "mad scientist horror".

Walsh has also spoken out against same-sex marriage, stating that by the same logic with which it is approved, then "An incestuous couple can use this same reasoning as gays, so can polygamists, so can bigamists", and that marriage should be reserved for heterosexual couples because they can have children; despite these claims, he partially approved polygamy, because "at least a polygamous marriage can still be procreative, and at least there’s some historical precedent for it".

Walsh has expressed support for the pseudoscientific practice of conversion therapy, arguing that it is an effective method at changing sexual orientation, that sexual orientation is not innate, and that "no sane person thinks that" there are "homosexual infants".

In February 2021, after a Gallup poll showed an increase of people who identify as LGBT, especially bisexual and transgender among in Generation Z, Walsh accused "the media, Hollywood, and the school system" of "recruiting" children into the LGBT community. Other commentators quoted by PinkNews attributed the increase to an easing of social stigma among young people.

After the Russian invasion of Ukraine began in February 2022, Walsh accused President Joe Biden of feminizing the U.S. military and recruiting lesbians who he said "can't do three pushups", and said that it was "not a coincidence that [Russia's invasion] happened after Biden spent his first year in office focusing primarily on wokeness".

The New York Times columnist Michelle Goldberg argued that Walsh's commentary, as well as that of other right-wing commentators, have caused an increase of anti-LGBT violence and sentiment in the United States. The Southern Poverty Law Center (SPLC) described Walsh as one of the "peddlers of fear and disinformation about LGBTQ people" in the wake of the Club Q mass shooting in November 2022. Walsh had previously said opposing all-age drag events was like fighting cancer, and "just like cancer, stopping it is not a gentle or a painless process". Following the shooting, Walsh described critics of his rhetoric as "soulless demons" and "evil to the core", accusing them of using the shooting to "blackmail us into accepting the castration and sexualization of children". Walsh rhetorically asked those on the left who felt that "the drag queen-child combination" would lead to "violent backlash" from right-wingers, "if it's causing this much chaos and violence, why do you insist on continuing to do it?" Jeet Heer from The Nation described Walsh's comments as "implicitly a threat," saying this was contributing to "a new lynching culture, with LGBTQ people as the target."

In April 2023, Walsh defended Uganda's anti-homosexuality bill, arguing that LGBTQ rights in Africa were a form of neocolonialism. The bill would enforce life in prison for anybody identifying as gay or bisexual. Walsh argued that opponents to the bill "don't think that Uganda has any particular right to govern itself and have its own culture and its own way of life."

Walsh has also denied the existence of pansexuality, calling these people "indecisive", and has defined asexuality as a "dysfunction of the brain" which is commonly "a symptom of spiritual despair."

==== Transgender issues ====
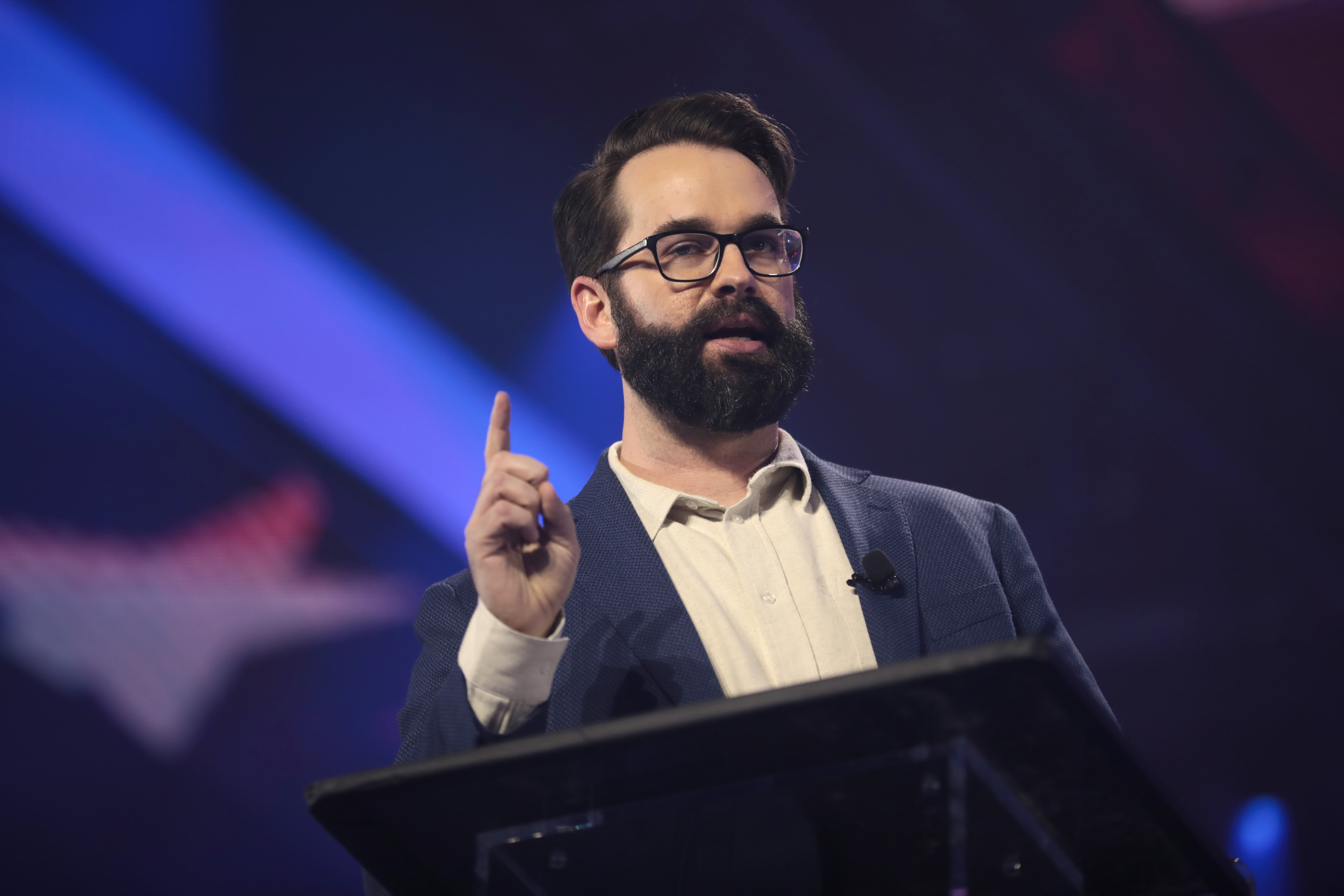
Walsh speaking at the 2022 AmericaFest in Phoenix, Arizona

Walsh has repeatedly opposed the transgender community and "gender ideology", notably with his children's book Johnny the Walrus, his documentary What Is a Woman?, and campaigns involving hospitals and schools. Walsh and his campaigns are sometimes described as anti-trans and transphobic. Progressive magazine The New Republic named Walsh "Transphobe of the Year" in 2022, saying he "has made a name for himself by demonizing medical professionals and pushing conspiracy theories about 'grooming' and pedophilia in the LGBTQ community". Walsh has referred to being transgender as a "delusion" and a "mental illness". He has argued that transgender people cannot "defend the logic of trans ideology" and that they have "embarked on a campaign to restructure all of human society". Walsh argues that biological sex is what determines if someone is a man or a woman. He has said that "I truly see the fight against gender ideology as the last stand for Western civilization... Because if the sane side loses this, it's over."

Walsh has compared giving hormone treatments and gender-affirming surgery for transgender youth to "being sexually violated in a way that is just as depraved or damaging as molestation or rape". In May 2021, Walsh described doctors who perform gender-affirming surgeries for transgender youth as "Nazi scientist-evil", "pedophiles", and "plastic surgeons basically acting like Leatherface from The Texas Chain Saw Massacre". He has referred to transgender surgeries as "castration", and called to make them illegal.

Walsh rented an apartment in Virginia for one day in 2021 to qualify to speak out against the Loudoun County School Board for allowing transgender students the use of restrooms matching their gender identity. During his speech, which he later featured in his film What Is a Woman?, Walsh said: "You are all child abusers. You prey upon impressionable children and indoctrinate them into your insane ideological cult, a cult which holds many fanatical views but none so deranged as the idea that boys are girls and girls are boys."

In January 2022, Twitter suspended Walsh's account for 12 hours for tweets it deemed as hateful content against transgender people. In October 2022, Walsh encouraged his followers to misgender transgender people, writing that "we have made huge strides against the trans agenda", and that the acquisition of Twitter by Elon Musk, which he called "the liberation of Twitter", will allow them to "ramp up our efforts even more".

In November 2022, Walsh was challenged as a guest on the podcast The Joe Rogan Experience for suggesting that "maybe millions of kids" had been put onto puberty blockers. Producer Jamie Vernon interjected and stated that only 4,780 children had been put on puberty blockers within the past five years. Walsh lowered his guess to "hundreds of thousands" and said he "could be wrong", adding, "who are you gonna trust when they're telling you the numbers?"

In February 2023, Walsh said he "would rather be dead" than have a trans child.

===== Campaigns against hospitals providing transgender health care =====
In 2022, Walsh campaigned against hospitals providing transgender health care for youth. Boston Children's Hospital, one of the hospitals denounced by Walsh and other right-wing figures, reported harassment, death threats, and a hoax bomb threat in August 2022 that led to a woman's arrest in September.

In September 2022, Walsh made accusations against another hospital, Vanderbilt University Medical Center (VUMC), and its transgender clinic in Nashville, Tennessee. Walsh said on his show that VUMC doctors "castrate" and "drug and mutilate" children. He said on Twitter that VUMC considered transgender health care a "money-maker", that it threatened "consequences" for medical staff who declined to provide care, and that it tried to "enforce compliance" from hesitant parents of transgender youth. Walsh criticized VUMC's "trans buddies" program and called its patient advocates "trans activists". The New Republic described the accusations by Walsh as "cherry-picking informational content" and noted that Walsh had singled out doctors by name. Tennessee Governor Bill Lee and other Republicans in the state called for an investigation into the hospital. Walsh tweeted about meeting with Tennessee lawmakers on a bill to shut down the clinic. VUMC reported harassment and threats against its staff, and there were calls for murders and arrests of VUMC doctors in far-right groups on Reddit and 4chan. Vanderbilt took down its webpage about the clinic and said that Walsh had "misrepresent[ed] facts about the care" it provides. On October 7, 2022, VUMC announced that it would pause gender-affirming surgeries for minors and review its practices. Since 2018, VUMC provided an average of five such surgeries to minors annually. All patients were over 16-years-old and obtained parental consent. None had received genital surgery.

On October 21, 2022, Walsh spoke at a Nashville rally that he organized with The Daily Wire called "The Rally to End Child Mutilation". The goal of the rally was to speak out in opposition to transgender health care for minors. During his speech, Walsh claimed that there was a conspiracy to indoctrinate children into a cult of "gender ideology" and called it a battle of good vs evil. Besides Walsh there were 11 other speakers at the rally including, Tennessee Republican state senator Jack Johnson, representative William Lamberth, senator Marsha Blackburn, and former congresswoman Tulsi Gabbard, Mark Meckler, Robby Starbuck, Landon Starbuck, activist Chloe Cole, Scott Newgent, Colin Wright, and Christiana Kiefer. The rally also drew between 1,500 and 3,000 people, including supporters and protesters.

===== Campaign against Eli Erlick =====
In August 2022, Matt Walsh accused transgender activist Eli Erlick of being a "confessed drug dealer" after she proposed in a post on Instagram that she might distribute surplus hormone therapy prescriptions to transgender youth in states restricting gender-affirming care. Walsh reported Erlick to the University of California, Santa Cruz, where she was a PhD candidate. When the university did not respond within a day, publicized administrators' contact details while threatening further escalation and protest. The university reaffirmed its support for transgender community members and stated it takes allegations of illegal activity and harassment seriously. Some conservative commentators reported Erlick to the U.S. Drug Enforcement Administration.

=== Politicians ===
After South Dakota Governor Kristi Noem permitted businesses to require a COVID-19 vaccine for their employees, Walsh criticized her by writing that she was only considered a frontrunner for the 2024 United States presidential election because of her physical attractiveness. After Noem called his comment misogynistic, Walsh said he had no regrets but would "accept apologies from all of the performative idiots pretending to be offended by it".

When U.S. representative Alexandria Ocasio-Cortez tweeted photos of her grandmother's house in Puerto Rico that was unrepaired in 2021, four years after Hurricane Maria, and blamed former President Donald Trump for not doing enough to help the recovery, Walsh criticized Ocasio-Cortez for not providing the money herself. He launched a crowdfunding effort to pay for the repairs and raised $100,000 in the first 24 hours, reaching the set goal of $48,990, but the grandmother refused the funds and GoFundMe shut the effort down after raising $104,000, with all of the money being returned to the donors. Ocasio-Cortez responded to the criticism by saying, "My abuela (Spanish: "grandmother") is okay ... but instead of only caring for mine & letting others suffer, I'm calling attention to the systemic injustices you seem totally fine [with] in having a US colony."

Walsh criticized Donald Trump in November 2022 for nicknaming Republican Florida governor Ron DeSantis "Ron DeSanctimonious" ahead of the November 2022 midterm elections.

=== Foreign aid ===
In January 2025, Walsh argued that the United States government should cut off foreign aid for all countries, including Israel, stating in a tweet that: "Countries that cannot function without US foreign aid should simply not exist. You have no right to exist as a nation if your existence depends on forced donations from the citizens of another country. Take away all foreign aid permanently and let the chips fall where they may". In response to the post, Jeremy Boreing, then CEO of The Daily Wire, put out a tweet stating his disagreement with Walsh, indicating that he thought Israel should receive American aid, but that it was not a problem that they disagreed.

=== Entertainment media ===
After the casting of Halle Bailey in the 2023 live-action version of The Little Mermaid, Walsh stated, "from a scientific perspective, it doesn't make a lot of sense to have someone with darker skin who lives deep in the ocean," and suggested that the mermaid should be translucent instead. Later, Walsh said that "Translucent rights are human rights". He called anime "satanic" in an answer to viewers' questions in one of his videos, adding "I have no argument for why it's satanic. It just seems that way to me."

== Books ==
- The Unholy Trinity: Blocking the Left's Assault on Life, Marriage, and Gender. New York: Crown Publishing Group (2017). ISBN 978-0-45149505-1, 0-45149505-5.
- Church of Cowards: A Wake-Up Call to Complacent Christians. Washington, DC: Regnery Gateway (2020). ISBN 978-1-62157920-5. OCLC 1141857412.
- Johnny the Walrus. Illustrations by K. Reece. Nashville, TN: DW Books (2022). ISBN 978-1-95600705-3, 1-95600704-0.
- What Is a Woman?: One Man's Journey to Answer the Question of a Generation. Nashville, TN: DW Books (2022). ISBN 978-1-95600700-8. OCLC 1322213918.

== Filmography ==
Year	Title	Type	Role	Notes
2022	What Is a Woman?	Documentary	Himself	
2023	Chip Chilla	TV series	Tyrant Rex	
2023	Lady Ballers	Film	Kris Dilby/Himself	
2024	Am I Racist?	Documentary	Himself	

== See also ==
- 2020s anti-LGBTQ movement in the United States
- Transphobia in the United States § Transphobia in US culture
