= Johnny the Walrus =

2022 children's book by Matt Walsh

- Author: Matt Walsh
- Illustrator: K. Reece
- Language: English
- Genre: Children's literature
- Publisher: DW Books
- Publication date: March 29, 2022
- Publication place: United States
- Media type: Print (hardcover)
- Pages: 30
- ISBN: 978-1-956007-05-3

Johnny the Walrus is a satirical 2022 children's picture book by American conservative political commentator Matt Walsh. The story allegorically compares being transgender and non-binary to pretending to be a walrus through the story of a child named Johnny. It was published by DW Books, a division of The Daily Wire.

== Summary ==
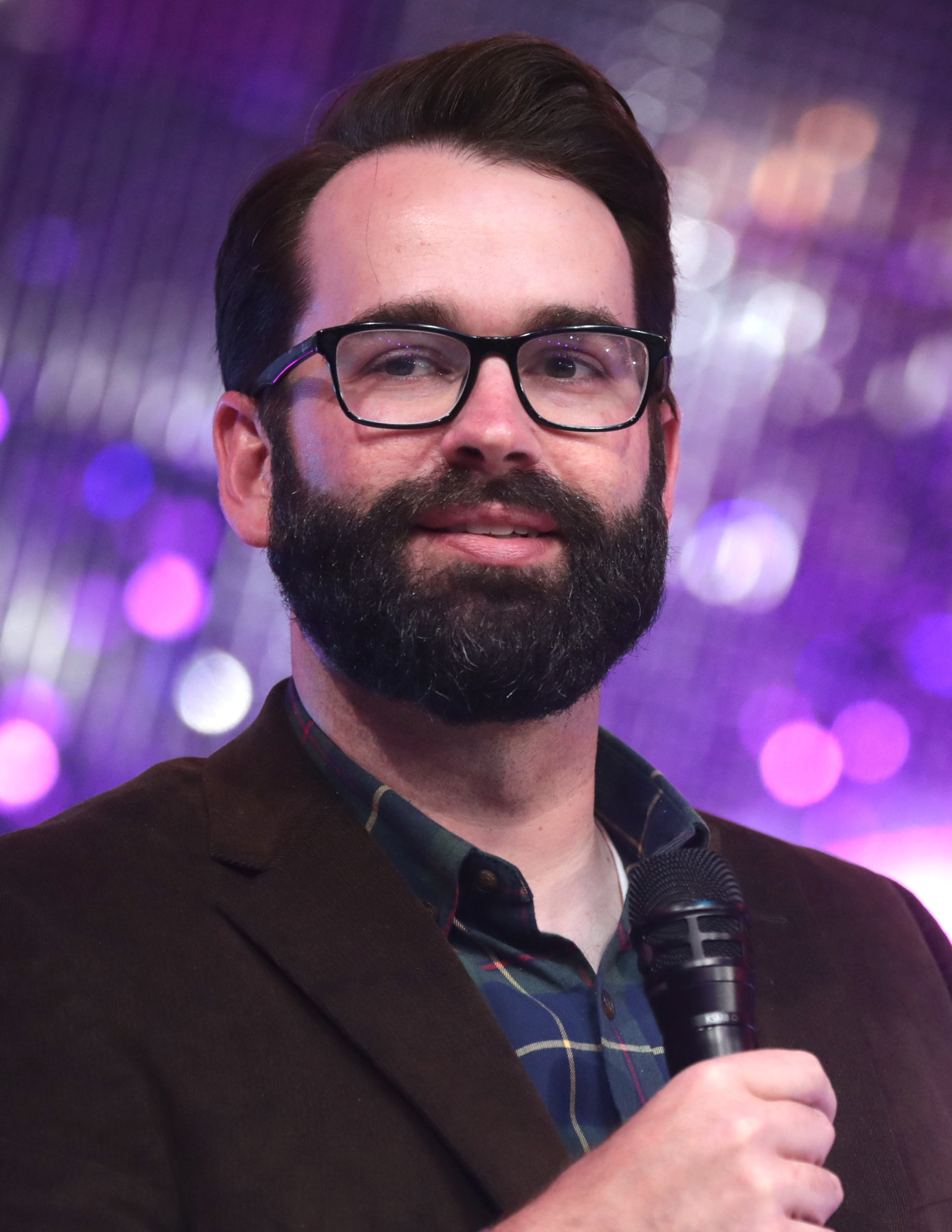
Author Matt Walsh in 2022

In the book, Johnny is a boy with an imagination who dresses up as a walrus by using spoons as tusks. When "internet people" find out that Johnny enjoys being a walrus, he is forced to decide between being a boy or a walrus, and he is not allowed to change his mind. The "internet people" also pressure Johnny's mother into feeding Johnny worms and taking him to a doctor with a saw, who suggests turning Johnny's hands and feet into fins. Johnny's mother attempts to take him to a zoo to be with real walruses, but the real walruses do not like Johnny as he is not a walrus. The zoo also refuses to accept Johnny. Eventually, Johnny and his mother realize Johnny is a boy and that it is OK to play pretend while being yourself. They head home as Johnny pretends to be a bird.

== Reception ==
Johnny the Walrus became the bestselling book in Amazon's LGBTQ+ category before Amazon recategorized it in December 2021 to the Political and Social Commentary category. Fox News host Tucker Carlson called the book "hilarious". Conservative news website TheBlaze called it "an effort to push back against radical gender ideology which defies biological reality". Satirist Andrew Doyle, writing in UnHerd, praised the book for mocking the "indoctrination of the young". LGBT news website PinkNews called the book "hateful" and "transphobic". LGBTQ Nation called the book "anti-transgender" and said that the book mocks transgender youth.

== See also ==
- What Is a Woman?, a 2022 documentary by Walsh about transgender issues in which he asks the titular question to various people
- "Mr. Garrison's Fancy New Vagina", an episode of South Park featuring a character transitioning into a dolphin as a satire on transgender issues
