= Brett Cooper (commentator) =

American political commentator (born 2001)

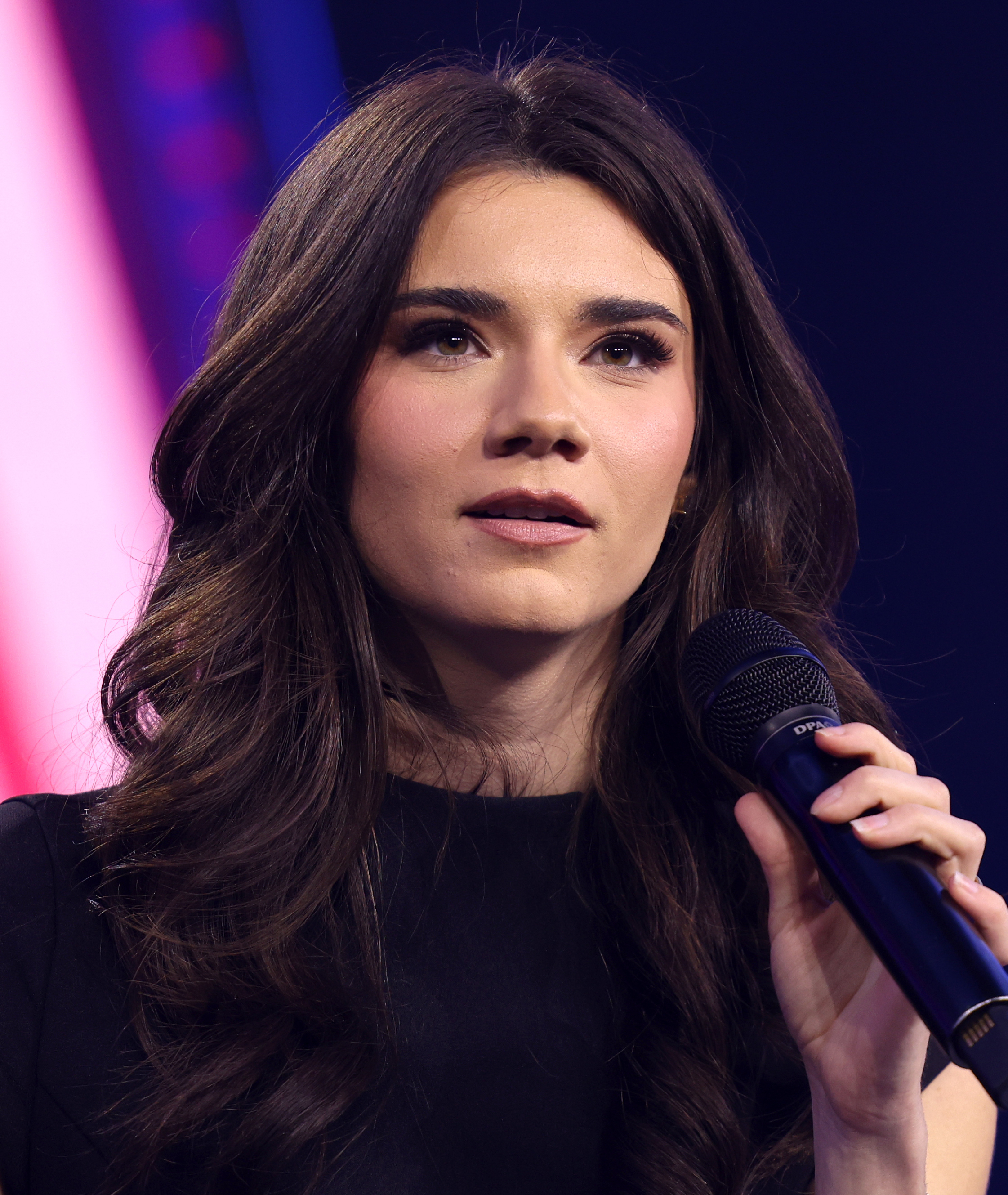
- Cooper in 2024
- Born: October 12, 2001 (age 25); Bellingham, Washington, U.S.
- Education: University of California, Los Angeles (BA)
- Occupations: Political commentator; actress
- Years active: 2012–present
- Organization: Fox News
- Spouse: Alex Tombul (m. 2024)
- Children: 1

YouTube information
- Channel: Brett Cooper
- Years active: 2024–present
- Genres: Reaction; politics; popular culture
- Subscribers: 1.7 million
- Views: 223.9 million
- Last updated: September 27, 2026
- Website: brettcooper.com

Brett Tombul (née Cooper; born October 12, 2001) is an American conservative political commentator. She hosted the YouTube channel The Comments Section with Brett Cooper, produced by The Daily Wire, from March 2022 until December 2024. Since January 2025, she hosts The Brett Cooper Show, produced independently on her own channel. Cooper is also a contributor to Fox News and its sibling channels, having signed with them in summer 2025.

== Early life and education ==
Cooper was born on October 12, 2001, in Bellingham, Washington. She has Dutch ancestry. She was raised in Chattanooga, Tennessee. In 2007, one of her older twin brothers died from cardiac arrest during rowing practice at McCallie School. When she was ten years of age, she relocated to Los Angeles, California, where she began to pursue a career in the entertainment industry.

Cooper was home-schooled for most of her childhood. At fifteen years of age, she emancipated herself, owing to her parents' divorce and her older brother's drug addiction and schizophrenia diagnosis; she hired her own lawyer and supported herself by working at Trader Joe's. She studied at the University of California, Los Angeles (UCLA), graduating with an undergraduate degree in English literature. She also completed the BASE (Business for Arts, Sciences, and Engineering) summer program through UC Berkeley's Haas School of Business.

== Career ==
=== Early work (2012–2022) ===
For almost ten years, Cooper had roles in the entertainment industry. She participated in films and television series, including two credits on the Amazon Original children's show Gortimer Gibbon's Life on Normal Street. She first gained attention as a UCLA student who criticized COVID lockdowns.

As an actress, Cooper starred in three films and five television series before signing with The Daily Wire, a conservative media company co-founded by conservative activists Ben Shapiro and Jeremy Boreing. Cooper has written for the Foundation for Economic Education and was an ambassador for PragerU and Turning Point USA.

=== The Comments Section with Brett Cooper (2022–2024) ===
In January 2022, Cooper signed with The Daily Wire to start a new podcast called The Comments Section. Grayson Quay, in a March 30, 2022, piece for The Week, described Cooper's show as "aim[ing] to capture a Gen Z audience on TikTok and YouTube." Rachel Leishman, writing for The Mary Sue in October 2023, argued that "The trailer for the show sets it up as if she is reading comments and making a statement on what 'leftists' are saying or pushing back against liberal ideals, but in reality, she just picks a topic of conversation and shares her opinions." Also in October 2023, Jeremy Boreing, then a co-CEO of The Daily Wire, announced that Bentkey, the company's new kids‑streaming platform, would produce a live‑action film titled Snow White and the Evil Queen with Cooper starring as Snow White. A teaser was released around the same time.

On October 26, 2024, Cooper's producer, Reagan Conrad, was a guest host on her show. Conrad's guest hosting duties increased steadily, and she went on to replace Cooper as regular host of The Comments Section after the latter's departure on December 10, 2024. Cooper stated that the decision to leave the media group was her own.

=== Independent media ventures (2024–2025) ===
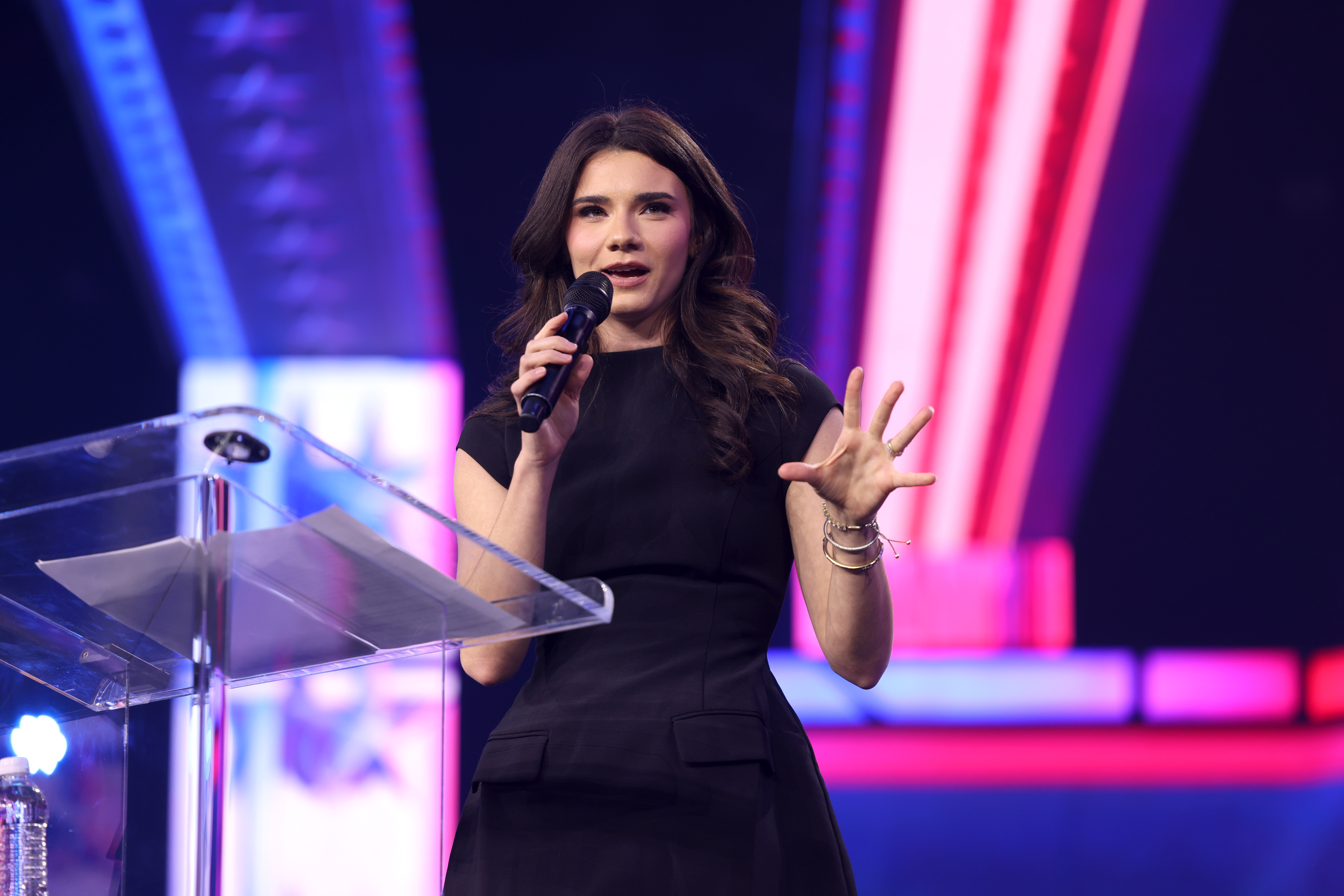
Cooper speaking with attendees at 2024 AmericaFest, which was held at the Phoenix Convention Center in Phoenix, Arizona

Within a few weeks of her exit from The Daily Wire, Cooper spoke at Turning Point USA's annual AmericaFest (AmFest) Conference in Phoenix, Arizona. During her speech, she thanked fans and attendees for their support of her career. Afterward, she hosted a meet-and-greet with fans.

On January 27, 2025, Cooper posted her first video on her new YouTube channel: a trailer for her new program, The Brett Cooper Show. Its first episode premiered on January 30. Cooper interviewed former U.S. Navy SEAL and podcaster Shawn Ryan, and fellow conservative commentator Amir Odom. On her show, she has criticized the feminist movement, abortion and what she refers to as "transgenderism."

=== Fox News contributor (2025–present) ===
On June 25, 2025, Fox News Media announced that it had signed Cooper as a contributor. Under the multi-platform agreement, she is expected to provide cultural, social, and political commentary across Fox News Channel, Fox Business, and the network’s digital outlets. Cooper made her on-air debut later that afternoon on The Will Cain Show.

In December 2025, Cooper defended far-right activist Nick Fuentes after Republican senator Ted Cruz called him a Nazi, stating that it was incorrect for Cruz to use that label. In an interview with NPR, she defended Fuentes' right to speak. Though she stated that she did not "agree with Nick Fuentes on everything", she refused to condemn him. When asked if she agreed with Fuentes' claim that "Jewish gangsters" run the country, she replied: "Not really. I am concerned about the impact of Israel in our country."

== Personal life ==
In October 2023, Cooper became engaged to Alex Tombul, the founder of an advertising agency. They married in April 2024. The couple live on a farm outside of Nashville, Tennessee.

On May 7, 2025, Cooper announced on Instagram that she and Tombul were expecting their first child, a son who was then born on September 7.

== Filmography ==
=== Film ===
Year	Title	Role	Notes
2012	Parental Guidance	Speech Student	Uncredited
2017	Bobbi & Gill	Bobbi Gareth	—
2023	Lady Ballers	Stacey Santiago O'Brien	—
2025	500 Fireflies	June	

=== Television ===
Year	Title	Role	Notes
2016	Gortimer Gibbon's Life on Normal Street	Jessica	2 episodes
2017	Shots Fired	Tess Breeland	4 episodes
2018	Heathers	Brianna Parker/"Trailer Parker"	8 episodes
2023	Chip Chilla	Ellen Squirrel (voice)	Episode: "Chip's Odyssey"
2024	Mr. Birchum	Jeanie Birchum (voice)	Supporting role
2026	The Pendragon Cycle: Rise of the Merlin	Ganieda	5 episodes
