= The Comments Section =

American conservative political show

- Also known as: The Comments Section with Reagan Conrad (December 2024–2026); The Comments Section with Brett Cooper (May 2022–December 2024)
- Genre: Political commentary; news
- Created by: The Daily Wire
- Presented by: Brett Cooper (2022–2024); Reagan Conrad (2024–present)
- Country of origin: United States

Production
- Production location: Nashville, Tennessee
- Camera setup: Single-camera
- Running time: 5–20 minutes
- Production company: The Daily Wire

Original release
- Network: The Daily Wire; YouTube
- Release: March 2, 2022 – May 7, 2026

Related
- The Ben Shapiro Show

The Comments Section is an American daily conservative news and viral content review podcast produced by The Daily Wire and hosted by Reagan Conrad. It was hosted by political commentator Brett Cooper from March 2, 2022, to December 10, 2024.

The show is presented as a vlog, with the host reviewing current events, news stories, and viral videos and trends and providing their commentary and opinion on them. Episodes are generally 5 to 20 minutes, with each video generally being about one subject. Episodes are generally released every weekday.

== History ==
=== Brett Cooper ===
In late 2021, conservative news and media company The Daily Wire sought "to capture a Gen Z audience on TikTok and YouTube." Brett Cooper, at that time an actress, was hired by The Daily Wire in January 2022 to start a podcast called The Comments Section with Brett Cooper.

The show was a success, reaching 4.5 million subscribers at its peak. Due to the show's success, in October 2023, Daily Wire CEO Jeremy Boreing announced that Cooper was set to star in a live‑action film titled Snow White and the Evil Queen as Snow White. A teaser was released around the same time, but as of January 2025, the plans were cancelled.

On October 25, 2024, Cooper's producer and friend, Reagan Conrad, was a guest host on her show. On the December 10, 2024 episode, Cooper announced that it would be her final episode hosting and that Conrad would be replacing her.

Despite speculation of a falling out between Cooper and Conrad as well as between Cooper and The Daily Wire, Cooper announced that the decision was her own. Despite these statements made by Cooper herself, the specific details surrounding the breakup “remain murky”. Cooper began to focus on her own YouTube channel, and in June 2025 was added as a contributor to Fox News.

=== Host transition and conclusion ===
Following Brett Cooper's departure from the show and The Daily Wire in December 2024, her former producer Reagan Conrad assumed the role of permanent host. Under Conrad's tenure, the show's branding shifted to The Comments Section with Reagan Conrad. However, the host transition was accompanied by a significant and sustained decline in audience engagement. Despite the channel retaining a subscriber base of over 3.5 million, average viewership per video fell by more than 90%, with individual uploads frequently struggling to surpass 20,000 to 30,000 views.

The final regular video upload to The Comments Section YouTube channel occurred on May 7, 2026, generating 25,272 views as of July 1, 2026. The Daily Wire did not issue a formal cancellation announcement and Conrad announced on the channel that she is on maternity leave.
