= Terror on the Prairie =

2022 film by Michael Polish

- Film poster
- Directed by: Michael Polish
- Written by: Josiah Nelson
- Produced by: Jeremy Boreing; Gina Carano; Dallas Sonnier; Amanda Presmyk
- Starring: Gina Carano; Donald Cerrone; Tyler Fischer; Gabriel-Kane Day-Lewis; Rhys Jackson Becker; Matthias Hues; Samaire Armstrong; Heath Freeman; Nick Searcy
- Cinematography: Steeven Petitteville
- Edited by: Paul Buhl
- Music by: Dalal Bruchmann; Maesa Pullman
- Production companies: The Daily Wire; Bonfire Legend
- Distributed by: The Daily Wire
- Release date: June 14, 2022
- Running time: 107 minutes
- Country: United States
- Language: English
- Budget: $2 million
- Box office: $13,115

Terror on the Prairie is a 2022 American Western film directed by Michael Polish and written by Josiah Nelson. It was produced by The Daily Wire and Bonfire Legend, and distributed by The Daily Wire and Voltage Pictures. The film follows a family of pioneers as they defend themselves from a gang of outlaws on the Montana plains. The film features the cast of Gina Carano as Hattie McAllister, Donald Cerrone as Jeb McAllister, and Nick Searcy starring as The Captain, with Rhys Jackson Becker, Gabriel-Kane Day Lewis, Tyler Fischer, Heath Freeman, Samaire Armstrong, and Matthias Hues all featured in supporting roles.

Terror on the Prairie was released direct to streaming on The Daily Wire on June 14, 2022. Its international theatrical gross was $13,115 from a limited release.

== Plot ==
Roughly a decade after the end of the Civil War, veteran Jeb McAllister and his wife Hattie struggle to raise their adolescent son Will and infant daughter in the wilds of Montana. Hattie is disillusioned with the drudgery of frontier life and wants to move back east to her parents' land, while Jeb wants to be self-reliant and capable of raising their family on their own. After Jeb leaves to go to town to find work so they can raise money for traveling, four strangers arrive and ask Hattie for some food and water. A short time later she finds human scalps tied to their saddles, so she draws a shotgun on the men and kicks them out of her home.

However, the outlaws, led by "The Captain", do not go far. Instead, a stand-off begins after the men repeatedly attempt to break into the McAllister cabin but are foiled by Hattie and Will, with one outlaw being killed. As night falls, Hattie realizes that the reason the outlaws are unwilling to leave is that they are looking for Jeb (who is still in town) and want to use her and their children as bait. Jeb, meanwhile, after failing to find any work and spending the evening drinking in a saloon, notices wanted posters of the men and recognizes them from his past during the war. Jeb rushes back to the cabin and finds it on fire. He helps his family slip away and they attempt to hide in the wilderness.

Will manages to hide with his baby sister, but Hattie is captured by the outlaws. Jeb tries to save her but he is also captured and the pair are taken back to their burned out cabin. The Captain turns out to be Jeb's former commander in the Confederate Army. He wants Jeb to pay for accidentally killing his only daughter after betraying him and his family to Union soldiers during the war. Jeb and Hattie are dragged out to face a lynching. However, Hattie tricks the Captain into leaving her alone with one of his men; when he tries to rape her she draws a hidden knife and kills him. Arming herself with a rifle, Hattie emerges from the cabin, and after a brief shoot-out, she kills the Captain and Jeb kills the remaining outlaw. The McAllister family rebuilds their cabin with money from the bounty on the dead outlaws.

== Cast ==
- Gina Carano as Hattie McAllister
- Donald Cerrone as Jeb McAllister
- Tyler Fischer as Long Hair
- Gabriel-Kane Day-Lewis as The Kid
- Rhys Jackson Becker as Will McAllister
- Matthias Hues as Mr. Samuelson
- Samaire Armstrong as Soiled Dove
- Heath Freeman as Gold Teeth (Note: The end credits include a dedication to Freeman.)
- Nick Searcy as The Captain

Additionally, Travis Mills, Izzy Marshall, Jeremy Gauna, and Thomas White Eagle are among the supporting cast.

== Production ==
=== Development ===
On February 12, 2021, Deadline Hollywood reported that Gina Carano was set to develop, produce, and star in an upcoming film, which The Daily Wire would release exclusively to its members. The original plan had been to adapt the book "White Knuckle" by Eric Red but that project was pushed back in favor of making Terror on the Prairie instead. The film was produced as part of The Daily Wire's partnership with producer Dallas Sonnier and his Bonfire Legend banner.

=== Filming ===
Principal photography took place in Chico, Montana and Livingston, Montana from October 11 to November 5, 2021. The locations used for Terror on the Prairie were primarily based in Montana.

== Marketing ==
On February 10, 2022, The Daily Wire promoted Terror on the Prairie by releasing the first image of the film, whilst debuting a 60-second trailer, with a reveal that accompanied the launch of their other film, Shut In (2022). On June 1, 2022, they released a full-length trailer.

== Release ==
On June 14, 2022, Terror on the Prairie released exclusively to online subscribers of The Daily Wire.

The film grossed $804 during its one day US theatrical release. The film also had a limited theatrical release in the United Arab Emirates and Russia where it earned a total of $13,115.

== Reception ==
On the review aggregator website Rotten Tomatoes, 80% of 5 critics' reviews are positive, with an average rating of 7.2/10.

Jorge Castillo of Starburst gave it 2 out of 5 and was positive about director Michael Polish but critical of Carano's central performance, and stated that "The most interesting aspect of Terror on the Prairie has little to do with the movie itself."

Writing for The New York Times, Joseph Bernstein saw the film as an example of a recent conservative trend in American cinema.

IndieWire noted that it performed poorly at the box office in its limited theatrical release because it did not reach its target audience.
