= Am I Racist? =

2024 American documentary starring Matt Walsh

- Theatrical release poster
- Directed by: Justin Folk
- Written by: Justin Folk; Brian Hoffman; Matt Walsh; Dallas Sonnier
- Produced by: Justin Folk; Charlotte Roland; Brian Hoffman; Matt Walsh; Benyam Capel
- Starring: Matt Walsh
- Cinematography: Anton Seim
- Edited by: Marshall Lee
- Music by: Uncle Chubbz
- Production companies: Daily Wire Studios; Digital Astronaut
- Distributed by: SDG Releasing
- Release date: September 13, 2024
- Running time: 101 minutes
- Country: United States
- Language: English
- Budget: $3 million
- Box office: $12.3 million

Am I Racist? is a 2024 American satirical documentary comedy film starring conservative political commentator Matt Walsh as a "bumbling DEI trainee" investigating the diversity, equity, and inclusion (DEI) industry. It is Walsh's follow-up to his 2022 documentary What Is a Woman?

The film features unscripted vignettes of Walsh interviewing and interacting with real-life DEI consultants and anti-racism educators — among them author Robin DiAngelo and educators Regina Jackson and Saira Rao — who are unaware of his true identity. Produced by The Daily Wire with executive producers including Ben Shapiro and Jeremy Boreing, the film has been widely compared to Borat in its use of subterfuge and ambush-style comedy.

The film was theatrically released in the United States on September 13, 2024. It had a production budget of $3 million and grossed $12.3 million, making it the highest-grossing documentary film of 2024.

== Plot ==
Matt Walsh, reflecting on the past and present state of racism in society, decides to engage with anti-racism experts and activists. After being ousted from a support group focused on "white guilt," Walsh decides to take on a persona similar to that of the gender studies professor he interviewed in What Is a Woman? He goes on to receive a DEI certification, and assumes the identity of a "DEI expert."

Subsequently, Walsh convinces passersby to sign a petition to rename the Washington Monument the "George Floyd Monument," raise the structure by 30 percent, and repaint it black. He also goes to a biker bar, hoping to expose the racism of white "hillbillies." At the same time, he interviews black Americans who tell him that the solution to racism is to "love one another."

The show culminates in Walsh's assumed persona hosting a workshop called the "Do the Work Workshop," where he condemns his uncle Frank for a racist joke he made twenty years ago. Towards the end of the workshop, Walsh eventually concedes self-flagellation as a solution to white guilt. The show ends with Walsh dramatically having a change of heart and ending the workshop, stating publicly that the whole thing is a scam. In the final scene, Walsh imagines himself sharing his findings with the world before sitting down for coffee with his uncle Frank.

== Production and release ==
Am I Racist? is the second film by Walsh, and had a budget of $3 million. Walsh is a right-wing podcaster, author, and provocateur with a large following. Jeremy Boreing, co-CEO of The Daily Wire, said the film was made because "DEI culture is one of the most toxic plagues in American life."

Robin DiAngelo, the author of White Fragility who appears in the film, said the filmmakers "had lied about their agenda and I had been played," specifically in a scene involving reparations. Another scene, in which Walsh went without a physical disguise while posing as an attendee of a DEI workshop, ended as the real attendees recognized Walsh.

The film was released in the United States and Canada on September 13, 2024, by SDG Releasing. It is the first theatrically released film by The Daily Wire. On October 28, 2024, the film came to DailyWire+.

== Reception ==
=== Box office ===
Am I Racist grossed $12.3 million. It was the highest-grossing documentary film of 2024.

The film made $1.96 million on its opening day, including Thursday night previews. It went on to debut to $4.54 million from 1,517 theaters in its opening weekend, finishing third at the box office. It had the third-biggest opening weekend for a documentary in the past decade, and the top opening for a political documentary since Fahrenheit 9/11 in 2004, according to The Hollywood Reporter. In its second weekend the film made $2.5 million (a drop of 41%), finishing in seventh, and then on its third weekend, it made $1.1 million (a drop of 55%), finishing in twelfth.

=== Critical response ===
On the review aggregator website Rotten Tomatoes, 56% of 16 critics' reviews are positive, with an average rating of 7/10. Audiences polled by CinemaScore gave the film an average grade of "A" on an A+ to F scale, while those surveyed by PostTrak gave it an average five out of five stars.

Walsh wrote on X during the opening weekend of the film that no mainstream film critics had yet reviewed it. He said that an early screener of the film was offered to mainstream outlets but had no taker, and that independent critics had written to him refusing to review the film.

Tatiana Siegel wrote in Variety that the film is "either hilarious or offensive, depending on which side of the MAGA fence you sit on." Vinson Cunningham in The New Yorker wrote that while Walsh appeared "stunningly fluent" in DEI jargon, the movie missed deeper complexities of racial discourse, and called Walsh "as much of a grifter" as the most "shameless" consultants he critiques. Jason L. Riley, in the Opinion section of the The Wall Street Journal, wrote that "you'll laugh a lot" and that Walsh's approach "exposes the DEI industry by letting practitioners discredit themselves." Tom Joyce of the NewBostonPost described the film as "compelling and funny" and that "Walsh makes a mockery of the diversity, equity, and inclusion industry and exposes it as yet another exercise in capitalism." Megan McArdle, in the Opinion section of The Washington Post, argued that "you might not enjoy" Am I Racist? but "should watch it anyway."

Joel Stein reviewed the film for The Hollywood Reporter and said the film "feels like a comedy made by an alien who's seen comedies." Commenting on Walsh's performance, Stein wrote he "lacks some of the skills of a comedian, such as being funny."

Denny Burk in the Christian magazine World wrote that he supports exposing "DEI lunacy," but said a dispute between Robin DiAngelo and Walsh indicated that the filmmakers' methods may have included "deception and lying when doing so for an ostensibly good cause."
