= Lady Ballers =

2023 film by Jeremy Boreing

- Teaser poster
- Directed by: Jeremy Boreing
- Written by: Jeremy Boreing; Brian Hoffman; Nick Sheehan
- Produced by: Jeremy Boreing; Dallas Sonnier
- Starring: Jeremy Boreing; Billie Rae Brandt; Daniel Considine; Jake Crain; David Cone; Blain Crain
- Cinematography: Kristopher Kimlin
- Edited by: Jared Bently
- Music by: Will Boreing
- Production company: Bonfire Legend
- Distributed by: The Daily Wire
- Release date: December 1, 2023
- Running time: 110 minutes
- Country: United States
- Language: English

Lady Ballers is a 2023 American sports comedy film starring, directed and co-written by Jeremy Boreing, former co-CEO of conservative media company The Daily Wire. It also stars Daniel Considine, David Cone, Tyler Fischer and Daily Wire hosts Jake and Blain Crain. Boreing plays a down-on-his-luck-coach who will do anything to win, even bring his old male basketball team together to compete in women's sports.

The film has cameos from Daily Wire contributors and other prominent right-wing figures. Senator Ted Cruz, actress and YouTuber Brett Cooper, political commentator Candace Owens, and former competitive swimmer Riley Gaines all made cameo appearances as themselves. Daily Wire's Ben Shapiro, Matt Walsh, Michael Knowles, Andrew Klavan, and Jordan Peterson all make appearances. The film is the debut of Billie Rae Brandt and Rosie Seraphine Harper.

== Plot ==
In 2008, coach Rob Gibson leads his high school boys' basketball team to victory in a third back-to-back state championship in Nashville. Fifteen years later, Rob finds himself in the midst of a divorce and is fired from his coaching position. Desperate, Rob accepts a job at a drag queen restaurant, where he finds his former star point guard, Alex Cruise, also working. Rob begins coaching Alex to compete in a track and field competition for money.

After Alex is mistakenly believed to be transgender, Rob convinces him to compete in the women's competition. Alex easily wins every event, gaining the attention of local reporter, Gwen Wilde, who persuades them to work with her as a means to become famous.

Rob and Alex reassemble their championship basketball team to compete in a women's basketball league as transgender athletes. Initially skeptical, the team is convinced of the plan by Rob's 8-year-old daughter, after she explains gender identity concepts to them.

The Lady Ballers dominate their opponents, quickly gaining celebrity status. Gwen comes on to Rob sexually. Their newfound fame soon causes the team to play in all women's sports and little girls' sports, and Rob's actions strain his already fragile relationship with his disapproving ex-wife, especially after his daughter tells him she wants to be a boy because boys are winners. However, he assures her that girls are better than men at things such as building community, raising families and encouraging civility, telling her, "no women, no world".

When Alex tells Rob that he is beginning to believe he is actually transgender, Rob physically assaults him, striking him in the genitals. Rob asks Gwen if their actions are negatively affecting the female athletes, and an angry Gwen orchestrates a plan to put the Lady Ballers up against a team of African American men who also claim to be transgender.

The Lady Ballers find themselves losing badly at halftime and, after Gwen attempts to kill Rob with a sniper rifle, he arranges for his daughter and a team of her friends to replace the Lady Ballers. The opposing team plays lightheartedly against the little girls, letting them pass to each other and lifting them up to slam dunk the ball, but still wins by 400 points. Rob reconciles with his ex-wife and the Lady Ballers officially disband. Rob builds a recreation center for little girls and it is revealed that Rob's ex-wife's hippie boyfriend is actually Matt Walsh, having orchestrated their reconciliation for the "sake of the child."

In a post-credits scene, Alex is participating in talk therapy with Jordan Peterson.

== Cast ==
- Jeremy Boreing as Coach Rob Gibson
- Daniel Considine as Alex Cruise
- Jake Crain as Jake Crain
- David Cone as David/Davida Cone
- Blain Crain as Blain/Blair Crain
- Tyler Fischer as Felix/Shelix Vanwyk
- Billie Rae Brandt as Gwen Wilde
- Lexie Contursi as Dharby Gibson
- Rosie Seraphine Harper as Winnie Gibson
- Matt Walsh as Kris Dilby/Himself
- Ben Shapiro as the Ref
- Candace Owens as herself
- Brett Cooper as Stacey Santiago O'Brien
- Michael Knowles as Drake Diamond
- Andrew Klavan as himself
- Spencer Klavan as The Peacemaker
- Clay Travis as the Hawkettes Coach
- Seth Dillon as the Cowgirls Coach
- Riley Gaines as herself
- Ted Cruz as himself
- Jordan Peterson as himself
- Chandler Juliet as Sheila
- Kangmin Lee as An Ecstatic Fan
- Siaka Massaquoi as Deuce Johnson
- Ben Davies as Commercial Director
- John Costellow as Basketball fan

== Production ==
The premise of Lady Ballers originated as a potential documentary in which men would pretend to be transgender and attempt to infiltrate women's sports, but the Daily Wire changed the concept to a fictional comedy as women's leagues do not let in men. Moreover, Shapiro notes that the male actors involved were not willing to undergo the necessary procedures to be able to participate on women's teams. An analysis of Meta's ad library found the Daily Wire had spent $1.6 million advertising Lady Ballers on Facebook and Instagram in the previous month. The Daily Wire commentator Michael Knowles, who appears in the film as a news anchor, told the American Family Association that "left-wing reviewers" who take issue with the film's assertion that untrained men could easily dominate professional women's sports "totally missed the point of the movie, which is no one cares about women's sports."

=== Filming ===
Principal photography began in June 2023. The film was shot in Nashville, Tennessee. A casting organization advertised the movie as "a sports comedy film" with the working title Coach Miracle. Recruiter pitches included calls for people willing to dress in drag "as a visual gag." An extra told Nashville Scene that several peers objected after they learned the political nature of the film and the Daily Wire's involvement in it. They were then escorted out of the building where audience scenes were being filmed. The following day, props including a sign with the text "Baller Pride" and a transgender flag had been removed from the set. Casting recruiters eventually had to double the pay offered to extras to $300 a day. Belmont University canceled planned filming on its campus "because the production company has not fulfilled the requirements or provided the details that would have been necessary for us to proceed", according to a university statement.

=== Distribution ===
The film was announced by the Daily Wire on November 7, 2023, on their official Instagram page. The film was released on December 1, 2023, on the DailyWire+ video-on-demand site.

== Reception ==
The review aggregator Rotten Tomatoes reported that three of the seven reviews were positive.

John Serba of Decider.com was reminded of the film Juwanna Mann, and said: "Lady Ballers is funny on occasion, but only unintentionally". He concludes it "isn't offensive as much as it's just depressing" and encourages audiences to "skip it". Katelyn Burns of MSNBC argued the film was "anti-trans propaganda", and that the film was dishonest about transgender people's ability to compete in sports. Mey Rude, writing for Out magazine, described the movie as "completely unfunny, saying, "it almost seems like the people who made the movie understand that if their premise was real, there would be real-life examples of groups of men like this taking over women's sports. There aren't."

In contrast, conservative reviewer Christian Toto offered a positive review, summarizing it as "Outrageous DailyWire+ comedy skewers trans sports debate, everything woke," framing it as a broad criticism of "the country transform[ing] into a woke 'utopia,' where feelings trump facts and gender realities are kicked to the curb."

== See also ==
- List of basketball films
