= Bentkey =

American children's entertainment subscription service

- Company type: Subsidiary
- Website type: OTT streaming platform
- Available in: English
- Headquarters: Nashville, Tennessee
- Area served: North America
- Owners: DailyWire Ventures, LLC
- Industry: Entertainment
- Products: Streaming, video on demand
- Services: Children's programming
- Parent: The Daily Wire
- Website: bentkey.com
- Commercial: Yes
- Registration: Required
- Launched: October 16, 2023; 3 years ago
- Current status: Active

Bentkey is an American subscription video service for children's programming by The Daily Wire, an American media company. It was launched in October 2023, and was created for conservative parents who did not want their children to grow up with media with perceived "woke ideologies", with Disney in particular being something the service fights against. The service was originally announced in March 2022 by The Daily Wire as a children's production unit called Daily Wire Kids, or DW Kids for short. It was later spun off and rebranded into a separate subsidiary known as Bentkey.

A slate of original content was produced by a Bentkey-focused division of The Daily Wire with an initial investment of around $100 million. Its original programming includes Chip Chilla (a cartoon starring comedian Rob Schneider and later James Arnold Taylor that was described as imitative of Bluey), Gus Plus Us, Kid Explorer, Kid Fit Go!, and A Wonderful Day with Mabel Maclay. Bentkey was producing Snow White and the Evil Queen, an adaptation of Snow White originally set to star actress and then-Daily Wire employee Brett Cooper for release in 2025 to compete with Disney's live-action remake Snow White. However production was shelved after Cooper left The Daily Wire in late 2024. Storytime with Zoodles, a show that was originally in development as Doodles with Noodles and later known as The Zoodles Show, premiered on July 5, 2025.

The platform also has a substantial amount of acquired content. In early 2024, the most-watched series on the platform was the French series Runes, a tween fantasy series in a catalog dominated by preschool shows. Other noteworthy shows include the British series Clangers, the BBC-BYUtv miniseries The Canterville Ghost, and the classic animated series G.I. Joe: A Real American Hero, based on the Hasbro toy line of the same name.

== Filmography ==
=== Film ===
Year	Film	Note
Cancelled	Snow White and the Evil Queen	

=== TV series ===
Year	Film	Note
2023	Chip Chilla	
2023	A Wonderful Day with Mabel Maclay	
2023	Gus Plus Us	
2023	Kid Fit Go!	
2023	Kid Explorer	
2024	Kid Fit Chef	
2025	Storytime with Zoodles	
