= Chip Chilla =

2023 American animated television series

- Genre: Preschool; Comedy
- Created by: Eric Branscum; Ethan Nicolle
- Story by: Eric Branscum; Ethan Nicolle; Frank J. Fleming
- Voices of: Josiah Hildago; Lucy Capri; Deacon Branscum; Laura Osnes; Rob Schneider (episodes 1–12); James Arnold Taylor (episodes 13–23)
- Country of origin: United States
- Original language: English
- No. of seasons: 2
- No. of episodes: 23

Production
- Running time: 8 minutes; 15 minutes ("The Thanksgiving Holiday Special" only); 9 minutes ("The Tale of Potato Chip" only)
- Production company: Matchbox Hero

Original release
- Network: Bentkey
- Release: October 16, 2023 – June 8, 2024

Chip Chilla (originally titled Chilla Time) is an American animated television series for preschool children created by Eric Branscum and Ethan Nicolle that premiered on Bentkey, a DailyWire children's entertainment subscription service, on October 16, 2023. A second season was released on April 6, 2024.

== Synopsis ==
Chip Chilla follows Chip, a chinchilla who lives with his homeschooling family consisting of himself, his older sister, Charla, his baby brother, Chubbly, his mom, Chinny, and his dad, Chum Chum, and learning about the world around him.

== Characters ==
=== Main characters ===
- Chip Chilla (voiced by Josiah Hildago) is a homeschooled chinchilla. Although he is very friendly, cheerful, and almost always in a good mood, Chip is also selfish, arrogant, impatient and disobedient, but tries his hardest to fight his flaws and learn lessons.
- Charla Chilla (voiced by Lucy Capri) is the older sister of Chip. She is bossy, short-tempered and serious, but she is also sweet, caring, kind and cute.
- Chubbly Chilla (voiced by Deacon Branscum) is the baby brother of Chip and Charla. He is the youngest of the group and is happy, silly, funny and affectionate.
- Chinny Chilla (voiced by Laura Osnes) is the mother of Chip, Charla, and Chubbly. She is full of unconventional wisdom. Her family looks up to her and asks her for advice.
- Chum Chum Chilla (voiced by Rob Schneider from episodes 1–12, James Arnold Taylor from episodes 13–23) is the husband of Chinny and the father of Chip, Charla, and Chubbly. He is laid-back and easygoing, often telling jokes while making his family laugh.
- Bug is a dog-ladybug hybrid who always wants to take part in his owners' adventures by having fun as much as he can.

=== Supporting characters ===
- Arnie Dillo (voiced by Travis Ariza)
- Greg Guinea Pig (voiced by Rockne Moenkhoff)
- Captain Brontor (voiced by Jeremy Boreing)
- Tyrant Rex (voiced by Matt Walsh)
- Buck Rabbit (voiced by John Eric Bentley)
- Ellen Squirrel (voiced by Brett Cooper)
- Chupie Chilla (voiced by Rich Little)
- Yaya Chilla (voiced by Chonda Pierce)
- Andy Cat (voiced by Taylor Smitherman)
- Alex Bunny (voiced by Isaiah Dolan)
- Mike Mouse (voiced by Everett Good)
- Pookey Hedgehog (voiced by Elira Zorelle)

== Episodes ==
=== Season 1 (2023) ===
No. overall	No. in season	Title	Directed by	Written by	Original release date	Prod. code
1	1	"To the Moon"	Dante Tumminello	Frank J. Fleming	October 16, 2023	TBA
2	2	"Extra! Extra!"	Rod Douglas	Frank J. Fleming	October 16, 2023	TBA
3	3	"Dr. FrankenChip"	Rod Douglas	Frank J. Fleming	October 16, 2023	TBA
4	4	"Chilla Swap"	Cassidy Stone	Ethan Nicolle	October 16, 2023	TBA
5	5	"The Three Chillateers"	Cassidy Stone	Eric Branscum	October 16, 2023	TBA
6	6	"Chillympics"	Jordan Battle	Patrick Green	October 16, 2023	TBA
7	7	"Ahab Goes Bananas"	Rod Douglas & Dante Tumminello	Ethan Nicolle	October 16, 2023	TBA
8	8	"Community Garage Sale Day"	Rod Douglas	Eric Branscum	October 16, 2023	TBA
9	9	"Chip's Odyssey"	Clay Song & Jordan Battle	Ethan Nicolle	October 16, 2023	TBA
10	10	"President Charla"	Rod Douglas	Eric Branscum	October 16, 2023	TBA
11	11	"The Fall of Room"	Cassidy Stone	Frank J. Fleming	October 16, 2023	TBA
12	12	"Snow Battle"	Cassidy Stone	Frank J. Fleming	October 16, 2023	TBA
13	13	"The Thanksgiving Holiday Special"	Cassidy Stone	Eric Branscum	November 18, 2023	TBA

=== Season 2 (2024) ===
No. overall	No. in season	Title	Directed by	Written by	Original release date	Prod. code
14	1	"The Truth"	Jason Dorf	Eric Branscum	April 6, 2024	TBA
15	2	"All About the Benjamins"	Clay Song	Frank J. Fleming	April 13, 2024	TBA
16	3	"Robinson Chipcrusoe"	Cassidy Stone	Eric Branscum	April 20, 2024	TBA
17	4	"Connect the Stars"	Clay Song	Eric Branscum	April 27, 2024	TBA
18	5	"The Snow-Kay Corral"	Tamal Hanley	Ethan Nicolle	May 4, 2024	TBA
19	6	"Eggstreme Sports"	Cassidy Stone	Frank J. Fleming	May 11, 2024	TBA
20	7	"Ninja Time"	Tamal Hanley	Frank J. Fleming	May 18, 2024	TBA
21	8	"The Sheriff of Chippingham"	Jason Dorf	Ethan Nicolle	May 25, 2024	TBA
22	9	"The Cupcake Factory"	Clay Song	Patrick Green	June 1, 2024	TBA
23	10	"The Tale of Potato Chip"	Mike Kunkel	Ethan Nicolle	June 8, 2024	TBA

== Production ==
Chip Chilla was first announced in 2022 with a series of promotional material, including original character designs that looked like children shows from the 2000s, and a hand-drawn animated trailer.

== Reception ==
Chip Chilla was negatively received by journalists, seeing it as an inferior, right-wing imitation of the animated series Bluey. Janine Israel of The Guardian described the show as, in his opinion, "a bit dull," at its worst; he also remarked on how its portrayal of gender roles is more traditional than Bluey's.
