= Jeremy Boreing =

American filmmaker (born 1979)

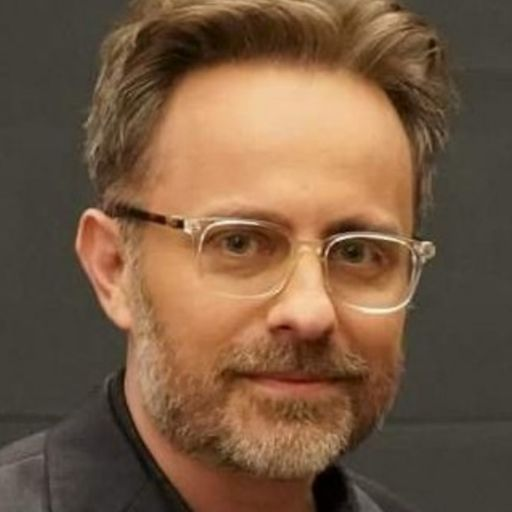
- Boreing in 2020
- Born: Jeremy Danial Boreing; February 5, 1979 (age 47); Slaton, Texas, U.S.
- Occupations: Filmmaker, podcast host, founder of Boreing Media
- Years active: 2006–present
- Known for: The Pendragon Cycle: Rise of the Merlin; The Daily Wire; Jeremy’s Razors
- Children: 1

Jeremy Danial Boreing (born February 5, 1979) is an American filmmaker, political commentator and media executive. He is the creator and showrunner of the historical fantasy series The Pendragon Cycle: Rise of the Merlin (2026), which he also co-wrote, co-directed and executive produced. He hosts the podcast The Jeremy Boreing Show, launched in March 2026, and leads Boreing Media, which acquired the Jeremy’s Razors brand from The Daily Wire in July 2026.

In 2015, Boreing co-founded the conservative news and opinion website The Daily Wire with Ben Shapiro and served as its co-CEO until 2025. During his tenure the company sued the Biden administration over the OSHA COVID-19 vaccine mandate, launched consumer brands including Jeremy’s Razors, and expanded into film and television production. In 2024 he fired Candace Owens from the company over remarks deemed antisemitic. Earlier in his career he produced and co-wrote the 2007 thriller Spiral.

== Career ==
=== 2002–2006: Early career ===
Born in Slaton, Texas, Boreing started his career at a local regional theatre, the Garza, as a writer and producer. In 2002, he met future writing partner Joel David Moore, a friend of a friend. He moved to Los Angeles in the mid-2000s to work as a film producer and screenwriter. His first job in Hollywood was with Zachary Levi and Eric McCormack, for a television pilot with Big Cattle Productions.

In June 2006, Boreing joined Kurt Schemper, Joel David Moore, and Zachary Levi to form Coattails Entertainment, a film production company. He produced and co-wrote the company's first feature film, Spiral, with Moore who also directed alongside Adam Green. That same year, he produced the comedy film Etienne!.

=== 2013–2025: The Daily Wire ===
In 2013, Boreing and Ben Shapiro founded the now-defunct conservative website TruthRevolt, which criticized U.S. media and was funded by the David Horowitz Freedom Center.

In 2015, Boreing and Shapiro founded The Daily Wire and began producing the first few episodes of The Ben Shapiro Show podcast from Boreing's pool house. Boreing, who served as co-CEO, was jokingly referred to as the "god-king" of The Daily Wire by some staff and fans, always emphasizing "lower case 'g'". Boreing has been a contributor behind the scenes for PragerU, which produces conservative internet videos. According to PragerU co-founder Allen Estrin, Boreing "came up with the site's signature visual style after a photographer came after them with a fair-use claim; their solution was to use illustrations instead." Boreing served as Executive Director of Friends of Abe, a low-profile networking organization for Hollywood conservatives founded by Gary Sinise. During his tenure as executive director, Boreing refused to give the Internal Revenue Service access to the section of the organization's website that would identify its members, saying such access was not required by federal law.

In November 2021, The Daily Wire, the company for which Boreing served as the chief executive officer, filed a lawsuit challenging the President Joe Biden OSHA vaccine mandate in federal court, on appeal in the United States Court of Appeals for the Sixth Circuit. The Daily Wire was successful, as the Supreme Court in January 2022 blocked the Biden administration policy in a 6-3 ruling. Boreing has capitalized on the backlash against businesses perceived as "woke" by launching conservative alternatives. After Harry's razors pulled its Daily Wire advertisements due to what they saw as "hate speech" in 2021, Boreing launched an "I Hate Harry's" campaign and released his own subscription brand of razors, Jeremy's Razors. As a protest against Hershey's inclusion of a transgender woman in an advertisement for its limited edition "HER for SHE" chocolate bars in honor of International Women's Day, Boreing launched Jeremy's Chocolates in May 2023.

In March 2024, Boreing fired Candace Owens from The Daily Wire after Owens made multiple remarks that were deemed antisemitic. In the aftermath of Owens' departure, Boreing participated in an online BlazeTV audio show with Nick Fuentes, who defended Owens' use of the phrase "Christ is King"; Boreing noted that for a Christian to make such a proclamation to declare their faith is fine, but Owens uses it exclusively as a way to spread hatred and strife, usually in tandem with anti-Semitic proclamations. Boreing, who has used strong language to condemn Fuentes, told him that he was "one of the most talented people out there", which only makes Fuentes a bigger threat than he would otherwise be.

In March 2025, it was reported Boreing would step down as co-CEO of The Daily Wire to focus on producing creative content for the company. According to a 2026 interview, he negotiated an end to his partnership at The Daily Wire because of a shift in priorities, and his desire to focus on film and TV projects.

=== 2026–present: The Pendragon Cycle, The Jeremy Boreing Show and Boreing Media ===
In 2022, The Daily Wire announced an adaptation of Stephen R. Lawhead’s novel series The Pendragon Cycle, and in July 2023 Boreing took a leave of absence as co-CEO to co-direct it. Boreing created the series and served as its showrunner; he wrote or co-wrote four of its seven episodes, directed the first two, and executive produced the season. He also wrote the song “The Lament of Pwyll” and co-wrote “Math ap Mathonwy” with the series’ composer, Kyle McCuiston. Filmed in Italy and Hungary, The Pendragon Cycle: Rise of the Merlin premiered on DailyWire+ on January 22, 2026, and was released on Prime Video in Europe in July 2026 and in the United States on September 1, 2026. After debuting at No. 4 overall in the UK, it became the No. 1 fantasy series on Prime Video there, and it reached the top of Prime Video’s fantasy rankings in Canada, Ireland, Spain and Poland. In the United States it peaked at No. 2 among TV shows on Prime Video, and remained in the platform’s top five weeks after release. Screen Rant, MovieWeb and CBR described it as a major streaming hit. The series received largely positive reviews, with The Telegraph calling it “brilliant”, though Esquire panned it.

In 2026, Deadline reported that Boreing would launch his own independent podcast, titled The Jeremy Boreing Show. The show premiered on all major podcast platforms on March 24, 2026.

In July 2026, The Daily Wire sold Jeremy’s Razors and Jeremy’s Chocolates to Boreing Media, a company founded by Boreing, who returned as the razor brand’s owner and CEO. According to The Daily Wire, the brand had generated $55 million in sales and at one point accounted for 10% of the company’s annual revenue.

== Personal life ==
In July 2020, Boreing and his wife adopted a girl. Boreing is an evangelical Christian. He is also blind in one eye and lacks any depth perception.

== Filmography ==
=== Feature films ===
Year	Film	Director	Writer	Producer	Actor
2007	Spiral	No	Yes	Yes	No
2014	The Arroyo	Yes	Yes	Yes	No
2023	Lady Ballers	Yes	Yes	Yes	Yes

Producer only

- Etienne! (2009)
- Terror on the Prairie (2022)

Executive producer only

- Shadowheart (2014)
- Shut In (2022)

Acting roles

Year	Film	Role	Notes
2007	Spiral	Concerned employee	Uncredited
2023	Chip Chilla	Captain Brontor (voice)	2 episodes
2023	Lady Ballers	Coach Rob	Main role

=== Short films ===
Writer

- Byron Phillips: Found (2009)

=== Television ===
Executive producer

Year	TV Series	Notes
2019–2023	What We Saw	
2021	Debunked	
2021	The Search	
2022	China: The Enemy Within	
2022	Fauci Unmasked	
2022	Adam Carolla: Truth Yeller	
2022	That's Not Funny	
2022	Dragons Monsters & Men	
2023	Vision and Destiny	
2023	Exodus	
2023	Gus Plus Us	
2023	Convicting a Murderer	
2023	Chip Chilla	
2023	A Wonderful Day with Mabel Maclay	
2026	The Pendragon Cycle: Rise of the Merlin	Also co-director with: Jesse V. Johnson; Ryan Whitaker

=== Documentaries ===
Executive producer

- What Is a Woman? (2022)
- The Greatest Lie Ever Sold (2022)
- Logos and Literacy (2022)
- Am I Racist? (2024)
