= What Is a Woman? =

2022 American documentary film by Justin Folk

- The Daily Wire release poster
- Directed by: Justin Folk
- Produced by: Justin Folk; Dallas Sonnier; Charlotte Roland
- Starring: Matt Walsh; Scott Newgent; Gert Comfrey; Marci Bowers; Don Sucher; Michelle Forcier; Patrick Grzanka; Miriam Grossman; Rodrigo Lehtinen; Jordan Peterson; Naia Ōkami; Carl Trueman; Debra Soh
- Narrated by: Matt Walsh
- Cinematography: Anton Seim
- Edited by: Jarrod Leesland
- Music by: Scott McCrae; Ryan Rapsys
- Distributed by: The Daily Wire
- Release date: June 1, 2022
- Running time: 95 minutes
- Country: United States
- Language: English

What Is a Woman? is a 2022 American documentary film about gender and transgender issues, directed by Justin Folk and presented by conservative political commentator Matt Walsh. It was released and distributed by conservative website The Daily Wire. In it, Walsh asks various people "what is a woman?" with the goal of showing them that their definition of womanhood is circular. Walsh said he made it in opposition to what he calls gender ideology. According to transgender activists and others who appeared in it, Walsh had invited individuals to participate under false pretenses. It was released to subscribers of The Daily Wire on June 1, 2022, coinciding with the start of Pride Month.

What Is a Woman? received mixed reviews from critics, with Walsh's approach garnering praise from conservative commentators, while drawing criticism from other sources, including advocates of transgender healthcare. It is described in many sources as anti-trans, or transphobic, with some calling it a propaganda film. Fact checkers have shown that some of the claims in it are false. Walsh's tour to showcase What Is a Woman? at college campuses sparked protests. In June 2023, during the subsequent Pride Month, it gained further attention when Elon Musk promoted it on Twitter.

== Synopsis ==
What Is a Woman? features Matt Walsh asking "what is a woman?" and related questions to a variety of people, with the goal of convincing them that their definition of womanhood is circular. It discusses topics such as puberty blockers, transgender youth, and transgender athletes in women's sports. Interviewees include a gender-affirming therapist, a pediatrician, a gender studies professor, a psychiatrist, a transgender man who had a negative transition experience, a surgeon specializing in gender-affirming surgery, a transgender person opposing medical transition for children, and a father of a 14-year-old transgender boy. The film also interviews American politician Mark Takano, and Canadian author and psychologist Jordan Peterson. Walsh also discusses non-binary and transgender concepts with a tribe in Kenya, and features a gay man practicing public nudity in San Francisco. Walsh also attends a women’s rights march to ask the question.

In the middle of the film, What Is a Woman? delves into some of the history of gender identity, discussing sexologist Alfred Kinsey and psychologist John Money, with the latter being known for performing sex reassignment on a Canadian infant, David Reimer. After a botched circumcision, Reimer was then raised as a girl without having knowledge of the procedure and transitioned back to living as male. The film also shows news stories treated as representative of nationwide trends such as the Wi Spa controversy, and a school bathroom assault at Loudoun County, Virginia.

The final quarter of the film shows Walsh saying "I'm done asking questions," before the film changes from an investigation into a call to action. One of his actions is his appearance on The Dr. Phil Show, in where he states his mission "I care about the truth, so basic truth matters, I want to live in a society where people care about the truth, I care about children". In the conclusion segment, it shows Walsh's speech during a Loudoun County School Board meeting in Virginia. The meeting was called to provide a platform for people to express their views about Policy 8040, which instructs staff members to use the preferred name and pronouns of transgender students and allows the students to access school facilities that correspond to their gender identity. In his speech, Walsh says to the board, "You are all child abusers. You prey upon impressionable children and indoctrinate them into your insane ideological cult, a cult which holds many fanatical views but none so deranged as the idea that boys are girls and girls are boys."

At the end, Walsh asks Jordan Peterson what is a woman. Peterson responds with "Marry one and find out." Walsh follows his advice and goes home, where he finds his wife in the kitchen making sandwiches. She answers the question of "what is a woman?" – "an adult human female," she then asks Walsh to help her open a jar of pickles.

== Production ==
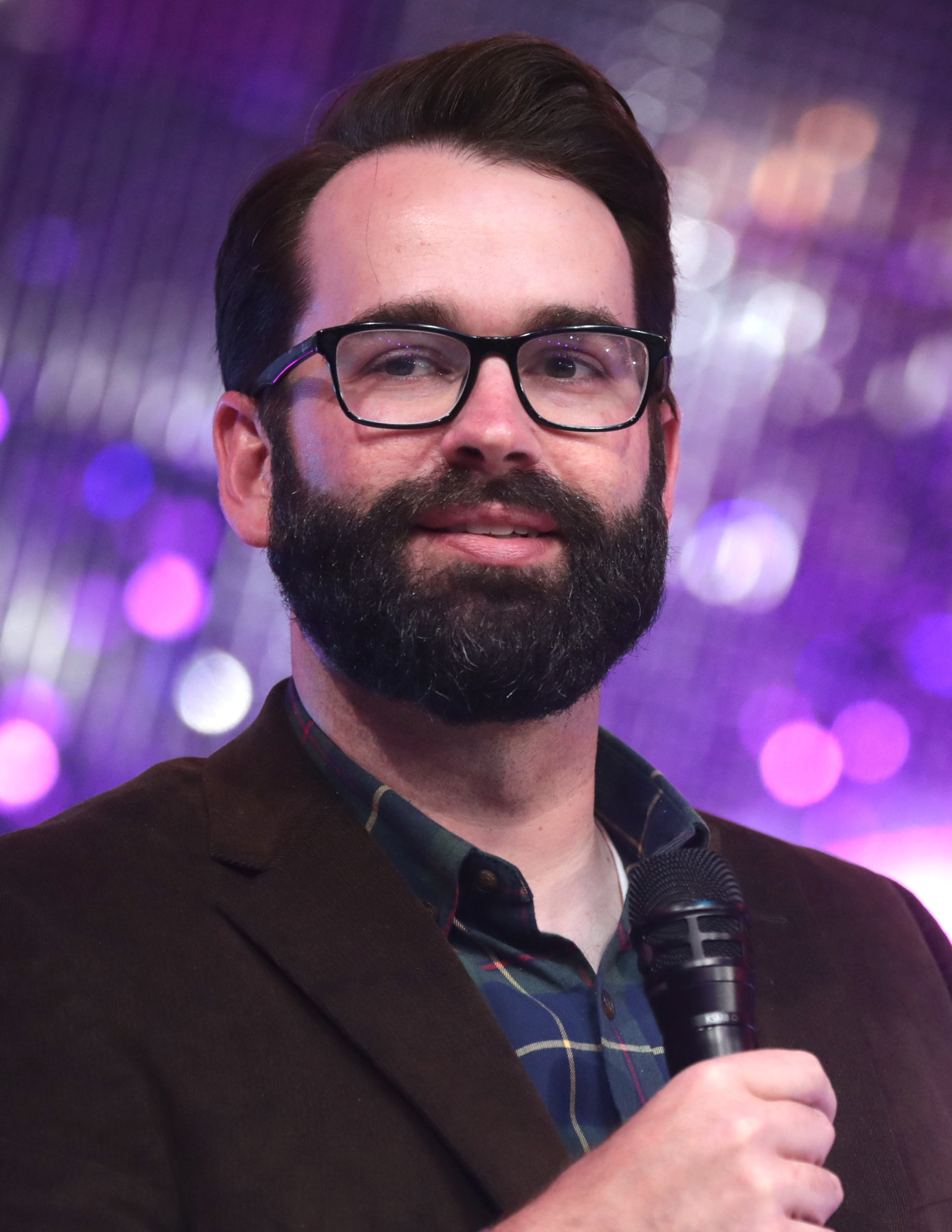
Matt Walsh, the main presenter of What Is a Woman?

What Is a Woman? was directed by Justin Folk, and produced by The Daily Wire. The main presenter, Matt Walsh, said it was made because he thought that its titular question had not been adequately answered after a tweet he had made four years prior. On the podcast The Joe Rogan Experience, he stated that he noticed the transgender topic gaining mainstream attention in 2017 due to figures like Caitlyn Jenner, which he says caused him to come up with the question. Walsh also wanted the film to be "a piece of entertainment" since other conservative documentaries felt like "you're watching extended version of a podcast". He also didn't wanted to repeat "what people already know, which is that two sides yell at each other." Walsh also said he made it in opposition to what he calls gender ideology, to the point of calling it "a cult".

In February 2022, transgender activist Eli Erlick alleged that Walsh had invited trans people to participate in What Is a Woman? under false pretenses. Kataluna Enriquez, Fallon Fox, and several other transgender public figures corroborated the account. Walsh had formed a group called the "Gender Unity Project," which the activists asserted was an attempt to lure them into participating. Following the emergence of these allegations, the Twitter account associated with the Gender Unity Project was suspended. According to Erlick, there were at least fifty other individuals recruited for interviews, including a 14-year-old transgender girl.

== Release ==
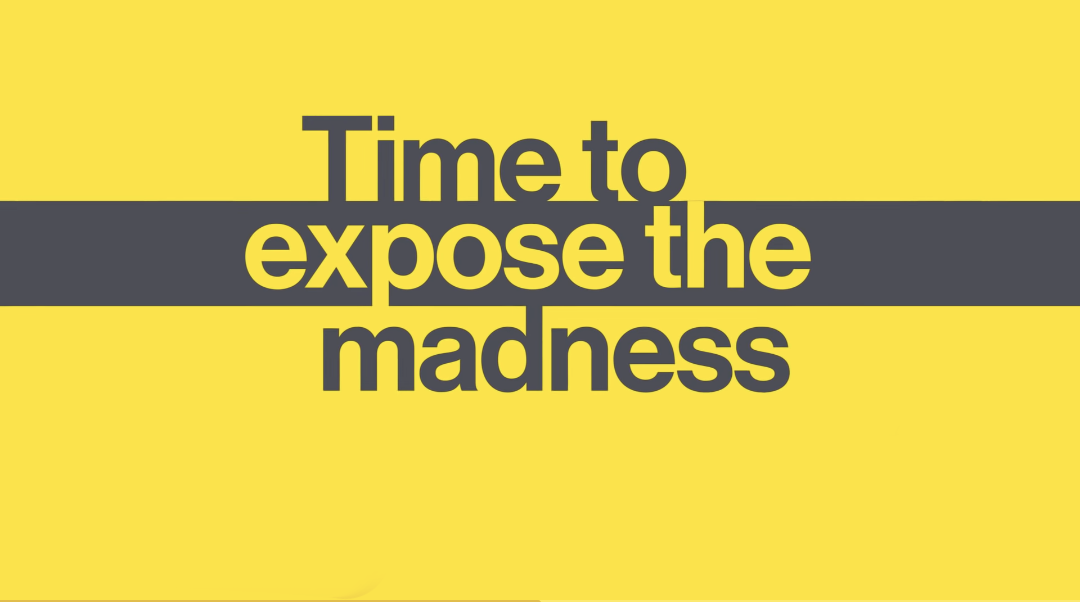
A YouTube advertisement for What Is a Woman?

What Is a Woman? was released to subscribers of The Daily Wire website on June 1, 2022, to coincide with the beginning of Pride Month. The Daily Wire reported that they were hit with a distributed denial of service (DDoS) attack during the premiere. An article by The Daily Dot cast doubt on the DDoS claim, noting previous technical problems with the website. On June 10, Rolling Stone estimated The Daily Wire spent $500,000 for advertisements for What Is a Woman? on social media platforms like TikTok and Facebook to promote the documentary, with the ads appearing shortly after its release.

In May 2022, according to The Daily Dot, a transgender man alleged that Walsh used photos of his top surgery results from his Instagram account in What Is a Woman? without his permission. Twitter refused a request to take down a trailer containing the image. In September 2022, The Daily Dot reported that Eventbrite, an event management website, was refusing the use of its platform for showcasing What Is a Woman?, citing violations of its community guidelines, including the prohibition of hateful content regarding sexual orientation and gender identity. On September 7, Walsh claimed that the website had been refusing screenings since July, describing the categorization of it as 'hate speech' as absurd and indefensible. Some supporters of Walsh accused Eventbrite of censorship. Walsh also accused Eventbrite of being anti-conservative and hypocritical, pointing out that the website "will happily provide a platform" to drag shows. Walsh screened it on his What Is a Woman? college tour at the University of Houston on October 13, 2022. Police estimated that 435 people attended to watch the film, with 400 protesters (including transgender rights activists) and counter-protesters outside. A screening by Walsh at the University of Wisconsin also was met by protesters.

Avatar of Elon Musk

Elon Musk
Twitter
@elonmusk

Every parent should watch this

Jun 2, 2023

Avatar of Daily Wire

Daily Wire
Twitter
@realDailyWire

It’s the movie they really don’t want you to see: #WhatIsAWoman?

Watch the explosive documentary starring @MattWalshBlog FREE on Twitter for 24 hrs.

Jun 2, 2023

On June 1, 2023, the start of Pride Month, The Daily Wire CEO Jeremy Boreing complained that Twitter had canceled a plan to promote the video, reportedly because of misgendering, and said that the video was being suppressed. Twitter CEO Elon Musk initially agreed to lift only some restrictions, but after being pressured removed all restrictions and personally recommended the video, tweeting on June 2, "Every parent should watch this." Chiefs of Twitter's trust and safety division, Ella Irwin and A.J. Brown, left the company on the same day. Walsh called Musk's promotion a "huge win". In July 2023, NBC News reported that three people who starred said that its producers misrepresented how What Is a Woman? would portray transgender topics and that they were inserted into "gotcha" moments.

== Reception ==
What Is a Woman? had a divided reception from critics, with Walsh's approach garnering praise from conservative commentators, while drawing criticism from other sources. It has been described in journalistic and academic sources as anti-trans, or transphobic. Some writers, including those in LGBTQ publications, have described it as propaganda. On the review aggregator website Rotten Tomatoes, 75% of 8 critics' reviews are positive.

Many writers described Walsh's perspective on the transgender community as fantastically inaccurate, monstrous or dangerous, inflaming the prejudices of those already against the existence and rights of transgender individuals. Transgender activist Eli Erlick told Rolling Stone that "to believe what's in [the documentary] requires a fantastical hatred of trans people" and that it shows an "appalling lack of research on the trans community". Malcolm Harris of Intelligencer describes the last quarter as "an incitement to violence." Tamma Moksha of The Hindu said that the editorial choices are "jarring". AJ Eckert of Science-Based Medicine compared it to other pseudoscience propaganda films such as Vaxxed (2016) and Expelled! (2008). Fact checkers have shown that some of the claims in What Is a Woman? are false. NBC News and Reuters notes that the film has spread myths about sexuality and gender, including the debunked litter boxes in schools hoax. Moksha claims that What Is a Woman? attributing the term "gender identity" to John Money is "inaccurate".

Eckert and Moksha both criticize the premise, saying Walsh's journey was "not genuine curiosity," and that he didn't want to "honestly seek answers to a perplexing question". Some of those open to Walsh's perspective, such as Zoran Janković of the Serbian magazine Vreme, nevertheless said it had a "propagandistic nature". Adam Zivo of the Canadian newspaper The National Post, who agreed there was "absurdity" in the rhetoric of some LGBTQ activists, said it used "bad-faith storytelling to rile up audiences while oversimplifying complex issues", most present in the focus on "'gotcha' moments". Jennifer Graham of Deseret News said that due to Walsh claiming to be a "best-selling children’s book author" and "women’s studies scholar", Graham said that he "may be trolling all of us with the film", while also seeing the potential that Walsh could be using the "What Is a Woman?" question as part of the culture war.

Avatar of J.K. Rowling

J.K. Rowling
Twitter
@jk_rowling

And your film did a good job exposing the incoherence of gender identity theory and some of the harms it's done. Many institutions I used to admire have uncritically embraced this dogma, but I reserve my ire for them rather than shouting 'coward' at individual women.

Jul 10, 2022

Avatar of Matt Walsh

Matt Walsh
Twitter
@MattWalshBlog

I respect the courage you've shown on this issue, @jk_rowling. But many people have simply caved to the demands of trans activists and completely surrendered truth and reality to them. The cowards are also villains in this story. They need to be held accountable.

Jul 10, 2022

What Is a Woman? was praised by many conservative commentators. American politician Matt Schaefer promoted the film on Twitter. British author J. K. Rowling wrote positively of What Is a Woman? in a tweet, saying that it exposed the "incoherence of gender identity". Transgender conservative commentator and YouTuber Blaire White also praised the film. Rich Lowry of National Review called it "mesmerizing and extremely disturbing." Amy Welborn of The Catholic World Report wrote "well-produced, amusing, and frustrating", and Gaby Gaduh of Movieguide "lively, provocative, informative, and brilliant". A few journalists provided comparisons to Walsh's approach, such as Leor Sapir of City Journal, citing other books and movies that spark "a demand for social reform" such as Ralph Nader's 1965 book Unsafe at Any Speed. Kai Burkhardt of Die Welt compared it to the works of Michael Moore, with Burkhardt and Dimitrije Vojnov of Radio Television of Serbia writing that it established Walsh as the conservative Michael Moore, although Vojnov presented it as a critique of Walsh's bias.

What Is a Woman?'s only frequent major criticism from those in favor of Walsh's point of view was not doing enough with its goals, such as its exploration of the topic and not drilling down his most compelling questions. Both Debbie Hayton and Jo Bartosch wrote that it would have benefited from interviewing gender-critical feminist critics, such as American professor Janice Raymond, English writer Julie Bindel, Irish journalist Helen Joyce, British philosopher Kathleen Stock, American journalist Abigail Shrier and American attorney Kara Dansky. A couple of Christian reviews also questioned What Is a Woman?'s balance. Mathew De Sousa of The Catholic Weekly said it "provides a fair scope of both leftist and conservative beliefs on core gender issues", but criticized the lack of Christian resources, and said that the film could have shown more arguments against what he calls "gender ideology" and the "transgender agenda". Brett McCracken of The Gospel Coalition said that if the film had more empathy, it would have "strengthened Walsh's case", criticizing his "name-calling" of transgender people as "not a great tactic in persuasion, nor in evangelism."

== See also ==
- Transgender rights in the United States
- Anti-gender movement
- Johnny the Walrus, a 2022 children's book written by Walsh which allegorically compares being transgender to pretending to be a walrus.
- When Harry Became Sally: Responding to the Transgender Moment, a 2018 book critical of the modern transgender movement by socially conservative philosopher Ryan T. Anderson.
