= The Daily Wire =

American conservative website and media company

- Website type: News, opinion, and media
- Headquarters: Nashville, Tennessee, U.S.
- Owners: DailyWire Ventures, LLC
- Creators: Ben Shapiro; Jeremy Boreing
- Key people: Ben Shapiro (editor emeritus) Mike Richards (CEO) John Bickley (editor-in-chief)
- Employees: ~200
- Subsidiaries: Bentkey
- Website: dailywire.com
- Launched: September 21, 2015; 11 years ago
- Current status: Active

The Daily Wire is an American right-wing media company founded in 2015 by political commentator Ben Shapiro, film director Jeremy Boreing, and Caleb Robinson. The company is a publisher on Facebook, produces podcasts such as The Ben Shapiro Show, and has also produced various films and video series. Its DailyWire+ video on demand platform was launched in 2022, and its children's video platform Bentkey in 2023. The Daily Wire is based in Nashville, Tennessee.

While The Daily Wire has an editorial team, many of its stories repackage journalism from traditional news organizations while adding a conservative slant. It primarily covers political and cultural issues. Fact checkers have said that some stories shared by the Daily Wire are unverified, and that the Daily Wire sometimes misstates facts to advance a partisan view. It has published climate change denial, and academics have described its coverage of COVID-19 as "junk health news". Multiple scientific studies have described it as a fake news website.

== History ==
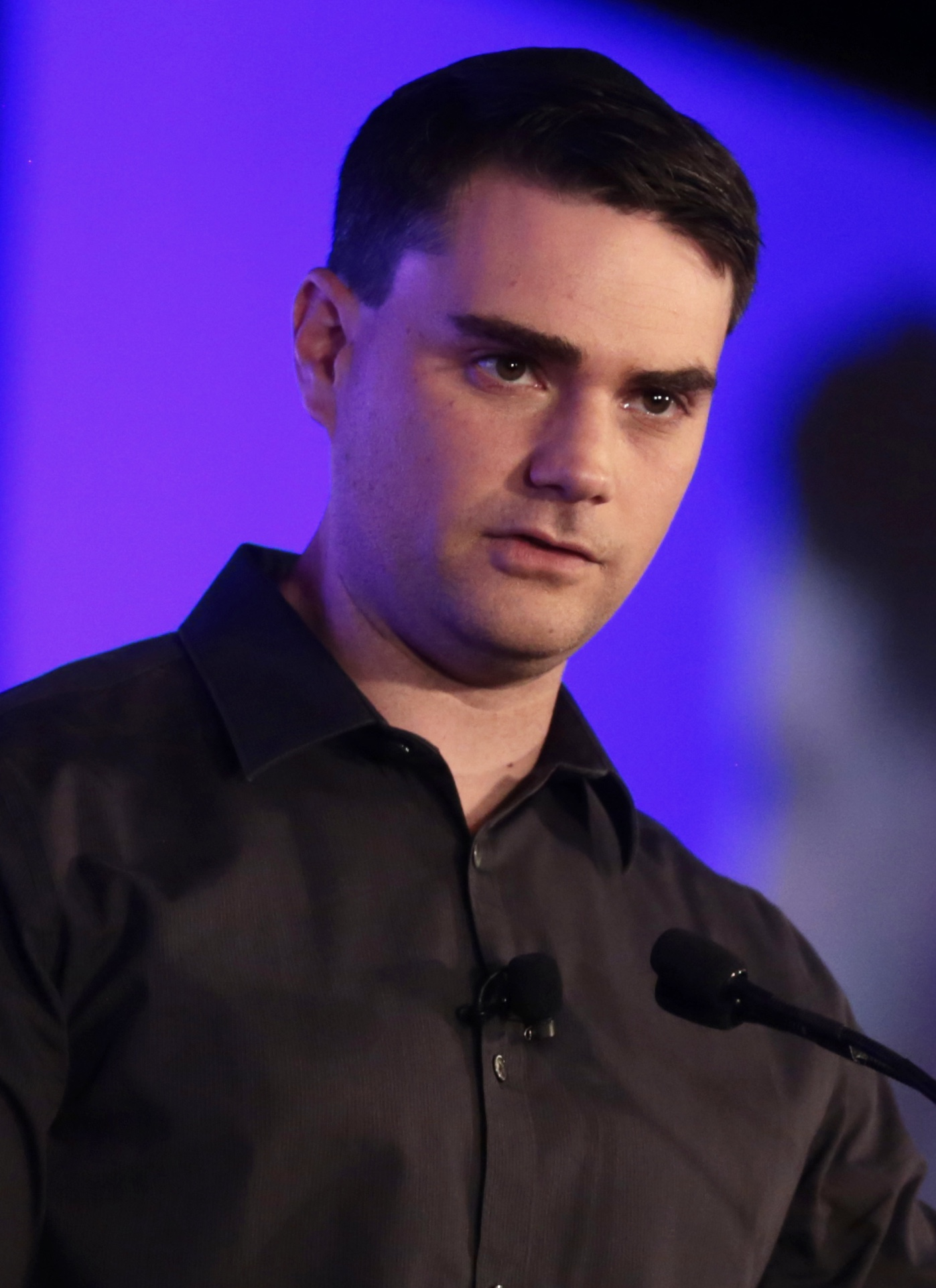
Ben Shapiro, co-founder of The Daily Wire

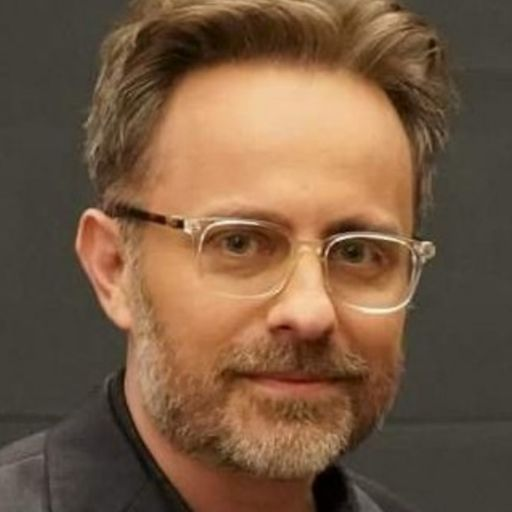
Jeremy Boreing, co-founder of The Daily Wire

The Daily Wire was conceived by Ben Shapiro and Jeremy Boreing, who both worked for TruthRevolt, a news website that was formerly funded by the David Horowitz Freedom Center. After the duo secured several million dollars in seed funding from billionaire petroleum industry brothers Dan and Farris Wilks, the Daily Wire was launched in 2015 with Caleb Robinson as founding CEO. Farris manages DailyWire Ventures, LLC (formerly Forward Publishing, LLC, and later Bentkey Ventures, LLC), which publishes the Daily Wire. Initially, the company was headquartered in Los Angeles, California and supported mostly by advertisements. In September 2020, Shapiro announced that the Daily Wire headquarters would move to Nashville, Tennessee.

The Daily Wire became one of the leading news sites and publishers on Facebook in terms of engagement. In 2018, NewsWhip identified the Daily Wire as "by far" the top right-wing publisher on Facebook. According to NewsWhip, the Daily Wire was the sixth-leading English-language publisher on Facebook in 2019 through the month of March. The site also had the second most articles among Facebook's 10,000 top stories. In 2021, stories published by the Daily Wire received more likes, shares and comments on Facebook than any other news publisher, according to NPR.

In April 2019, Podtrac ranked the Daily Wire's The Ben Shapiro Show the second most listened-to podcast in the U.S. for the month of March 2019, behind The Daily.

In October 2019, the investigative website Popular Information said that the Daily Wire had violated Facebook's policies by creating 14 anonymous pages promoting its content exclusively to boost engagement. In response, Facebook temporarily demoted a network called Mad World News, which had a financial relationship with the Daily Wire, but issued no penalty to the Daily Wire besides a warning.

In June 2020, Shapiro stepped down from his role as editor-in-chief, which he had held since the site's founding, and took on the role of editor emeritus. John Bickley was announced as the site's next editor-in-chief.

In January 2021, Shapiro announced that the Daily Wire was beginning a studio for TV and films that would not promote leftist causes. Its first original movie, Shut In, premiered in 2022.

In September 2021, Shapiro and Boreing announced that the Daily Wire would defy U.S. President Joe Biden's COVID-19 vaccine mandate for companies with more than 100 employees. The company later filed a lawsuit, and the issue was eventually brought before the Supreme Court. The Supreme Court declared the mandates unlawful with a 6–3 ruling.

In 2021, the Daily Wire announced a new publishing imprint, DW Books, that would release books by Shapiro, Candace Owens, Gina Carano, and an officer who fired shots in the police killing of Breonna Taylor, among others. According to AP News, this "continues a trend of conservatives setting up channels outside of the New York [publishing] houses", after publishing houses canceled several books seen as promoting extremist views, or refused distribution when other imprints picked them up. DW Books planned to release books through Ingram Content Group starting in 2022.

The Daily Wire's annual revenues exceeded $100 million for the first time as of early 2022, and it had 150 employees. In March 2022, the Daily Wire announced plans to invest at least $100 million into children's entertainment content over a three-year period in response to Disney's opposition to Florida's House Bill 1557. In June 2022, the Daily Wire launched DailyWire+, a video on demand platform featuring various Daily Wire content, including podcasts and video productions. In June 2022, co-founder Jeremy Boreing said the Daily Wire had 890,000 paid subscribers. In November 2022, Boreing stated that they had surpassed 1 million subscribers.

In January 2023, conservative commentator Steven Crowder revealed on his YouTube channel that he had received a term sheet from an unnamed conservative media company (later revealed to be the Daily Wire) that included a provision that, if he were to be demonetized or removed from platforms such as YouTube, Facebook or the iTunes Store, his salary would be cut substantially during that period. Crowder took immense issue with that provision, saying that it enforces policies that disproportionately target conservatives and claiming "Big Tech is in bed with Big Con." Co-founder Jeremy Boreing later responded to Crowder's video, claiming that Crowder had misrepresented the terms of the contract and that the contract would have paid Crowder $50 million over four years. Furthermore, Boreing asserted that the stipulation was necessary to ensure profitability. Other Daily Wire pundits such as Ben Shapiro, Matt Walsh and Candace Owens also criticized Crowder for his actions, including secretly recording a phone call he had with Boreing and only releasing parts of the call selectively, including a quote from Boreing saying that up-and-coming conservative commentators need to be "wage slaves for a little bit" while they build their brand.

In March 2025, it was reported Jeremy Boreing would step down as co-CEO, with Caleb Robinson remaining as sole CEO.

In May 2025, it was announced that Mike Richards would join The Daily Wire as president and chief content officer.

On May 15, 2026, Shapiro announced that the company had laid off 13% of its staff, mostly in the Nashville area. On May 20, Robinson resigned as CEO and was replaced by Richards.

In June 2026, Semafor reported that The Daily Wire was in talks to secure at least $100 million in investment with plans for an initial public offering (IPO). The company held talks with Highmount Capital to lead a funding round that would value the company at $750 million. The Daily Wire's bankers said a $2 billion IPO could be achievable “within approximately 18 months.”

== Podcasts and radio ==
In addition to its written content, the site produces several podcasts, including: The Ben Shapiro Show, The Michael Knowles Show, The Matt Walsh Show, and The Andrew Klavan Show.

The reach of The Ben Shapiro Show expanded in April 2018 when Westwood One began syndicating the podcast to radio. In January 2019, Westwood One expanded Shapiro's one-hour podcast-to-radio program, adding a nationally syndicated two-hour live radio show, for three hours of Ben Shapiro programming daily. As of March 2019, according to Westwood One, The Ben Shapiro Show is being carried by more than 200 stations, including in nine of the top ten markets.

In 2020, the Daily Wire acquired the entirety of PragerU's content. That same year, activist and former Turning Point USA communications director Candace Owens announced that she would move to Nashville, Tennessee, and join the Daily Wire with her own show, Candace. During the 2023 Gaza war, the organization faced significant infighting between Ben Shapiro and Candace Owens on the Israeli-Palestinian conflict, with Shapiro generally supporting Israel's actions during the war and U.S. support for Israel, while Owens has criticized Israel's actions and U.S. support for Israel. The dispute was later cited as a factor for Owens leaving the company in March 2024, and beginning a new YouTube channel that she runs independently.

In October 2021, the Daily Wire hired American sportscaster Allison Williams, who had resigned from ESPN because the company mandated its live-event staffers to get the vaccine, and Williams had decided against getting the vaccine while trying to conceive another child. The Daily Wire advertised the hire as "sports without the woke", with a banner that said "did not comply". Williams said she would explore issues "that may be too taboo for other media outlets." In 2022, Williams hosted a show called BreakAways. She returned to sideline reporting with Fox Sports in August 2022, although a few episodes of BreakAways were released in 2025. In February 2022, the Daily Wire started a sports show called Crain & Company, hosted by Jake Crain, Blain Crain, and David Cone. (David Cone is a former quarterback for the University of Michigan.) In 2026, Crain & Company moved to On3.com.

In March 2022, the Daily Wire started a YouTube channel called The Comments Section with Brett Cooper. Following Cooper's departure from the company in December 2024, the show's producer, Reagan Conrad, who began filling in for Cooper when she was unavailable, took over as The Comments Section's new host.

In 2022, DailyWire+ started airing The Jordan B. Peterson Podcast.

In January 2026, Matt Fradd and his Catholic podcast Pints With Aquinas joined The Daily Wire.

=== Current personalities ===
- Ben Shapiro (co-founder)
- John Bickley and Georgia Howe (hosts of Morning Wire)
- Isabel Brown
- Reagan Conrad (host of The Comments Section)
- Matt Fradd (host of Pints With Aquinas)
- Andrew Klavan
- Michael Knowles
- Mat Nuclear (host of The Nuclear Reaction)
- Jordan Peterson
- Cabot Phillips (host of Wired In Live)
- Matt Walsh
- Clay Travis

=== Former personalities ===
- Jeremy Boreing (co-founder, 2015−2025)
- Allison Williams (host of BreakAways, 2022)
- Brett Cooper (2022−2024)
- Jake Crain, Blain Crain, and David Cone (hosts of Crain & Company, 2022−2025)
- Candace Owens (2021−2024)

== Documentaries ==
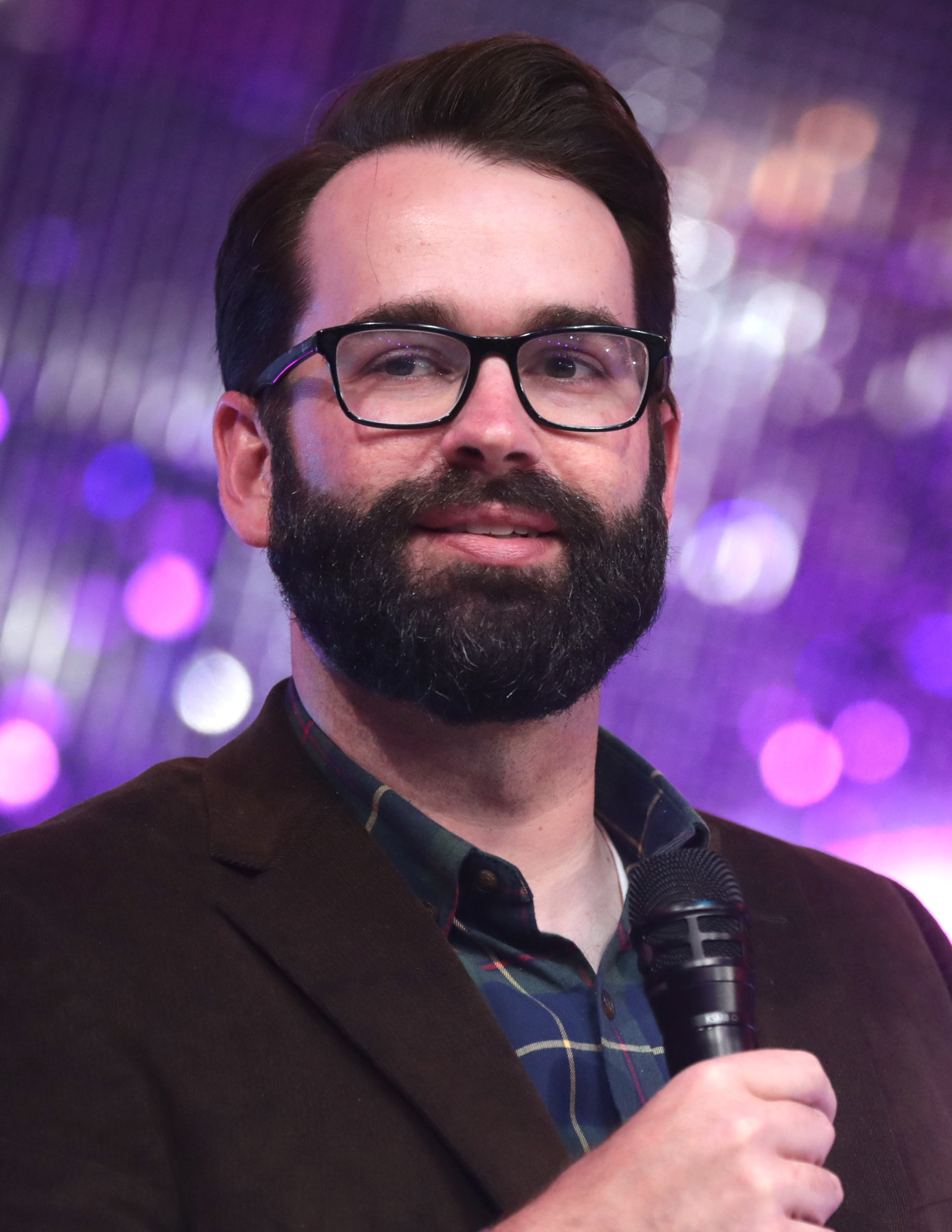
The Daily Wire's best known documentaries are Matt Walsh's What Is a Woman? and Am I Racist?, both directed by Justin Folk

The Daily Wire has created several documentaries, including the Matt Walsh documentaries What Is a Woman? released on June 1, 2022, and Am I Racist? released on September 13, 2024. Convicting a Murderer is a 2023 American true-crime documentary series narrated and hosted by Candace Owens for the Daily Wire. Two other documentaries are the Candace Owens helm project The Greatest Lie Ever Sold and the Dr. Jordan Peterson project Logos and Literacy.

== Entertainment ==
Daily Wire personalities Michael Knowles and Jeremy Boreing have performed some songs together, as a band with the name Smokey Mike & The god-king.

In January 2021, the Daily Wire released Run Hide Fight, a feature-length drama about a mass school shooting. Its North American release was exclusive to Daily Wire subscribers. In November, the Daily Wire launched Adam Carolla Truth Yeller, a comedy podcast filmed with a live audience, featuring comedian Adam Carolla.

On February 10, 2022, the Daily Wire's first original film, Shut In, premiered on YouTube. It was directed by D.J. Caruso and starred Rainey Qualley, Josh Horowitz, and Vincent Gallo in his first film since 2013. After acquiring domestic rights to The Hyperions, a superhero comedy starring Cary Elwes, the company premiered the film for free on YouTube on March 10, 2022. Afterward, it moved to the Daily Wire site for exclusive domestic on-demand viewing.

Terror on the Prairie, a western set in Montana and starring Gina Carano, was released to subscribers on June 14, 2022.

On June 29, 2022, the Daily Wire launched the video on demand platform DailyWire+ featuring various Daily Wire podcasts and video productions, and announced an animated preschool series titled Chip Chilla, which featured the voice of comedian Rob Schneider. On November 3, My Dinner with Trump, a cinéma vérité-style documentary featuring Donald Trump with 16 of his closest advisors, released exclusively on the platform.

In November 2022, the Daily Wire announced that it will produce adaptations of Ayn Rand's 1957 novel Atlas Shrugged and Stephen R. Lawhead's series The Pendragon Cycle. The Pendragon Cycle: Rise of the Merlin began filming in September 2023, and is planned for release in 2026. The seven-episode series will be co-directed by Jeremy Boreing and will star Tom Sharp and the conservative YouTuber Brett Cooper. On October 16, 2023—the centennial anniversary of Walt Disney founding his company Boreing announced a kids' content service called Bentkey, which launched that day. The service features some of the kids' content they had announced the prior year, including Chip Chilla. Bentkey's first feature-length film was announced to be a live-action adaptation of Snow White, titled Snow White and the Evil Queen, starring Cooper as the titular character, in response to the 2025 Disney Snow White film.

=== Films ===
Title	Genre	U.S. release date	Platform	Notes
Run Hide Fight	Action thriller	January 14, 2021	DailyWire+	
Shut In	Thriller	February 10, 2022	DailyWire+	
The Hyperions	Superhero comedy	March 10, 2022	Tubi	
What Is a Woman?	Documentary	June 1, 2022	DailyWire+	
Terror on the Prairie	Western	June 14, 2022	DailyWire+	
The Greatest Lie Ever Sold	Documentary	October 12, 2022	DailyWire+	
My Dinner with Trump	Documentary	November 3, 2022	DailyWire+	
Lady Ballers	Comedy	December 1, 2023	DailyWire+	
Sound of Hope: The Story of Possum Trot	Drama	July 4, 2024	Theatrical release	
Am I Racist?	Documentary	September 13, 2024	Theatrical release and DailyWire+	
The Pope and the Führer: The Secret Vatican Files of World War II	Documentary	August 13, 2025	DailyWire+	
Run Hide Fight: Infidels	Action thriller	September 16, 2026	DailyWire+	
Confession	Psychological drama	November 11, 2026	Theatrical release and DailyWire+	
Pawn Shop	Narrative Feature	TBA		Production began in September 2026.

=== Television series ===
Title	Genre	U.S. release date	Platform
What We Saw	Documentary	June 13, 2019 – present	DailyWire+
Adam Carolla Truth Yeller	Comedy podcast	November 25, 2021 – March 24, 2022	DailyWire+
The Enemy Within	Documentary	February 18, 2022	DailyWire+
Fauci Unmasked	Documentary	March 16, 2022	DailyWire+
Exodus	Documentary	November 22, 2022 – May 3, 2023	DailyWire+
Convicting a Murderer	Documentary	September 8, 2023	DailyWire+
Chip Chilla	Animated series	October 16, 2023	Bentkey (Note: Many Bentkey shows have some sample episodes on DailyWire+)
A Wonderful Day with Mabel Maclay	Live-action children's series	October 16, 2023	Bentkey
Gus Plus Us	Puppet	October 16, 2023	Bentkey
Kid Explorer	Live-action children's documentary	October 16, 2023	Bentkey
Kid Fit Go!	Fitness	October 16, 2023	Bentkey
Kid Fit Chef	Cooking	March 16, 2024	Bentkey
Storytime with Zoodles	Art	2025	Bentkey
Mr. Birchum	Adult animation	May 12, 2024	DailyWire+
Parenting	Documentary	2025	DailyWire+
The Pendragon Cycle: Rise of the Merlin	Fantasy	2026	DailyWire+
Atlas Shrugged	Scripted series based on the novel	TBA	DailyWire+

== Products ==
In March 2022, co-founder Jeremy Boreing opened a line of subscription-based shaving razors called Jeremy's Razors, openly competing against former Daily Wire sponsor Harry's Razors. In March 2023, Boreing started selling chocolate bars branded as Jeremy's Chocolate after Hershey's chocolate bars hired a trans woman to be a spokesperson for International Women's Day.

== Reception ==
Fact checkers have said that some stories shared by the Daily Wire are unverified, and that the Daily Wire sometimes misstates facts to advance a partisan view. According to Snopes, "DailyWire.com has a tendency to share stories that are taken out of context or not verified", including an incorrect report on baby names in the Netherlands, a misdated, exaggerated story that protesters were digging up Confederate graves, a false allegation that Democratic congresspeople had refused to stand for a fallen Navy SEAL's widow, and a report that Harvard University was segregating commencement ceremonies (because black students had planned an optional event).

In April 2017, the Daily Wire incorrectly credited the Housing and Urban Development secretary, Ben Carson, with finding over $500 billion in accounting errors made by the Obama administration. FactCheck.org reported that the errors were discovered and published by HUD's independent inspector general before Carson became secretary.

Various articles by The Daily Wire have engaged in climate change denial by making false or misleading claims when they dispute the scientific consensus about climate change. In 2017, when scientists writing in Climate Feedback described several Daily Wire articles as inaccurate or lacking evidence, The Daily Wire published corrections in two articles, after which the scientists assessed that the updated articles were still misleading. In November 2021, a study by the Center for Countering Digital Hate described the Daily Wire as being among "ten fringe publishers" that together were responsible for nearly 70 percent of Facebook user interactions with content that denied climate change. Facebook said the percentage was overstated and called the study misleading.

The "Coronavirus Misinformation Weekly Briefing" by academics of the Oxford Internet Institute described the Daily Wire's coverage of COVID-19 lockdowns and the World Health Organization as examples of "junk health news" narratives in 2020. Multiple scientific studies have identified The Daily Wire as a fake news website. Boston University and Forbes have described the website as far-right.

Media analyst Adam H. Johnson wrote in 2026 that, regarding their coverage of the Gaza genocide, The Daily Wire, along with other conservative media including Fox News, Sinclair News and The Wall Street Journal are, "for the most part, openly genocidal against the Palestinians and make no pretense otherwise."
