= Convicting a Murderer =

2023 American documentary series

- Genre: True crime Documentary
- Inspired by: Making a Murderer
- Directed by: Shawn Rech
- Presented by: Candace Owens
- Composer: Kendall Johnson
- Country of origin: United States
- Original language: English
- No. of seasons: 1
- No. of episodes: 10

Production
- Executive producers: Jeremy Boreing; Ben Shapiro; Caleb Robinson; Ellye Marks; Michael Marks
- Producers: Shawn Rech; Candace Owens; Dallas Sonnier; Brenda Schuler; Michaelan Mela
- Running time: 45 minutes - 80 minutes
- Production company: Transition Studios

Original release
- Network: DailyWire+
- Release: September 7 – October 26, 2023

Convicting a Murderer is an American true crime documentary series narrated and hosted by Candace Owens for The Daily Wire. The show is a rebuttal to the 2015–2018 Netflix documentary series Making a Murderer, which argued for the innocence of Steven Avery, a man convicted of sexual assault and later freed only to be charged with and convicted of the 2005 murder of Teresa Halbach. While Making a Murderer sought to build a case for Avery's innocence in the 2005 case, Convicting a Murderer argues that Avery is in fact guilty, and that Netflix irresponsibly attempted to portray him as innocent for media attention.

The series was produced by Transition Studios and directed by Shawn Rech, who started filming it in early 2018. It was released through DailyWire+ on September 7, 2023. Ed Power of The Telegraph characterized the series as a "crime against TV" that was "baffling" and "tedious".
