= The Ben Shapiro Show =

American conservative political podcast

- Genre: Political commentary; news; conservative talk radio
- Format: Audio; video; radio
- Country of origin: United States
- Language: English

Creative team
- Created by: Jeremy Boreing, Ben Shapiro

Cast and voices
- Hosted by: Ben Shapiro

Production
- Length: 1–2 hours

Publication
- No. of episodes: 2,428 (As of May 18, 2026)
- Original release: 2015 – present
- Provider: The Daily Wire
- Updates: Sunday–Friday

Related
- Related shows: The Andrew Klavan Show; The Michael Knowles Show; The Matt Walsh Show
- Website: www.dailywire.com/show/the-ben-shapiro-show

The Ben Shapiro Show
- Syndicates: Westwood One (2018–2025)

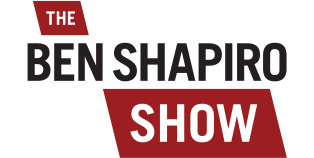
Logo (2019–2023)

The Ben Shapiro Show is a daily conservative political podcast and former live radio show produced by The Daily Wire and hosted by Ben Shapiro. The podcast launched in September 2015. As of November 2025, The Ben Shapiro Show was ranked by Podtrac as the ninth most popular podcast in the U.S., dropping from second place in 2019. Westwood One began syndicating The Ben Shapiro Show podcast to radio in April 2018. In January 2019, Westwood One expanded Shapiro's one-hour podcast-to-radio program, adding a nationally syndicated two-hour live radio show, for three hours of Ben Shapiro programming daily.

== See also ==
- The Daily Wire
- Political podcast
- List of daily news podcasts
