= Shut In (2022 film) =

Thriller film by D. J. Caruso

- Release poster
- Directed by: D. J. Caruso
- Written by: Melanie Toast
- Produced by: Dallas Sonnier; Amanda Presmyk
- Starring: Rainey Qualley; Jake Horowitz; Luciana VanDette; Vincent Gallo
- Cinematography: Akis Konstantakopoulos
- Edited by: Jim Page
- Music by: Mondo Boys
- Production companies: Bonfire Legend; Voltage Pictures; Whitecap Entertainment
- Distributed by: The Daily Wire
- Release date: February 10, 2022
- Running time: 89 minutes
- Country: United States
- Language: English

Shut In is a 2022 American thriller film directed by D. J. Caruso, written by Melanie Toast, and starring Rainey Qualley, Jake Horowitz, Luciana VanDette and Vincent Gallo. Shut In is The Daily Wire's first original film and their third to be released on their streaming platform, DailyWire+.

The Daily Wire hosted a special viewing for the film (an original first), at 9 pm E.T. on February 10, 2022, on the company's YouTube channel. The film received mixed reviews from critics.

== Plot ==
Young mother of two Jessica Nash is in the midst of fixing up the closet of her late grandmother's house (that she inherited) so that she can sell it and move. However, she accidentally gets stuck. She tries to get her young daughter Lainey to help her get out, but Lainey is unable to bring her the key. Jessica's ex-boyfriend Rob shows up with his friend Sammy, and Rob gets her out. However, Jessica is furious with Rob for bringing Sammy, a pedophile, to her house. Sammy manipulates Rob into getting him to put Jessica back into the closet before they leave. However, Sammy later breaks in.

Jessica manages to trick Sammy into reaching under the closet door, where she nails his hand to the ground with a screwdriver that Lainey brought her earlier, trapping Sammy next to her. She yells for Lainey to stay upstairs with her baby brother Mason, but Lainey comes downstairs. Sammy grabs Lainey and threatens to assault her if Jessica doesn't free him, but Jessica sets his hand on fire. This makes Sammy let Lainey go without hurting her. Although Jessica is forced to put out the fire so she doesn't suffocate herself, Sammy's hand is severely burned and mutilated, and it appears as though Sammy is dead.

Jessica removes the screwdriver so she can escape by crawling through the ceiling onto the second storey. She brings Lainey and Mason to the car, but it starts to rain heavily, so Jessica lets her kids go back inside while she gets the door open. However, Sammy is still alive and he grabs the kids. Jessica runs back inside, but Sammy has a knife to Mason's throat.

Rob arrives with a gun and shoots Sammy in the head, and he and Jessica try to reconcile. However, Jessica realizes that Rob will always put his drugs before her and their children, so she slips him three grams of crystal meth. Rob attempts to persuade Jessica to relapse along with him, prompting her to attack him. As Rob is about to inject Jessica, he overdoses, and she pushes him out a window to his death.

Some time later, Jessica and her kids are shown in the house, now cleaned up, making and selling her own apple butter (inspired by her mother's recipe) and mostly happy.

== Cast ==
- Rainey Qualley as Jessica Nash
- Jake Horowitz as Rob
- Vincent Gallo as Sammy
- Luciana VanDette as Lainey Nash
- Aidan Steimer as Mason Nash

== Production ==
Producers Dallas Sonnier and Amanda Presmyk acquired the film's script in 2018 from screenwriter Melanie Toast. Toast's screenplay was featured on the 2019 Black List. The film was initially slated to be produced by New Line Cinema with Jason Bateman attached as the director. After a period of stasis, the film's option expired and Sonnier opted to take it to The Daily Wire.

The Daily Wire revealed Vincent Gallo's casting in the film on December 1, 2021. This marks Gallo's first feature-film role since 2013, when he played Harold Marcus in Human Trust.

== Reception ==
On the review aggregator website Rotten Tomatoes, 55% of 11 critics' reviews are positive.

Conservative reviewer Christian Toto gave the film a score of three out of four, saying: "Shut In lacks the visceral thrills of some invasion films, but it more than compensates with a heart-tugging redemption arc and the return of an electric star." Randy Myers of The Mercury News gave the film a score of 2.5 out of four, saying that it "doesn't redefine the genre by any means but it's a polished exercise in confined terror with a very nasty bite to it." Alan Ng of Film Threat wrote: "D. J. Caruso masterfully orchestrates this symphony of suspense, albeit a twenty-piece symphony, but a symphony nonetheless."

John Semley of The New Republic was more critical, calling the film "dull" and writing: "for all its desperate edginess—drugs, guns, the implicit threat of a child being assaulted, the casting of Vincent Gallo, etc.—it plays like a moralizing Sunday school sermon." Cath Clarke of The Guardian gave it two out of five stars, calling it "a film with some excruciatingly wooden acting – though not by Gallo, whose presence makes every scene he's in about seven times more interesting."
