= LGBTQ Nation =

American online news magazine

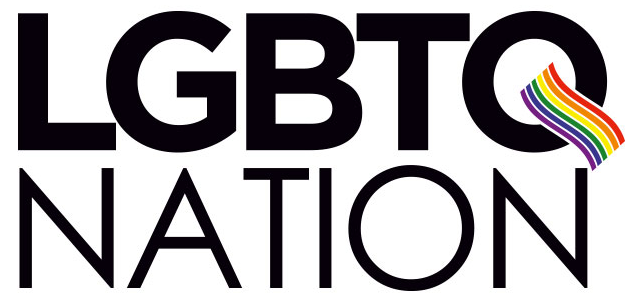
- Editor: Chris Bull; Alex Bollinger; Molly Sprayregen; Daniel Villarreal
- Categories: News magazine
- Publisher: Q.Digital
- Founded: 2009
- Language: English
- Website: www.lgbtqnation.com

LGBTQ Nation is an American online news magazine headquartered in San Francisco, California. It was founded in 2009 and is currently owned by Q Digital. The website is primarily marketed to the lesbian, gay, bisexual, transgender, and queer (LGBTQ) community. Through its parent company, it is affiliated with Queerty, OutSports, GayCities, and INTO.

== History ==
LGBTQ Nation was founded in 2009. It reports on topics that are relevant to the LGBTQ community, and the site is headquartered in San Francisco. It is owned by Q Digital, as are its sister companies, Queerty, GayCities, and INTO. As of 2017, the website had 1.2 million followers on Facebook. Q.Digital says that LGBTQ Nation is "the most visited LGBTQ news site in the US". In 2021, LGBTQ Nation was nominated for the 32nd GLAAD Media Awards.

Milo Yiannopolous was named LGBTQ Nation's "2016 Person of the Year" due to a reader driven poll. LGBTQ Nation, the Anti-Defamation League, and Vocativ said that Yiannopolous's supporters had posted about the poll on sites such as Reddit and 4chan, and that Breitbart News ran stories about the poll. At Yiannopolous's request, the editors of LGBTQ Nation removed a reference to him as "alt right". The decisions to nominate and interview Yiannopolous, as well as to remove the reference to him as "alt right", drew some backlash from the site's readers.

== Content ==
The website covers the subjects of LGBT pride, health, life, and politics. It provided coverage of the 2020 United States presidential election, including exclusive coverage of presidential candidates. This included an op-ed on the site written by Kamala Harris. Commentary by Joe Biden was also published in the outlet. Interviews were held with Pete Buttigieg and Andrew Yang. During the 2020 Democratic presidential primaries, LGBTQ Nation published analysis of each candidate's background concerning LGBT rights.

Interviews with people of interest to the LGBT community have been published to the website. This included interviews with LGBT lawmakers and candidates such as Danica Roem, Mondaire Jones, Taylor Small, Sarah McBride, and Sharice Davids. LGBTQ Nation also held an interview with Gerald Bostock, one of the plaintiffs in the landmark Bostock v. Clayton County ruling.

LGBTQ Nation has provided international news coverage, especially concerning stories pertaining to LGBT topics. During the 2020 US presidential election, it had correspondents across the world. The site has published pieces related to LGBT history, including about the Gay Liberation Front, the Stonewall uprising, and pre-Stonewall LGBT activity.

=== Podcast ===
LGBTQ Nation launched a podcast in 2021, hosted by Alex Berg.

== See also ==
- List of LGBT periodicals
- Gay Star News
- Them (website)
