= Misgendering =

Referring to someone contrary to their gender identity

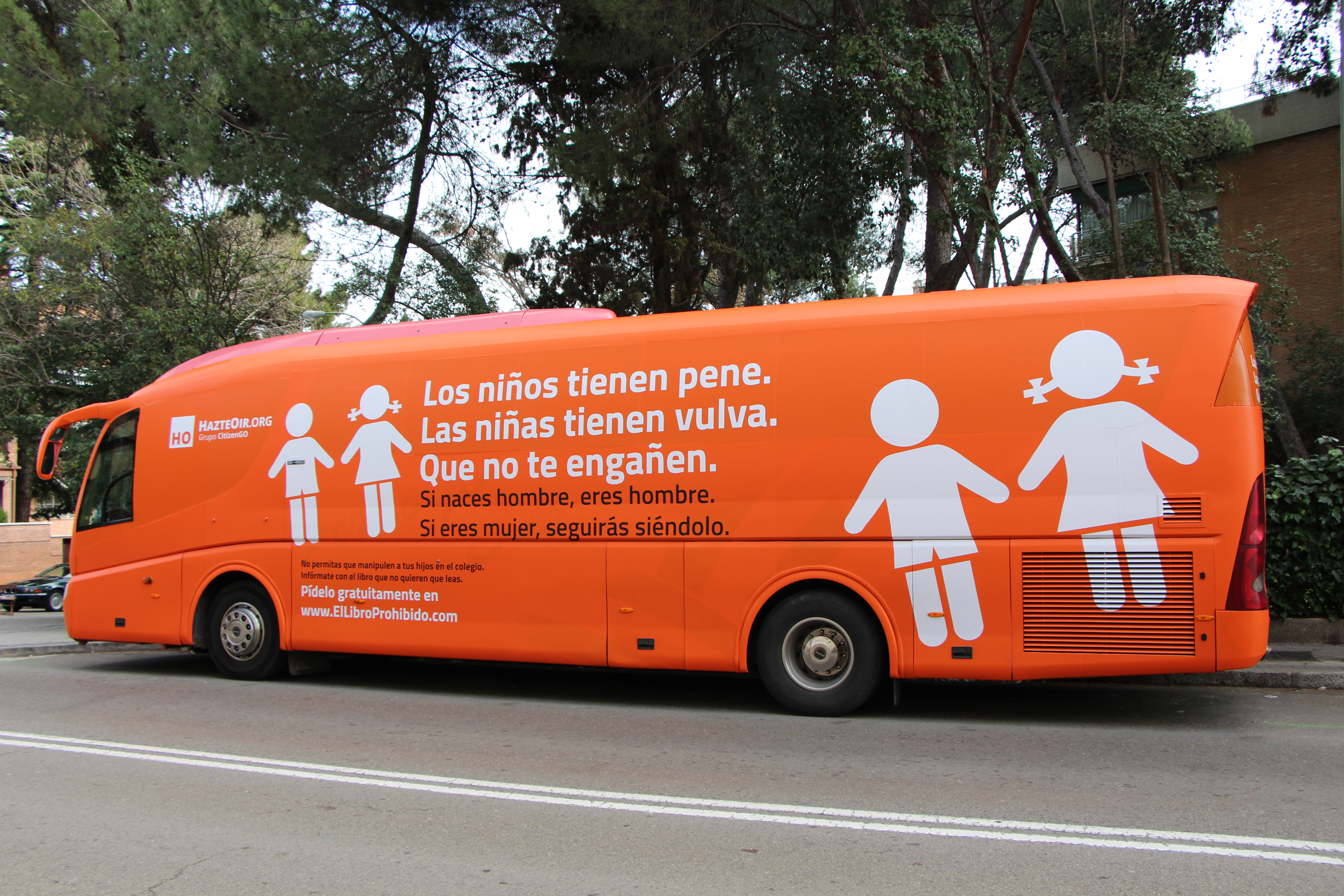
Bus used in a 2017 anti-transgender campaign by the right-wing Spanish organization HazteOir. Top text in Spanish translates to "Boys have a penis. Girls have a vulva. Don't let them deceive you. If you're born a man, you are a man. If you're a woman, you'll keep being one."

Misgendering is the act of labelling or referring to others with a gender that does not match their gender identity. It can be deliberate or accidental. Common examples include use of the wrong pronouns, use of the wrong honorific (e.g. "ma'am" or "sir"), and use of a former name ("deadnaming"). Some researchers also include being required to follow the norms of one's sex, for example in which bathroom to use.

Kelby Harrison writes that being misgendered is a common experience for transgender people before transition, and for many afterwards. Transgender people report being misgendered by doctors, police, media, and peers. Some writers have described the experience as "mortifying", cruel, and "only making our lives harder". A 2018 study of 129 transgender and other gender-expansive youth published in the Journal of Adolescent Health, found that "for each additional social context in which a youth's chosen name was used, there was a statistically significant decrease in depressive symptoms, suicidal ideation, and suicidal behaviors," though the study was "correlational so causality cannot be assumed, and the sample size was small." Deliberately misgendering a transgender person is considered offensive by transgender individuals.

== Law ==
In the United Kingdom, the Employment Appeal Tribunal held in Forstater v CGD Europe (2021) that the "gender-critical" belief that sex is immutable and should not be conflated with gender identity is protected under the Equality Act 2010. The tribunal added that the ruling did not allow people who hold that belief to misgender transgender people with impunity.

In the United States, the Sixth Circuit ruled in Meriwether v. Hartop (2021) that a public university professor who was disciplined for refusing to use a transgender student's preferred pronouns had plausibly alleged violations of his rights to free speech and free exercise of religion. In 2024, the Equal Employment Opportunity Commission issued guidance stating that repeated, intentional misgendering of an employee could be unlawful harassment under Title VII. A federal district court in Texas vacated the gender-identity portions of the guidance in May 2025, and the commission rescinded the guidance in January 2026.
