= Andrew Wilson =

Andrew or Andy Wilson may refer to:

== Arts and media ==
- Andrew Wilson (artist) (1780–1848), Scottish landscape-painter
- Andrew P. Wilson (1886–after 1947), British director, playwright, teacher, and actor
- A. N. Wilson (Andrew Norman Wilson, born 1950), English writer and columnist
- Andrew Wilson (presenter) (born 1960), British news presenter and foreign correspondent
- Andrew Wilson (actor) (born 1964), American actor and director
- Andrew Wilson (musician), frontman for New Zealand punk trio Die! Die! Die!
- Andy Wilson (director) (born 1958), British film, TV and theatre director
- Andrew Norman Wilson (artist) (born 1983), artist and curator
- Andrew Wilson (ballet dancer), ballet dancer, ballet teacher, choreographer and academic administrator
- Andrew Wilson (author) (born 1967), British biographer, novelist and journalist
- Andrew Wilson (pastor), British pastor, author, and columnist
- Andrew Wilson (internet personality), online debator, political commentator, and streamer

== Sports ==
=== Association football (soccer) ===
- Andrew Wilson (football left-back) (fl. 1895–1905), Scottish footballer for Sunderland
- Andrew Wilson (footballer, born 1879) (1879–1945), Scottish footballer
- Andrew Wilson (footballer, born 1896) (1896–1973), Scottish footballer
- Andy Wilson (English footballer) (born 1940), English footballer

=== Water sports ===
- Andy Wilson (swimmer) (born 1947), English swimmer
- Andrew Wilson (canoeist) (born 1964), Australian slalom canoeist
- Andrew Wilson (windsurfer) (born 1975), Maltese windsurfer
- Andrew Wilson (swimmer) (born 1993), American swimmer

=== Other sports ===
- Andy Wilson (cyclist) (1902–1926), British Olympic cyclist
- Andrew Wilson (baseball) (fl. 1923), Negro league baseball player
- Andy Wilson (cricketer) (1910–2002), English first class cricketer
- Andy Wilson (wrestler) (1916–1979), British Olympic wrestler
- Andrew Wilson (curler) (fl. 1960), Scottish curler
- Andy Wilson (Australian rules footballer) (born 1951), Australian rules footballer
- Andrew Wilson (Wellington cricketer) (1954–2018), New Zealand cricketer
- Andy Wilson (rugby league) (born 1963), English rugby league player
- Andrew Wilson (rugby union) (born 1980), South African born Scottish rugby union footballer
- Andrew Wilson (basketball) (born 1982), American college basketball player and coach
- Andrew Wilson (golfer) (born 1994), English golfer

== Other ==
- Andrew Wilson (traveller) (1831–1881), Scottish traveller and author
- Andrew Wilson (Australian politician) (1844–1906), politician in Queensland, Australia
- Andrew Wilson (zoologist) (1852–1912), Scottish physiologist, zoologist and author
- Andrew Wilson (architect) (1866–1950), Western Australian architect
- Andrew Wilson (RAF officer) (born 1941), Royal Air Force commander
- Andrew Wilson (academic) (born 1950), American religious scholar
- Andrew Wilson (garden designer) (born 1959), British garden designer, lecturer and writer
- Andrew Wilson (historian) (born 1961), British historian
- Andrew Wilson (classical archaeologist) (born 1968), British archaeologist
- Andrew Wilson (economist) (born 1970), Scottish politician
- Andrew Wilson (businessman) (born 1974), present CEO of Electronic Arts
- Andrew Stephen Wilson (1947–2008), astronomer
- Andy Wilson (politician), attorney general of Ohio (2026-present)
- John Andrew Wilson, Canadian politician

== Fiction ==
- Instinct (American TV series)#Main

== See also ==
- Drew Wilson (born 1967), British cyclist
