= Andrew Norman Wilson =

Andrew Norman Wilson may refer to:

- A. N. Wilson (born 1950), English writer and newspaper columnist
- Andrew Norman Wilson (artist) (born 1983), American artist

== See also ==
- Andrew Norman (disambiguation)
- Andrew Wilson (disambiguation)
- Norman Wilson (disambiguation)
