= Peppermint Park =

Peppermint Park may refer to:

- Peppermint Park, Texas, a defunct amusement park
- Peppermint Park (TV series), an American direct-to-video children's show (1987 and 1988)
- Peppermint Park, Adelaide Park Lands in South Australia
- Peppermint Park, a former theme park in Port Macquarie, Australia
