= Andrew Wilson (pastor) =

British author and pastor

Andrew Wilson is an English author of Christian books and a columnist for Christianity Today. He is also the teaching pastor at King's Church London.

== Biography ==
Wilson was born in London and went to a boarding school in Eastbourne when he was 13. Later he attended Cambridge University, London School of Theology and King’s College London, and has degrees in history and theology.

His books include Deluded by Dawkins? (2007), If God, Then What? (2012), Spirit and Sacrament: An Invitation to Eucharismatic Worship (2019), God of All Things: Rediscovering the Sacred in an Everyday World (2021), Incomparable: Explorations in the Character of God (2021), and Remaking the World: How 1776 Created the Post-Christian West (2023), which won a Gospel Coalition award.

He has also written children's books, including Sophie and the Heidelberg Cat (2019), with illustrations by Helena Perez Garcia, and The Boy from the House of Bread (2022), with illustrations by Arief Putra.

Wilson is married to Rachel and they have three children, two of whom have special needs, which he and his wife wrote about in their book, The Life We Never Expected: Hopeful Reflections on the Challenges of Parenting Children with Special Needs (2016).

He has also won an Evangelical Press Association award for his Christianity Today column.

== External link ==
- Think
