= Norman Wilson =

Norman Wilson may refer to:

- Norman D. Wilson (engineer) (1884–1967), Canadian transportation engineer
- Norman Frank Wilson (1876–1956), Canadian farmer and political figure
- Norman Wilson (baseball) for Hopkinsville Hoppers
- Norman Wilson (footballer) (1901-1945), English footballer, see List of Bury F.C. players (1–24 appearances)
- Norman Wilson (rugby union) (1922–2001), New Zealand rugby union player
- Norm Wilson (footballer) (1927–2011), Australian rules footballer
- Norman Wilson (graphic designer) (1931-1991), English graphic designer
- Norm Wilson (cricketer) (1931–2018), New Zealand cricketer
- Norman D. Wilson (actor) (1938-2004), American actor
- Norman Wilson (The Wire), fictional character on the television drama The Wire

== See also ==
- A. N. Wilson (Andrew Norman Wilson, born 1950), English writer and newspaper columnist
- Andrew Norman Wilson (artist) (born 1983), American artist and curator
