= Andrew Norman (disambiguation) =

Andrew Norman (born 1979) is an American composer of contemporary classical music.

Andrew Norman may also refer to:

- Andrew Norman (snooker player) (born 1980), former English professional snooker player from Bristol
- Andrew Norman (rugby league) (born 1972), Papua New Guinean rugby league footballer who played in the 1990s and 2000s
- Andrew Norman Meldrum (1876–1934), Scottish scientist
- Andrew Norman (priest) (born 1963), principal of Ridley Hall, Cambridge
- Andrew Norman Wilson (artist) (born 1983), artist and curator from New York City
