= Candace Owens =

American podcaster (born 1989)

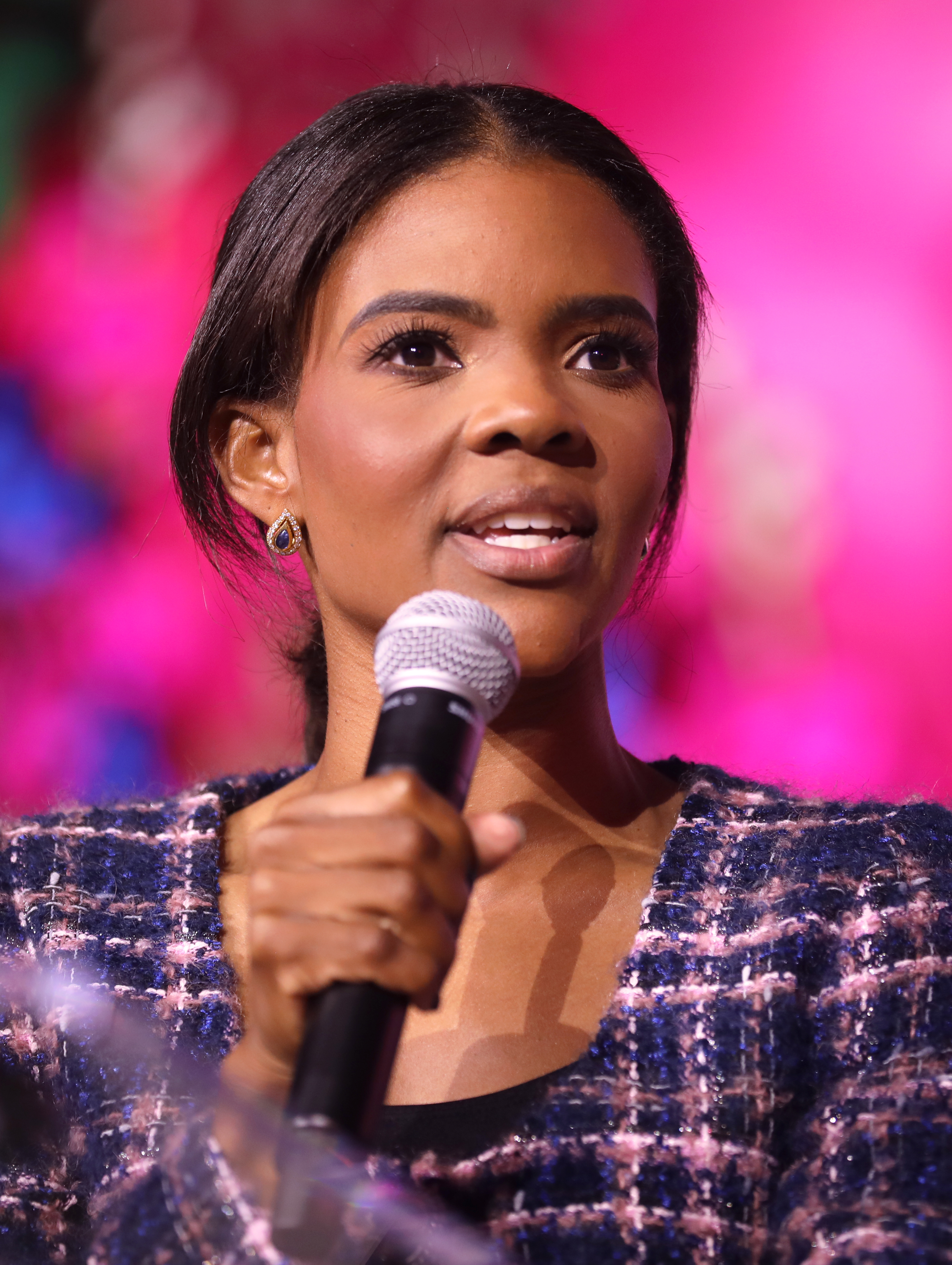
- Owens in 2024
- Born: Candace Amber Owens; April 29, 1989 (age 37); White Plains, New York, U.S.
- Education: University of Rhode Island (Attended, did not graduate)
- Occupations: Podcaster; political commentator; author
- Years active: 2017–present
- Political party: Republican
- Spouse: George Farmer (m. 2019)
- Children: 4
- Relatives: The Lord Farmer (father-in-law)

YouTube information
- Channel: Candace Owens
- Years active: 2015–present
- Genre: Political criticism
- Subscribers: 6 million
- Views: 1.4 billion
- Owens's voice Owens speaks on white nationalism in the United States. Recorded April 9, 2019
- Last updated: June 9, 2026
- Website: candaceowens.com

Candace Amber Owens Farmer (née Owens; born April 29, 1989) is an American far-right podcaster, political commentator, and author. She has promoted conspiracy theories on a wide range of subjects throughout her career.

Owens has gained recognition for her conservative activism—despite being initially critical of President Donald Trump and the Republican Party—as well as her criticism of Black Lives Matter. Owens was the communications director for the conservative advocacy group Turning Point USA (TPUSA) from 2017 to 2019. In 2018, Owens co-founded the BLEXIT Foundation along with former Tucson police officer Brandon Tatum. After working for PragerU, in 2021 Owens joined The Daily Wire and began hosting Candace, a political talk show. She was dismissed in March 2024 following a series of comments regarded as antisemitic, and months of tensions with co-host Ben Shapiro and other Daily Wire staff.

Owens has expressed skepticism about the extent of white supremacy's impact on society and has voiced opposition to both COVID-19 lockdowns and COVID-19 vaccines. Owens is a critic of Israel and was increasingly critical of the country's ongoing Gaza war, culminating in her disavowal of Trump and the MAGA movement in 2026. Since 2023, Owens has espoused antisemitic tropes. (Note: Sources describing Owens as espousing antisemitic conspiracy theories include: "Candace Owens". Anti-Defamation League. August 27, 2024.; Reeve, Elle (December 16, 2025). "Candace Owens won't take back conspiracies about Charlie Kirk's death after meeting with Erika Kirk". CNN.; Sommer, Will (March 22, 2024). "Candace Owens departs Ben Shapiro's website after antisemitic commentary". The Washington Post. Archived from the original on March 22, 2024.; Smith, Peter (February 11, 2026). "Member of Trump's Religious Liberty Commission ousted in dispute over antisemitism". The Associated Press.; Brumfiel, Geoff (November 7, 2025). "Support for Israel among U.S. conservatives is starting to crack. Here's why". National Public Radio.) In the wake of Charlie Kirk's 2025 assassination, Owens has popularized numerous conspiracy theories about his death, alleging the involvement of Turning Point USA staff, Kirk's widow, and the governments of Israel, Egypt, and France.

== Early life and education ==
Candace Amber Owens was born on April 29, 1989, in White Plains, New York, and grew up in Stamford, Connecticut. She was raised mostly by her mother and grandparents from around the age of 11 or 12, after her parents divorced. She is the third of four children. Her paternal grandfather was Robert Owens, an African American who was born in North Carolina. Owens is also of Caribbean American heritage through her grandmother, who is originally from Saint Thomas, U.S. Virgin Islands.

She is a graduate of Stamford High School in Connecticut. In 2007, while a 17-year-old senior at Stamford High School, Owens received three racist death threat voicemail messages, totaling two minutes, from a group of white male classmates, which included the son of then-mayor and future Democratic governor Dannel Malloy. Owens's family sued the Stamford Board of Education in federal court, alleging that the city did not protect her rights, resulting in a $37,500 settlement in January 2008.

Owens pursued an undergraduate degree in journalism at the University of Rhode Island for three years, but left before completing her degree to pursue a career in New York City. After leaving college, she worked as an intern for Vogue magazine in New York. According to Owens, she took a job in 2012 as an administrative assistant for an unnamed private equity firm in Manhattan, later moving up to become its vice president of administration.

== Early career ==
=== Degree180 and anti-conservative blog ===
In 2015, Owens was CEO of Degree180, a marketing agency that offered consultation, production, and planning services that included a blog on a variety of topics written by Owens and other commentators. In a 2015 column that Owens wrote for the site, she criticized conservative Republicans, writing about the "bat-shit-crazy antics of the Republican Tea Party"; she also added that "The good news is, they will eventually die off (peacefully in their sleep, we hope), and then we can get right on with the OBVIOUS social change that needs to happen, IMMEDIATELY." She was also critical of Donald Trump. In 2016, the blog featured an article mocking Donald Trump's penis size.

=== Privacy violation, Gamergate, and political transformation ===
Owens launched SocialAutopsy.com in 2016, a website she said would expose bullies on the Internet by tracking their digital footprint. The site would have solicited users to take screenshots of offensive posts and send them to the website, where they would be categorized by the user's name. She used crowdfunding on Kickstarter for the website. The proposal was immediately controversial, drawing criticism that Owens was de-anonymizing (doxing) Internet users and violating their privacy. According to The Daily Dot, "People from all sides of the anti-harassment debate were quick to criticize the database, calling it a public shaming list that would encourage doxing and retaliatory harassment." Both conservatives and progressives condemned the website.

In response, people began posting Owens's private details online. With scant evidence, Owens blamed the doxing on progressives. Following that, she earned the support of conservatives involved in the Gamergate harassment campaign, including right-wing political commentators such as Milo Yiannopoulos and Mike Cernovich. Subsequently, Owens became a conservative, saying in 2017, "I became a conservative overnight ... I realized that liberals were actually the racists. Liberals were actually the trolls ... Social Autopsy is why I'm conservative." Kickstarter suspended funding for Social Autopsy, and the website was never created.

== Conservative activism ==
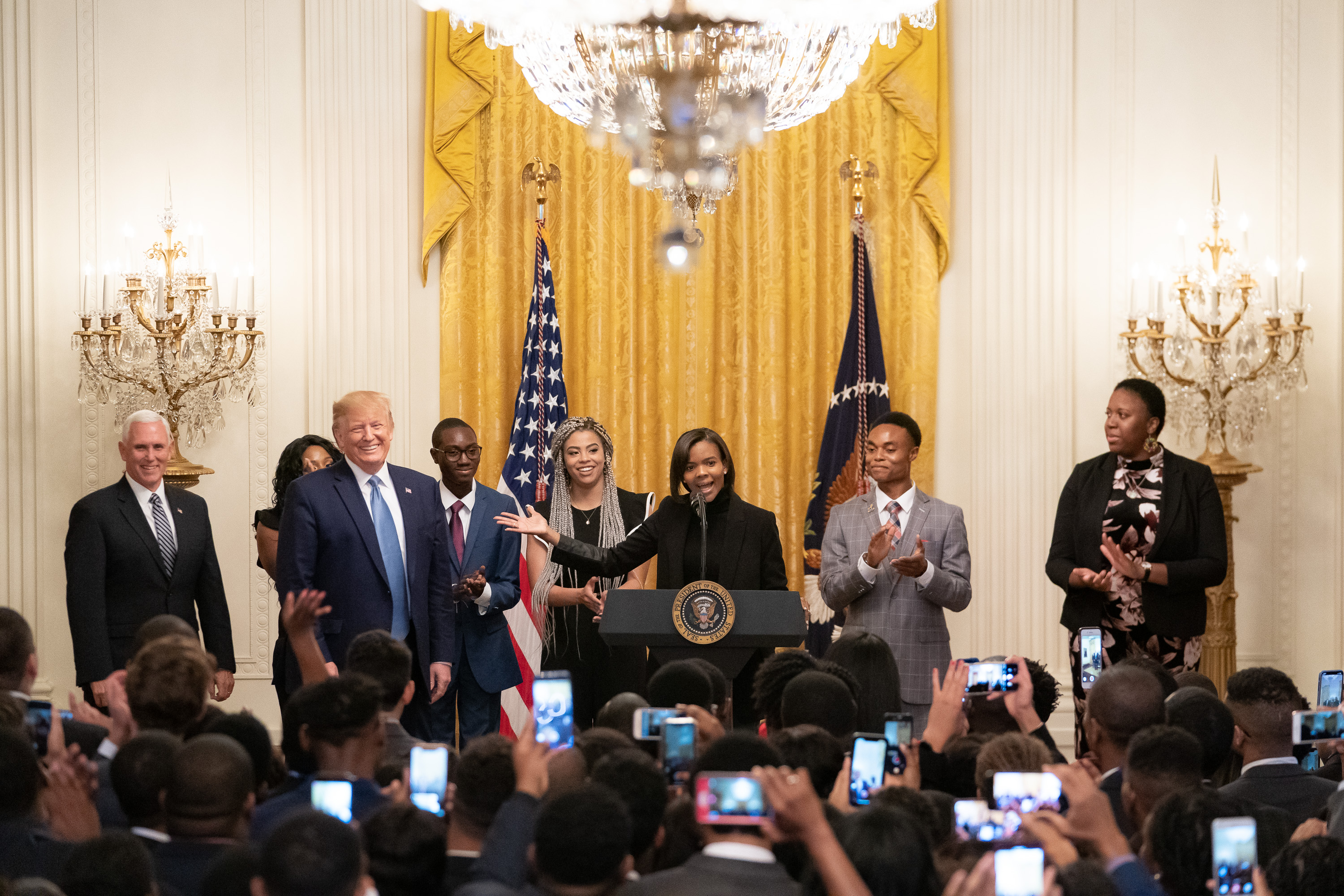
Owens speaking at the White House in 2019

By late 2017, Owens had started producing pro-Trump commentary and criticizing notions of structural racism, systemic inequality, and identity politics – all positions she herself had been publishing two years earlier. In August 2017, she began posting politically themed videos to YouTube. In September 2017, she launched "Red Pill Black", a website and YouTube channel that promotes black conservatism in the United States. The name is a reference to the red pill and blue pill metaphor from The Matrix franchise, often used by the manosphere, where taking the red pill shows its users the "truth."

On November 21, 2017, at the MAGA Rally and Expo in Rockford, Illinois, Turning Point USA founder Charlie Kirk announced that Owens had been hired as the organization's director of urban engagement. Turning Point's hiring of Owens occurred in the wake of allegations of racism at Turning Point. In May 2019, Owens announced her departure as communications director for the organization. While at Turning Point USA, Owens received the support of prominent figures in the Republican Party. President Trump called her a "very smart thinker", while Republican National Committee chair Ronna Romney McDaniel said at Conservative Political Action Conference (CPAC) "People like Candace Owens, like Charlie Kirk, we need more leaders like that." Ted Cruz expressed his admiration for Owens by jokingly suggesting in 2022 that she be appointed to the Supreme Court of the United States.

In April 2018, Kanye West tweeted: "I love the way Candace Owens thinks." The tweet was met with derision on the part of many of West's fans. In May 2019, Owens hosted The Candace Owens Show on PragerU's YouTube channel.

In April 2020, Owens announced her intention to either run for office in the U.S. Senate or to be a governor, and that she would only run against an incumbent Democrat, not a Republican. She did not reveal which specific office she would run for, or in which election cycle. In February 2021, Owens tweeted that she was considering a run for president in 2024.

=== The Daily Wire ===
Owens left PragerU in 2020 to host Candace, a show on The Daily Wire. The show premiered on the platform on March 19, 2021. Its episodes were filmed in front of a live studio audience and aired weekly. Notable guests included Donald Trump, UFC president Dana White, and U.S. Representative Jim Jordan.

Jeremy Boreing announced Owens would be leaving The Daily Wire in March 2024, a move believed to be related to a string of comments considered to be antisemitic, culminating in Owens liking a tweet referencing blood libel. There had also been months of tensions with co-host Ben Shapiro and other Daily Wire staff.

=== BLEXIT Foundation ===
The original Blexit movement was started in 2016 by Me'Lea Connelly to achieve Black economic independence by encouraging Black Americans to leave the traditional financial systems that have historically disadvantaged the Black community. Owens co-founded an unrelated BLEXIT Foundation along with former Tucson police officer Brandon Tatum.

In late 2018, Owens launched the BLEXIT Foundation, which featured a social media campaign to encourage ethnic minorities, including African Americans and Latinos, to leave the Democratic Party and register as Republicans. At the time, 8% of black Americans identified as Republicans.

At the launch in October 2018, Owens said that her "dear friend and fellow superhero Kanye West" designed merchandise for the movement; the following day, West denied being the designer and disavowed the effort, saying: "I never wanted any association with Blexit ... I've been used to spread messages I don't believe in." After an apology, West continued to support Owens as of September 2020.

In 2023, BLEXIT Foundation merged with Turning Point USA, the non-profit organization for which Owens had formerly worked.

=== Product promotion ===
In July 2021, Owens announced the launch of a device named the Freedom Phone, which sold for $500, was marketed toward Trump supporters and that she claimed was "not controlled by Apple or Google". The device's launch was criticized by tech publications for a lack of transparency about the device, as well as security concerns. The device was later revealed to be a white-label version of the Umidigi A9 Pro, a Chinese smartphone available for $120, and its "uncensorable" PatriApp store is a rebranded version of Aurora Store, an open-source frontend for the Google Play Store.

In August 2022, Owens promoted GloriFi, an "anti-woke" startup bank, at a CPAC event, and promoted it on her social media accounts that October. The bank shut down in November after failing to secure additional funding.

=== Post-Daily Wire career ===
Following her firing from The Daily Wire, Owens began a new YouTube channel, running it independently. It had over 6 million subscribers as of June 2026.

In February 2025, she announced working on a media series titled "Harvey Speaks" on Harvey Weinstein. She said she had been in contact with him by phone since his second conviction. Owens has said Weinstein was "wrongfully convicted" of rape and sexual assault.

== Political views ==
Owens said she had no interest in politics whatsoever before 2015, but previously identified as liberal. In October 2018, she said that she had never voted and had only recently become a registered Republican. In January 2019, Owens stated: "The left hates America, and Trump loves it." She added that the left is "destroying everything through this cultural Marxist ideology".

The Washington Post has called Owens "the new face of black conservatism". The Guardian has described her as "ultra-conservative", and New York magazine and the Columbia Journalism Review have described her as "right-wing". Multiple media outlets have called Owens a far-right commentator. She was influenced by the works of Ann Coulter, Milo Yiannopoulos, Ben Carson, and Thomas Sowell.

=== Anti-black racism and Black Lives Matter ===
Owens is known for her criticism of the Black Lives Matter movement, and has described Black Lives Matter protesters as "a bunch of whiny toddlers, pretending to be oppressed for attention". Owens has argued that African Americans have a victim mentality, often referring to the Democratic Party as a "plantation", stating in 2020: "Black lives only matter to white liberals every four years—ahead of an election." She has also argued that the American Left likes "black people to be government-dependent", and that black people have been brainwashed to vote for Democrats. Furthermore, Owens has argued that police brutality in the United States and instances of police killing black people are not sourced in racism, but typically occur when the officer feels his life is under threat, adding a police officer is eighteen-and-a-half times more likely to die at the hands of a black person than vice versa.

She has said that "black Americans are doing worse off economically today than we were doing in the 1950s under Jim Crow", adding that this is because "we've only been voting for one party since then." She has attributed economic improvements for African Americans, such as a low unemployment rate, to Trump's presidency. On several occasions, Owens has claimed that the effects of white supremacy and white nationalism are exaggerated and would not reach her own personal top 100 list of modern issues facing black America, especially when compared to other issues facing black Americans, such as black-on-black crime and illiteracy rates.

When asked if it was problematic that white supremacist groups, such as the Ku Klux Klan (KKK), support Trump, Owens answered that antifa was more prevalent than the KKK. Owens has said that the media cover the KKK during Trump's presidency to hurt him. In a 2019 hearing on hate crimes, Owens referred to the KKK as a "Democrat terrorist organization". After the 2017 Unite the Right rally in Charlottesville, Virginia, Owens said that concern over rising white nationalism was "stupid". She has also called it "just election rhetoric". In 2018, Owens dismissed reports of a resurgence in hate crimes, saying "All of the violence this year primarily happened because of people on the left."

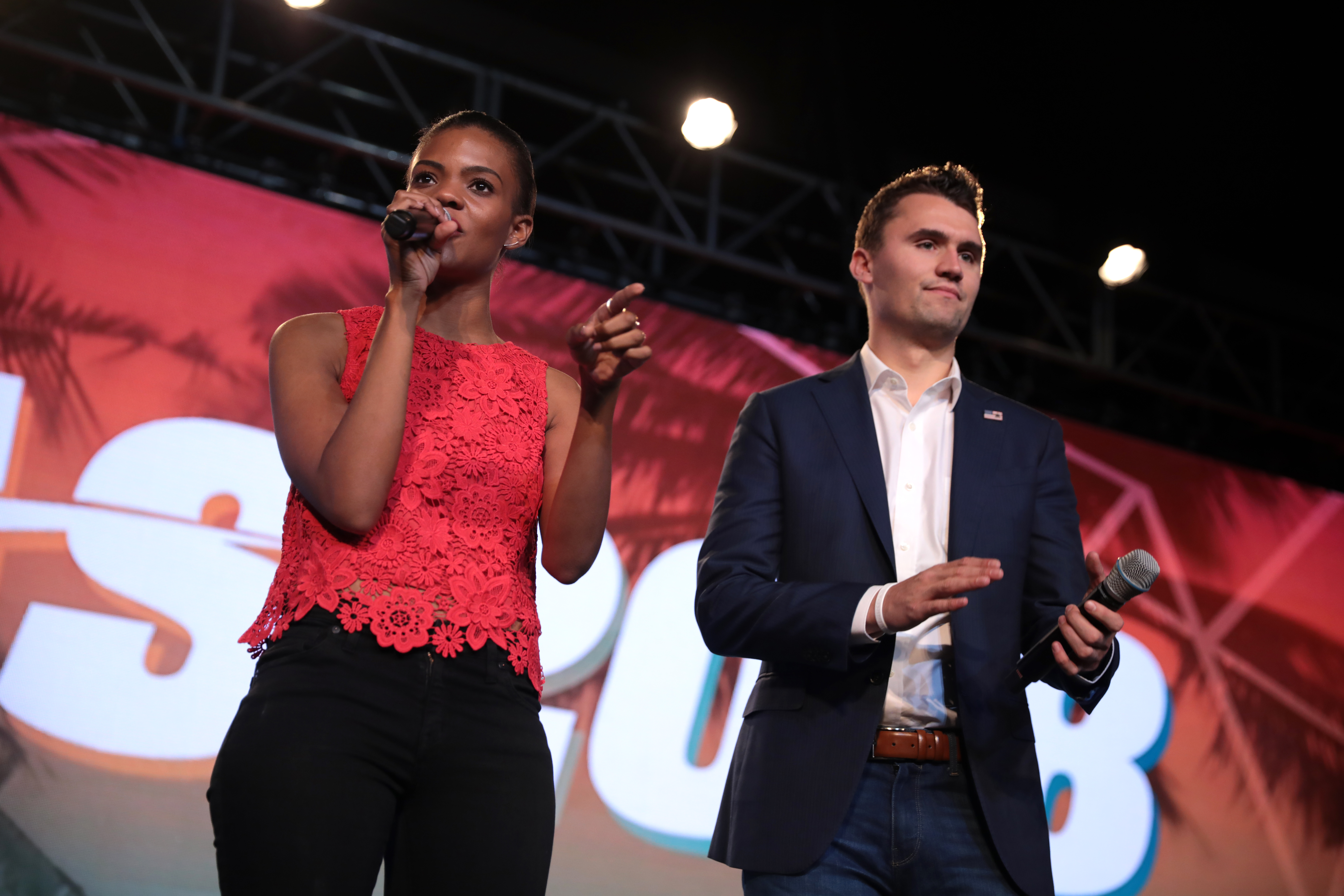
Owens and Charlie Kirk in West Palm Beach, Florida, December 22, 2018

During her April 2019 testimony before the U.S. House Judiciary Committee on the rise of hate crimes and white supremacists in the United States, Owens made the claim that the Southern strategy employed by the Republican Party to increase political support among white voters in the South by appealing to racism against African Americans was a "myth" that "never happened". This was disputed by several historians who said that the existence of the Southern strategy was well documented in contemporaneous sources dating back to the Civil Rights era, with historian Kevin M. Kruse, who writes critically about modern conservatism, calling Owens' statement "utter nonsense". In June 2019, Owens said that African Americans had it better in the first 100 years after the abolition of slavery in the United States than they have since, and that socialism was at fault.

In June 2020, Owens claimed that George Soros paid people to protest the murder of George Floyd, later claiming on Tucker Carlson's show Tucker Carlson Tonight that he did so to "destabilize" America, which the Anti-Defamation League said featured a common antisemitic trope. Shortly afterwards, she argued that George Floyd "was not a good person. I don't care who wants to spin that." She said: "The fact that he has been held up as a martyr sickens me." Then-President Trump retweeted Owens' remarks about Floyd. In a Facebook video that garnered nearly 100 million views, Owens called Floyd a "horrible human being", citing his criminal record, and called racial biases among police a "fake narrative". On April 20, 2021, Owens claimed that the trial of Derek Chauvin, the former police officer who was convicted of murdering Floyd, was "mob justice". She added: "This was not a fair trial. No person can say this was a fair trial."

=== Women's rights ===
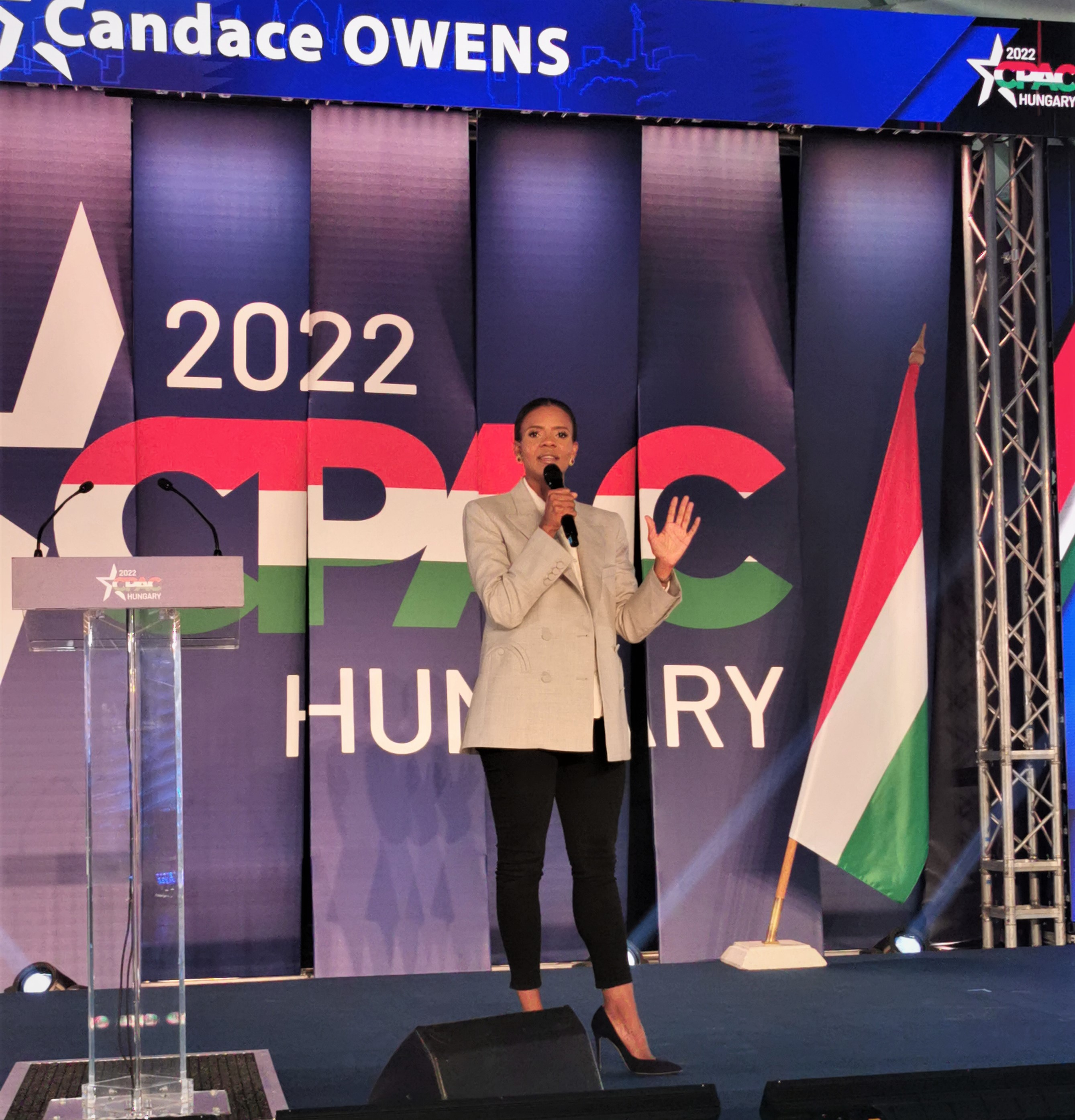
Speaking at CPAC Hungary 2022

Owens is critical of feminism and embraces the "trad wife" phenomenon of traditional gender roles. She has described the #MeToo movement, an international movement against sexual harassment and sexual assault, as "stupid". Owens wrote that the movement was premised on the idea that "women are stupid, weak & inconsequential".

She opposes abortion, which she has called a tool for the "extermination of black babies".

In May 2018, Owens suggested that "something bio-chemically happens" to women who do not marry or have children, and she linked to the Twitter handles of Sarah Silverman, Chelsea Handler, and Kathy Griffin, saying that they were "evidentiary support" of this theory. Silverman responded: "It seems to me that by tweeting this, you would like to maybe make us feel badly. I'd say this is evidenced by ur [sic] effort to use our twitter handles so we would see. My heart breaks for you, Candy. I hope you find happiness in whatever form that takes." Owens responded, accusing Silverman of supporting terrorists and criminal gangs.

=== LGBT rights ===
On July 28, 2017, Owens stated she was in favor of banning transgender individuals who are undergoing sex reassignment surgery from serving in the United States military but said that she did not oppose fully transitioned transgender individuals serving in the U.S. military. In her biography, Blackout: How Black America Can Make Its Second Escape from the Democrat Plantation, in the chapter "On Overcivilization – The Trend Towards Overcivilization", she talks about her view between civilization, in which she described as when basic rights and liberties have been ensured for all, and "overcivilization" in the following quote:

Civilization was achieved for gay couples in the United States when the Supreme Court ruled in favor of same-sex marriage in 2015. Overcivilization, however, is the LGBTQ community's current quest for transgender rights, or, more accurately described, the demand that biological men who self-identify as women be granted legal permission to use ladies' restrooms and dominate women's sports competitions.

— Candace Owens, Blackout: How Black America Can Make Its Second Escape from the Democrat Plantation

In April 2022, she called The Walt Disney Company "child groomers and pedophiles" and called for the boycott of the company, after Disney announced its opposition to Florida House Bill 1557, officially known as the "Parental Rights in Education Act", and commonly described as the "Don't Say Gay" legislation.

In May 2022, Owens falsely claimed on Twitter that the gunman involved in the Robb Elementary School shooting could be transgender and said that he was "cross-dressing". According to Owens, this was evidence that "there were plenty of signs that he was mentally disturbed". In June 2022, she described Drag Queen Story Hour as "child abuse", arguing that parents who take their children to a drag queen story hour "are underqualified to have children" and "should have their children taken away from them".

In a January 2024 tweet, Owens accused transgender people of "mass drugging children" and claimed the "LGBTQ movement brought with it a sexual plague on our society". These comments were condemned by LGBTQ rights groups.

=== Donald Trump ===
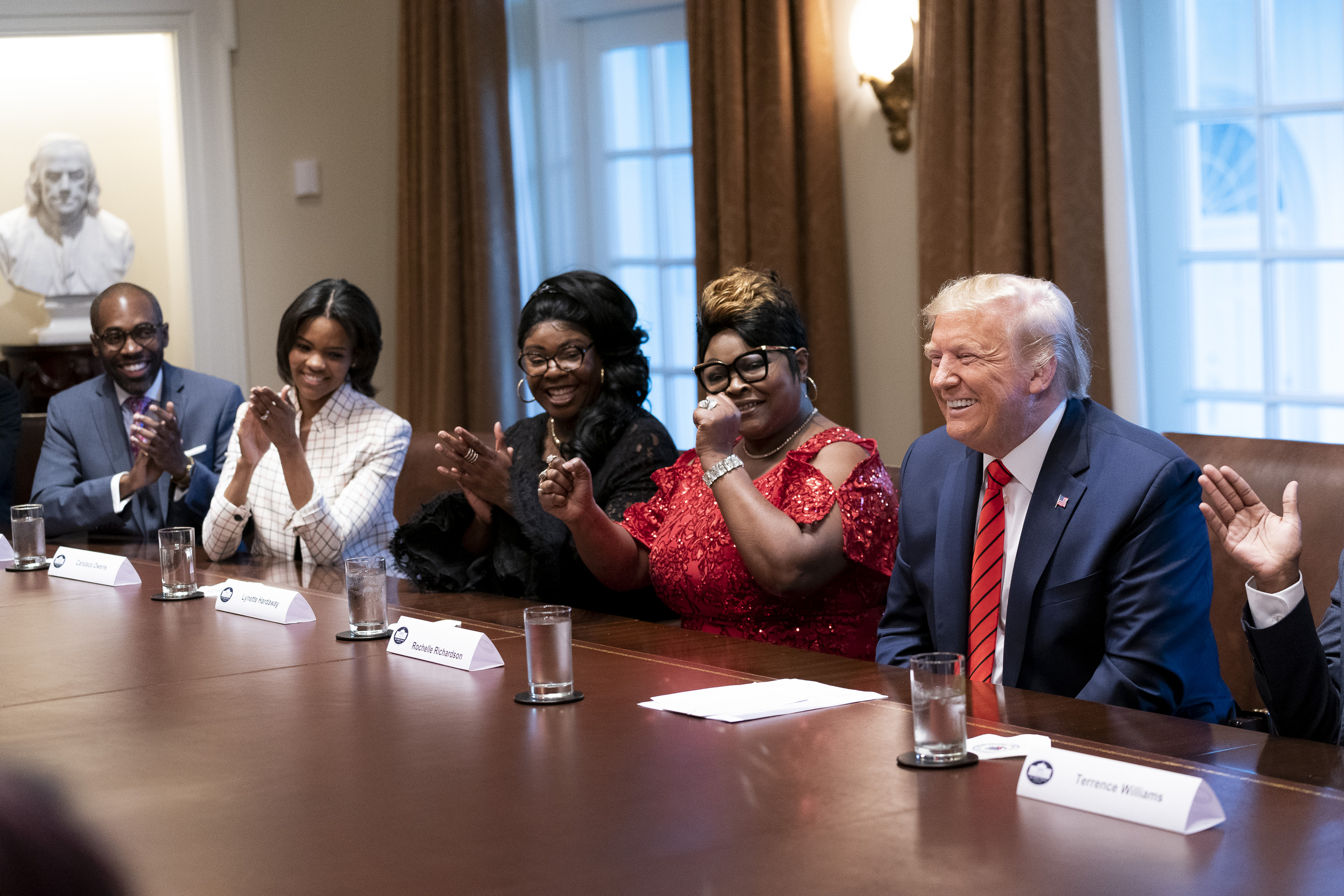
Owens with President Trump and Diamond and Silk celebrating Black History Month at the White House on February 27, 2020

Although in 2015 Owens posted anti-Trump and anti-conservative articles on her Degree180 blog, in 2017 she began describing herself as a conservative Donald Trump supporter. Owens has since characterized Trump as the "savior" of Western civilization. She has argued that Trump has neither engaged in rhetoric that is harmful to African Americans, nor proposed policies that would harm African Americans.

In May 2018, Trump said that Owens "is having a big impact on politics in our country. She represents an ever-expanding group of very smart 'thinkers', and it is wonderful to watch and hear the dialogue going on... so good for our Country!" She registered as a Republican in 2018, after the Brett Kavanaugh Supreme Court nomination. She objected to what she termed the "social lynching" of Kavanaugh, on the grounds that to "believe women" was the reason "our ancestors got lynched", as she told a journalist from Philadelphia magazine. She added: "No evidence, but believe all women." After Joe Biden won the 2020 U.S. presidential election and Trump refused to concede, Owens promoted Trump's false claims of mass fraud, saying that "the American election was clearly rigged."

In 2025, Owens called Trump "a chronic disappointment. And I feel embarrassed that I told people to go vote for him." Owens said Trump's bombing of Iran is "utterly deranged". Owens also criticized the Trump administration's decision to freeze $2.2 billion in federal funding for Harvard University after sending a list of demands for student programming. "I never thought that I would see a day where I would be rooting for a university above Donald J. Trump and his administration," she said. "But I don't recognize this administration right now. I don't recognize what's happening," said Owens.

In April 2026, amid the 2026 Iran War, Trump threatened Iran and wrote on social media: "A whole civilization will die tonight, never to be brought back again". Owens subsequently labeled Trump a "genocidal lunatic", and called for the Twenty-fifth Amendment to be invoked.

=== Immigration ===
Owens is a proponent of the Mexico–United States border wall, and believes illegal immigrants to the United States should be immediately deported. In 2018, Owens warned that "Europe will fall and become a Muslim-majority continent by 2050. There has never been a Muslim-majority country where sharia law was not implemented." She suggested that the United States would then be "forced to save" the British.

=== Science ===
Owens has described science as a "pagan faith" and expressed interest in pseudoscientific conspiracy theories such as flat Earth. She stated, "I'm not a flat-earther. I'm not a round-earther. Actually, what I am is I am somebody who has left the cult of science".

On the topic of injections that are routinely given to newborns to prevent vitamin K deficiency bleeding, Owens said, "What Big Pharma is saying is that we realize that babies were born wrong. They don't have enough vitamin K, and so we're going to give them what they always needed. God designed us wrong." Some parents have cited her statement in support of their decision to refuse vitamin K injections at birth, with doctors expressing concern about the increasing number of refusals in recent years.

=== Climate change ===
In July 2018, Owens claimed that global warming is not real, calling it a lie used to "extract dollars from Americans". In 2021, she promoted paid ads on Facebook, calling the U.S. government "modern doomsayers" who have been wrongly predicting climate crises for decades.

=== Welfare ===
Owens has expressed a critical stance on welfare programs, arguing that they can create dependency and discourage self-reliance among recipients. She believes that welfare reform is necessary to promote individual responsibility and empower individuals to break free from government assistance. Owens has said that welfare is a Democratic Party tool to keep black Americans dependent upon the government.

=== Adolf Hitler and Nazi Germany ===
Owens testifies in the U.S. Congress on hate crimes and white nationalism in the United States on April 9, 2019

At the launch of Turning Point's British offshoot Turning Point UK in December 2018, Owens made comments about Adolf Hitler. She was responding to an audience member who asked for a "long-term prognosis" about the terms "globalism" and "nationalism". Owens said:

I actually don't have any problems at all with the word "nationalism". I think that the definition gets poisoned by elitists that actually want globalism. Globalism is what I don't want. Whenever we say "nationalism" the first thing people think about, at least in America, is Hitler. You know, [Hitler] was a national socialist, but if Hitler just wanted to make Germany great and have things run well, okay, fine. The problem is that he wanted—he had dreams outside of Germany. He wanted to globalize. He wanted everybody to be German, everybody to be speaking German. Everybody to look a different way. That's not, to me, that's not nationalism.

Following heavy criticism for her comments, Owens clarified them on Twitter and in a Judiciary Committee hearing in the U.S. House of Representatives in February 2019. Owens said that "[Hitler] was a homicidal, psychopathic, maniac that killed his own people" and "[Hitler] was not a nationalist, [he] murdered his own people; a nationalist would not kill their own people". She said that the point of her comments was to say that there is "no excuse or defense ever for ... everything that [Hitler] did". She also said that her comments were about Hitler's crimes against Jews.

Owens' comments about Hitler were played in April 2019 by Representative Ted Lieu during testimony in front of the House Judiciary Committee about the issue of increasing hate crimes and white supremacy in America. Lieu said that he did not know Owens and was just going to let her own words characterize her, before playing the audio clip. Owens responded that Lieu had deliberately omitted an interviewer's question that provided critical context to her words, with the intent of misrepresenting them as an endorsement of Hitler, to smear her reputation. She concluded this testimony by stating her opinion Lieu was "assuming that black people will not pursue the full two hour clip" and that the full clip had been "purposefully extracted" in order to "create a different narrative". Donald Trump Jr. praised Owens on Twitter for "[calling] out the Dems on their purposeful manipulation of facts for their narrative".

==== Holocaust denial ====
Owens has expressed interest in Holocaust denial. In July 2024, Owens released an episode of the Candace show on YouTube entitled "Literally Hitler. Why Can't We Talk About Him?" During this episode, Owens criticized mainstream narratives regarding Nazi Germany, saying that education about the Nazis was indoctrination comparable to "Soviet tactics". Owens further denied that Nazi medical experiments were carried out by Josef Mengele on concentration camp inmates, claiming the fact that such experiments occurred was "bizarre propaganda. The idea that they just cut a human up and then sewed them back together. Why would you do that? Even if you're the most evil person in the world, that's a tremendous waste of time and supplies." Owens referred to the Holocaust as "an ethnic cleansing [that] almost took place", while criticizing the expulsion of Germans after World War II, saying the Allies "actually did [an ethnic cleansing]".

=== Support for Kanye West ===
On October 3, 2022, during Adidas Yeezy SZN 9 fashion show in Paris, Owens posed for a photo with Kanye West wearing a matching shirt with the "WHITE LIVES MATTER" slogan. During Paris Fashion Week, West entered negotiations with Owens's husband, the CEO of social networking service Parler, to purchase the website. After West posted tweets declaring he would "go Death Con 3 on Jewish people"; Owens defended West, stating that "if you are an honest person, you did not find this tweet antisemitic". Owens further accused the Anti-Defamation League of instigating antisemitism following the organization's criticism of West and Kyrie Irving. Owens's comments were made before West praised Adolf Hitler in an InfoWars interview. After the interview, Parler announced that West had canceled his plans to buy the website.

Rabbi Shmuley Boteach has repeatedly criticized Owens for her friendship with West. Owens condemned Boteach as a "monster", stating that "any person who defends him or his hag daughter is immediately suspicious." Owens has also claimed that in Hollywood, there is "a small ring of specific people who are using the fact that they are Jewish to shield themselves from any criticism" and that this ring "appears to be something that is quite sinister". In March 2024, Owens liked a tweet asking Boteach if he was "drunk on Christian blood again", an apparent reference to the antisemitic blood libel accusation. The Daily Wire announced they were ending their association with Owens a few days after Owens liked the tweet.

=== Jews and Judaism ===
Following her departure from the Daily Wire after she was accused of antisemitism, Owens downplayed the prevalence of antisemitism, stating that "people who are now screaming 'antisemitism is everywhere!' are actually just racial supremacists." According to Media Matters, Owens criticized Jordan Peterson for calling far-right commentator Nick Fuentes a "psychopathic rat" after Fuentes tweeted that Jews control the Biden administration. Owens suggested that Fuentes could be correct based on the number of Jewish officials appointed to the Biden administration, saying that "it seems a weird tweet for [Peterson] to be so disturbed about." Owens further referred to Fuentes as having "a very long background of focusing his attention on Israel and Zionism, and that's what he is reacting to". Fuentes had previously praised Owens, saying she was waging "a full-fledged war against the Jews". Owens falsely claimed in an interview with Tristan Tate, brother of Andrew Tate, that Joseph Stalin was Jewish, and that Sigmund Freud and Stalinists were part of a Jewish cabal. Owens claimed that Freud studied Kabbalah and promoted pedophilia through psychoanalysis.

In July 2024, Owens suggested that Ashkenazi Jews trace their origin to Khazars and are not related to "biblical Jews". According to her, descendants of Khazars were "so immoral and so corrupt" that they were forced to convert to Judaism by Persians and Russians in the eighth century. However, they did not "meaningfully convert" and "carried on their corruption, carried on their sexual deviancy". She suggested that "their religious teachings tell them to infiltrate everywhere" and "[their] elites are disgusting, despicable people". Owens implied that the war in Ukraine is linked to the Khazars' desire to seek revenge on Russia and Iran. She went on to blame instances of sexual abuse in the Catholic Church on them.

During a live broadcast on August 18, 2024, Owens claimed that Leo Frank, a Jewish businessman who was wrongly convicted of murder and lynched in the US state of Georgia in 1915, had killed Mary Phagan as part of a ritual murder on Passover, again referencing blood libel. Owens further claimed there existed a "Frankish Cult...masquering behind Jews" that engages in pedophilia and incest "as sacramental rites". She stated that there are "tens of thousands of pedophiles [who] hide from justice in Israel". Owens's father-in-law Lord Farmer has publicly repudiated her repeated antisemitic remarks. Owens was disinvited from a Trump campaign fundraiser in the summer of 2024 following criticism from Jewish groups. In June 2024, Owens criticized the Antisemitism Awareness Act that was passed by the United States House of Representatives a month before, which she said violated individuals' First Amendment rights. In September 2024, Owens was temporarily suspended from YouTube for violating YouTube's hate speech policies. One video, which resulted in her suspension, was an interview with Kanye West, during which West claimed that Jewish people control the media.

In 2024, Owens suggested that AIPAC, a pro-Israel lobbying group, was responsible for the assassination of President John F. Kennedy during an interview with left-wing commentator Briahna Joy Gray. There is no evidence that AIPAC had anything to do with the assassination of President Kennedy.

In December 2025, Owens falsely asserted that Jewish individuals, rather than European and American merchants, were principally responsible for the enslavement and subsequent sale of Africans during the transatlantic slave trade. She further claimed that evidence supporting her allegation had been deliberately suppressed by Jews. She followed these assertions by encouraging her audience to read Der Talmudjude ("The Talmudic Jew"), an 1871 polemical text by August Rohling, which has long been discredited for its fabrications and misuse of Jewish scriptures, and has been cited by scholars as a foundational pillar of modern antisemitism. Historians specializing in the slave trade rejected Owen's characterizations as factually inaccurate. Owens has used this false assertion of the involvement of Jews in the transatlantic slave trade to encourage hatred of Jews among African-Americans. During her YouTube show, Owens stated: "Your quarrel is not with white men . . wake up and learn the true history of slavery because that was not exactly a white man sport. OK. Jewish people were the ones that were trading us. Jewish people were in control of the slave trade. . .

Because of Owens' antisemitic statements, she was named "Antisemite of the Year" by StopAntisemitism, a title that she celebratorily accepted on her YouTube channel. Satire website The Babylon Bee has published several articles mocking Owens for her antisemitism. In response, Owens referred to the website as the "Babylonian Talmudic Bee" and accused it of "worshipping Israel".

Owens has stated that the word goy — which appears throughout the Hebrew Bible and is ordinarily translated in English-language Bibles as "nation", referring to groups of Jews and non-Jews — actually means "cow" and that its use is intended to show that non-Jews are cattle who are "meant to be herded and ruled over." The New York Times pointed out that her translation would conflict with traditional Catholic interpretations and would, for example, mean that God's covenant in Chapter 12 of the Book of Genesis meant that Abraham was being promised that "I will make of you a great cow".

=== Israel and Palestine ===
Owens is a critic of Israel and was increasingly critical of the country during the Gaza war. In October 2023, she condemned an Israeli strike on a Christian church in Gaza that resulted in the deaths of Christians, tweeting, "I have been disgusted by the propagandists pretending a Christian church was not bombed. Christians were killed. No Christian should stay silent." She later added, "If you think it's antisemitism to notice that innocent Christians were killed in an IDF bombing, then you need to log off." Clarifying her views in early November, Owens tweeted "No government anywhere has a right to commit a genocide, ever."

Her stance on Israel led to her break with Ben Shapiro, co-founder of The Daily Wire, the website for which Candace Owens then worked, contributing to her departing it in March 2024. Shapiro saw her position as increasingly antisemitic: Owens criticized US support for Israel, saying she did not believe "that American taxpayers should have to pay for Israel's wars or the wars of any other country", but also posted about "political Jews" and a "very small ring of specific people who are using the fact that they are Jewish to shield themselves from any criticism", comments Shapiro described as "absolutely disgraceful".

In 2024, Owens accused Israeli Prime Minister Benjamin Netanyahu of killing children, calling Israel's actions "a holocaust that is being committed on Palestinian children and women".

By the end of 2025, Al Jazeera's Arabic service had noted a shift in Owens' rhetoric regarding the Middle East, where she condemned the attacks on the Al-Aqsa Mosque as well as the occupation of the Gaza Strip, causing her popularity among Arab media outlets and Muslim groups to grow. Political journalist Mohammed Ezzat noted that this was a radical shift for Owens' stance, as in the 2010s she had been embroiled in controversy over comments regarding Muslim immigrants following the European migrant crisis, as well as the attacks on the Christchurch Mosque in 2019.

Later, in early 2026, Owens interviewed Bassem Youssef, an Egyptian-American comedian, about political taboos in the media influenced by the Zionist lobby in the United States to target Muslims. The conversation between Owens and Youssef regarding the foreign policy situation between the United States and the Middle East, as well as their comments on the death of Charlie Kirk, were reported by several Egyptian media outlets, including Al-Masry Al-Youm, one of the largest newspapers in circulation in the North African country.

=== COVID-19 pandemic and vaccination ===
In April 2020, Owens said that COVID-19 deaths were overcounted; health experts said that it was more likely that COVID-19 deaths were undercounted. Regarding a COVID-19 vaccine, she said in June 2020 that "under no circumstances will I be getting any #coronavirus vaccine that becomes available. Ever. No matter what." She also referred to Bill Gates as a "vaccine-criminal", and said that he and the World Health Organization (WHO) used "African & Indian tribal children to experiment w/ non-FDA approved drug vaccines". On August 8, 2021, Owens said in a Facebook post: "I still have not received the COVID-19 vaccine and have not demanded that any of my employees get it either. I am proud that I committed myself to standing firm against the bribery, media propaganda, coercion, celebrity-peer pressure campaign, plus censorship... It is isn't easy to swim against such a polluted current but here I am. I trust my gut much more than trust Dr. Fauci." Also in August, Owens claimed that the Centers for Disease Control and Prevention (CDC) proposed "putting high risk people into camps to 'shield' low risk people from them".

In 2021, Owens attracted media attention when she stated that the United States should "invade Australia", saying that Australia had turned into a tyrannical Nazi-style police state due to its public health precautions against COVID-19. Owens said that the comments were made "in jest" and that they had been misinterpreted by the media. Owens has promoted misinformation about COVID-19 vaccines. In a December 2021 interview, she asked Donald Trump about vaccine mandates, and he explained that he shared her views on mandates but said that "the vaccine is one of the greatest achievements of mankind". He added: "The ones that get very sick and go to the hospital are the ones that don't take the vaccine. But it's still their choice. And if you take the vaccine, you're protected. Look, the results of the vaccine are very good, and if you do get it, it's a very minor form. People aren't dying when they take the vaccine." In December 2022, Owens promoted the anti-vaccine film Died Suddenly.

=== Russia and Ukraine ===
In 2022, after the Russian invasion of Ukraine, Owens promoted a quote by Russian president Vladimir Putin that included the false assertion that the USSR created the modern country of Ukraine. Her views have received support and amplification from the Embassy of Russia, Washington, D.C., particularly following her tweet stating "Russian lives matter". In March 2022, Owens faced criticism from historian Anne Applebaum for claiming that Ukraine "wasn't a thing until 1989" and dismissing the notion of a Russian-led genocide in the country, prompting Applebaum to label Owens as ignorant of history.

In December 2022, Owens faced backlash and fact-checking on social media after making unfounded claims about Ukrainian president Volodymyr Zelenskyy's wife Olena Zelenska, with Twitter users debunking her allegations and highlighting the lack of evidence. In a 2023 interview, Owens said "I'm very much a person who has said from the very beginning, 'Fuck Ukraine', you know, and I stand by that" while discussing her opposition to American military aid to Ukraine. In 2024, Owens inaccurately claimed that Zelenskyy is gay and said she did not want Ukraine to win against Russia, stating that "No amount of media brainwash in the world could ever make me hope that Zelenskyy triumphs over an orthodox Russia. Spiritually, I just know that's wrong. You simply do not support a homosexual actor that is locking up churches and bishops."

In early June 2026 Candace Owens traveled to Russia on a trip Owens claims was for religious tourism purposes however Owens also participated on a panel while in the country at the St. Petersburg International Economic Forum alongside Russian philosopher Aleksandr Dugin, the ideological architect of the 2022 Russian invasion of Ukraine.

== Legal issues ==
=== Kimberly Klacik lawsuit ===
During an Instagram livestream on June 22, 2021, Owens accused former Republican congressional candidate Kimberly Klacik of money laundering, tax fraud, illegal drug use, and misusing campaign funds. Owens also said that Klacik is a "madame" who recruits strippers for a strip club owned by her husband. Owens said she found out about this after talking with a woman who claimed to have worked as a stripper at Klacik's strip club.

Klacik denied the allegations and repeatedly asked for Owens to take down the video, which she refused to do. In July, Klacik filed a lawsuit against Owens seeking $20 million for defamation and claiming that the allegations have resulted in Klacik losing political support from donors, being removed from public events, a book deal cancellation, and harassment of Klacik and her family. In a statement, Jacob S. Frenkel, Klacik's attorney, said: "The defendant chose to use her huge social media platform to attack a respected Baltimore political figure" and that "We are using the proper forum — the power of the courts — to respond." The suit was dismissed with prejudice in December 2022 and Klacik had to pay Owens $115,000.

=== Macron lawsuit ===
On July 23, 2025, French president Emmanuel Macron and his wife, Brigitte Macron, sued Owens and her limited liability company for numerous counts of defamation and false light in Delaware state court because Owens had been publicly claiming, since March 2024, that Brigitte Macron was a biological man named Jean-Michel Trogneux. In an interview with Tucker Carlson published August 1, 2025, Owens said she had received a phone call from President Donald Trump the preceding February, and that he had asked her to stop speaking on the topic.

The Macrons are suing for punitive damages and have claimed that they have suffered "substantial economic damages" such as the loss of business opportunities. "This has become so widespread in the United States that we had to react," Macron said. Owens has told listeners she will "stake her entire professional reputation on this" and "On behalf of the entire world, I will see you in court." On September 18, 2025, the Macrons' lawyer said that they would be providing "photographic evidence" that Brigitte is in fact a woman.

On November 22, 2025, Candace Owens tweeted that she had "credible enough" claims from a French government official that Macron had ordered members of the National Gendarmerie Intervention Group to assassinate her. Owens referenced the Charlie Kirk assassination several times, claiming "this person claims that Charlie Kirk's assassin trained with the French legion 13th brigade", and "To the brave official in France who did this because they were so moved by the evil of Charlie's public execution to risk their own life— May God bless you." Owens said that an Israeli operative was part of the alleged assassination squad. Owens did not provide evidence to verify her claims. In April 2026, US President Donald Trump rejected Owens's statements, and commented that he wanted the Macrons to "win lots of money" from the lawsuit.

=== Other ===
In October 2020, Owens sued Lead Stories and USA Today after they fact-checked Facebook posts she had made downplaying the COVID-19 pandemic, alleging their articles had led to her being unable to obtain advertising revenue from her Facebook page and the termination of a deal with Facebook to advertise her book Blackout. Owens created a website to solicit donations for the lawsuit. The lawsuit was dismissed in July 2021, with the judge ruling that her posts contained COVID-19 misinformation. The lawsuit's dismissal was upheld in February 2022.

In April 2022, a class-action lawsuit was filed in Florida against LGBcoin, a cryptocurrency company, Owens, stock car racing driver Brandon Brown, and NASCAR, alleging that the defendants had made false statements about the LGBcoin and that the founders of the company had engaged in a pump and dump scheme.

== Controversies ==
=== Dispute with family of Mollie Tibbetts ===
In August 2018, Owens had a dispute with Sam Lucas, cousin of Mollie Tibbetts, who had been murdered by Cristhian Bahena Rivera, a 24-year-old Mexican illegal immigrant. Tibbetts's cousin said that Owens had exploited Tibbetts's death for "political propaganda". Owens responded by describing Lucas's criticism as a "strange" attack on Trump supporters. Later that month, the University of Iowa's chapter of Turning Point USA criticized Owens for "public harassment" towards a member of Tibbetts's family, and the executive board members of the chapter all resigned in protest.

=== Promotion of conspiracy theories ===
Owens has been criticized for promoting conspiracy theories, including expressing the belief that the Moon landings did not happen,, calling them "fake and gay". Addressing a 2022 tweet about the Moon landing being "faked", Owens stated on comedian Bill Maher's Club Random podcast that she does not know or care enough about the Moon landing to call it a hoax, stating that she has "never cared about the topic". In 2024, Owens hosted conspiracy theorist Bart Sibrel on her podcast to further promote the theory that the Moon landing was faked. Owens has appeared on fringe conspiracy websites, such as InfoWars. In 2018, she was a guest host on Fox News, and began to distance herself from the far-right conspiracy websites, although she refused to criticize InfoWars or its hosts.

During the October 2018 United States mail bombing attempts targeting prominent Democrats, Owens took to Twitter to promote the conspiracy theory that the mailings were sent by leftists. After authorities arrested a 56-year-old suspect who was a registered Republican and Trump supporter, Owens deleted her tweet without explanation.

In March 2024, Owens endorsed the conspiracy theory that Brigitte Macron, wife of French president Emmanuel Macron, was secretly transgender. Owens stated: "After looking into this, I would stake my entire professional reputation on the fact that Brigitte Macron is in fact a man. Any journalist or publication that is trying to dismiss this plausibility is immediately identifiable as establishment. (...) The implications here are terrifying." In 2025, Owens released a multi-part video miniseries titled Becoming Brigitte, which promoted the conspiracy theory. She also promoted the book by investigative journalist Xavier Poussard, Devenir Brigitte (Becoming Brigitte in its English publication), which became a bestseller on Amazon. Owens further claimed that Brigitte Macron, under a male identity, had been a study participant in the Stanford prison experiment as part of an alleged CIA mind-control program.

=== Mention in shooters' manifestos ===
Brenton Harrison Tarrant, the terrorist who committed the Christchurch mosque shootings, produced a manifesto prior to committing the shootings in which he wrote that Owens had "influenced [him] above all". According to journalist Robert Evans, it was "possible, even likely", that Tarrant was a fan of Owens, considering her rhetoric against Muslim immigrants but that, in context, his references to her may have been an example of "shitposting" intended to provoke political conflict. For instance, the line "Though I will have to disavow some of [Owens's] beliefs, the extreme actions she calls for are too much, even for my tastes" was assessed by The Root as trolling.

Hours after the shootings, Owens posted a tweet in reaction to allegations that she inspired the mass murder, saying that she never created any content espousing her views on the Second Amendment to the United States Constitution or Islam. Her tweet was criticized as "glib" when it was reported that she actually had posted tweets about the Second Amendment and Islam. She later made formal statements rejecting any connection to the terrorist.

Solomon Henderson, a student who was identified by law enforcement as being responsible for a school shooting at Antioch High School in Nashville, cited Candace Owens and Nick Fuentes as inspirations. In a manifesto published online, Henderson wrote "Candace Owens has influenced me above all each time she spoke I was stunned by her insights and her own views helped push me further and further into the belief of violence over the Jewish question."

=== Planned 2024 Australasian tour ===
In late August 2024, Owens announced plans for a speaking tour of five Australian cities and the New Zealand city of Auckland in November 2024. In response, local Jewish groups including the Zionist Federation of Australia, the Anti-Defamation Commission, Dayenu, and the Holocaust Centre called for the Australian and New Zealand governments to deny Owens entry due to her anti-Semitic views and remarks. Annetta Able, who survived Mengele's experiments, said that Owens's denial of Nazi medical experiments "is not just deeply offensive, it is a dangerous distortion of historical truth that I witnessed with my own eyes." Similar calls were echoed by Australian Coalition immigration spokesperson Dan Tehan, who called upon Home Affairs Minister Tony Burke to block Owens's visa application on character grounds. New Zealand Acting Race Relations Commissioner Saunoamaali'i Dr Karanina Sumeo criticised Owens's Holocaust denial and said that "freedom of expression must be balanced against people's right to be free from discrimination, the right to safety and security, and the right to religious freedom and belief." By contrast, Juliet Moses of the New Zealand Jewish Council disagreed with calls to ban Owens's entry, citing free speech. Immigration New Zealand said that Owens's visa application would be subject to a character test. During an interview with Sydney radio station 2GB, Owens confirmed that she would not be canceling her travel plans to Australia, saying that her husband had cousins there.

On October 27, 2024, Australia's Immigration Minister Tony Burke said Owens's visa had been canceled based on her "capacity to incite discord", stating "From downplaying the impact of the Holocaust with comments about Mengele through to claims that Muslims started slavery, Candace Owens has the capacity to incite discord in almost every direction...." On October 14, 2025, she lost her High Court challenge over the Australian Government's decision to deny her entry to Australia. In a unanimous decision, the judges ruled that "Australia's freedoms applied to Australian citizens and residents. (Ms Owens) has never been a member of the 'people' of Australia... It simply does not apply to her".

In November 2024, Owens was barred from entering New Zealand after her entertainer's work permit was refused, with the cited reason being that visas could not be granted to those excluded from another country. However, on December 12, following a request by Owens for Ministerial Intervention, New Zealand's Associate Immigration Minister Chris Penk reversed Immigration New Zealand's decision to deny her a work visa. It was later reported that the advocacy group Free Speech Union had lobbied Penks into reversing Immigration New Zealand's decision to bar Owens entry into New Zealand.

=== Charlie Kirk assassination ===
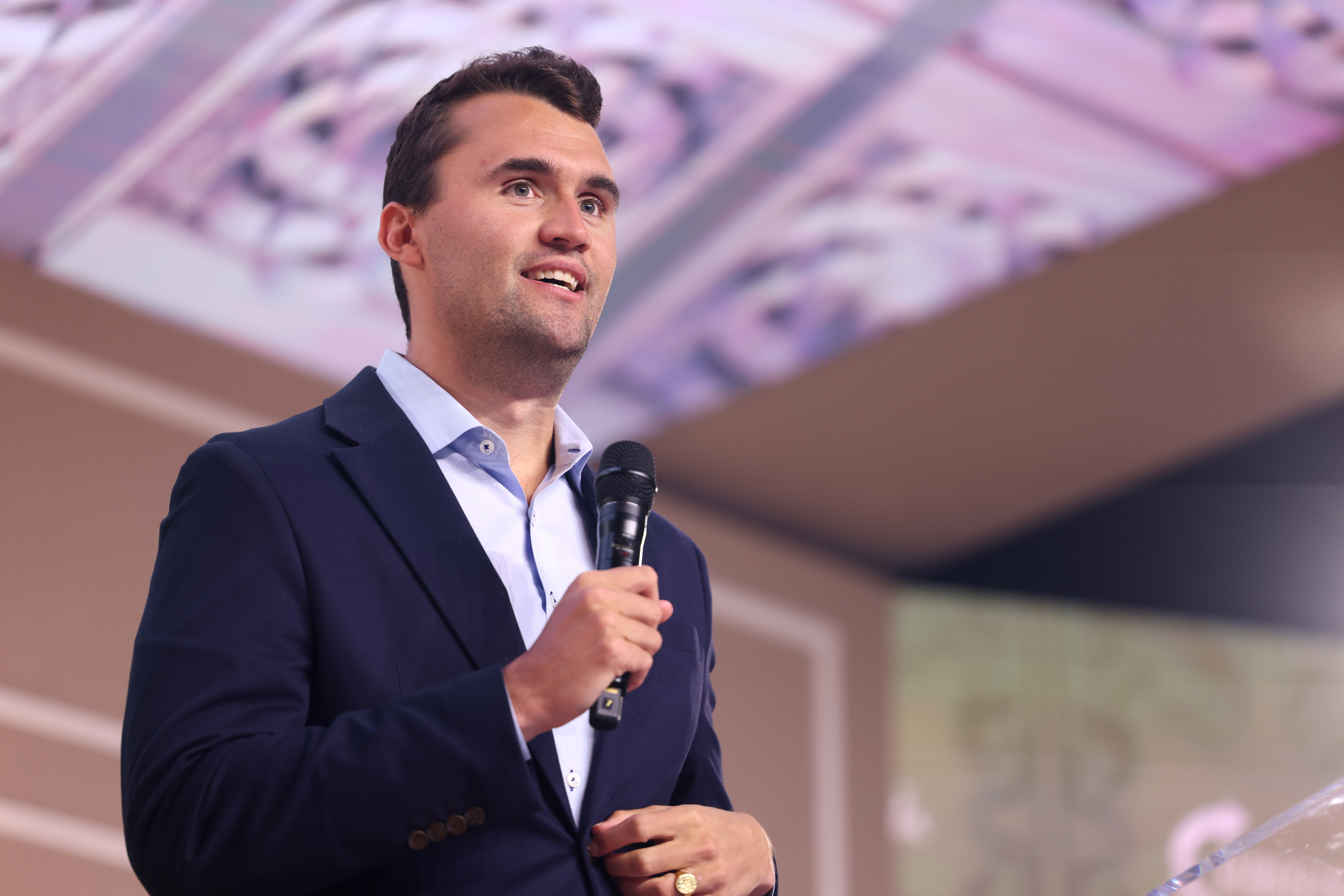
Charlie Kirk speaking with attendees at the 2025 Young Women's Leadership Summit at the Gaylord Texan Resort & Convention Center in Grapevine, Texas

Following the September 2025 assassination of Charlie Kirk in Utah, Owens questioned aspects of the investigation on her podcast, suggesting that Tyler Robinson did not act alone in killing Kirk. Owens initially suggested, without evidence, that Utah politician Phil Lyman, who was attending the event at which Kirk was assassinated, was connected to a conspiracy to kill Kirk. This accusation was denounced by Governor of Utah Spencer Cox, Lyman's former opponent.

Owens has implied, without explicitly stating, that an Israeli conspiracy was responsible for Kirk's death. Several organizations and media outlets criticized Owens's comments as promoting antisemitic conspiracy theories, while her supporters defended her right to raise questions. Owens released several private text messages from Kirk, showing that Kirk, a vocal supporter of Israel, had in private showed more ambivalence towards Israel and Zionist activists. These include, most notably, texts from a WhatsApp group chat where Kirk, around 48 hours before his death, revealed to coworkers he had "no choice but to leave the pro-Israel cause".

Owens has also accused the Egyptian and French governments of playing a part in the assassination, inaccurately claiming that Egyptian airplanes were stalking Erika Kirk. Owens claimed to have had a dream in which Charlie Kirk told her he had been betrayed. Owens claimed the dream was an example of her "prophetic vision" and "female intuition" that would lead her to the truth about Kirk.

During an interview with Elle Reeve, Owens inaccurately claimed that messages written by Robinson that were released to the public were Discord messages, when they were in fact text messages. Owens claimed these messages were fabricated by the federal government, while admitting she had not read the federal indictment of Robinson. Owens would further suggest that unspecified members of Turning Point USA were complicit in Kirk's assassination.

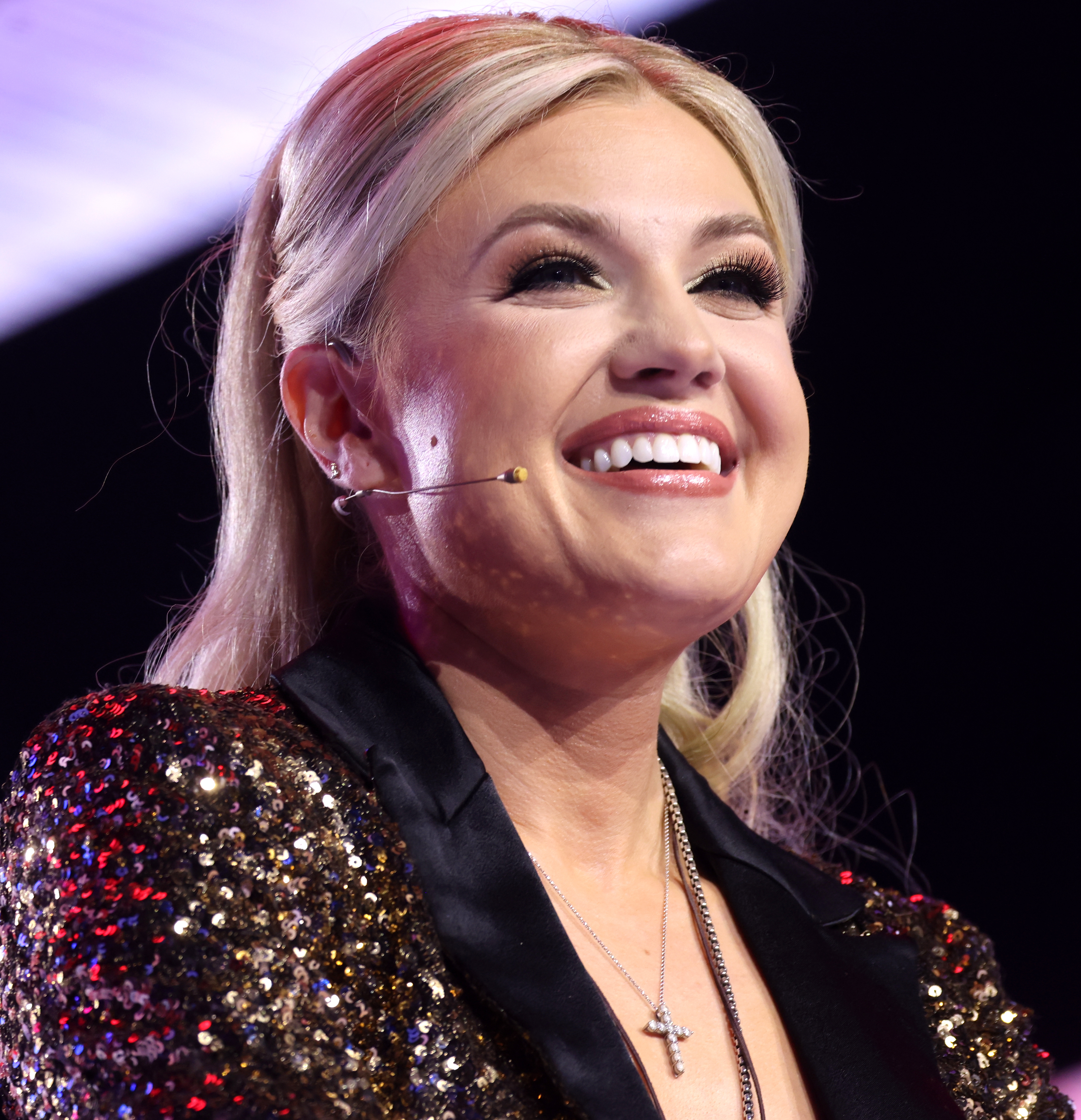
Erika Kirk speaking with attendees at the 2025 AmericaFest at the Phoenix Convention Center in Phoenix, Arizona

In an interview with CBS, Erika Kirk, the widow of Charlie Kirk, condemned conspiracy theories regarding her husband's death as a "mind virus". She reported that conspiracy theorists who believed she was complicit in the assassination had sent death threats to her and Turning Point USA staff members. Kirk told Owens "Stop. That's it. That's all I have to say. Stop." In December 2025, Owens agreed to speak with Kirk in a meeting arranged by Megyn Kelly. Owens and Kirk spoke for four and a half hours in what Kirk called a "very productive conversation". However, Owens later said she still believed Tyler Robinson was not the assassin, declaring "I did not recant" her prior allegations against Turning Point USA.

On January 27, 2026, Owens released alleged leaked audio on her podcast of a Turning Point USA meeting involving Erika Kirk and employees. During the audio, she is heard calling Charlie's memorial "the event of the century", discussing merch sales, and encouraging employees to continue the work but grieve as needed. Owens responds to the clip stating, "It is the general tone that is off-putting. It's the laughter that is off-putting. We are not even weeks after watching your husband be assassinated. We're talking about numbers and metrics that have been hit." She released a video call the following day, January 28, where Erika claimed their team is "family" and reassured them of their job security.

In February 2026, Owens released a series titled Bride of Charlie, a "serialized takedown" of Erika Kirk and her family members that insinuated their involvement with sex trafficking, the occult, and "MKUltra-adjacent" figures.

In an August 2026 debate with Andrew Wilson, Owens confirmed she had no direct proof to support her claims of Israeli involvement in the assassination.

== Personal life ==
Owens met British entrepreneur and media personality George Farmer, the son of Lord Farmer, in December 2018 at the launch event for Turning Point UK, a conservative student organization. The two became engaged in 2019 and were married in August that year at the Trump Winery in Charlottesville, Virginia. Guests at the ceremony included Larry Elder and Charlie Kirk.

Owens gave birth to a boy in January 2021, a girl in July 2022, and two more boys in late 2023 and May 2025, respectively. On June 22, 2026, Owens announced she is expecting her fifth child.

In April 2024, Owens converted to Catholicism, the denomination of her husband, himself an adult convert. She previously identified as a Reformed Evangelical Protestant.

== Bibliography ==
- Owens, Candace (2020). Blackout: How Black America Can Make Its Second Escape from the Democrat Plantation. New York: Threshold Editions. ISBN 978-1-9821-3327-6.
- Owens, Candace (2025). Make Him A Sandwich: Why Real Women Don't Need Fake Feminism. Platform Press. ISBN 9781635826128.

== Filmography ==
- The Greatest Lie Ever Sold (documentary, 2022)
- A Shot in the Dark (documentary, 2023)
- Convicting a Murderer (documentary, 2023)
- Lady Ballers (2023)
- Surrounded (2025)
- In Whose Name? (2025)
