= Andrew Wilson (internet personality) =

American Christian and conservative online debater (born 1984)

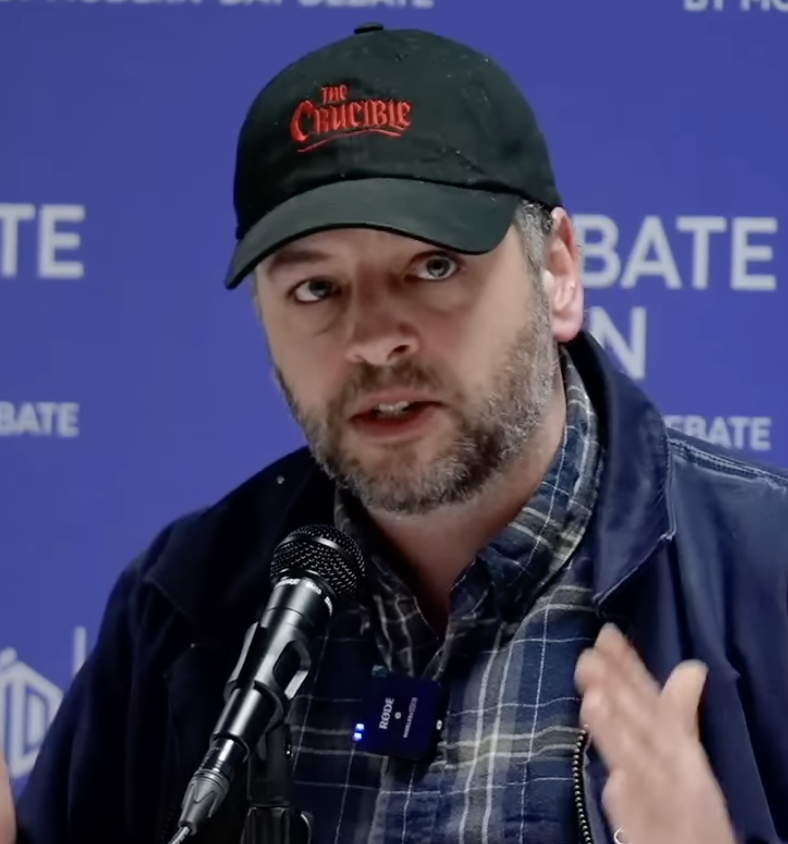
- Wilson debating in favor of Christian ethics against secular humanism in 2025
- Born: January 23, 1984 (age 42); California, U.S.
- Occupations: Debater; political commentator; streamer
- Movement: Conservatism
- Spouse: Rachel Wilson

X information
- Handle: @paleochristcon
- Display name: Andrew Wilson
- Years active: 2021–present
- Followers: 212,900

YouTube information
- Channel: The Crucible
- Years active: 2021–present
- Subscribers: 380,000
- Views: 46,987,000
- Last updated: August 19, 2026
- Website: https://thecrucible.video/

Andrew Wilson (born January 23, 1984) is an American Christian nationalist and conservative online debater, political commentator, and streamer. He is known for hosting the debate platform The Crucible and Debate University, the latter of which offers courses on debating.

== Background ==
Wilson was born on January 23, 1984 in California, and he converted to Christianity after a rebellious stage as a teenager. He has stated he previously served in the U.S. military.

== Debate and commentary ==
Wilson has been described as a conservative and as a Christian, and has labeled himself a paleoconservative and a Christian nationalist. Wilson is an Orthodox Christian and has been identified as an "orthobro" influencer, who has been critical of non-Orthodox Christian sects. He holds a negative view of feminism, stating that it is undermining Western civilization, and deems the immigration of Muslims as a threat to the United States and the result of suicidal empathy.

Wilson is best known for hosting The Crucible, which is a debate program and show where Wilson has been noted for debating leftists, some of which have gone viral. Wilson is also a collaborator with many manosphere influencers, including the Whatever podcast and Myron Gaines, but he rejects being labeled a manosphere influencer himself. He has participated in several debates on the platform Modern-Day Debates, where he has debated various topics, including religion and politics. In a Modern-Day Debates debate over secular humanism, Wilson's debate opponent, atheist Matt Dillahunty, left the debate after Wilson's opening statement, a move that received criticism from Roman Catholic apologist Trent Horn and C. Douglas Golden with The Western Journal.

Wilson runs Debate University, which offers debate courses taught by himself and two other Christian debaters, David Patrick Henry and Chase Haggard. Politico described the course as "an online seminar for debate bros, by debate bros" and that, while not explicitly political, is targeted towards those who lean conservative. The seminar is noted for emphasizing an aggressive approach to debate, with Wilson likening debate as a substitute for physical combat for men in the modern era. The seminar also teaches classical debate structure, promotes developing a thick-skin, and underscores particular weaknesses they ascribe to many leftist debaters.

In August 2026, Wilson participated in a highly-publicized debate with Candace Owens on conspiracy theories surrounding the assassination of Charlie Kirk. The debate was moderated by Patrick Bet-David and garnered at least 7.2 million views across the various outlets it was streamed on, as of August 17, 2026. Channels airing the debate included prominent right-wing personalities, like Steven Crowder, Tim Pool, and Brandon Tatum, as well as manosphere influencers Myron Gaines and the Whatever podcast. Wilson had reportedly offered Owens $300,000 if she could publicly defend her claims of Israeli-involvement in Kirk's assassination, and Owens later raised the ante to $500,000. Will Sommer of The Bulwark wrote, "Wilson is effectively paying Owens to collaborate with him and boost his profile in the MAGA movement, like an unknown rapper paying a star for a guest verse on his track". It has been variously reported that Owens was unable to provide direct proof that Israel is implicated in Kirk's assassination. Robby Soave wrote in an opinion piece in The Hill that "Wilson destroyed and humiliated Owens, who proved she has no idea what she's talking about".

== Personal life ==
Wilson is married to Rachel Wilson, who is a convert to Orthodoxy and has appeared on the Whatever podcast and The Joe Rogan Experience.
