= Blexit =

American political campaign movement

Blexit (/ˈblɛksɪt/ or /ˈblɛɡzɪt/) is a Minneapolis-based grassroots non-profit movement founded in 2016 after the police killing of Philando Castile. It offers support to African Americans through economic activism and black-owned institutions. The name Blexit is a portmanteau of "black" and "exit" fashioned after Brexit and was coined by Me'Lea Connelly in 2016.

In 2018, Candace Owens co-opted the term for a social media campaign urging African Americans to leave the Democratic Party. She set up the BLEXIT Foundation which merged with Turning Point USA in 2023.

== Background ==
Minneapolis-based Blexit was a grassroots movement formed in 2016 as the product of community meetings after the police killing of Philando Castile in St. Paul. The term is a portmanteau of "black" and "exit" and was coined by Me'Lea Connelly similar to Brexit, the term used by the campaign to withdraw the United Kingdom from the European Union. Blexit is a movement towards black economic independence by encouraging African-Americans to leave traditional financial systems which were perceived to have taken advantage of the black community.

In October 2018, Candace Owens appropriated the Blexit name, which wasn't trademarked, for the "Blexit" social media campaign she launched at Turning Point USA's Young Black Leadership Summit in Washington, D.C. The campaign urged African Americans to leave the Democratic Party. It initially received mainstream coverage because it claimed that rapper Kanye West had designed the logo and merchandise for it. He denied the claim and any involvement in the campaign. In 2023, Blexit Foundation Inc., which is set up as a tax-exempt 501(c)(3) nonprofit organization, and Turning Point USA announced that the organizations were merging.

== See also ==
- Blaxit
