= Andrew Wilson (ballet dancer) =

Irish ballet dancer, teacher and choreographer

- Born: Dublin, Ireland
- Education: Bird College of Dance, Royal Ballet School
- Occupations: Ballet dancer, teacher, and choreographer
- Years active: 1980? - present
- Career
- Current group: Bird Ballet Company
- Former groups: Birmingham Royal Ballet

Andrew Wilson is an Irish ballet dancer, ballet teacher, choreographer and academic administrator from Dublin, Ireland. The second of three Irish male students of the Royal Ballet School, he is a former Soloist of the Birmingham Royal Ballet. As of 2022, he is Head of Ballet and Contemporary Dance at Bird College, London, where he has taught since 2000.

== Studies and career ==
Born and brought up in Dublin, Wilson trained with Jill Wigham in Dublin, then at Bird College (Conservatoire for Dance and Musical Theatre) in Sidcup, London, graduating in 1983. During this period, he also appeared in the film short Shoes by Peter Finnegan, entered in the Cannes Film Festival of 1981.

Wilson obtained a place for further study at the Royal Ballet School (RBS), only the second male student from Ireland to do so, following Kilian O'Callaghan in 1980. He applied for and received support from the Arts Council of Ireland, and the Gulbenkian Foundation, and also won the Harvey Theatre Scholarship in 1983 to support these studies. At the RBS, he won the Cyril Beaumont Bursary, and was also selected by Artistic Director Merle Park to represent the school at the 1984 Prix de Lausanne competition.

He secured a post at the touring sister company of The Royal Ballet, the Sadler's Wells Royal Ballet, where he was promoted to Corphyee in 1989. He was promoted further, to Soloist, in 1991, at what had become the Birmingham Royal Ballet. Roles taken included leading positions in The Nutcracker, Giselle, Elite Syncopations and Danses Concertantes by MacMillan, and works by Ashton, Bintley, de Valois, Massine and de Mille. He also performed in the Royal Variety Show, and in the Children's Royal Variety Show with Kylie Minogue, and with the Dublin Grand Opera Society.

On stepping back from full-time dancing Wilson pursued the Professional Dancers' Teaching Course at the Royal Academy of Dance, securing a distinction, and became Head of Boys Ballet at Elmhurst Ballet School during 1995.

In 2000, he was appointed to a position at his alma mater, Bird College, and was promoted to Head of Ballet in 2006. As of 2022, he is Head of Ballet and Contemporary Dance and a member of the college's nine-member management group, and is responsible for the teaching of pas de deux to all years. He also works with the Bird Theatre Company as manager and resident choreographer, and has taken the company on tours around the UK, Europe and parts of Asia and Oceania. He supports choreography for Bird College musical theatre productions.

Wilson also guest teaches at ballet companies and schools in Dublin, Rotterdam and Budapest, and for the Royal Academy of Dance and the Imperial Society of Teachers of Dancing (ISTD), with both of which he is a registered teacher, and for the ISTD, curriculum designer and examiner. He is also the patron of the Cork Youth Ballet, and of the Castleknock School of Dance and Isabelle Ashe Theatre Arts, both in Dublin. Wilson has also coached and judged on a television show "Pump up my Dance" for the Irish State broadcaster, RTÉ, selecting potential corps de ballet members.

== Ballet companies ==
Ballet Company	Years active	Country	Role
Bird Theatre Company	2000–present	London, U.K.	Manager, choreographer
Birmingham Royal Ballet	1984-1995	West Midlands, U.K.	Coryphee, then Soloist
Royal Ballet School	1983-1984	London, U.K.	Student dancer
Bird College	1981-1983	London, U.K.	Student dancer
