= Peppermint Park (TV series) =

American direct-to-video children's series

Peppermint Park is a direct-to-video children's show consisting of six volumes, released in 1987 and 1988 on VHS. The show is a mixture of live action, animation, and puppets. Characters included Ernie (not the one from Sesame Street), who sang a song about the letter M; Snorkee, a dragon who is often messing with time; Maynard, an elderly man who loves blue, blue cheese, and laments over his wasted youth; Prof. Goodstuff, a Yoda lookalike scientist who acts like Dr. Bunsen Honeydew, Shirley U'Jest, an African-American woman who loves red, and Piggle, a pig with a big Cookie Monster-like appetite whose voice was similar to that of Kermit the Frog (voiced like Lazy Smurf in volumes 2-6), among others. Many of the show's elements seem to have been copied from Sesame Street. The show was filmed in Los Angeles, CA.

== Production and release ==
The series was directed and produced by John Horton and Mark V International and released by Televidics Productions. Most of the puppets were created by Dann O'Quinn, but volumes four through six also featured puppets created by Dave Chapman. Human characters included "The Story Lady" (played by Melody Knighton, who also assisted in the operations of some of the puppets) and "Magic Megan" (played by Deanna Hawkins). Additionally, animated segments were done by "Those Designers", Inc., and the music was composed by Tuesday Productions and John Horton. Most likely due to very poor sales, budget problems, and/or negative reviews, the series was canceled sometime in 1988 and both Mark V International and Televidics Productions went out of business. By this point, the six volumes had already gone out of print. For at least 1990 and 1991, it was distributed to Low-Power TV stations by Enoki Films USA.

== Episodes ==
- "Magic Moments" (March 2, 1987)
- "The Story Lady" (September 28, 1987)
- "Music Land" (January 18, 1988)
- "Musical Letters" (April 18, 1988)
- "Carnival Fun" (September 12, 1988)
- "Discover Feelings" (November 28, 1988)

== Reception and inspiration ==
Nick Antosca, creator and showrunner of SyFy's series Channel Zero, turned to Peppermint Park and other "really creepy old children's TV shows" as inspiration for the puppet show in season one of his series Candle Cove (2016).

American artist Andrew Norman Wilson remembered as a kid "being terrified of an unexplained dance sequence by a breakaway puppet dressed to look like a scarecrow." But rewatching clips posted online a few years ago he said, "my relationship with the dancing scarecrow has shifted from horror to obsession." He created Reality Models, an extended remake of that scene for a 2016 exhibit.

Screen Rant included the series in a 2017 list of forgotten creepy kid's shows. They suggested it is the "uncanny valley" and "melancholy voice acting" which makes the episodes "unnerving".

In 2019, Cracked.com included the series in a list of nightmarish children's characters. The Found Footage Festival's "VCR Party Live!" channel also mentioned the "uncanny valley" and included a clip from the series with a puppet singing about the letter M.
