= Andy Wilson (English footballer) =

English footballer

Personal information
- Full name: Andrew Wilson
- Date of birth: 27 September 1940 (age 86)
- Place of birth: Rotherham, England
- Position: Winger

Senior career*
Years	Team	Apps	(Gls)
1959–1961	Sheffield United	4	(0)
1961–1965	Scunthorpe United	112	(14)
1965–1966	Doncaster Rovers	21	(0)
1966–1968	Chesterfield	72	(13)
1968–1969	Aldershot	20	(1)
1969–1970	Boston United	25	(7)
- * Club domestic league appearances and goals

Andrew Wilson (born 27 September 1940) is an English former professional footballer who scored 28 goals from 229 matches in the Football League. A winger, he played for Sheffield United, Scunthorpe United, Doncaster Rovers, Chesterfield and Aldershot.

== Career ==
Wilson was born in Rotherham, Yorkshire. He began his career in the Football League with Sheffield United, joining Scunthorpe United of the Fourth Division in June 1961. He stayed with the club for four seasons, and played more than 100 games, before moving to Doncaster Rovers in 1965 on a free transfer. After a year he moved on to Chesterfield, and after a further two years signed for Aldershot. In 1969, he dropped into non-League football with Boston United.
