= Brandon Tatum =

American political commentator (born 1987)

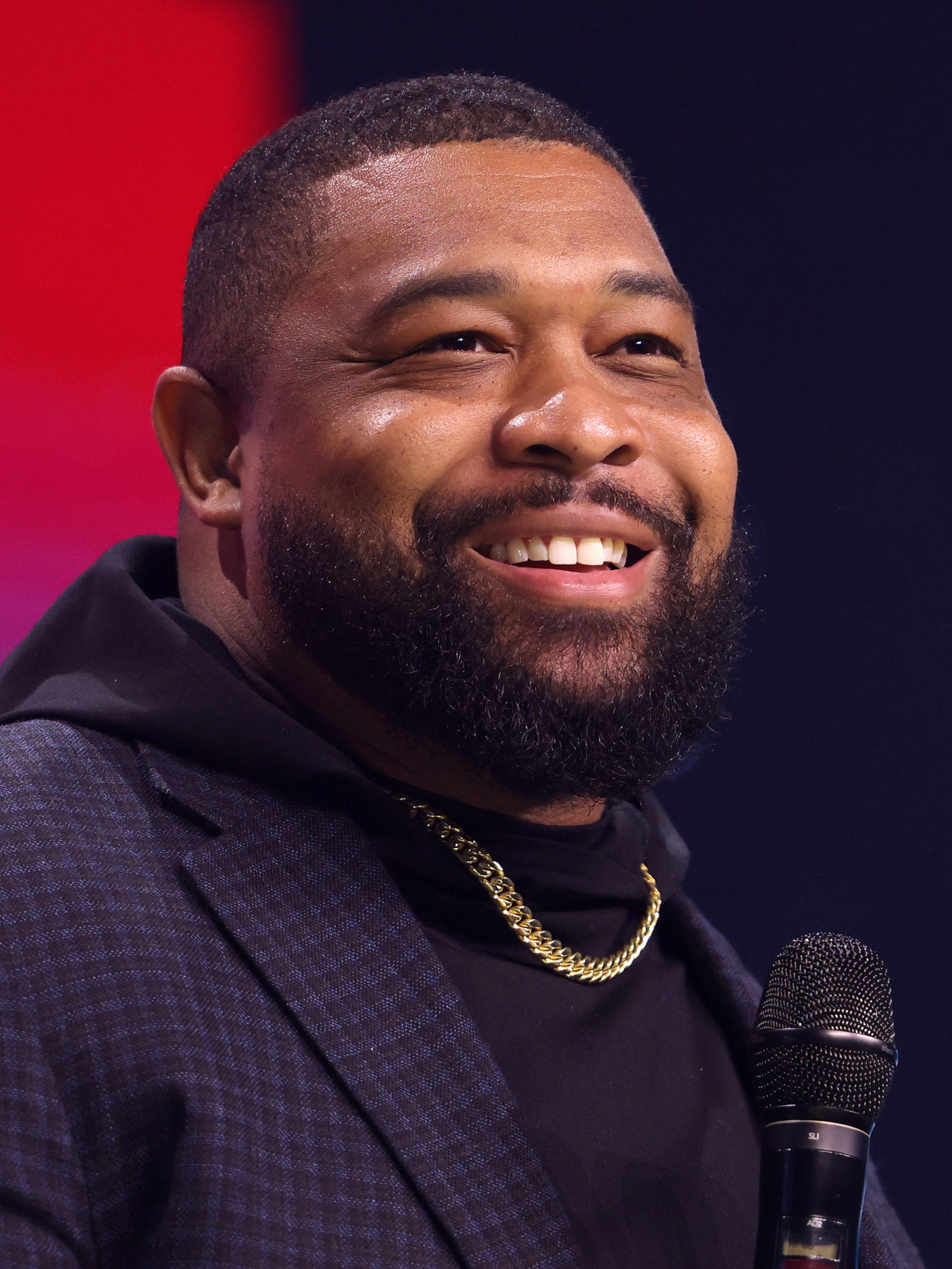
- Tatum in 2025
- Born: Brandon Orlando Tatum; April 22, 1987 (age 39); Fort Worth, Texas, U.S.
- Other name: The Officer Tatum
- Education: University of Arizona (BA)
- Occupations: YouTuber; political commentator; author; radio host; podcaster
- Height: 6 ft 1 in (185 cm)
- Political party: Republican
- Movement: Black conservative movement
- Spouse: Corinne Tatum
- Children: 2

YouTube information
- Channel: The Officer Tatum
- Years active: 2012–present
- Genres: Culture and politics
- Subscribers: 3.71 million
- Views: 2 billion
- Last updated: April 23, 2026
- Website: theofficertatum.com

Brandon Orlando Tatum (born April 22, 1987), also known as The Officer Tatum, is an American YouTuber, conservative political commentator, author, radio personality, former policeman, and former college football player.

== Early life and education ==
Born in Fort Worth, Texas, Tatum was an All-American football player at Dunbar High School. His father, Bobby Tatum, was a Deputy Chief in the Fort Worth Fire Department. His great uncle, Jack Tatum, was an Ohio State All-American, NFL All-Pro, Tatum was featured in the US-Army All-American Game, which showcases the top 78 high school football players in the nation. Tatum committed to playing on a full athletic scholarship from the University of Arizona in 2004. Tatum played at Arizona for five years and entered the NFL draft in 2010.

Pre-draft measurables
Height	Weight	40-yard dash	10-yard split	20-yard split	20-yard shuttle	Three-cone drill	Vertical jump	Broad jump	Bench press
6 ft 1 3/8 in (1.86 m)	204 lb (93 kg)	4.59 s	1.59 s	2.66 s	4.31 s	7.08 s	38.5 in (0.98 m)	11 ft 2 in (3.40 m)	21 reps
All values from Arizona's Pro Day

== Career ==
=== Police officer ===
After going undrafted in the NFL draft, Tatum became a police officer in Tucson, Arizona. He rose to prominence in early 2016 for a viral video which featured him at a campaign rally for presidential candidate Donald Trump. Following the rally, he said in the video that he felt unsafe because of those who protested against the event. He went viral a second time in September 2017 for a video in which he expressed his opposition to players "taking the knee" during the national anthem at NFL football games.

=== Political commentary ===
Tatum resigned from the Tucson Police Department in October 2017 to join Liftable Media — a conservative content producer that owns and operates The Western Journal and The Conservative Tribune. He then served as director of urban engagement for the conservative action group Turning Point USA, before founding his own media company in late 2019.

In November 2021, Bombardier Books published Tatum's book, Beaten Black and Blue: Being a Black Cop in an America Under Siege, distributed by Simon & Schuster.

In May 2022, Tatum began hosting a national talk radio program, The Officer Tatum Show, distributed by Salem Radio Network.

Tatum runs a YouTube channel called "The Officer Tatum" with over 3 million subscribers. As of May 2023, he has accumulated over 571 million total views.

On October 2, 2026, as a guest on the Lunatics and Legends Podcast, Jeff Tretta (a sound engineer) reported that Tatum unexpectedly fired the entire team of The Officer Tatum show on Christmas Day, 2025. Tretta stated that Tatum "is not a good person".

Tatum has also appeared as a guest on Candace Owens's PragerU show The Candace Owens Show and her The Daily Wire political podcast Candace as a panelist.

Tatum is an outspoken supporter of Israel and The Jerusalem Post named him as one of the Top 10 Pro-Israel Christians in 2025.

On Sep 4, 2025, Tatum uploaded a video to YouTube with the Prime Minister of Israel, Benjamin Netanyahu, where they discussed whether Christians were safe within Israel, the church bombings in Gaza, the accusations of War Crimes toward Israel, etc. When discussing Christian safety, Tatum told Netanyahu that he could "attest to that, as a Christian, in Israel I spent two weeks there with the Church, and we had an incredible time, we had only once incident where a small child spit on one of the pastors, and immediately after there was an adult that came by and said "That's not a representation of who we are, we love you guys, you guys are always welcome here." And I have to say no adults gave us grief, we had no issues whatsoever, in our experience there, it was actually an amazing experience."

=== Blexit ===
Along with Owens, Tatum founded Blexit, an organization meant to persuade the black American population to leave the Democratic Party and re-register as Republicans. The name Blexit is a portmanteau, a combination of the words "black" and "exit".

== Bibliography ==
- Beaten Black and Blue, published November 30, 2021 (ISBN 1642938513)
