= Peppermint Park, Texas =

Former American amusement park

Peppermint Park (also called "Peppermint Park Kiddieland") was an amusement park in Houston, Texas, United States, which opened in the late 1950s. It first started out in the parking lot of Sears in Pasadena, Texas and was co-founded by Bill Watson in 1956. He then moved Peppermint Park to the Gulf Freeway with a roofed structure so that he could open when it rained. Watson sold the property at Gulf Freeway and purchased the Interstate 610 property to build an indoor facility so he could open it year round.

In 1979, Bobby and JoAnn Watkins purchased Peppermint Park and moved it to Highway 59 and what would become Beltway 8, painting the building a candy striped red and white. In 1981, Mr. and Mrs. Watkins started Party On Wheels, basically a traveling amusement park for private parties, charity events and school functions. Party On Wheels was discontinued in 1987. Mr. Watkins died in 1984 and it became too much to handle for Mrs. Watkins. Peppermint Park sold and closed in 1989.

Jeffrey "Jeff" Love purchased Peppermint Park and moved it to Friendswood, Texas, against the advice of Mrs. Watkins, who said "Friendswood would come to Houston but Houston would not go to Friendswood." He made it considerably smaller and raised the prices, also against the advice of Mrs. Watkins. She was right. It was never successful and closed shortly thereafter. Mrs. Watkins learned, to her dismay, that Jeff Love had mortgaged all of her equipment and rides and she was unable to repossess them.

When the original location closed, the contents of the business were divided and sold. Jeff Love purchased ten of the higher quality rides, including Merry Go Round, Boat Ride, Airplane Ride, The Whip, Bounce Houses, and Ball Pit. He created a fully indoor version of Peppermint Park from 1986 to 1994 in Friendswood. This incarnation of the business was located off of FM 528 in an old grocery store that was turned into a candy-striped interior filled with fun. In addition to the ten rides, the walls were lined with coin-operated rides, a long section dedicated as a party room, and the back wall was a snack counter that included the typical amusement park fare: cotton candy, hot dogs, snow cones, nachos, and popcorn. On Saturday, September 24, 1988, the park threw its 30th birthday party as a reunion for its birthday-party alumni, encouraging them to bring photos of their parties.

== Attractions ==
List of attractions and rides throughout the park's history.

- Merry-go-round imported from Italy
- Kiddie automobile track
- The Whip
- "Helicopter" ride
- Mini boats
- Carnival games
- Live pony rides (in reality, they were miniature horses)
- Birthday party rooms
- "See-saw" human-powered ride that rode on a narrow train track

== Locations ==
| Date opened | Location | Comments |
| 1958 | Sears Parking Lot, Pasadena, TX | |
| 1963 or earlier | Gulf Freeway, near Gulfgate | Roofed |
| 1972 or earlier | 2701 North Loop West, Houston, TX (Interstate 610) | Indoor |
| 1979 | Highway 59 (Beltway 8) | |
| 1986 | 17164 Blackhawk Blvd, Friendswood, TX | |
