= Norm Wilson (footballer) =

Australian rules footballer

Personal information
- Full name: Norm Wilson
- Born: 4 February 1927
- Died: 14 September 2011 (aged 84)
- Original team: Cheltenham

Playing career^{1}
Years	Club	Games (Goals)
1945–46	Melbourne	10 (13)
- ^{1} Playing statistics correct to the end of 1946.

Norm Wilson (4 February 1927 – 14 September 2011) was an Australian rules footballer who played with Melbourne in the Victorian Football League (VFL).
