= Andrew Wilson (traveller) =

Scottish traveller and author (1831–1881)

Andrew Wilson (1831–1881) was a Scottish traveller and author.

== Life ==
He was the eldest son of the missionary John Wilson. He was educated at the universities of Edinburgh and Tübingen, and afterwards lived for some time in Italy. He then went to India, where he began his career as a journalist by taking charge of the Bombay Times in the absence of George Buist, and as an oriental traveller by a tour in Baluchistan.

After his return to England he contributed to Blackwood's Magazine some verses entitled ‘Wayside Songs’; he maintained his connection with ‘Blackwood’ throughout his life. Returning in 1860 to the east, he edited for three years the China Mail, accompanied the expedition to Tianjin after the Second Opium War, and visited Japan. In 1860 he issued at Hong Kong a pamphlet entitled ‘England's Policy in China,’ in which he advocated the change of policy afterwards carried out by Sir Frederick William Adolphus Bruce, Robert Hart, and General Gordon. He travelled in southern China, and sent descriptive contributions to the Daily News and Pall Mall Gazette on Asian questions, as well as to ‘Blackwood.’

At the beginning of the American Civil War he paid a visit to the United States, and afterwards passed some years in England, during which he wrote for papers and magazines. Returning to India about 1873, he edited for a time the Times of India and the Bombay Gazette. Ill-health delayed the publication till 1878 of his book ‘The Ever-Victorious Army: a History of the Chinese Campaigns under Lieutenant-colonel C. G. Gordon, C.B., R.E., and of the Suppression of the Tai-Ping Rebellion,’ an account of the suppression of the movement of 1863–4. Wilson's chief source of information was Gordon's Private Journal then unpublished.

In 1875 Wilson published travel writing under the title ‘The Abode of Snow: Observations on a Journey from Chinese Tibet to the Indian Caucasus through the Upper Valleys of the Himalaya.’ The book is based on articles in Blackwood's Magazine. A second edition was issued next year. Before his final departure from India Wilson made an excursion into the state of Kathiawar. His last contribution to ‘Blackwood’, written in the spring of 1877, was a retrospect of African travel (‘Twenty Years of African Travel’).

The last years of his life were passed in England in the Lake district. He died at Howton on Ullswater on 9 June 1881.
