= King's Church London =

Church in London Borough of Lewisham, UK

Coordinates: 51.4402°N 0.0314°W

- King's Church London
- Address: 21 Meadowcourt Road, London, SE3 9DU
- Country: England
- Denomination: Evangelical Christianity
- Website: www.kingschurchlondon.org

History
- Founded: 1985
- Founder(s): Catford Hill Baptist Church, Allerford Pentecostal Church

King's Church London is an evangelical church based in Kings Church at Catford in London. The church was formed from the merger of Catford Hill Baptist Church and Allerford Chapel in 1985.

King's is part of Newfrontiers, an international group of churches. The church runs a project to support homeless people.
