= Helena Perez Garcia =

Spanish illustrator

Helena Perez Garcia is a Spanish illustrator whose work has appeared in newspapers, magazines, and books for both adults and children. Her clients have included Penguin Random House, BuzzFeed, BBC, and Reader’s Digest.

Born 1987 in Seville, Spain, she relocated to London in 2012, and returned to Spain in 2018.

She has a degree in fine arts and a master's degree in design and illustration.

In 2016, she won the Cheltenham Illustration Award.
