= Andrew Wilson (Wellington cricketer) =

New Zealand cricketer

Personal information
- Full name: Andrew Marsh Wilson
- Born: 16 May 1954; Wellington, New Zealand
- Died: 5 June 2018 (aged 64)
- Batting: Left-handed
- Role: Batsman

Domestic team information
- Years: Team
- 1979–1980: Wellington

Career statistics
Competition	FC	LA
Matches	6	1
Runs scored	57	0
Batting average	9.50	0.00
100s/50s	0/0	0/0
Top score	27	0
Catches/stumpings	4/–	1/–
- Source: ESPNcricinfo, 24 April 2017

Andrew Marsh Wilson (16 May 1954 – 5 June 2018) was a New Zealand cricketer. He was a left-handed batsman who played for Wellington. He was born in Wellington.

Wilson made four appearances in the 1979–80 Shell Trophy. In five innings in the competition, he made a top score of 28 runs, achieved on his debut, against Auckland.

Wellington finished just two points off the top of the Shell Trophy table, two points behind leaders Northern Districts.
