= Andrew Norman Wilson (artist) =

American filmmaker

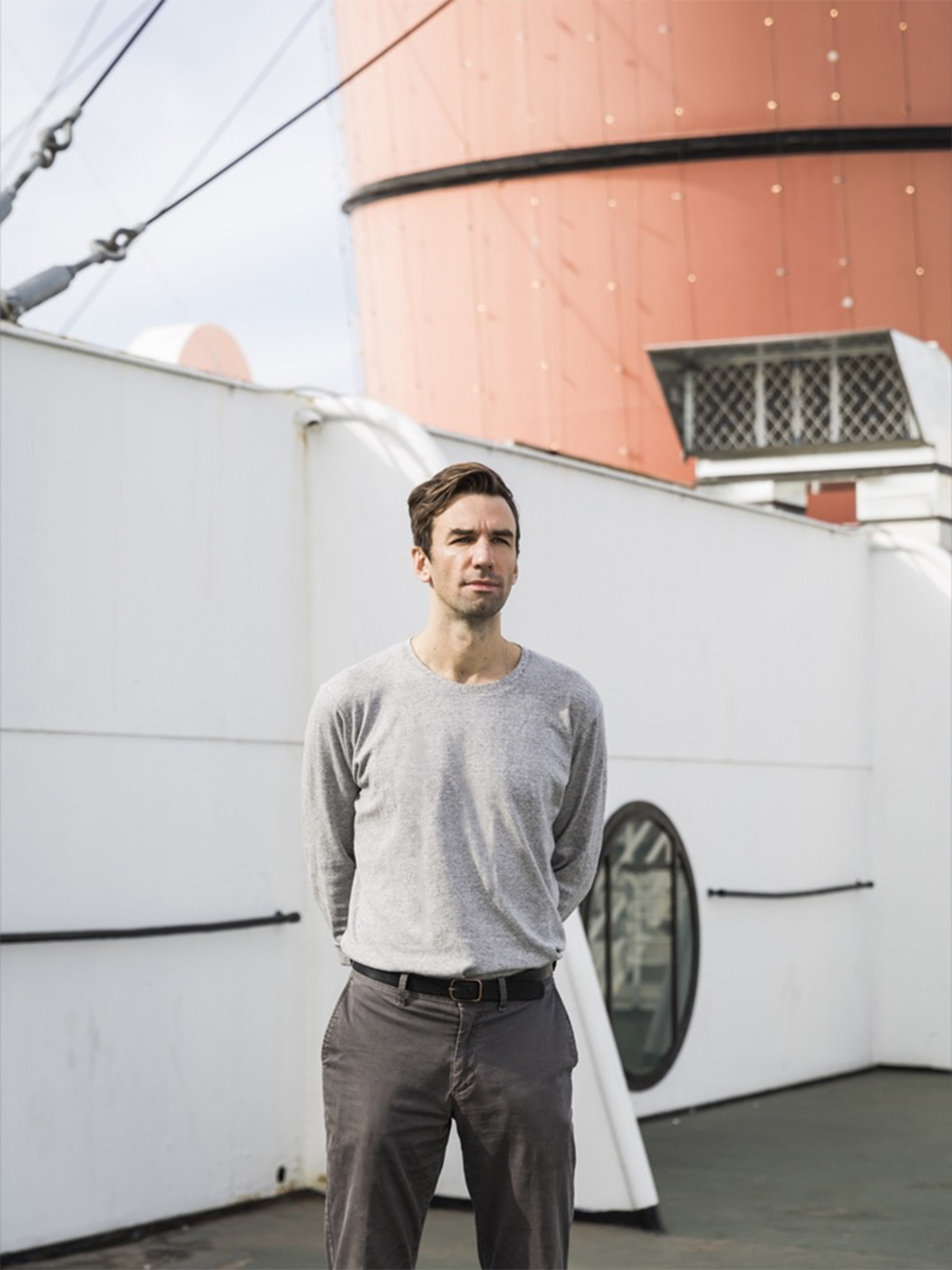
- Born: November 25, 1983 (age 42)
- Education: School of the Art Institute of Chicago
- Occupations: Filmmaker; Writer; Artist
- Years active: 2009–present
- Website: andrewnormanwilson.com

Andrew Norman Wilson is a writer, director, and artist based in New York City. His first work of video art, Workers Leaving the Googleplex, was widely circulated online and was later exhibited in the MoMA's main collection galleries. His first narrative short, In the Air Tonight, premiered in competition at the Sundance Film Festival. His essay "It's Not What the World Needs Right Now" went viral and led to his signing with CAA.

== Career ==
Wilson’s films have premiered at the Sundance Film Festival, the New York Film Festival, and the Rotterdam International Film Festival. His work is in collections such as the Museum of Modern Art, Whitney Museum of American Art, Getty Museum, and the Centre Pompidou, and he has exhibited at LUMA Arles, MoMA PS1, and the Gwangju Biennale and Berlin Biennale.

He has taught at UCLA, the SAIC, and Cooper Union, and lectured at the University of Oxford, University of Cambridge, Harvard University, and Yale University.

His work has been featured in Artforum, ArtReview, BOMB, Frieze, The New Yorker, and Wired, and he has published writing in Harper's, The Baffler, and The Paris Review.

In 2021, he was named one of the 25 New Faces of Independent Film by Filmmaker magazine. His films have won awards at the San Francisco International Film Festival and the International Film Festival Rotterdam. He has participated in the Oxbelly Director’s Lab and the Locarno Filmmakers Academy.

== Works ==
Wilson’s work Virtual Assistance (2009-11), made while he was an MFA candidate at the School of the Art Institute of Chicago, documents his collaboration with Akhil, a GetFriday personal assistant in India, in which Wilson reversed the service relationship by asking Akhil to assign him tasks and propose collaborative projects.

Wilson’s 2011 video artwork Workers Leaving the Googleplex combines footage shot while working as a video producer at Google’s headquarters in Mountain View with his voice-over narration. The work examines the company’s labor hierarchy through its yellow-badge “ScanOps” book-scanning workers and led to Wilson’s dismissal from Google before going viral online. ScanOps is a photographic series made of Google Books images in which the hands of ScanOps employees and errors in the scanning process are visible.

Wilson’s project SONE — formerly Stock Fantasy Ventures — proposed investor-funded commercial image concepts for distribution through both the art market and stock media platforms, producing imagery intended to reflect widespread financial uncertainty and discontent.

In 2016, Wilson made two 3D-animated films: The Unthinkable Bygone, which premiered at the Berlin Biennale and depicts Baby Sinclair, a puppet character from Jim Henson's 1990s animatronic sitcom Dinosaurs, bisected; and Ode to Seekers 2012, which premiered at the Whitney Museum of American Art and the Gwangju Biennale and features 3D-animated mosquitoes, oil pumpjacks, and syringes. His 2016 work Reality Models was made entirely in live action and features a breakaway marionette puppet modeled on one Wilson had seen as a child in the educational home video series Peppermint Park.

Co-written with James N. Kienitz Wilkins, Wilson’s semi-biographical fiction film Kodak (2019) draws on his father’s work at an early Kodak processing lab to imagine a dialogue between a blind, mentally unstable former film technician and the taped memoirs of George Eastman, combining photographs, home video footage, vintage Kodak advertisements, and animation.

Wilson’s short film In the Air Tonight is based on the urban legend surrounding Phil Collins's song In the Air Tonight. After Wilson released the film on the Phil Collins subreddit, it went on to screen at the New York Film Festival, the Sundance Film Festival, the International Film Festival Rotterdam, and more.

His next narrative short, Impersonator (2021), centers on a Hollywood Boulevard character impersonator and serves as a proof of concept for a planned feature-length heist film.

In 2024, Wilson published the essay “It’s Not What the World Needs Right Now” in The Baffler, a first-person account of his disillusionment with the contemporary art world and its economies of prestige, labor, and patronage. The essay went viral upon publication and was later adapted into a live comedy show. Following its publication, Wilson signed with Creative Artists Agency to develop a forthcoming memoir.

In 2025, he premiered the short documentary Silvesterchlausen at the International Film Festival Rotterdam. The film, which examines the Swiss folk tradition of the same name, was made during the development of his feature film Interlaken.

== Filmography ==
=== Film ===
Year	Title
2011	Workers Leaving the Googleplex
2011	Global Countdown
2011	Why is the No Video Signal Blue? Or, Color is No Longer Separable From Form, and the Collective Joins the Brightness Confound.
2014	Uncertainty Seminars
2014	SONE S/S 2014
2016	The Unthinkable Bygone
2016	Reality Models
2016	Ode to Seekers 2012
2018	I don't feel the way I'm supposed to feel
2019	Kodak
2020	Z = |Z/Z•Z-1 mod 2|-1: The Old Victrola
2020	Z = |Z/Z•Z-1 mod 2|-1: Lavender Town Syndrome
2020	In the Air Tonight
2021	Impersonator
2025	Silvesterchlausen

=== Music videos ===
Year	Title	Artist
2023	"The Fly"	U2
2024	"Nightmare Paint"	Oneohtrix Point Never
2024	"On an Axis"	Oneohtrix Point Never
2024	"Fallin In Love"	Duck Sauce
2025	"I Hate Antichrist"	John Maus
2025	"SickElixir"	Blawan
2026	"Losing You"	Naomi Scott

== Writing ==
=== Selected writings ===
- Harper's – "That Telltale Tingle"
- The Baffler – "It's Not What the World Needs Right Now"
- The Paris Review – "Tricks, Tension, Surface, Suspense"
- Notebook (MUBI) – "Ticked Off: Against the Clock"
- Notebook (MUBI) – "Multiplex | The Future of Sensory Cinema"
- Spike Art Magazine – "Do You Trust Art Critics?"
- Perić Collection – "What Is Contemporary Art for Today? And What Should It Be For, If Anything?"
- Art in America – "What Is Art Good For?"
- Heavy Traffic – "Remote Viewing"
- The Baffler – "Letter to Wild Wings"
- e-flux Criticism – "The Artist Leaving the Googleplex"
