= Northern Rock (disambiguation) =

Northern Rock is a former bank of the United Kingdom.

Northern Rock may also refer to:

- Northern Rock (R&ER locomotive)
  - Northern Rock II, sister locomotive to Northern Rock
- Landmark Mortgages, formerly Northern Rock Asset Management
- Northern Rock All*Star Cup
- Northern rock barnacle
- Northern Rock Foundation
- Northern rock mouse, a rodent
- Northern rock sole, a flatfish
- Northern Rock Tower

== See also ==
- Nationalisation of Northern Rock
- Southern Rock
