= Susan Herrington =

Landscape architect

Susan Herrington is a Vancouver-based landscape architect. She is a professor in the School of Architecture and Landscape Architecture (SALA) at The University of British Columbia, Vancouver, Canada, where she teaches in the Landscape Architecture, Environmental Design, and Architecture programs and served as the chair of Landscape Architecture (2016–2020).

== Education ==
Susan received her Master of Landscape Architecture from Harvard University's Graduate School of Design in 1991 and her Bachelor of Landscape Architecture from The State University of New York College of Environmental Science and Forestry in 1986.

== Work ==
Her research focuses on two areas of landscape theory: the role that landscape design plays in creating developmentally supportive outdoor play spaces for children, and how designed landscapes reflect ideas regarding nature and culture.

She has been a Registered Landscape Architect in the State of Connecticut since 1990.

Beginning in 1995, Susan taught at Iowa State University for two years. During her time there, she conducted a research project in the outdoor play yards at the Child Development Laboratory. The research involved collaborating with faculty and graduate students from the Department of Landscape Architecture and the Department of Human Development and Family Studies.

Susan has conducted research with funding from the Graham Foundation, the Social Science and Humanities Research Council, the Canada Council for the Arts, and the Canadian Institutes of Health Research. She has also conducted research in Germany with support from the German Academic Exchange, in Boston through a visiting research position at Harvard University Graduate School of Design, in Toronto through Social Sciences and Humanities Research Council (SSHRC), and as an early career scholar with the UBC Peter Wall Institute for Advanced Studies.

In 2003, she began a five-year study called Outside Criteria, which studies the outdoor play spaces of childcare centers in Vancouver as part of the Major Collaborative Research Initiative (MCRI)-funded Consortium for Health, Intervention, Learning and Development (CHILD) project.

Susan was also asked to return to the International Garden Festival, "Les Jardins de Metis in Quebec" and brought Master of Landscape Architecture (MLA) and Environmental Design (ENDS) students with her in June 2004 to build her garden, "Hip Hop”.[Contemporary Garden Aesthetics, Creations and Interpretations]

She was the President of the Society of Architectural Historians’ Landscape History Chapter from 2011 to 2013.

She is the author of Serious Fun: The Landscapes of Claude Cormier Landscape (ORO Editions, 2021), Theory in Design (Routledge, 2017), Cornelia Hahn Oberlander: Making the Modern Landscape (UVA Press, 2014), and On Landscapes (Routledge, 2009), published as part of Routledge's Thinking in Action Series.

== Awards and honors ==
2020

- UBC Killam Faculty Research Prize for 2020

2016

- Anne de Fort-Menares Award for her article, “Restoring a Modern Landscape in the Anthropocene: Cornelia Hahn Oberlander,” on the Friedman Residence

2015

- John Brinckerhoff Jackson Book Prize for her book Cornelia Hahn Oberlander: Making the Modern Landscape (University of Virginia Press, 2014).

2011-13

- President of the Society of Architectural Historians’ Landscape History Chapter from 2011 to 2013.

2010-11

- UBC Killam Faculty Fellow.

2004-5

- Awarded a UBC TLEF with Rick Kopak of UBC's Library and Information Science for Claude Glass: Creating a Digital Library.

1999

- First Place for Research from Places/EDRA (Environmental Design Research Association).

1997

- One of five finalists in the international competition to design a memorial for the Oklahoma City Bombing.

== Projects ==
2002 Schoolyard Park: 13-acres international design competition. Vancouver, BC: University of British Columbia Centre for Landscape Research. [Citation].

== Select publications ==
=== Books ===
- 2021 (with Treib, M) Serious Fun: The Landscapes of Claude Cormier
- 2017 Landscape theory in design
- 2014 Cornelia Hahn Oberlander: Making the modern landscape
- 2008 On Landscapes
- 2007 (with Chandra Lesmeister, Jamie Nicholls, and Kate Stefiuk) 7 Cs: An Informational Guide to Young Children’s Outdoor Play Spaces. Vancouver: Westcoast Childcare Resource Centre.

=== Selected journal articles ===
- 2022 Rereading St Ann’s Hill. Journal of Landscape Architecture Volume 17 – Issue 1: 6-21
- 2017 Profile of Cornelia hahn Oberlander. BC Society of Landscape Architects: Sightlines: June Issue; 16-17
- 2008 You Are Not Here: Sartre’s Phenomenological Ontology and the Architecture of Absence. Footprint: Delft Architecture Theory Journal. Issue #3 | Special Isse | Architecture and Phenomenology: 51-64
- 2008 Meiji-mura, Japan: negotiating time, politics, and location. Landscape Research 33: 407-23
- 2007 Gardens Can Mean. Landscape Journal 26: 302-17
- 2007 (with Jamie Nicholls) Outdoor Play Spaces in Canada: The Safety Dance of Standards as Policy. Critical Social Policy 27: 128-38
- 2006 Kindergartens: Shaping Childhood from Bad Blankenburg to Boston. Die Gartenkunst 18: 81-95
- 2006 Framed Again: The Picturesque Aesthetics of Contemporary Landscapes. Landscape Journal 25: 22-37
- 2006 (with Chandra Lesmeister) The Design of Landscapes at Child Care Centres: Seven Cs. Landscape Research 31: 63-82
- 2001 Garden Pedagogy: Romanticism to Reform. Landscape Journal 20: 30-47 and back cover.
- 2000 (with Lisa Gelfand) Getty Centered/Centerless. Critiques of Built Works in Landscape Architecture 5: 40–48.
- 1999 Playgrounds as Community Landscapes. Built Environment: Playgrounds in the Built Environment 25: 25–34.
- 1998 The Garden in Fröbel’s Kindergarten: Beyond the Metaphor. Studies in the History of Gardens and Designed Landscapes International Quarterly 18: 326–38.
- 1998 (with Kenneth Mark Studtmann) From Yard to Garden: New Directions in the Design of Children’s Outdoor Play Environments. Landscape and Urban Planning 42: 191–205.
- 1997 The Received View of Play and the Subculture of Infants. Landscape Journal 16: 149–60.
- 1994 Strange Scenes Within the Landscape. Critiques of Built Works of Landscape Architecture 1: 13–18.

=== Selected book chapters ===
- 2019 Neo-picturesque. Philosophical Perspectives on Ruins, Monuments, and Memorials (Jeanette Bicknell, Jennifer Judkins, Carolyn Korsmeyer, editors): 133-146
- 2018 A Phenomenological Method for Landscape Studio. Teaching Landscape (Karsten Jorgensen, editor): 80-94
- 2015 Cornelia Hahn Oberlander: A Model Modern. Women, Modernity, and Landscape Architecture (Sonja Duempelmann and John Beardsley, editors): 185–202
- 2014 The Forests of Canada: Seeing the Forests for the Trees. Managing the Unknown: Essays on Environmental Ignorance (Frank Uekötter and Uwe Lüb, editors): 53-70
- 2013 An Ontology of Landscape Design. The Routledge Companion to Landscape Studies. Routledge, 2013. 373–383.
- 2007 When Art Is a Garden: Benny Farm Gardens by Claude Cormier. Contemporary Garden Aesthetics, Creations and Interpretations (Michel Conan, editor). Cambridge: Harvard University Press, 17–32.
- 2007 Hybrids: Reshaping the Contemporary Garden in Métis / Formes Hybrides: Redessiner le Jardin Contemporain à Métis (Lesley Johnstone, editor). Myth Busters/ Déboulonner les Mythes. Vancouver: Blueimprint, 126–30.
- 2007 Outdoor Spaces. Schools and Kindergartens (Mark Dudek, editor) Berlin: Bikhauser, 42–45.
- 2007 People, Plants, and Parks: Competing Ideals. Naturschutz und Demokratie!? (Gert Groening and Joachim Wolschke-Bulmahn, editors) Leibniz: Universitat Hannover, 175–82.
- 2005 The Sustainable Schoolyard. Children's Spaces (Mark Dudek, editor). London: Architectural Press, 215–44.
- 2004 Taste Buds: Cultivating a Canadian Cuisine. Eating Architecture (Jamie Horwitz and Paulette Singley, editors). Cambridge: MIT Press: 33–50.
- 2004 Muscle Memory: Reflections on the North American Schoolyard. Childhood Across Time and Space: Multiple Lenses, Multiple Images (Hillel Goelman, Sheila Marshall, and Sally Ross, editors). Toronto: University of Toronto Press: 91–108.
