= Douglas Ferreira (locomotive) =

Narrow-gauge loco built in 2005

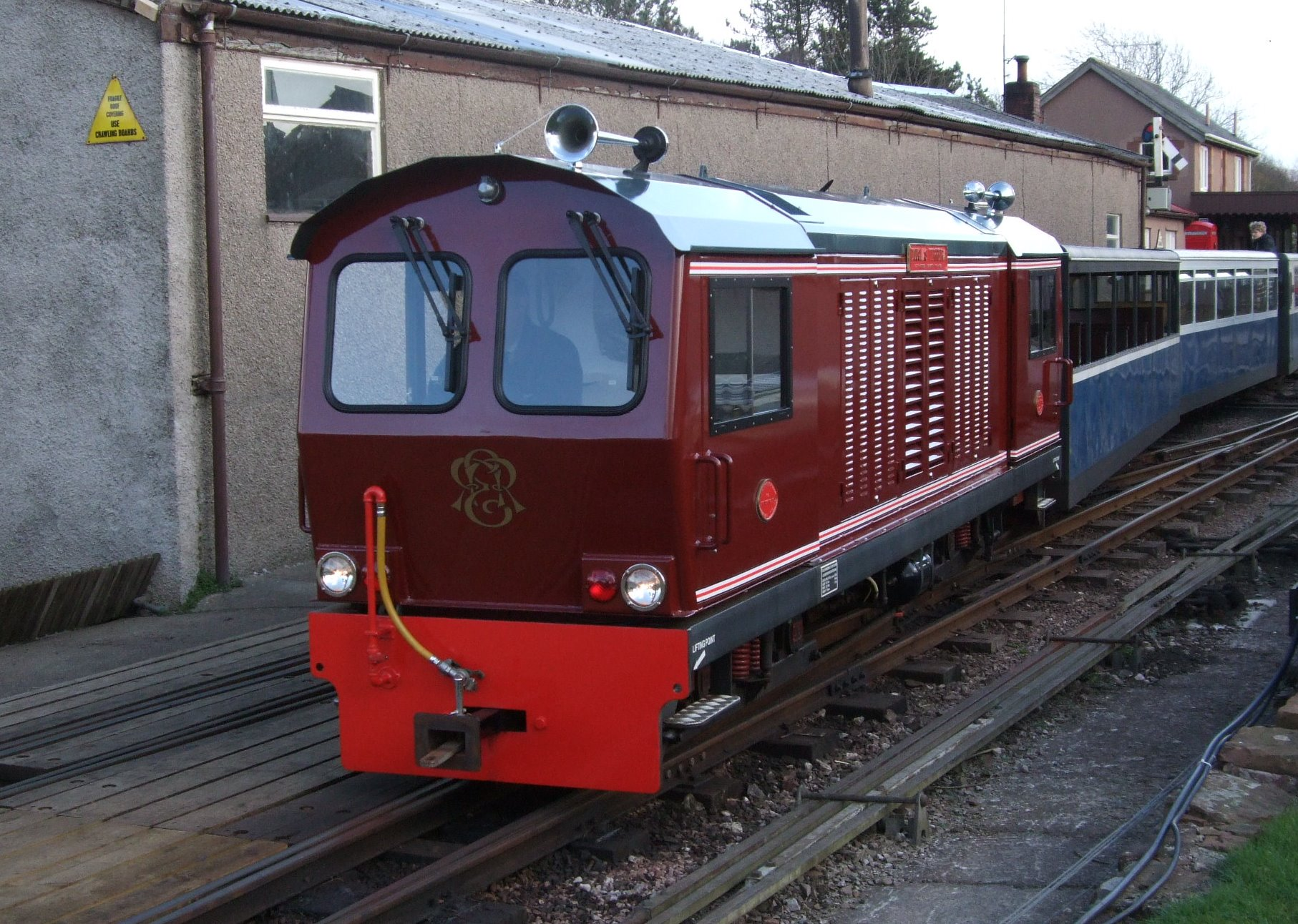
- 'Douglas Ferreira' at Ravenglass
Type and origin
- Power type: Diesel
- Designer: Ravenglass & Eskdale Railway Preservation Society
- Builder: TMA Engineering
- Build date: 2005
Specifications
- Configuration
  - Whyte: B-B
- Gauge: 15 inches (381 mm)
- Length: 20 feet 2.5 inches (6 m)
- Height: 6 feet (2 m)
- Loco weight: 7 metric tons (6.9 long tons; 7.7 short tons)
Performance figures
- Maximum speed: 27 miles per hour (43 km/h)
- Tractive effort: 125 BHP
Career
- Operators: Ravenglass and Eskdale Railway
- Numbers: ICL No. 11
- Official name: Douglas Ferreira
- Current owner: Ravenglass & Eskdale Railway Preservation Society

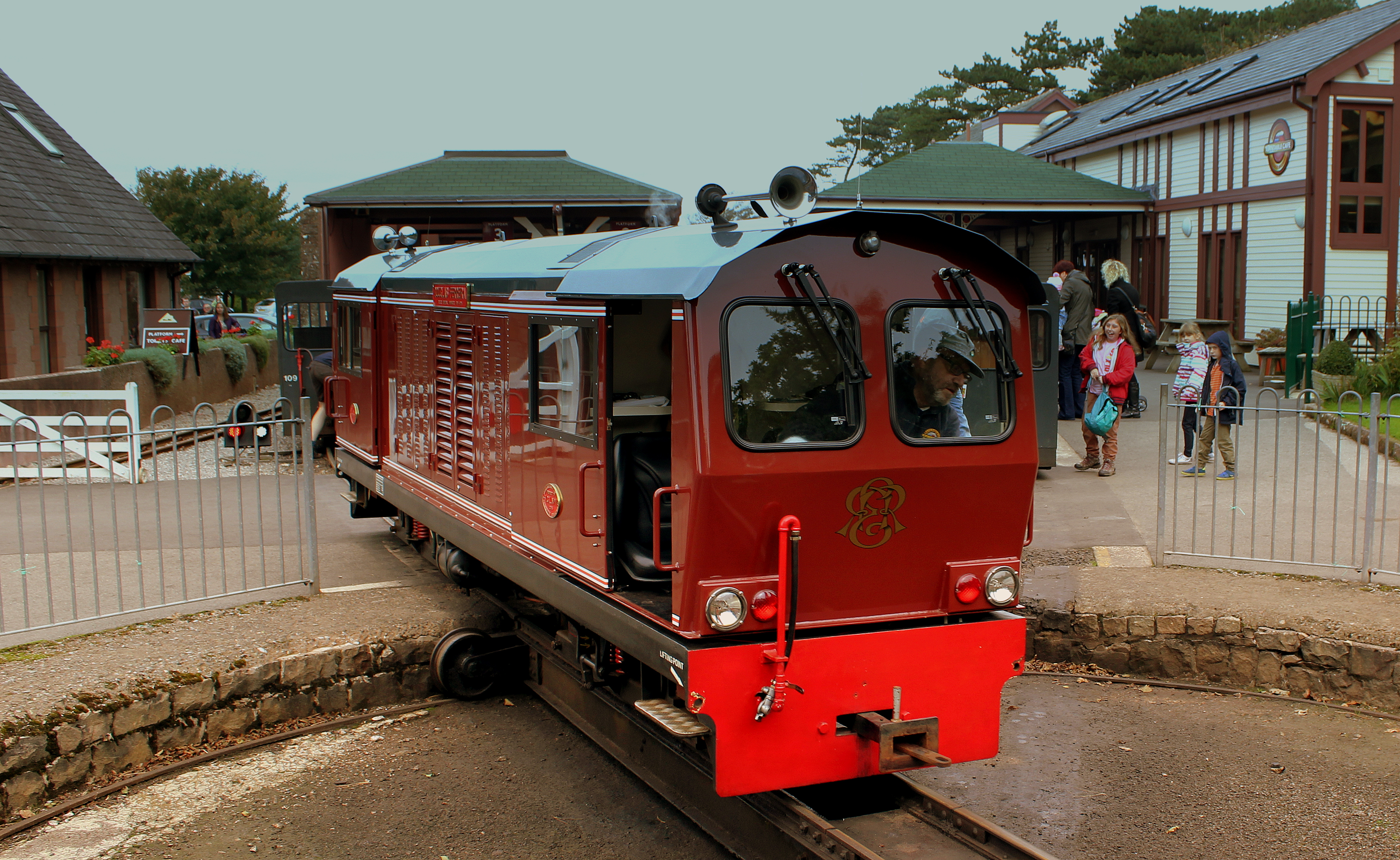
Douglas Ferreira on the turntable

The Douglas Ferreira is a 15-inch gauge diesel-hydraulic locomotive that was built in 2005 by TMA Engineering for on the Ravenglass and Eskdale Railway in Cumbria, England. Its wheel configuration is B-B and was named after Douglas Ferreira, the former General Manager of the railway from 1961 until 1994.

It is owned and was designed by a working group from the Ravenglass & Eskdale Railway Preservation Society and now works passenger trains almost every time they are scheduled, specifically the off-peak trains during the summer months and the vast majority of service trains during winter. It worked 9,230 miles (14,854 kilometres) on the railway in 2006, and in 2007 it travelled 8,958 miles (14,417 kilometres) between Ravenglass and Dalegarth.

The locomotive carries the Indian red livery of the Furness Railway, which worked on the Cumbrian Coast Line until 1922, with the White and Red lining of the T & J Harrison Shipping Line (Ferreira's first employer), colloquially known as "Two of Fat and One of Lean", at the top of the body on the engine house and cab sides. The Indian Red is identical to that used on River Mite, the steam locomotive owned by the R&ER Preservation Society. It uses a Westinghouse air brake system which is combined to provide a singular train brake and locomotive brake operation, however the locomotive also has a separate parking brake. It is noted for also using very bright aircraft landing lights as headlights at either end.

A development of the similar Lady Wakefield locomotive, built by the railway in 1980 and the John Southland and Captain Howey locomotives built by TMA Engineering for the Romney, Hythe and Dymchurch Railway, the locomotive upholds a high miles-per-casualty ratio, making it an invaluable asset to the railway.

In September 2008, Douglas Ferreira made its first visit to another 15-inch gauge line, the Bure Valley Railway's Super Power event. It suffered a catastrophic power unit failure in April 2013, and was dispatched to TMA Engineering for a replacement to be fitted. At the time, the railway was already struggling for operational motive power, due to the major fire in the engineering workshops and unavailability of steam locomotives. 1929-vintage Perkins was instated as the only available diesel locomotive available for passenger service, as Lady Wakefield was also receiving a new power unit in Birmingham, while Shelagh of Eskdale had been out of service for several years.

As of May 2013, the locomotive was at TMA's workshops in Birmingham.

== See also ==
- Ravenglass and Eskdale Railway locomotives
