= Shuzenji Romney Railway =

Ridable miniature railway on the Izu Peninsula in Japan

Coordinates: 34.974569°N 138.910924°E

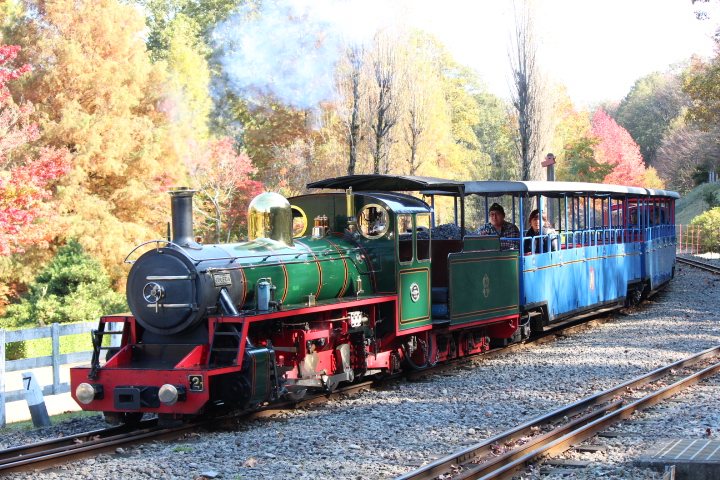
Cumbria

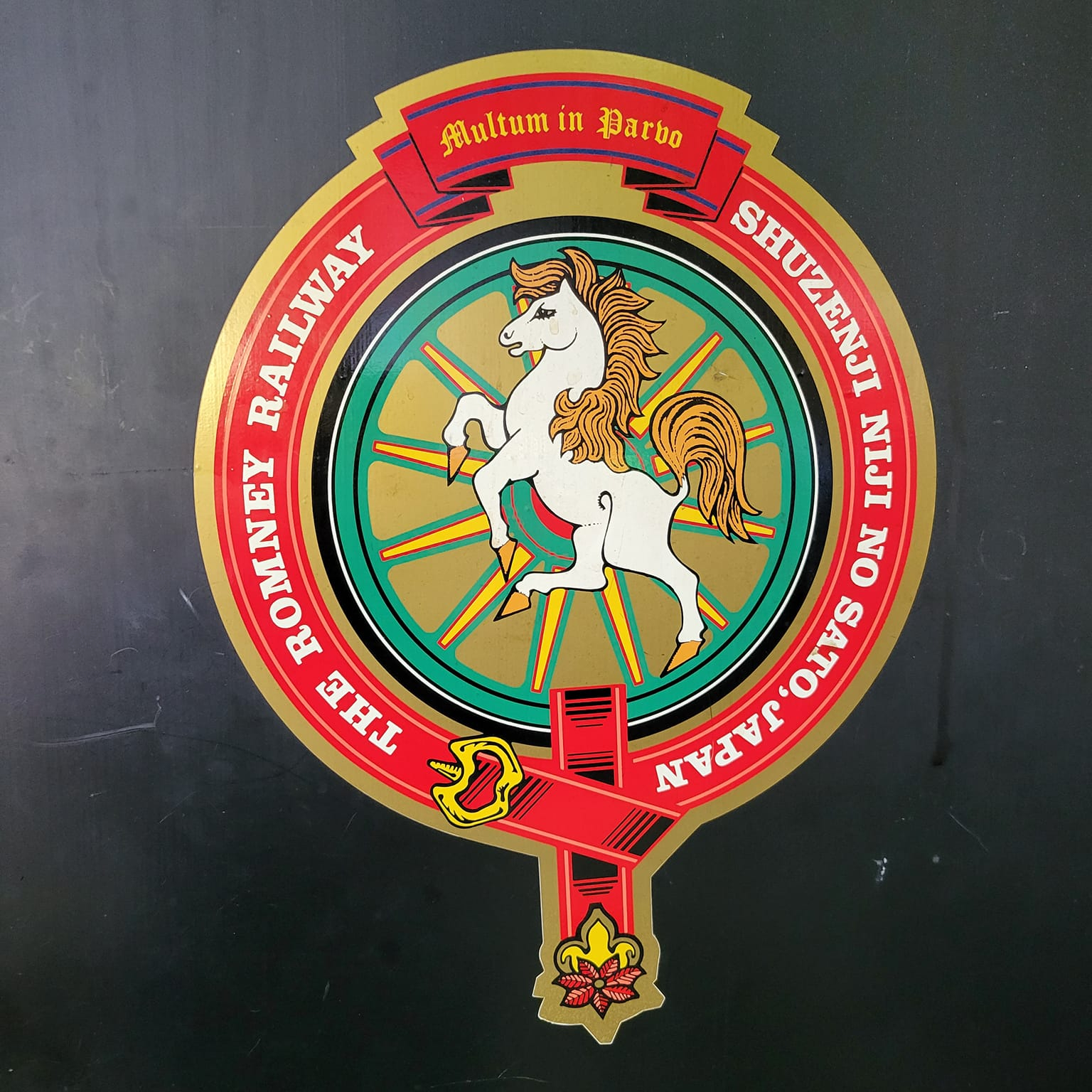
Coat of Arms of the railway

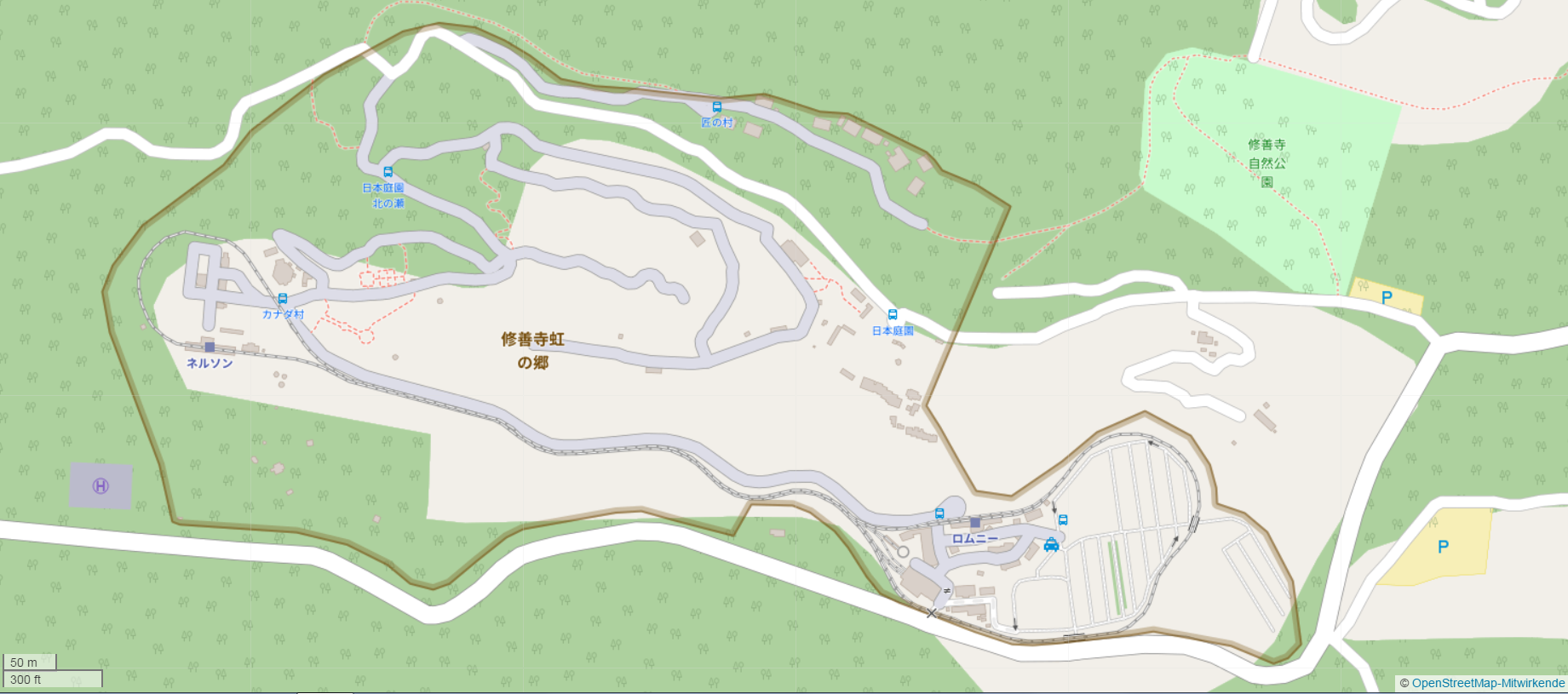
Shuzenji Romney Railway map

The Shuzenji Romney Railway (ロムニー鉄道, Romney Railway) is a 1.2 km, 15 in (381 mm) gauge ridable miniature railway located in Niji-no-Sato (Rainbow Park) in Izu, Shizuoka, on the Izu Peninsula in Japan. It is Japan's first 15-inch gauge railway. It is based on the English Romney, Hythe & Dymchurch Railway on the English Channel coast in Kent, which opened in 1927. The railway operates using a mixture of steam and diesel locomotives and enclosed saloon carriages. Its primary two steam engines were built by the Ravenglass and Eskdale Railway in Cumbria, England, and are based on that line's 1976 Northern Rock 2-6-2 steam locomotive. Its No. 2 locomotive Ernest W. Twining was acquired from the Fairbourne Railway in Wales when that line converted to 12 1/4 in (311 mm) gauge. There is also a small 15-inch gauge railway museum.

== Locomotives ==
No.	Name	Livery	Locomotive type	Wheel Arrangement	Builder	Year built	Status
1	Northern Rock II	Highland Railway green	Steam	2-6-2	Ravenglass & Eskdale Railway	1989	In traffic
2	Ernest W. Twining	Dark blue	Steam	4-6-2	G & S Co.	1950	Static display
3	John Southland II	Two-tone red	Diesel	B-B DM	TMA Engineering	1988	In traffic
4	Cumbria	Brunswick green	Steam	2-6-2	Ravenglass & Eskdale Railway	1992	In traffic
5	City of Birmingham	Two-tone green	Diesel	0-6-0 DM	TMA Engineering	1992	Currently inactive
C11 328		Black	Steam	2-6-4T	Kanazawa Institute of Technology	1995	Static display

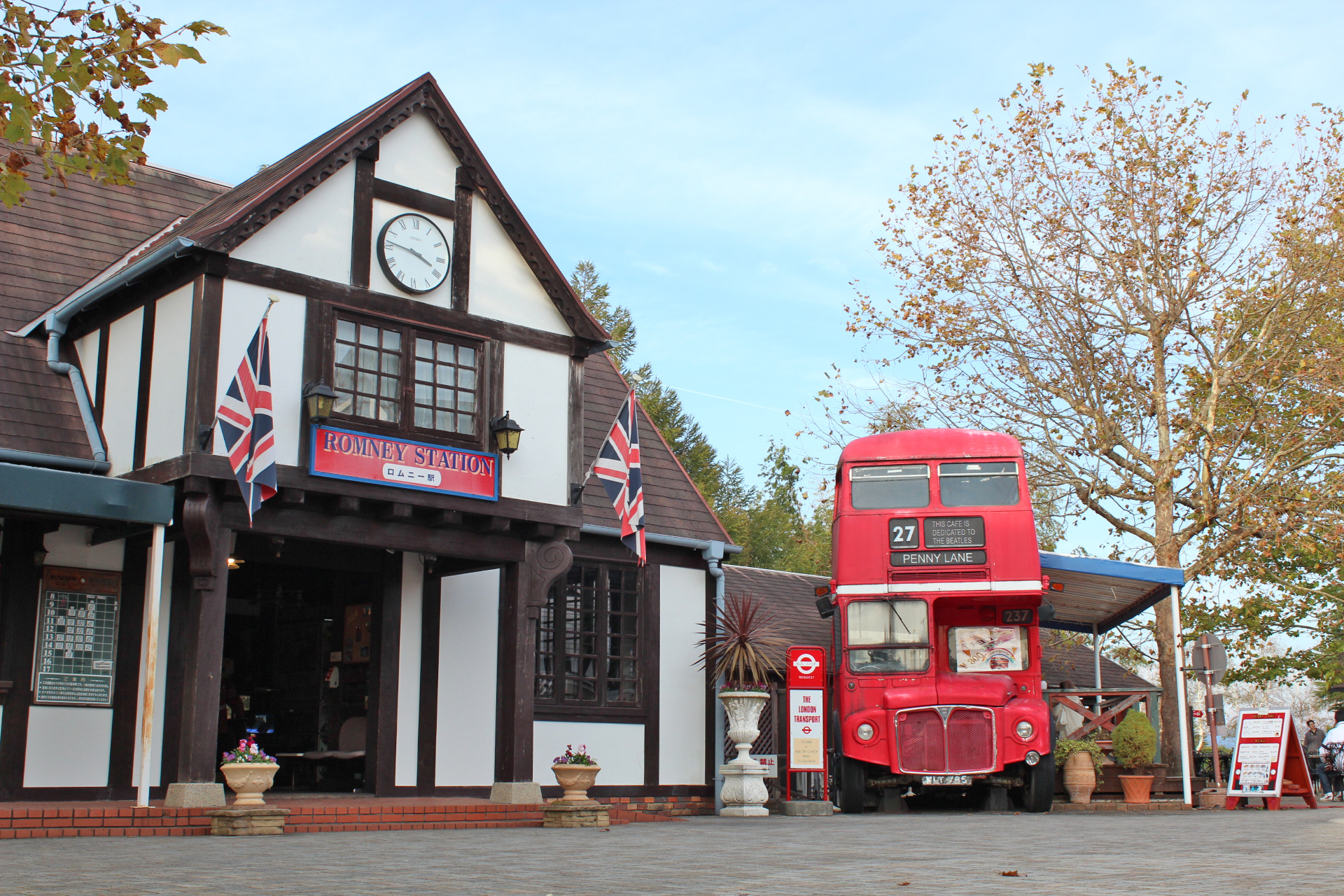
Facade of Romney station

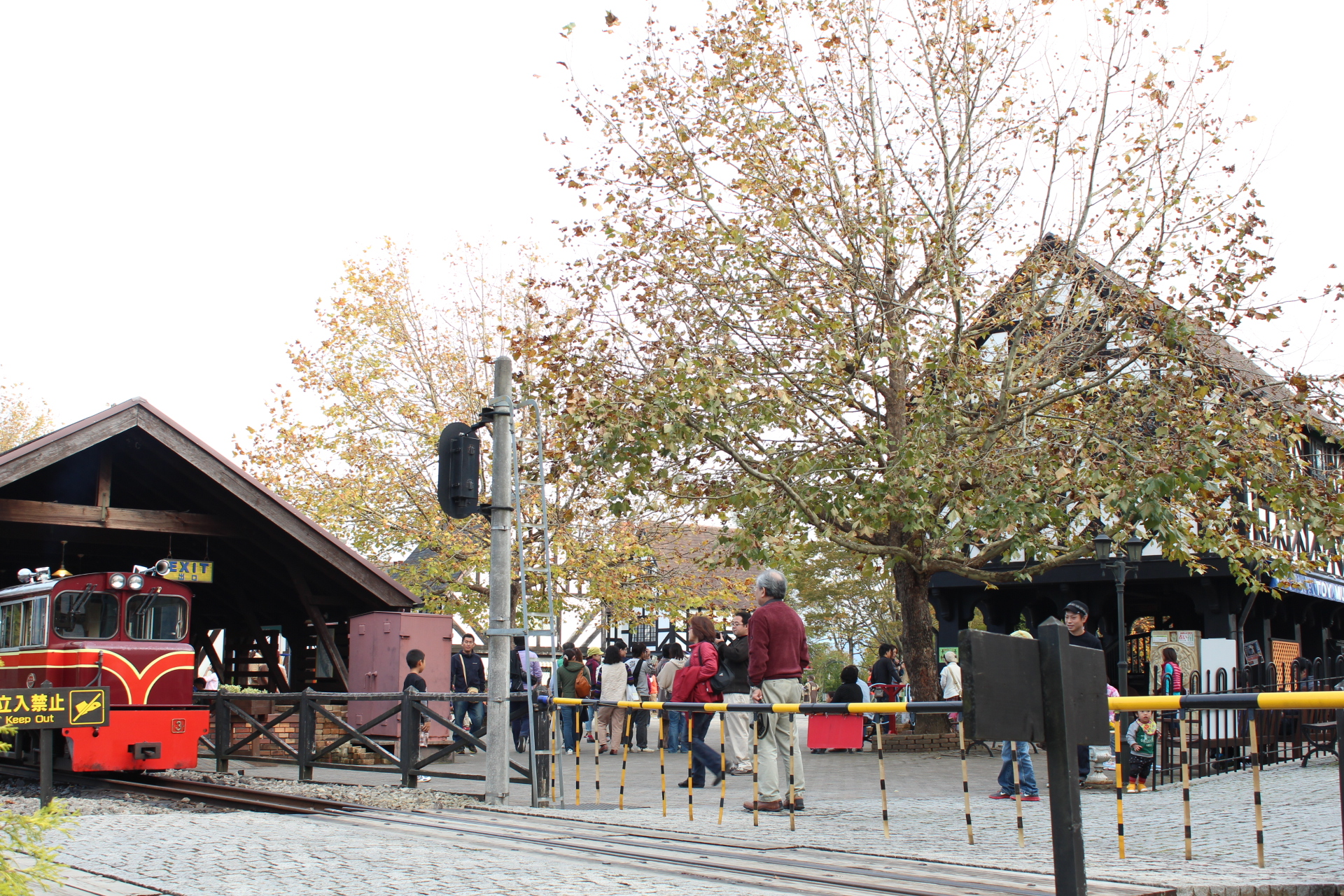
Romney station and British village

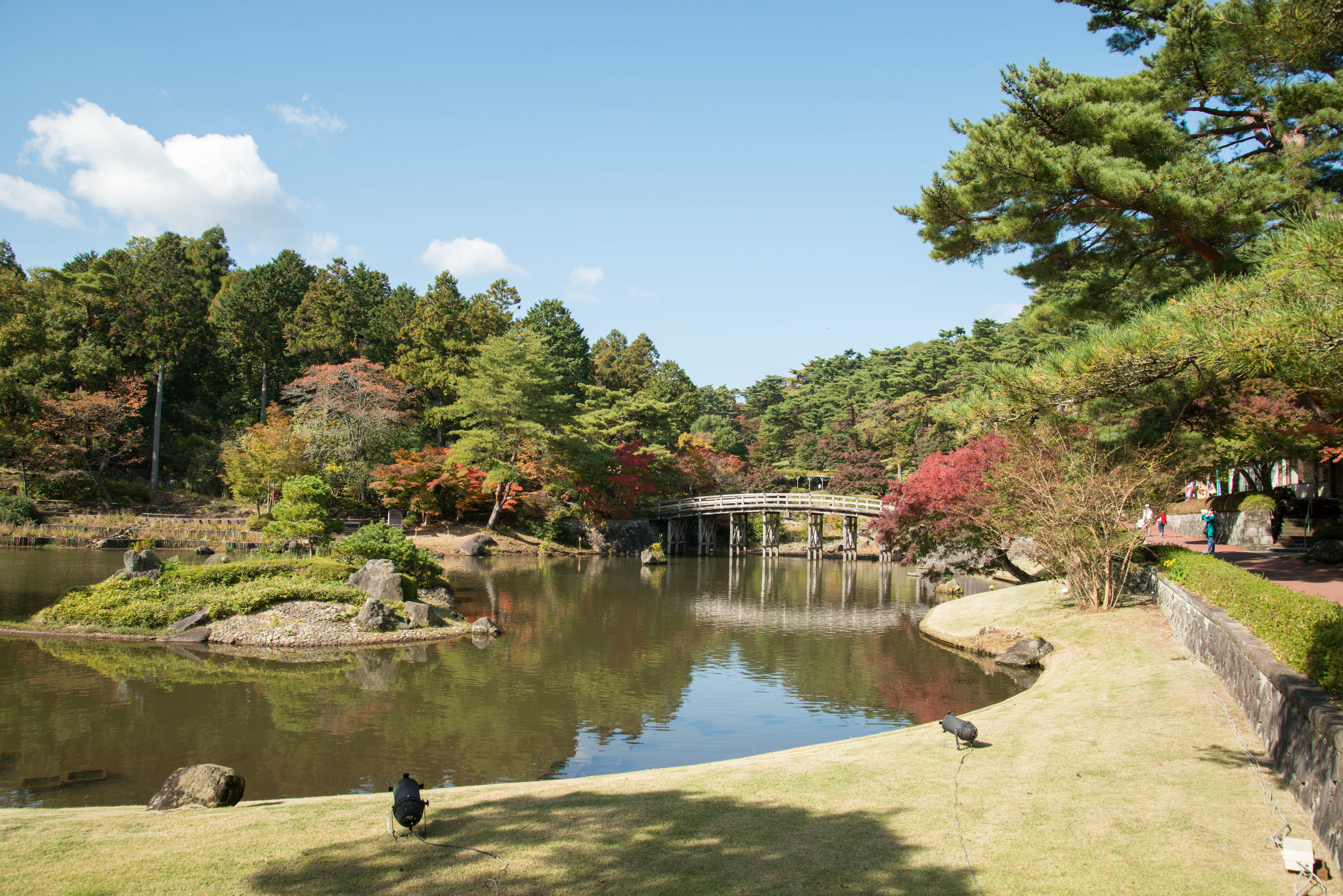
Japanese garden

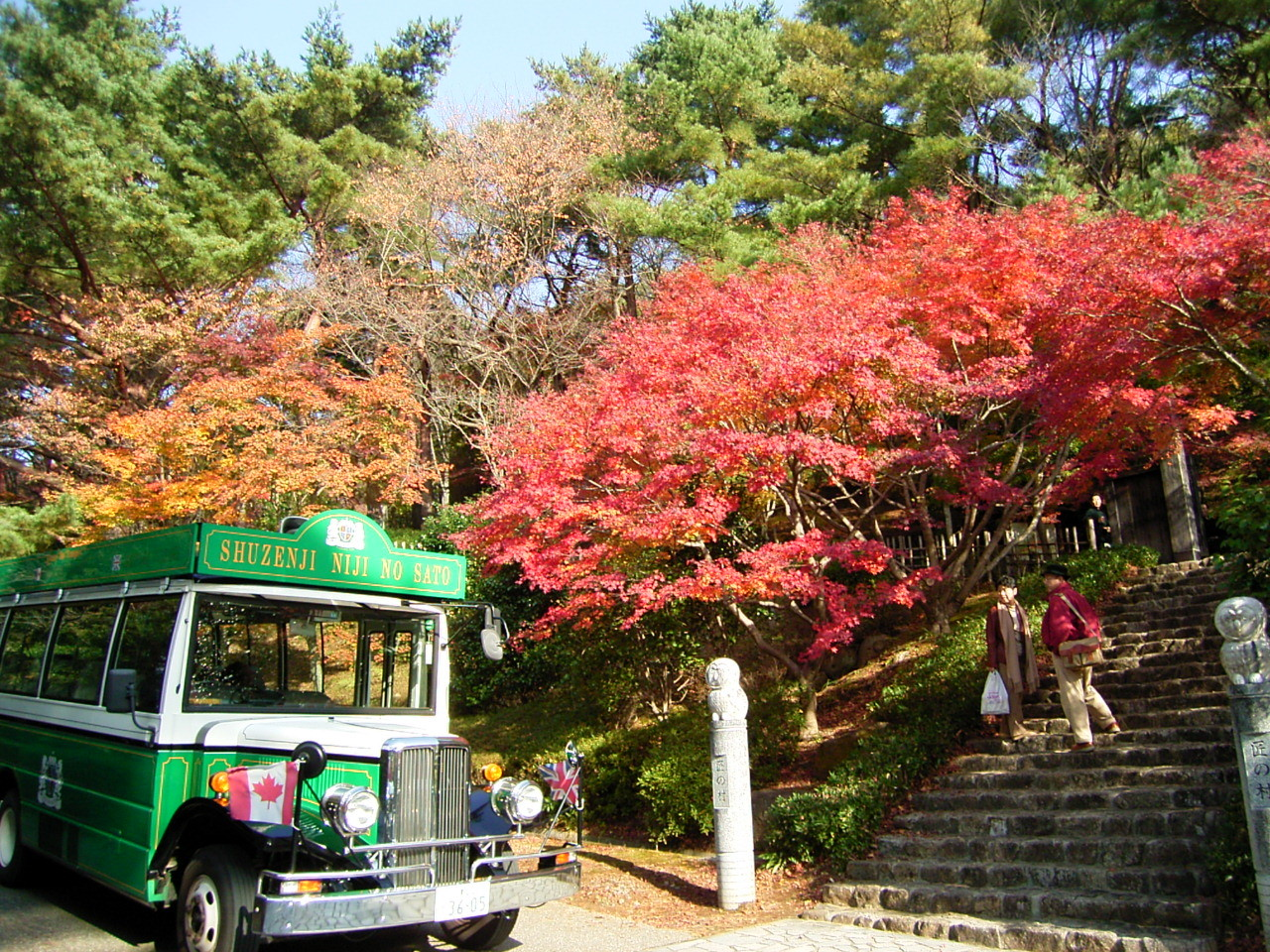
Romney Bus

== See also ==
- Minimum-gauge railway
- Joyful Train
- Rail transport in Japan
