= Douglas Ferreira =

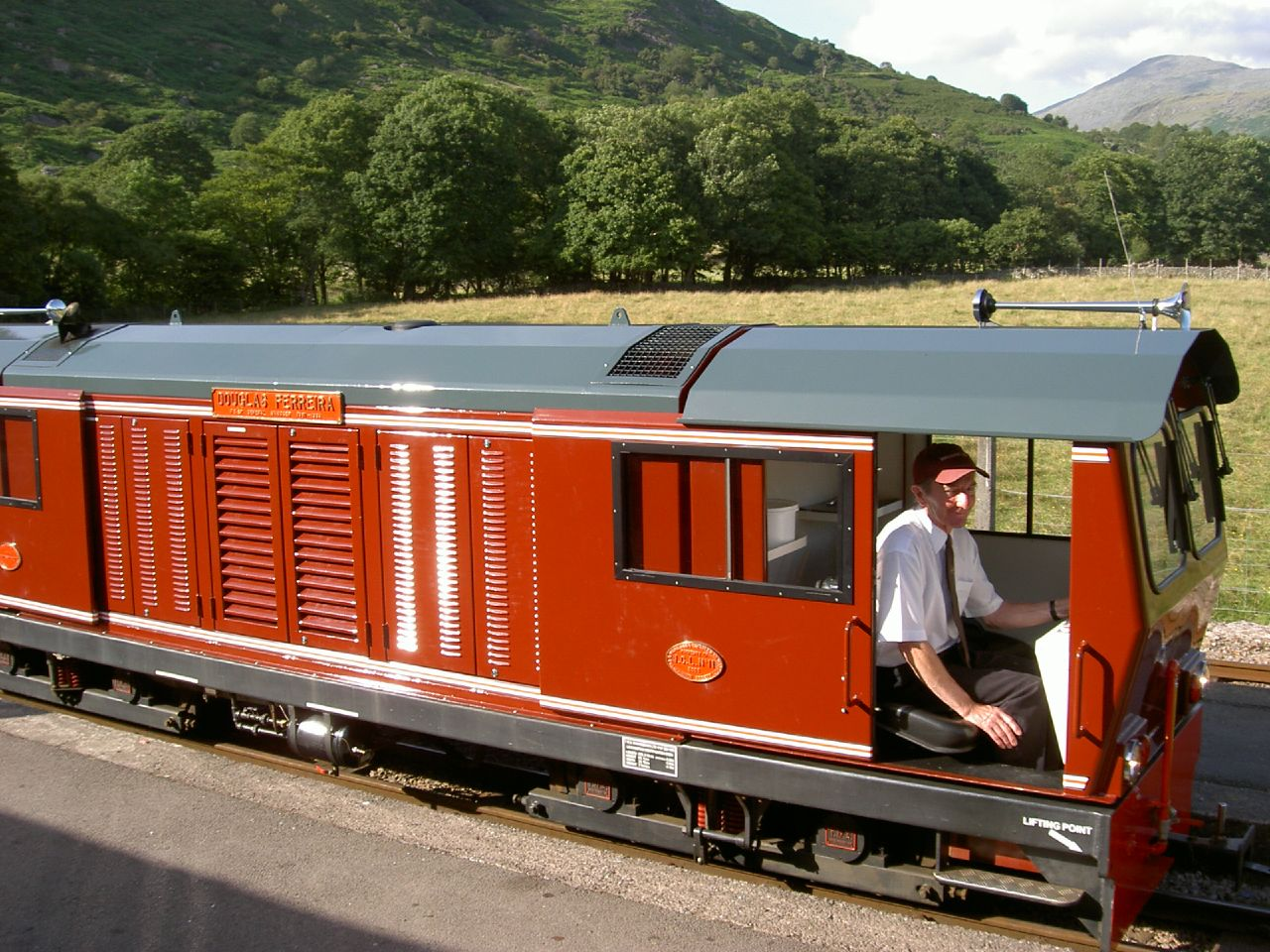
R&ER locomotive Douglas Ferreira

Douglas Martin Edward Ferreira, O.B.E., (1929–2003) was the longest-serving general manager of the Ravenglass & Eskdale Railway, a heritage railway in Cumbria, England known as the "Ratty". He was at the heart of the "Ratty" for 34 years.

== Early life ==
A pupil at the local St. Bees School, on leaving, Ferreira joined the Harrison Shipping Line as a cadet. After some years with the Line, he went to work in Preston and there he was salesman for the Company that made Bond Minicars, (Sharp's Commercials Ltd). It was during his time there that he drove Bond 3 wheel cars from Lands End to John o Groats, over the Semmering Pass through the snow, and became the first person to drive on a British motorway. He was first to set off on the opening of the Preston by-pass which became the first section of the new M6, in a Bond Minicar.

== Career ==
When the Ratty was put up for sale by auction in 1960, Doug brought his friend Guy Moser into the short but intensive campaign to secure the future of the line. Moser did all the legal work when it was bought by the Ravenglass & Eskdale Railway Preservation Society supported by Colin Gilbert and Sir Wavell Wakefield, who then appointed Ferreira as the new general manager, because of his experience gained as a volunteer on the newly reopened Festiniog Railway.

During Ferreira's era, many changes occurred on the railway including the arrival of new locomotives - River Mite, Northern Rock, Royal Anchor, Shelagh of Eskdale, Lady Wakefield and Bonnie Dundee. Many saloon coaches appeared, and two locomotives based on 'Northern Rock', 'Northern Rock II' and 'Cumbria' were constructed for export to Japan.

Ferreira was able to think laterally, and he came up with many pioneering ideas, able to solve problems. Many other railways benefited from his work on the Ratty and his efforts to turn the Minor Railways Association into the heritage railways movement. High among many things was the complete relaying of the R&ER track, using hardwood sleepers and rail of a uniform heavy weight.

In 1975, the Ratty faced a problem - there was need to operate one train in section, as opposed to a time interval system. As conventional train staff and ticket was not practical, Uwe Jens Jansen a friend of Ferreira helped him introduce a new radio control and train order system based on European practice, which Jansen had taken from Hamburg to the Zillertalbahn in Austria.

In 1994, Ferreira retired as general manager, and the following year was awarded an O.B.E. for his services to tourism. In his retirement, he continued with his interest in the Ratty, and also worked as a consultant on railway projects worldwide from the Darjeeling Himalaya to Syria.

== Death and legacy ==
He died on 24 May 2003 shortly after laying out a Lakeland rally route for the Bond Minicar Club. It is thought that few people have left such an enduring legacy on the Ratty as he did. A new memorial diesel-hydraulic locomotive, built in 2005 and owned by the railway's preservation society was named Douglas Ferreira in his honour.
