= Northern Rock II =

Northern Rock II entering a station.

Northern Rock II is a steam locomotive built by Ravenglass and Eskdale Railway, and currently being operated by the Shuzenji Romney Railway in the Izu Peninsula. It is one of two active steam locomotives at the railway.

== In the United Kingdom ==
Northern Rock II was designed and built after its sister locomotive, Northern Rock.

Built in 1989 at the Ravenglass and Eskdale Railway, it was to be shipped to the Japanese amusement park undergoing construction at the time, Niji-no-Sato, and its miniature 15-inch gauge railway, Shuzenji Romney Railway.

After being built and tested at Ravenglass, the locomotive was shipped to Japan in time for the park's opening on April 1st, 1990.

== In Japan ==
Northern Rock II during the Thanks-Illumination event.

Northern Rock II is currently home to the Shunzenji Romney Railway, along with Cumbria, John Southland II, and City of Birmingham, although Northern Rock II is currently gone under repairs, and is absent at the railway, and when the locomotive will return is unknown.

During the park's annual Winter holidays event (The Thanks-Illumination), Northern Rock II is equipped with LED lights matching the locomotive's colour, lighting up the train, along with its carriages. Northern Rock II is not operated as usual during the event, and the specially lit-up train is not operated until night.

== Appearance ==
Northern Rock II is painted in Highland Railway Green, although the official website states that the colour is Muscat Green.

The locomotive is a 2-6-2 type locomotive.

The windows are square shaped, and the locomotive's dome is cylinder shaped.

Northern Rock II has been designated as No.1 within the railway.

Rarely, Northern Rock II is seen with its head lamp (The same one seen in the image at top), although most likely not functional.
