= International Garden Festival =

Horticultural festival in Liverpool, England

EXPO 1984 Liverpool

Overview
- BIE-class: Horticultural exposition
- Name: International Garden Festival
- Building(s): Liverpool-Garden-Festival-Dome
- Area: 95 hectares (230 acres)
- Visitors: 3,380,000

Location
- Country: England
- City: Liverpool
- Coordinates: 53°22′21″N 2°57′21″W

Timeline
- Opening: 2 May 1984 by Queen Elizabeth II
- Closure: 14 October 1984

Horticultural expositions
- Previous: Internationale Gartenbauaustellung 83 in Munich
- Next: Expo '90 in Osaka

Specialized expositions
- Previous: 1982 World's Fair in Knoxville
- Next: Expo '85 in Tsukuba

Universal expositions
- Previous: Expo '70 in Osaka
- Next: Seville Expo '92 in Seville

Simultaneous
- Specialized: 1984 Louisiana World Exposition

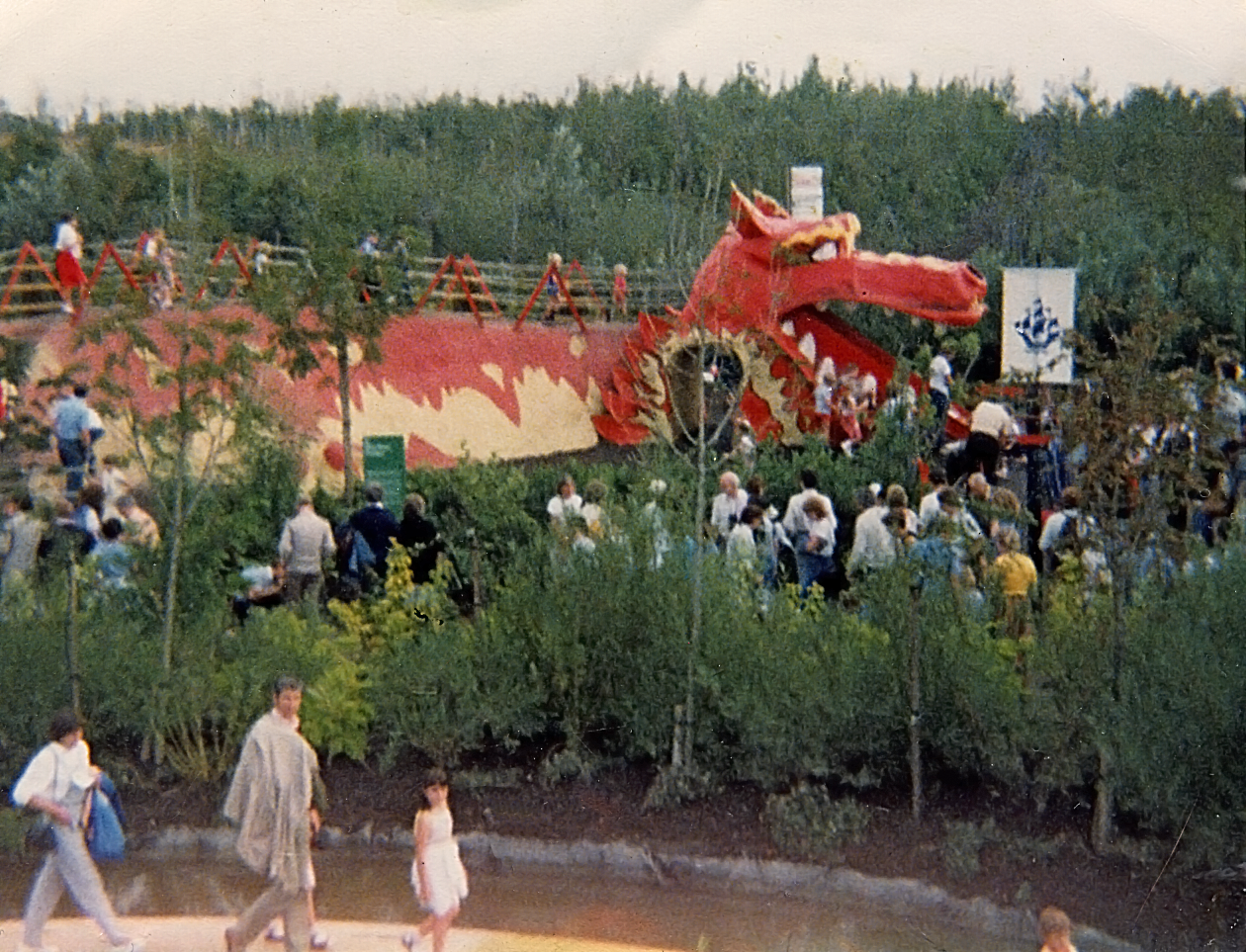
Dragon slide exhibit from the Garden Festival. This was designed by the winner of a competition on the Blue Peter TV show.

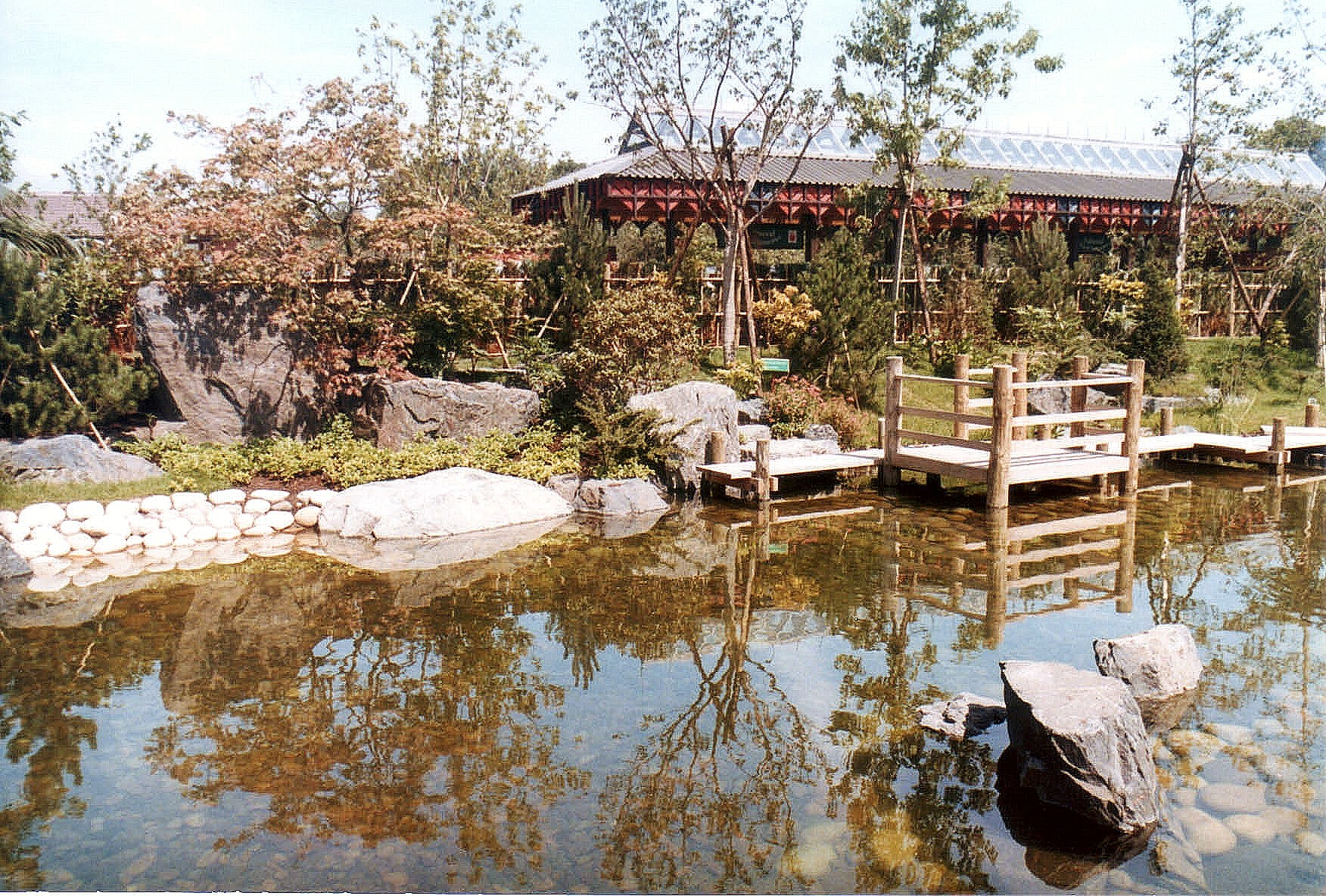
The Japanese Garden

Commemorative coffee mug from the festival, showing a cartoon Liver bird.

The International Garden Festival was a garden festival recognised by the International Association of Horticultural producers (AIPH) and the Bureau International des Expositions (BIE), which was held in Liverpool, England from 2 May to 14 October 1984. It was the first such event held in Britain, and became the model for several others held during the 1980s and early 1990s. The aim was to revitalise tourism and the city of Liverpool which had suffered cutbacks, and the idea came from Conservative Environment Minister Michael Heseltine. The festival was hugely popular, attracting 3,380,000 visitors.

== The festival ==
The international horticultural exposition was held on a 950,000-square-metre (10,200,000 sq ft) derelict industrial site south of Herculaneum Dock, near the Dingle and overlooking the River Mersey. On this site were built sixty individual gardens, including a Japanese garden and pagodas. A large exhibition space, the Festival Hall, formed the centrepiece of the site and housed numerous indoor exhibits.

Other attractions included a walk of fame, featuring numerous stars connected with Liverpool, and a light railway system (see below). Public artwork included the Yellow Submarine, a statue of John Lennon, a Blue Peter ship, the Wish You Were Here tourist sculpture, a red dragon slide, a large red bull sculpture and Kissing Gate (by Alain Ayers).

== The Festival Railway ==
A 15 in (381 mm) gauge minimum-gauge railway system provided transport around the site. The light railway system consisted of a mainline providing transport links between a series of stations at key locations around the festival site, and a junction linking to a branch line. There were also extensive shed and workshop facilities. A considerable investment was made in the purchase of passenger coaches, and in the purchase and installation of permanent way. Additional passenger coaches (of the 20-seat 'teak' saloon type) were borrowed from the Romney, Hythe and Dymchurch Railway in Kent. The prohibitive cost of purchasing locomotives was avoided through the use of engines which were deemed 'spare' on other existing 15 in (381 mm) gauge minimum-gauge railways, particularly the United Kingdom's two most extensive railways of this gauge, the Romney, Hythe and Dymchurch Railway, and the Ravenglass and Eskdale Railway. The cost of building and hiring passenger coaches was partly offset through sponsorship by the National Westminster Bank, whose name and logo was painted on the side of every coach. The visiting locomotives, leased coaches, and purpose-built passenger carriages provided the mainline service, whilst the branch line was operated on a shuttle basis by a 1970s-built diesel multiple unit railcar set (named Silver Jubilee) on loan from the Ravenglass and Eskdale Railway.

== The festival site ==
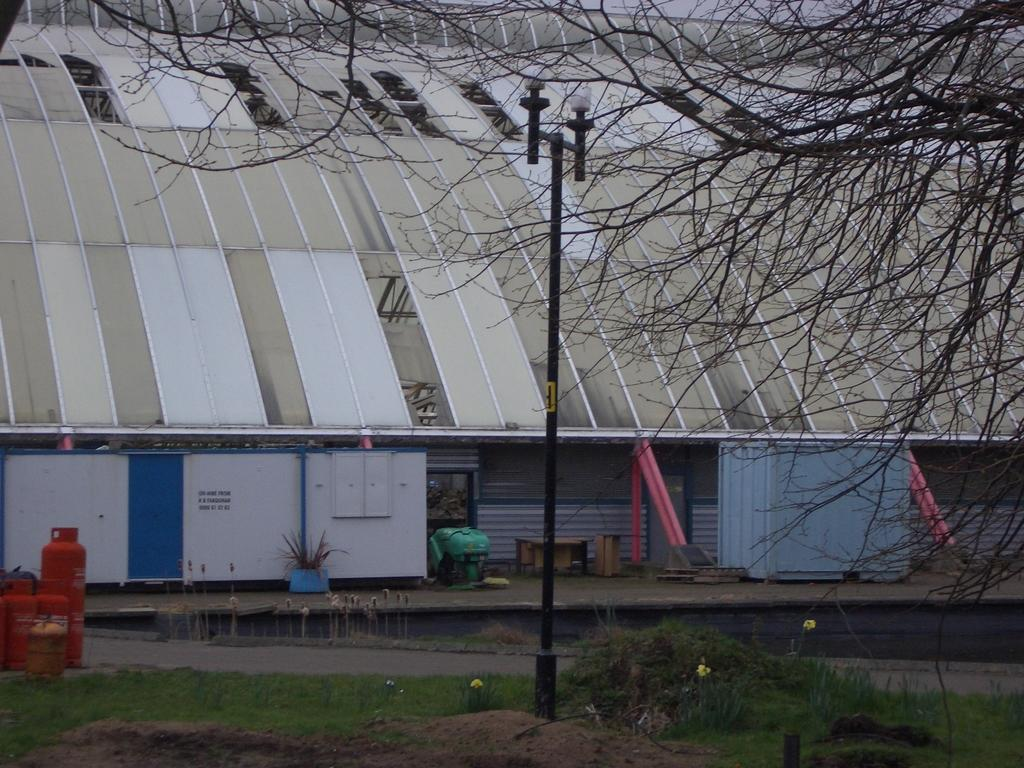
The Festival Hall, once the focal point of the Garden Festival, shortly before demolition in 2006.

Since the festival closed, the site has passed through the hands of a series of developers. From the late 1980s until its closure in 1996, the Festival Hall was used as the Pleasure Island amusement park. Half of the site has since been turned into residential housing. The Festival Hall dome was demolished in late 2006.

In November 2006 local companies Langtree and McLean announced plans for the site that will see more than 1,000 new homes built around the cleared dome area, as well as the restoration of the original gardens created for the festival in 1984.

== Liverpool Festival Gardens ==
In September 2009 it was announced that work would begin on redeveloping the site in November 2009, after the city council gave permission for work to begin. The redevelopment would see the Chinese and Japanese gardens being restored, as well as the lakes and associated watercourses and the woodland sculpture trails. Funding came from a range of sources, including the Northwest Regional Development Agency, who provided a £3.7million grant. Redevelopment work began in February 2010

In 2012, Liverpool Festival Gardens finally reopened. The restored garden site had been due to re-open in September 2011, however, this was delayed until 2012 whilst a new landscape management contractor was found after the original contractor, Mayfield Construction, went into administration. The garden site was managed by The Land Trust until 2017 at which time it reverted back to the control of Liverpool City Council.

The new restored site features:

- Two restored pagodas in the oriental gardens
- The restored Moon Wall
- New lakes, waterways and waterfalls
- New pedestrian access point linking to the promenade
- New secure parking area

In 2022 work was completed on a smaller refurbished car park as part of a project to create a new southern grasslands extension to the Festival Gardens. The completed Southern Grasslands area was opened on 7th August 2023 by Liverpool City Region Metro Mayor Steve Rotherham and Councillor Laura Robertson-Collins. The new site provides extensive elevated views across the Mersey River.

== New housing ==
In March 2013, the developers Langtree began work on the 1300 planned homes on the site, despite the earlier collapse of partner David McLean Homes. In 2017 Liverpool City Council took back control of the site and in 2018 appointed Ion and partner Midia as the development partner with City Council. Remediation works at the site to remove waste from the landfill was not completed until 2023 at which time the Council were in the process of seeking a new development partner.

== See also ==
- Seagaia Ocean Dome, similar dome structure
