= Ravenglass and Eskdale Railway locomotives =

List of the locomotives of the Ravenglass and Eskdale Railway

River Mite at Dalegarth

This article gives details of the locomotives used on the Ravenglass and Eskdale Railway, a 15 in (381 mm) narrow gauge preserved railway line running for 7 miles (11 km) from Ravenglass on the Cumbrian coast to Dalegarth near the village of Boot, in Eskdale.

== Steam locomotives ==
=== No. 1 Sans Pareil ===
The first 15 in (381 mm) gauge locomotive operated on the line, built by Bassett-Lowke of Northampton in 1912 as Prins Olaf for a railway in Christiania (now Oslo), Norway. It arrived for the line's opening in 1915 to Muncaster Mill. It was a Bassett-Lowke Class 30 4-4-2 locomotive and was painted in the dark blue livery of Narrow Gauge Railways. It was withdrawn from traffic in the mid-1920s and parts of it were incorporated into the River Mite of 1927. Its leading pony truck was reused under the rear of the Passenger Tractor of 1929 for many years. An identical locomotive, Synolda, now resides in the Ravenglass railway museum.

=== No. 2 Colossus ===
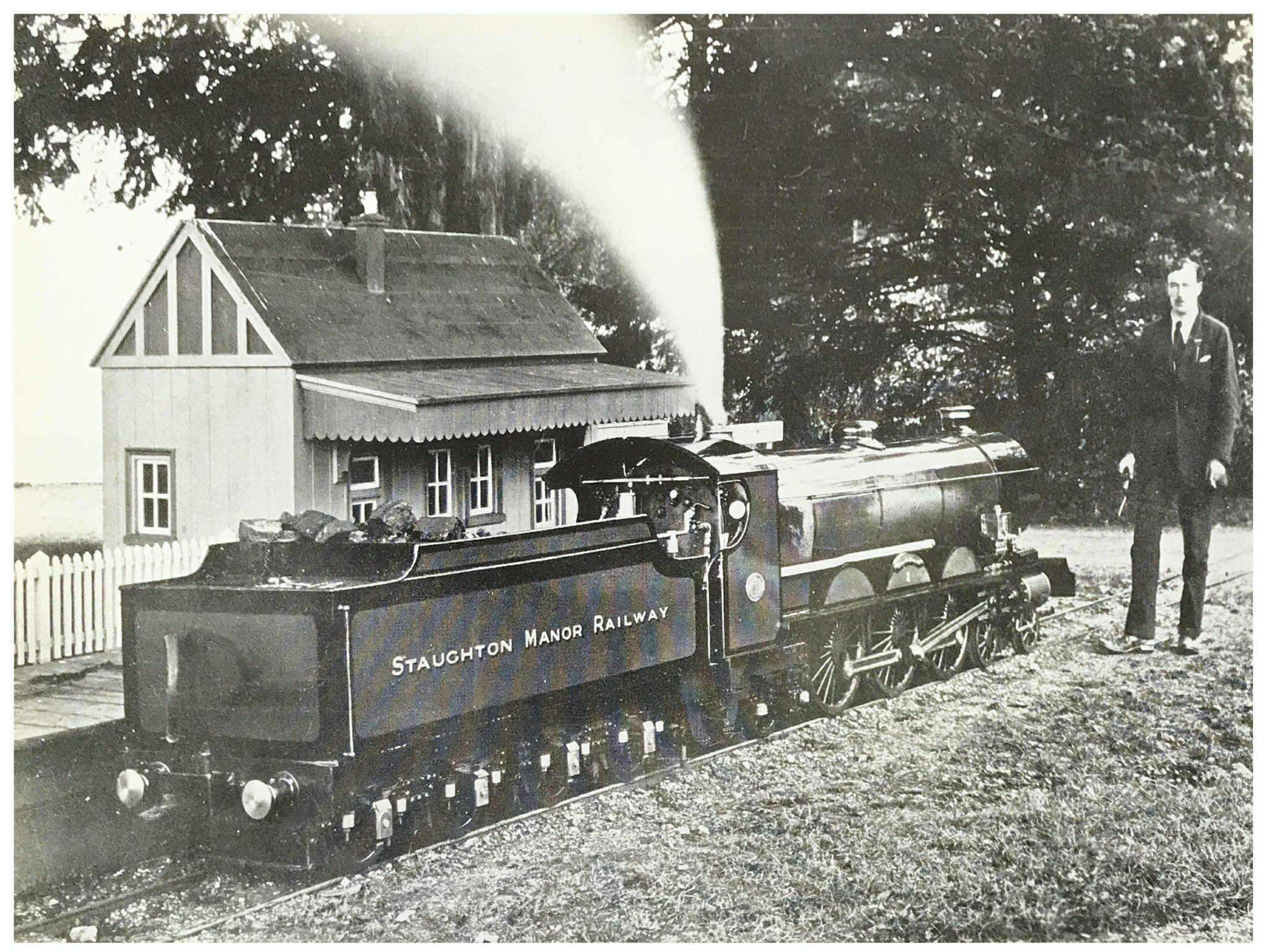
J. E. P. Howey at Staughton Manor in Huntingdonshire in 1914 with his 4-6-2 John Anthony (Colossus).

A Bassett-Lowke Class 60 4-6-2, built in 1913 for Captain JE Howey, later of Romney, Hythe and Dymchurch Railway fame, and named John Anthony. This was basically a Class 30 'Little Giant' with an extra pair of driving wheels. Howey had already run a 9½in. gauge line with a Bassett-Lowke GN 4-4-2 Atlantic which was returned in part exchange for this 15in. gauge locomotive. Although only one example of this type was ever built, Bassett-Lowke showed it in their 1911 catalogue priced at £425! It arrived at Ravenglass at the same time as Katie in 1916 and was nearly destroyed in a collision with Muriel in 1925. However, it ran after overhaul until 1927, when it was dismantled and utilised as part of the new River Mite 4-6-0-0-6-4 four-cylinder articulated locomotive.

=== No. 3 Muriel, then River Irt ===
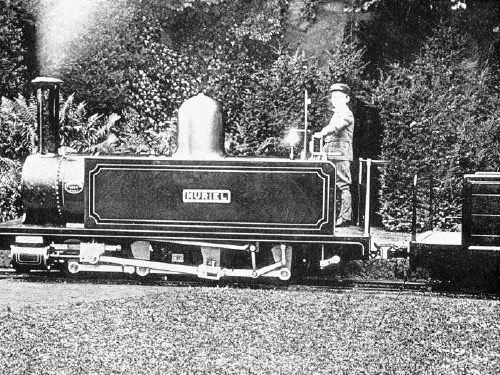
Muriel, whilst at the Duffield Bank Railway

==== Muriel ====
An 0-8-0T, constructed for the Duffield Bank Railway by Sir Arthur Heywood in 1894. Muriel incorporated a number of Heywood’s design ideas, including radiating/sliding axles and Heywood valve gear. After Sir Arthur’s death in 1916, Muriel was briefly owned by the Gretna munitions factory, before arriving at Ravenglass in 1917 along with Ella. She was principally used on goods traffic and later stone trains from Beckfoot quarry, but was also pressed into service on passenger trains during the peak summer season. She was withdrawn from service in 1927, and for a while was used as a stationary boiler at Beckfoot quarry, before being rebuilt as River Irt.

==== River Irt ====
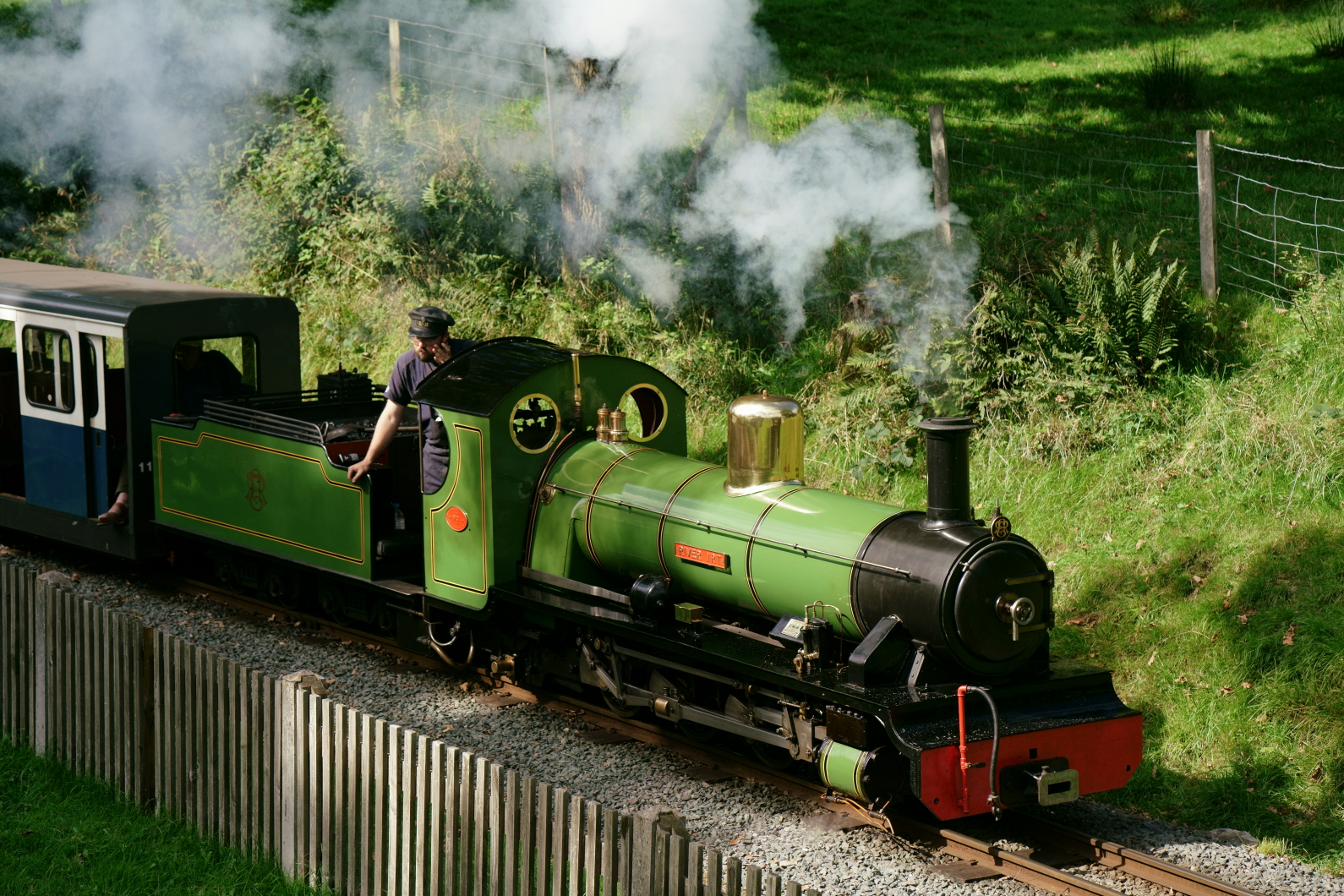
River Irt at The Green

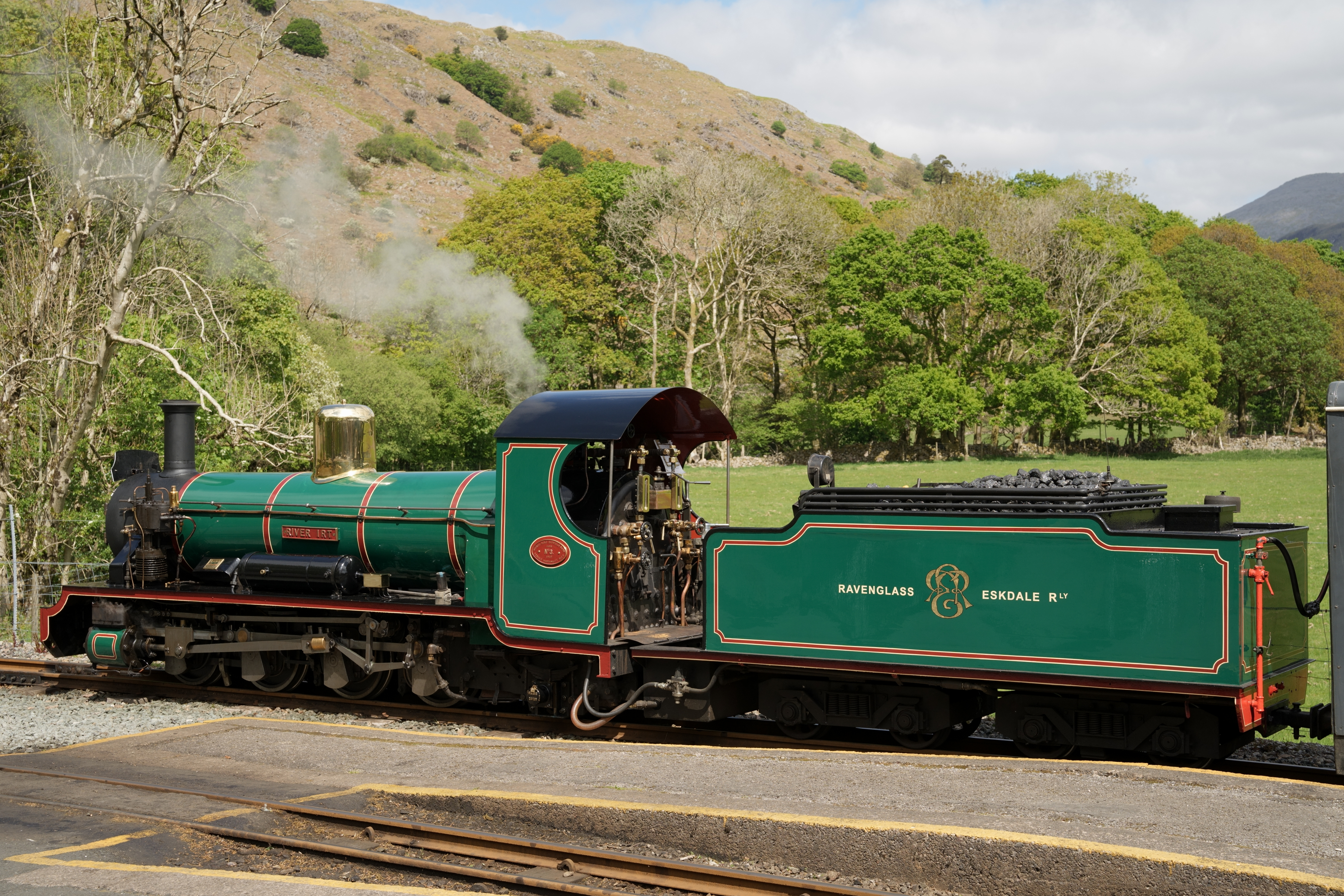
River Irt in its current livery at the 150th Anniversary Gala

After being withdrawn from service, Muriel was moved to Beckfoot quarry for use as a stationary boiler. However, it was found that her frames, cylinders and motion were still in good condition. It was therefore decided to rebuild her as a 0-8-2 tender locomotive for use on passenger trains. The rebuild was conducted at Murthwaite in 1927, with a frame extension added to the rear of her existing main frame to take the new set of trailing wheels and a larger firebox. A 6-wheel tender replaced her side tanks/coal bunker, and a 1/3 scale cab was added. This gave a somewhat squat appearance, but mechanically the rebuild was successful. Muriel re-entered service in 1928, and was renamed River Irt after one of the rivers that meets the sea at Ravenglass. River Irt has remained in traffic on passenger duties ever since (apart from being mothballed whilst passenger services were suspended during the Second World War), and is now the oldest working 15 in (381 mm) gauge locomotive in the world. In 1972 she was rebuilt with a new tender and a narrow gauge outline cab/funnel/dome, and was then re-boilered in 1977, giving the locomotive her current appearance.

She has visited the National Railway Museum in York and was part of the Ratty fleet at the Liverpool and Gateshead Garden Festival Railways in 1984 and 1990. The livery of the locomotive was for many years mid-green with yellow and black lining, however for the railway's 150th anniversary in 2025, the livery was updated to an approximation of Heywood green in reference to the locomotive's origins as Muriel.

River Irt briefly appears in animated form in the 1982 animated film The Plague Dogs, where the engine is seen pulling the train the two main characters use to escape from a group of soldiers hunting them.

River Irt was used as a basis for the character Bert in The Railway Series by the Rev. W. Awdry, first appearing in Small Railway Engines.

=== No. 4 Ella ===
Sir Arthur Heywood's 0-6-0T of 1881, built for his Duffield Bank Railway, it arrived with Muriel in 1917. Ten years later came the decision to convert the locomotive into an Internal Combustion machine, after years of regular use on granite trains from Beckfoot quarry. Its frames became part of ICL No. 2.

=== No. 5 Sir Aubrey Brocklebank ===
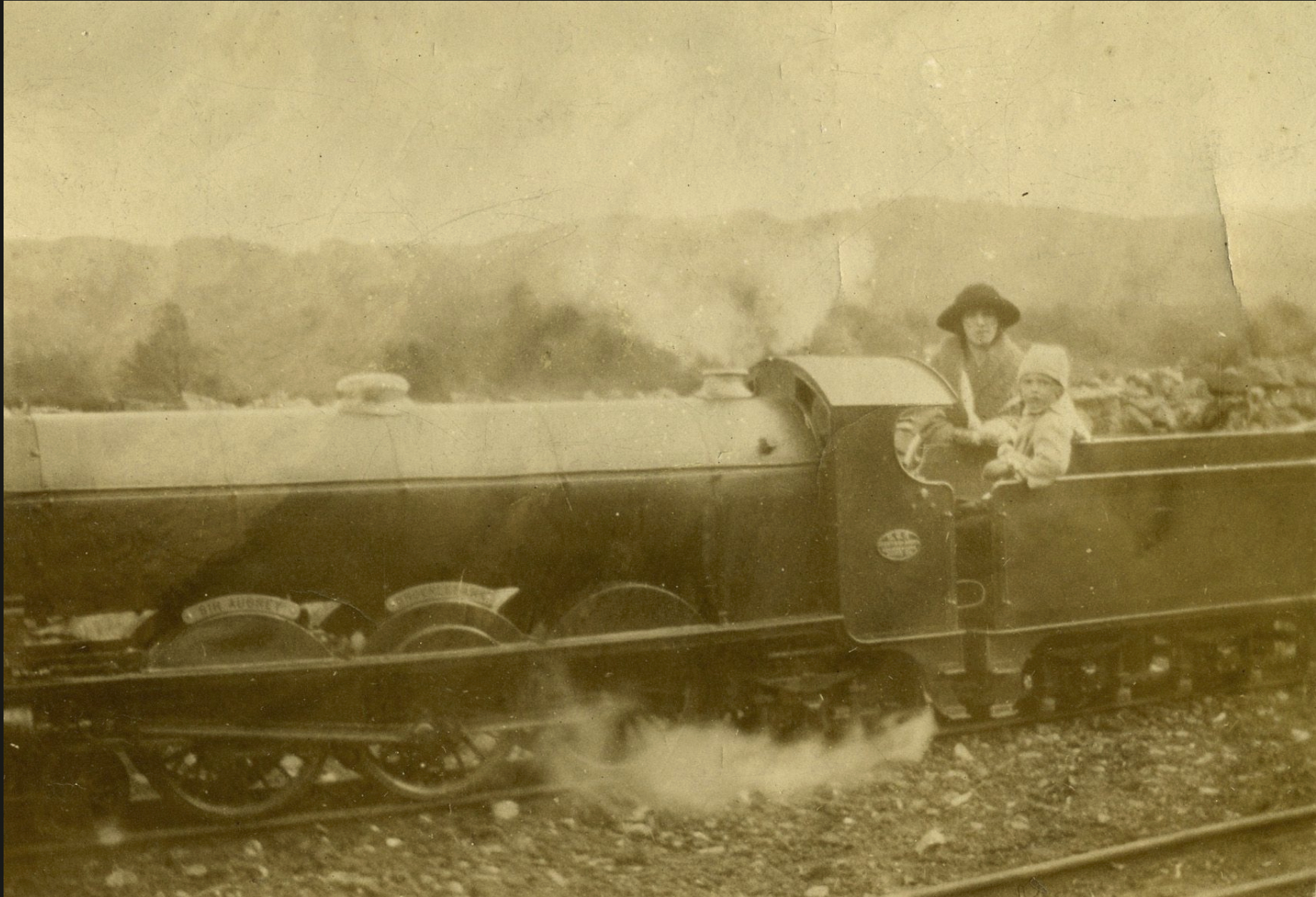
Sir Aubrey Brocklebank as pictured in the 1920s, with family from Bradford on holiday

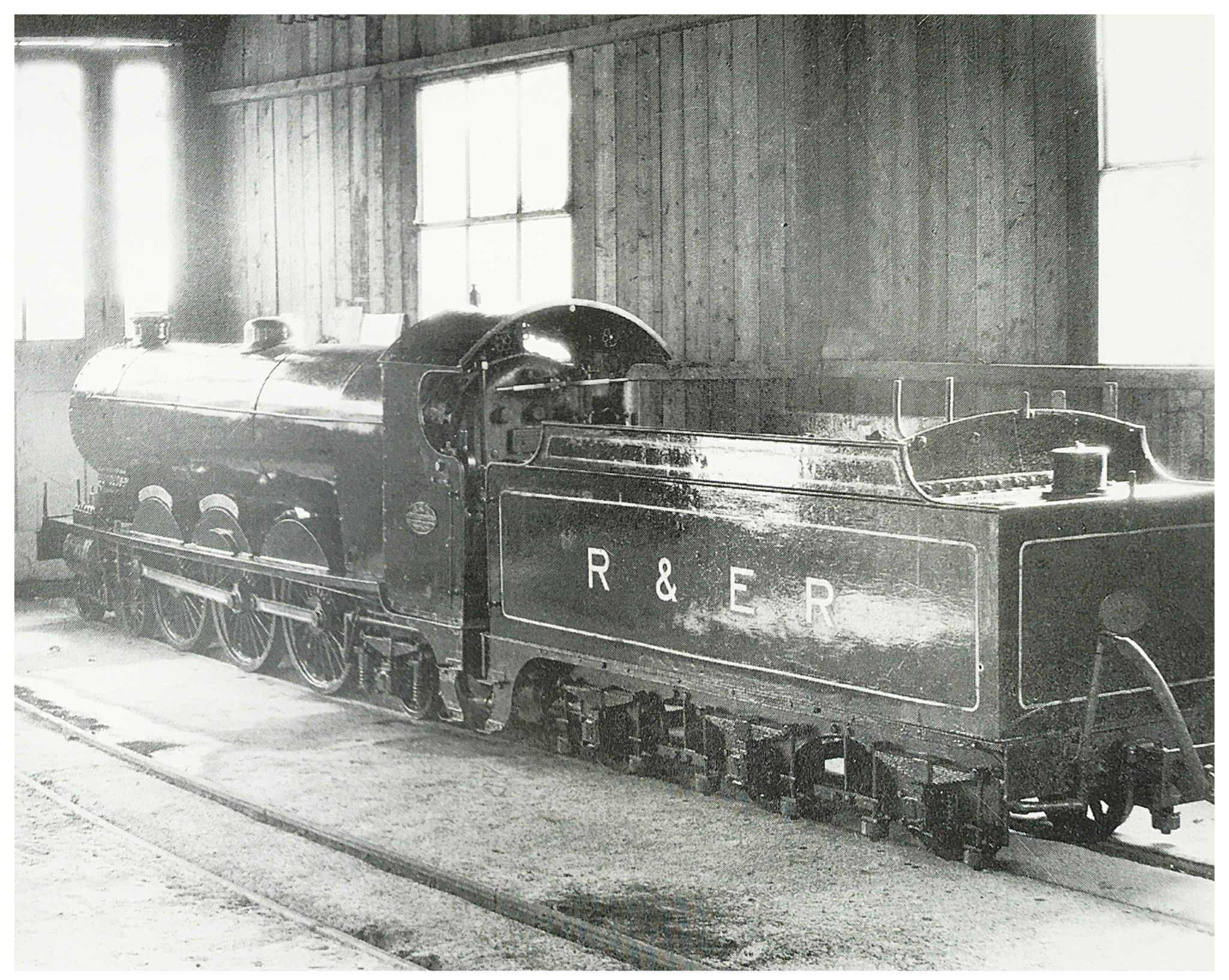
Sir Aubrey Brocklebank on shed in final livery.

A 4-6-2 tender locomotive, similar to Colossus, built by Hunt of Southampton in 1919. The engine became the railway's new flagship locomotive on passenger duties and replaced Sans Pareil in everyday usage. In 1927 the engine was dismantled and used in the construction of the new River Mite (I) locomotive, the running gear of the locomotive combined with that of Colossus gave the railway a new four-cylinder machine for the 1928 season.

=== No. 6 Katie ===
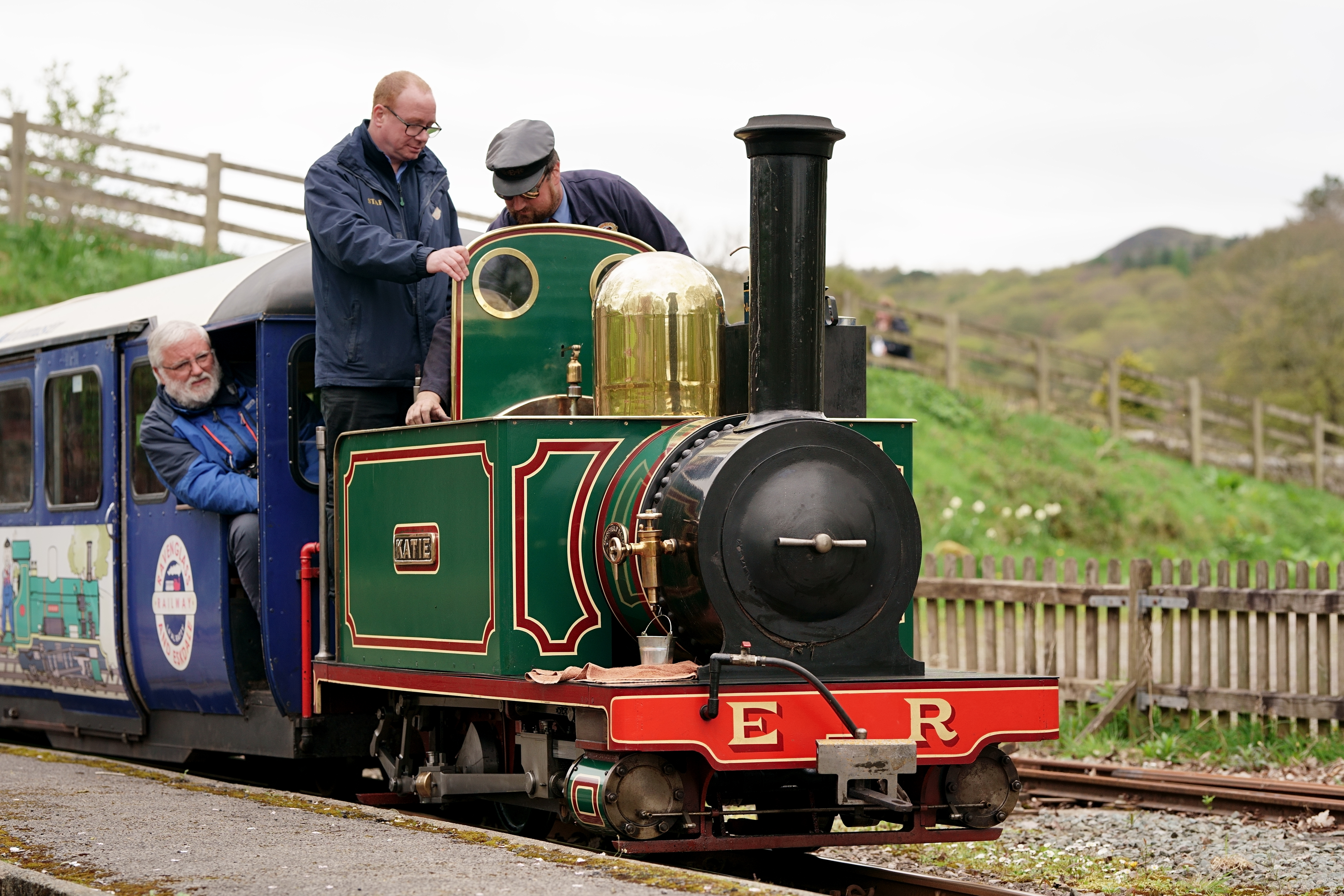
Katie at Irton Road with a short train

A 0-4-0T built by Sir Arthur Heywood in 1896 for the Duke of Westminster's Eaton Hall Railway. It came to Ravenglass in 1916 and left in 1919. Few photographs survive of it working in Cumbria, however the remains of the locomotive returned to the railway in 1982 after spells at Llewellyn's Miniature Railway, Southport and the Fairbourne Railway, Wales. In 1992, the R&ER Heritage Group formed, with an aim to restore the locomotive to original condition. After many years of fundraising and work, Katie’s rebuild was completed in 2017 by Station Road Steam, in Metheringham near Lincoln. She is usually on display in the railway’s museum at Ravenglass, but is frequently steamed for special events and 'driver for a fiver' days in the summer. She has also made several visits away from Ravenglass since her return to steam, including the Beamish Open Air Museum, the Fairbourne Railway, the Kirklees Light Railway, Romney, Hythe and Dymchurch Railway, Perrygrove Railway and Heatherslaw Light Railway.

=== No. 7 River Esk ===
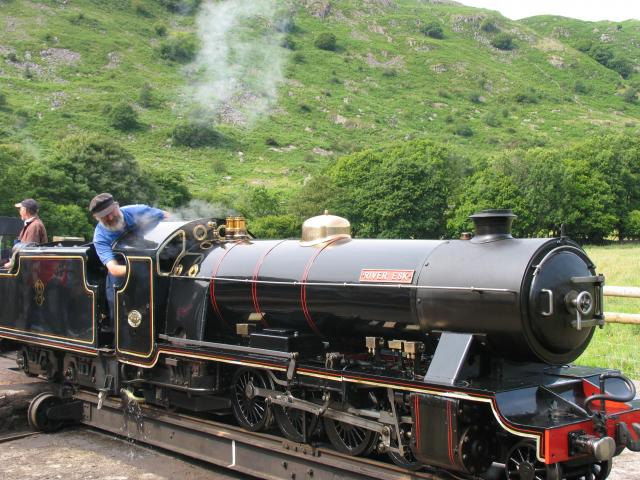
River Esk at Dalegarth

Built in 1923 as a 2-8-2 by Davey Paxman of Colchester and designed by Henry Greenly, River Esk is the predecessor to the Romney, Hythe and Dymchurch Railway's Greenly Pacific locomotives. It was named after a local river and was designed to haul both stone and passenger trains, however it soon found more use on passenger traffic. It was originally fitted with Lentz poppet valve gear, but this didn’t prove to be successful. It was painted works grey in 1924, then LMS red with black and straw lining to 1927. It was then repainted mid green with black and yellow lining during a rebuild in 1928 by the Yorkshire Engine Co, when the original valve gear was replaced with the current Walschaerts valve gear. At the same time, the loco received a Poultney steam tender, making the locomotive a 2-8-2-0-8-0. This proved unsuccessful and was soon removed, instead being utilised nearly forty years later as part of the second River Mite, after languishing at Murthwaite.

The locomotive was out of use from 1940 to 1952, survived into the preservation era and was repainted in a new livery of LNWR black in 1967 and received a new tender in 1970. In 1983, the Esk was fitted with a gas-producer boiler and received an award from British Coal, however this has been out of use since 2001. The locomotive has visited the Romney, Hythe and Dymchurch Railway several times. The engine is currently in Blackberry Black of the LNWR with red, off-white and black lining.

In 2013, River Esk was undergoing an overhaul in the workshop at Ravenglass when the facility was destroyed in a fire. Staff and volunteers managed to save the frames and some other components from the flames, but the majority of River Esk’s parts were damaged beyond repair. Following completion of the new workshop in 2015, River Esk was rebuilt at Ravenglass with a new tender based on the one provided for Whillan Beck, and improvements to her exhaust system along with other modernisations by Nigel Day. She returned to steam in 2018, and remains in regular service.

River Esk was used as a basis for the character Rex in The Railway Series by the Rev. W. Awdry, first appearing in Small Railway Engines.

=== No. 8 River Mite (I) ===
River Mite, in its original articulated form

The first River Mite was an articulated Kitson-Meyer locomotive built at Murthwaite in 1927, using the frames and running gear of Colossus and Sir Aubrey Brocklebank as the power bogies. She was used on both goods and passenger trains, but the worn out scale model frames proved to be too weak, and she was withdrawn from service in the late 1930s. It had been intended to rebuild her with stronger, purpose built power bogies, but the outbreak of the Second World War, and the subsequent post-war austerity, made this impossible. What remained of the locomotive was broken up during the 1950s.

=== No. 9 River Mite (II) ===
River Mite at Fisherground Halt, 2006

Using the former Poultney 0-8-0 tender chassis, fitted to River Esk from 1928 to 1931, the new Preservation Society in 1963 started fund raising and ordered it to be built into a 2-8-2 locomotive, which was designed and completed by Clarksons of York. It was delivered in December 1966 hauled by a traction engine called Providence, and commissioned on 20 May 1967. Its presence enabled the railway to operate a longer and more intensive summer service.

It is in many ways similar to the River Esk, using that loco's original 1923 coupled wheels in the Yorkshire Engine Company frames but different front and a rear Cortazzi truck, with a miniature main line outline styled on an LNER Gresley Class P1 locomotive and an LMSR Stanier tender. The cost was some £8,000, entirely raised by voluntary subscription as are all the major maintenance costs.

After heavy overhauls in 1977 and 2006/7, it celebrated its fortieth year at Ravenglass in 2007 owned by the R&ER Preservation Society. The locomotive was painted in the Indian Red of the Furness Railway, with yellow and black (now vermilion and black) lining, apart from a short period in cherry red from 1972 to 1977.

At the end of the 2019 operating season, River Mite was withdrawn for another major overhaul. The work was conducted at Old Hall Farm, Bouth, where she received a new tender and cab. She returned to Ravenglass in early 2021, and has since returned to passenger traffic.

River Mite was used as a basis for the character Mike in The Railway Series by the Rev. W. Awdry, first appearing in Small Railway Engines.

=== No. 10 Northern Rock ===
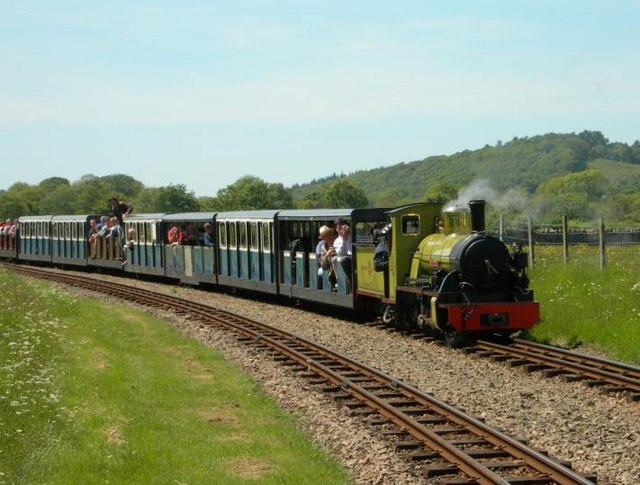
Northern Rock

With passenger numbers increasing in the early 1970s, the decision was taken by the railway company to acquire another steam loco to supplement the existing fleet. After undertaking trials with the Romney, Hythe and Dymchurch Railway No. 2, Northern Chief in 1972, it was decided that the new loco would be a 2-6-2 narrow gauge outline design to match the profile of the new closed saloons entering service on the railway, and incorporating the best features of a number of existing locomotives. The new loco would also be built onsite in the railway’s workshop at Ravenglass. Originally, the new engine was to be named Sir Arthur Heywood. After the railway received funding from the Northern Rock building society to support the construction of the new loco, it was instead decided to name the locomotive after its chief sponsor. It entered traffic in 1976, as part of the 100th anniversary celebrations of the railway’s opening to passengers.

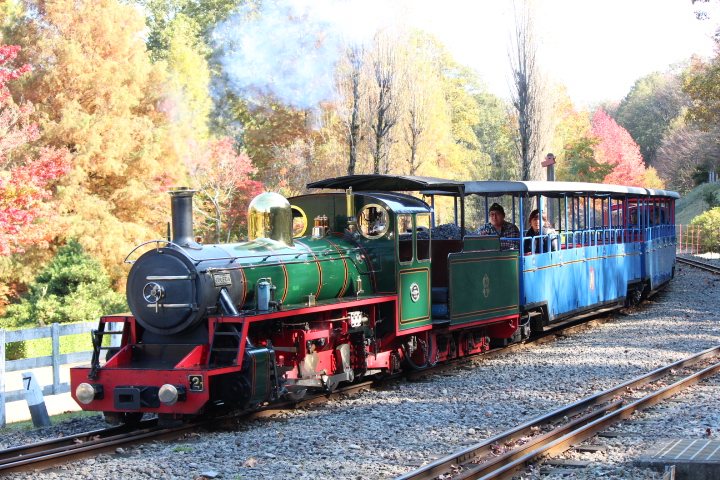
Cumbria on the Shuzenji Romney Railway

Northern Rock has since proved to be a reliable and powerful locomotive, and remains the flagship of the locomotive fleet at Ravenglass. The engine has visited several railways, including the 1990 Gateshead Garden Festival Railway, the Bure Valley Railway, and as far away as Dresden, Germany, to publicise the railway. Two similar locomotives were built at Ravenglass for the Shuzenji Romney Railway in Japan, Northern Rock II and Cumbria, in 1989 and 1992, respectively. The livery of the engine is Highland Railway Muscat Green with red and dark green lining.

In 2021, Northern Rock underwent a heavy overhaul at the workshops of John Fowler & Son Engineering, Old Hall Farm, Bouth. She returned to traffic at Ravenglass in 2023.

The original steam locomotive for the Miniature Railway ride in RollerCoaster Tycoon and RollerCoaster Tycoon 2 is modelled on Northern Rock.

Northern Rock was used as a basis for the character Jock in The Railway Series by the Rev. W. Awdry; first appearing in Jock the New Engine, which was written by Christopher Awdry.

=== No. 11 Bonnie Dundee ===
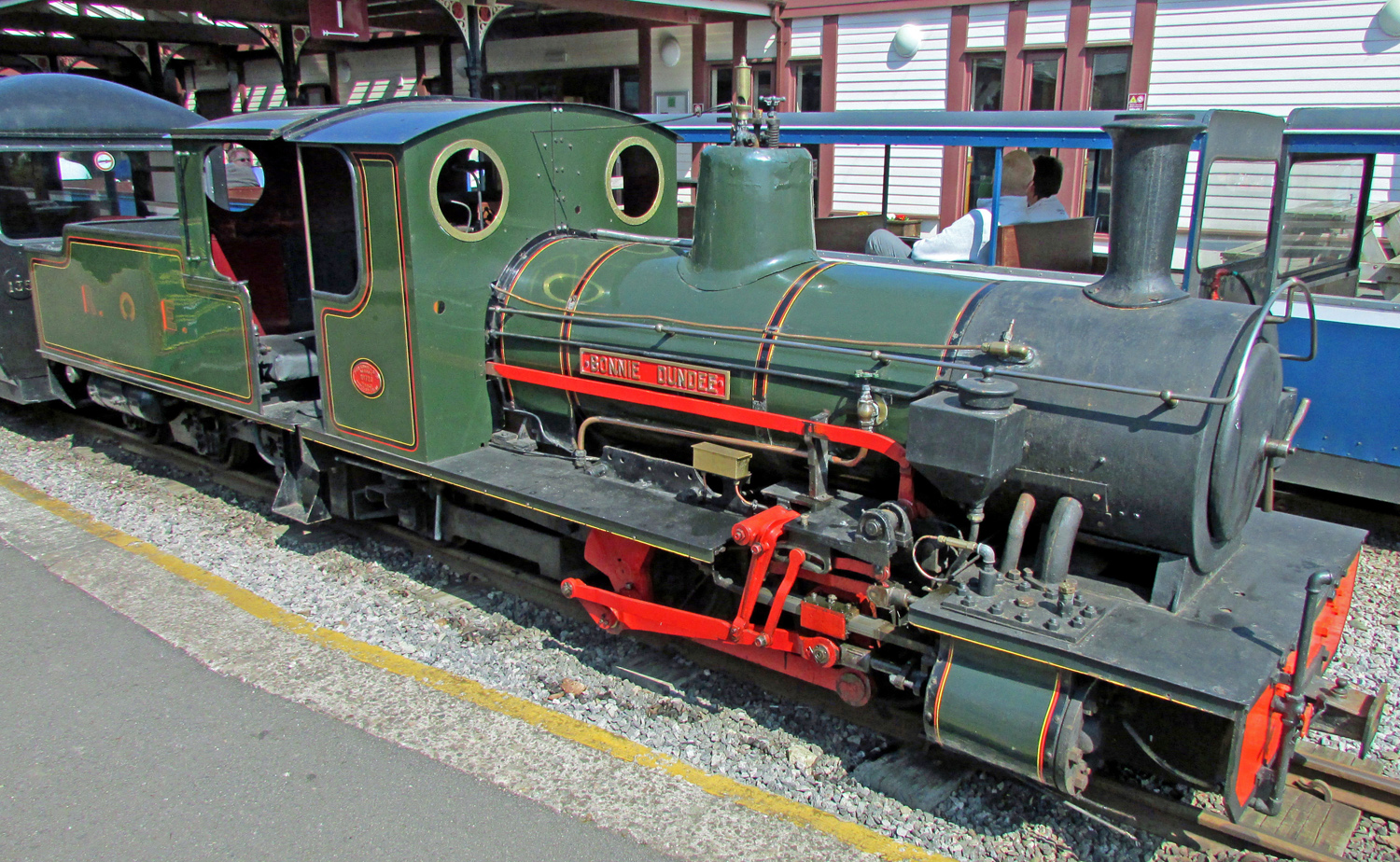
Bonnie Dundee exhibited in Ravenglass station in April 2015.

Originally a 2 ft (610 mm) gauge 0-4-0WT built by Kerr Stuart in 1900 for Dundee gasworks, the engine was bought by Ian Fraser around 1960 (who took his case to build a locomotive shed in his garden to the Secretary of State for Scotland) and donated to the railway in 1976. After a rebuild, it emerged as an 0-4-2T in 1982, with the side tanks from 'Ella', and was used on winter and other lighter trains. 1996 saw the locomotive rebuilt again with a new boiler and reversed Southern valve gear replacing the original inside Stephenson's valve gear, this time incorporating a tender.

It was withdrawn from traffic in 2005 awaiting an overhaul, and visited the Windmill Farm Railway in 2007–10 on static display. The engine was moved to the workshop at Old Hall Farm, Bouth, where it underwent restoration to working order.

Bonnie Dundee returned to steam in December 2020 and entered service on the Cleethorpes Coast Light Railway in May 2021. It remained there on long term loan until August 2025 when ownership of the locomotive was transferred to the CCLR permanently. It is painted in the Bronze Green livery of the North British Railway.

=== No. 12 Whillan Beck ===
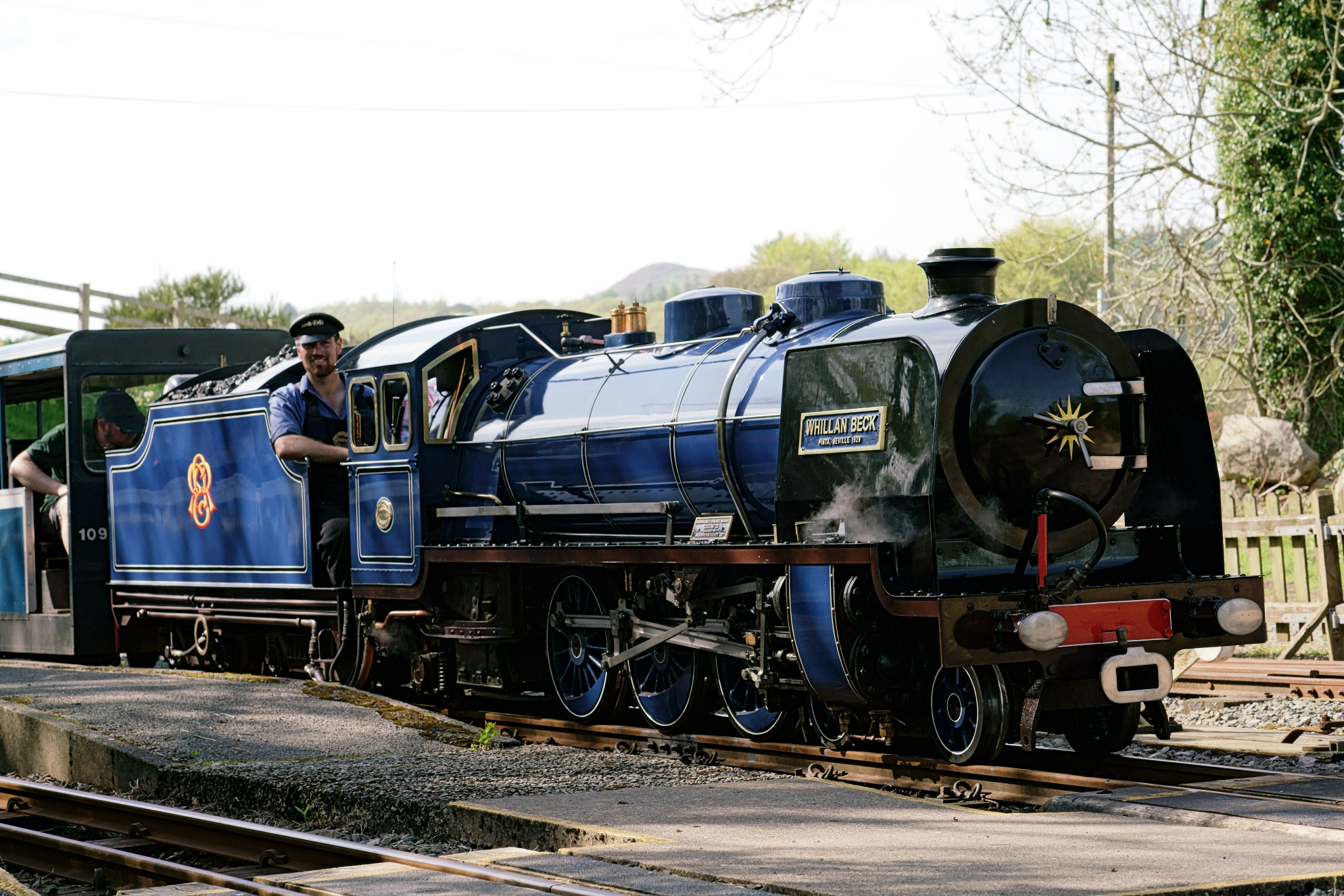
Whillan Beck

Built in 1929 at Krauss, Munich, works No. 8457, formerly named Pinta, is a 4-6-2 locomotive built to work at the Ibero-American Exposition of 1929. After operating there throughout the exposition, it was then used occasionally until 1932 before being placed in storage until the 1960s, when it was purchased along with its sister locomotives to run on a park railway in Madrid, though it is unknown if No. 8457 ever ran there. In the 2000s it was then purchased by a group intending to start up a railway in Barcelona, but this project never materialised and the locomotive remained in storage.

In 2015, the locomotive was purchased by the R&ERPS as part of the 'Train From Spain' Appeal and arrived in Cumbria in February 2016, with the chassis moving to Ravenglass later that month. The locomotive made its first moves under its own steam in November 2016, but required a new tender before it was able to enter service in March 2018. It was previously in crimson lake livery, though it has now been repainted in Caledonian Railway blue, as voted for by members of the R&ERPS. The members also voted to rename the locomotive Whillan Beck, after the river that passes under the line just short of the Dalegarth terminus.

=== Synolda ===
Sister locomotive to Sans Pareil, built in 1912 by Bassett-Lowke of Northampton for the Sand Hutton Miniature Railway. It arrived at the R&ER in 1978 and was restored to running condition in two years by apprentices from British Nuclear Fuels at the nearby Sellafield plant. It currently resides in Ravenglass museum, although the locomotive is in operational condition and appears in steam at special events. The livery is NGR Royal Blue.

=== The Flower of the Forest ===
An 0-2-2 vertical boilered tank engine, built for Ian Fraser of Arbroath in 1987. After Fraser's death in 1992, the engine returned to Ravenglass and operated during gala and "Thomas" events in the 1990s. During this time it was often housed in the shed at Irton Road station. The livery is that of the North Eastern Railway. It moved to the Cleethorpes Coast Light Railway on long term loan in 2016, remaining there until August 2025 when ownership was transferred to the CCLR permanently.

== Internal combustion locomotives ==
=== ICL No. 1 Bunny ===
A rebuild of a Crewe Tractor, a First World War rail-mounted Ford Model-T car with a 0-4-0 chain coupled wheel arrangement and a built-in turntable in order for it to change direction. It was used from 1923 to 1925 until the magneto broke the gearbox casing. The engine was rebuilt in 1926, with new running gear using the onetime Sand Hutton coach's bogie giving a 2-B petrol mechanical locomotive with a steeple cab wooden body. The locomotive in this form took and still holds the speed record for the line coming down from Dalegarth Cottages to Ravenglass driven by Cecil J Allan in some 14 minutes. This body lasted until October 1928, when it was damaged in a collision with ICL No. 2 near Muncaster Mill. The locomotive received its current body during extensive repairs. It continued in occasional use with light trains until the mid-1950s but was superseded as the other internal combustion locomotives used cheaper tax free TVO and could haul full length trains. It was operable until it had the engine removed in 1961 and became a toolvan or 'The Caboose' for the permanent way gang. It is now undergoing restoration to working condition with its Ford T engine.

=== ICL No. 2 ===
1927 saw the appearance of this 2-6-2 petrol mechanical locomotive, stemming from a Lanchester Model 38 touring car chassis mounted on the running gear components of Ella with the frames fitted to new cast stretchers. The engine and transmission from the Lanchester, worked a Parsons marine reverse box with chains to the rod final drive, within a teak body similar to that carried on ICL No. 1. It survived colliding with this locomotive in 1928 and was later withdrawn after pushing a big-end through the crank case the following year. It hauled passenger trains and the heaviest stone trains with equal ease but once the 4 ft 8 1/2 in (1,435 mm) standard gauge line to Murthwaite was constructed and the second Muir-Hill locomotive converted for running at passenger train speeds, ICL 2 lost its role and was never rebuilt. By the 1950s the frames and wheels still lay beside the line at Murthwaite.

=== NG 41 ===
Chronologically, NG 41 was the third of the Muir-Hill Fordson tractors to be acquired by the railway. It was built in 1929 in Manchester and bought by the railway in order to haul stone trains between Beckfoot Quarry, Murthwaite Crushing Plant and Ravenglass. After 1953, when the quarry closed, NG 41 was cannibalised for parts like the worm gearing for the other two Fordson locomotives. The chassis lay at Murthwaite until it was scrapped in early 1972, however the wheels were used in the regauging of Bonnie Dundee.

=== ICL No. 4 Passenger Tractor, then Perkins ===
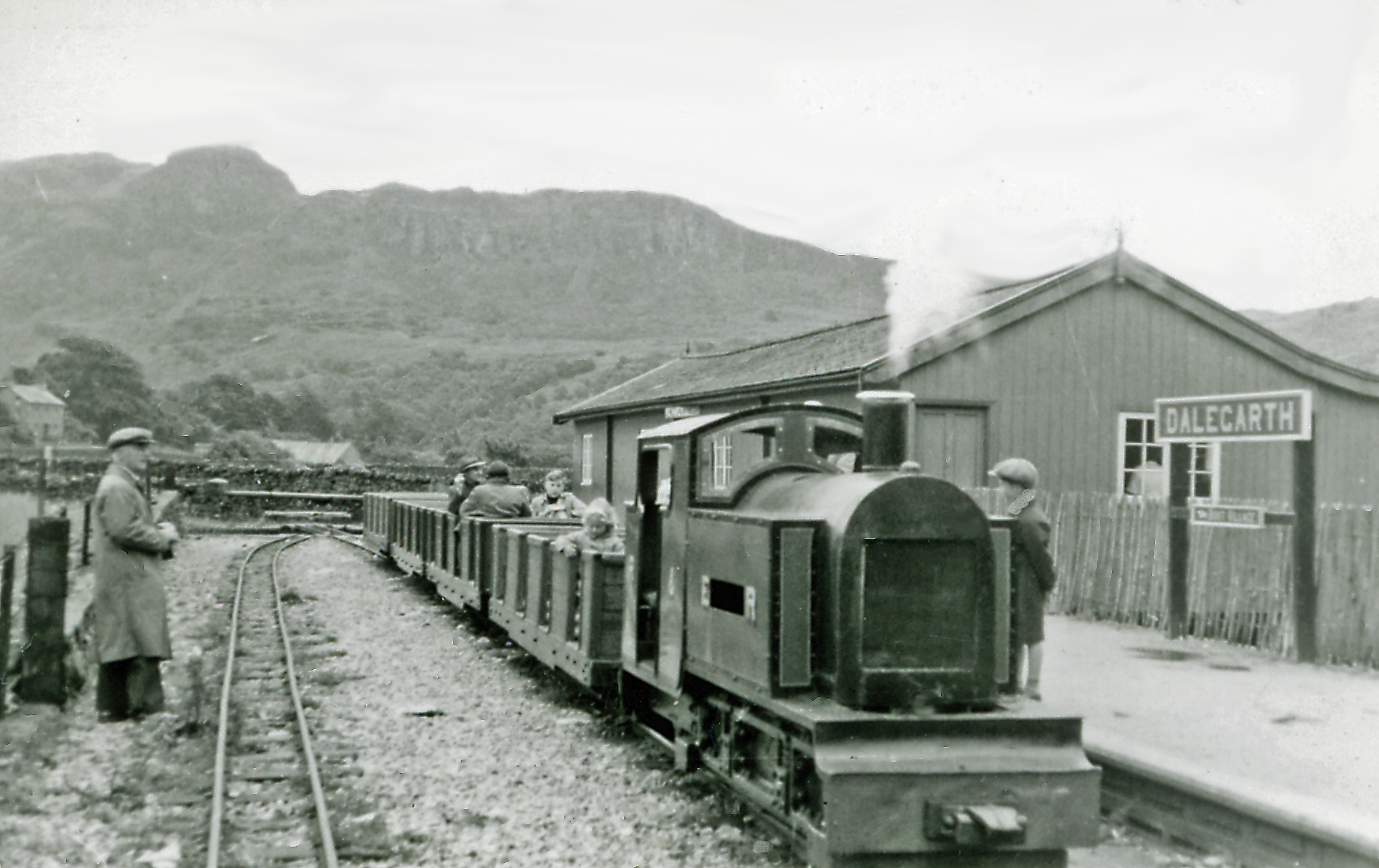
Petrol/TVO (mechanical)'0-4-4', No.4 'Passenger Tractor' with fake steam outline 12 August 1951.

NG 39 was the second Muir-Hill Fordson tractor to be bought by the railway for quarry traffic. It arrived in 1929, three years after the original tractor, and was rebuilt as a steam-outline Diesel 0-4-4 using the front bogie off Sans Pareil in 1933 for occasional use on passenger trains. In this guise it was known as the Passenger Tractor and in the 1970s nicknamed Pretender.

It worked through the war and handled the first passenger services after the end of the conflict in May 1945. In 1975 the hand crank started petrol/TVO (tractor vaporising oil) engine was replaced with a Perkins P6 Diesel, giving the locomotive a modern radiator grill at the front. In 1984, the locomotive was rebuilt again, however this time it lost its fake steam outline and became an 0-4-2 similar to an industrial Diesel shunter. It was named Perkins in 1985 and was given a twin-disc transmission in 1990 reverting to an 0-4-4.

Its main use is on permanent way trains being capable of slow speed work for flail mowing and weed killing. It is currently painted yellow and black.

=== No. 5 Quarryman ===
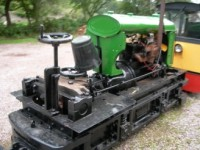
Quarryman

The first Muir-Hill quarry tractor arrived in 1926 for use on the granite traffic but was used on passenger trains on busy days. It gained an open-backed enclosed cab. In 1953 it exchanged components with NG 41. It was for a time used on relief passenger services with the Passenger Tractor until Shelagh of Eskdale was upgraded in 1975. Up until 1979 it was used regularly on works trains and has now been restored to original condition and is part of the Museum Collection. Its last scheduled passenger run was a special for the Cumbrian Railways Association in 1979, although it has operated informal after-hours specials on occasion since. Looked after by the Murthwaite Locomotive Group, it is currently operational and saw usage on permanent way duties, specifically ballast trains, in winter 2007.

=== No. 6 Royal Anchor ===
An experimental B-B Diesel hydraulic locomotive acquired by the railway in 1961 from the Romney, Hythe & Dymchurch Railway, who had trialled it and found it not powerful enough. It was built in 1956 by Charles Lane of the Royal Anchor hotel in Hampshire. It used a Ford 4D engine and a hydraulic drive, reputedly using parts from naval gun turrets, and could haul three full open bogie coaches but struggled with four. Without brakes other than putting the transmission into reverse, its ability to stop was limited until it could operate with the first R&ER air braked coaches around 1973. It was out of use in 1968 after failing to stop for cows on the crossing at Muncaster Mill. Nevertheless, it otherwise gave good service on the overnight and first morning round trip trains.

In the high summer season of 1975 it double headed Shelagh of Eskdale when the latter was incapable of hauling a heavy train. It was superseded by the completion of the Silver Jubilee railcar in 1977. In 1978 it was sold to Steamtown, Carnforth. However, after this railway closed to the public, it was sold to American film director Francis Ford Coppola in 2000 for use on a railway in one of his Californian vineyards. The engine first went to the Golden Gate Railroad Museum for repairs. The locomotive is currently in storage on the Coppola estate.

=== No. 7 Shelagh of Eskdale ===
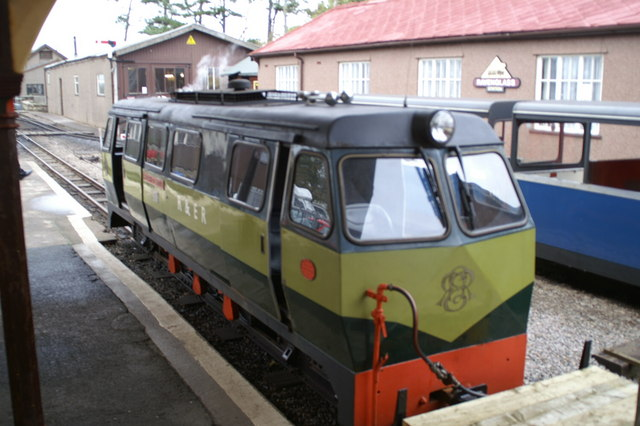
Shelagh of Eskdale

Tom Jones' Diesel was a 4-6-4 diesel-hydraulic locomotive partially built by Heathcotes of Cleator Moor in 1956–7. The running gear utilises parts from Ella, specifically the crankwebs (5 of 6 originals survive) and centre drum of the sliding axle, as a repair for accountancy purposes. Unusually for a diesel locomotive, the driven axles are linked by coupling rods like a steam locomotive. When the line was up for sale the construction was put on hold. However, in 1969 the chassis were sent away to Severn-Lamb of Stratford-on-Avon for completion to a design by David Curwen. Originally the engine was a Ford 4D, as in Royal Anchor, and had a Linde hydrostatic transmission that suffered cavitation problems on hot days of constant operation; this transmission was upgraded and the engine was replaced in 1975 by a Perkins 6/354.

In September 1981, the locomotive went to the Romney, Hythe and Dymchurch Railway to work the school train services during the building of that railway's own mainline Diesel locomotive John Southland. Shortly after its return to Ravenglass in 1983, it went briefly to Britannia Park, then to the International Garden Festival railway at Liverpool from March until October 1984, hauling HM Queen Elizabeth on the Opening Day. Subsequently it also operated at the Gateshead Garden Festival from February to October 1990.

In 1998, the engine was rebuilt into a diesel-mechanical locomotive when it gained a Ford industrial engine with Spicer Compact Shuttle transmission. It is currently a mixed traffic engine and used throughout the year. Its livery was originally blue with a silver roof, but has been two-tone green of various shades since 1978.

It is currently on long term loan to the Romney, Hythe and Dymchurch Railway due to their mainline diesels both needing major work.

=== Silver Jubilee ===
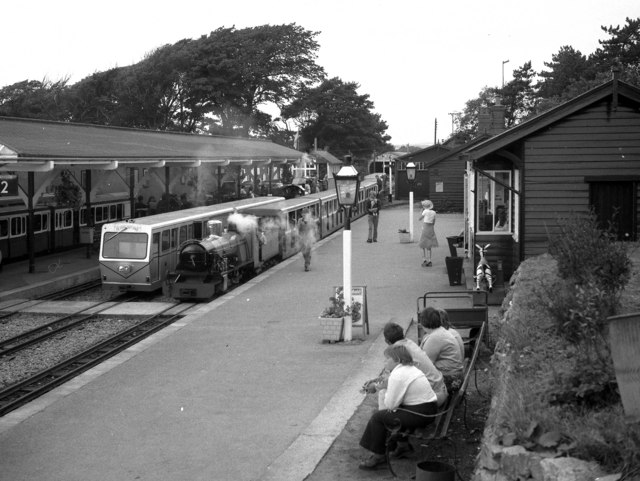
Silver Jubilee and Northern Rock at Ravenglass

The Silver Jubilee railcar was a set of coaches which first appeared in an embryonic stage in September 1976 as a single coach fitted with the Ford D engine and Linde transmission formerly in Shelagh of Eskdale, and centreless bogies. The three-car unit was named and launched in May 1977 at the inauguration of the railway's radio control system, the extra coaches being a driving trailer with air throttle controls at the Ravenglass end and a piped centre coach, which was later modified as a saloon for wheelchair access. The original livery was silver with the official Queen's Silver Jubilee vinyl badges used on buses, and later a blue line.

During its operating lifetime, the set was first used on a shuttle service from Ravenglass to the newly opened Muncaster Mill, and then largely on the first morning round trip and "overnight" trains, the latter throughout the winter. Although geared for speed, a timed run of 17 minutes in special conditions from Dalegarth to Ravenglass in November 1979 could not break the end-to-end line speed record held by ICL No. 1, from forty years before.

The original powercars were fitted with automatic gearboxes with electric direction control and air for throttle in 1983, followed both end driving coaches in early 1984. In 1984 the unit went to the Liverpool Garden Festival Railway, with an extra semi-open coach added in the middle of the formation. For this event it carried the BR InterCity Executive livery, the first vehicles in the country to do so after the concept coach, using the official BR paint. In subsequent years this livery saw detail changes as the main line HST livery evolved.

After the school train, overnight and winter services stopped in 2001, Silver Jubilee lost its particular role. Latterly repainted in FirstGroup 'Barbie' blue and pink/white striped livery, it was finally withdrawn after a trial visit as a 2-car unit to the Cleethorpes Coast Light Railway in 2003, and has now been completely converted into locomotive hauled coaching stock. The centre saloon remains disabled saloon number 123, the centre semi-open number 126 was rebuilt to a disabled saloon with new structure under the old roof, the driving trailer is now saloon 136 and the driving car has been converted into disabled saloon 137.

=== No. 8 Lady Wakefield ===
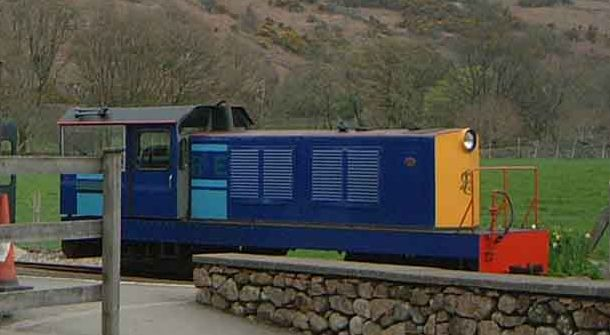
Lady Wakefield at Dalegarth

Lady Wakefield, known colloquially as Doris, is a B-B diesel-mechanical locomotive completed at Ravenglass in 1980 and designed by Ian Smith, the railway's chief engineer at the time, based on a layout proposal by Neil Simpkins for the Romney, Hythe & Dymchurch Railway. It was built with a 112 bhp Perkins 6/354 engine, identical to that in Shelagh of Eskdale at the time. The engine has a Twin Disc gearbox and driveshafts to each end, along with chain-coupled wheels in centreless bogies.

Shortly after commissioning in August 1980, the engine went to New Romney to prove Diesel traction was capable of handling the required loads and speeds on the RH&DR. The cab had been made to fit through that line's restricted loading gauge under the Littlestone Road tunnel. While at Romney, Lady Wakefield showed that a single diesel locomotive was capable of pulling the heavy sixteen coach school train. It became the basis for their two diesel locomotives, John Southland and Captain Howey, built by TMA Engineering with a heavier slab frame and shaft coupled wheels, and the John Southland II, built for Shujenji in Japan and trialled at Ravenglass in 1989. The engine was also used as the template for a smaller 12 in (305 mm) gauge Diesel, Lady of the Lakes for the Ruislip Lido Railway, that was also constructed at Ravenglass.

It was named by the wife of Lord Wavell Wakefield and used on permanent way duties throughout the year and passenger work in the summer. It was originally painted maroon with yellow, later with various bright red stripes, then blue with yellow ends and DRS styled motifs, and currently carries British Railways Brunswick Green livery with small yellow warning panels, similar to a British Rail Class 20.

=== Greenbat ===
Greenbat, also known as U2, is one of many battery electric locomotives that were built in Leeds by Greenwood & Batley. This particular engine was built in 1957 for Thomas Marshall & Co. of Storrs Bridge Fireclay Mine in Yorkshire. Its builder’s number is 2872 and was originally built to an unusual gauge of 16 in (406 mm). When the mine closed, the engine was brought to Ravenglass in 1982, where the wheels were re-profiled to the Ratty's gauge and then became a versatile engine with which to shunt coaching stock. It awaits refurbishment at Ravenglass.

=== No. 9 Cyril ===
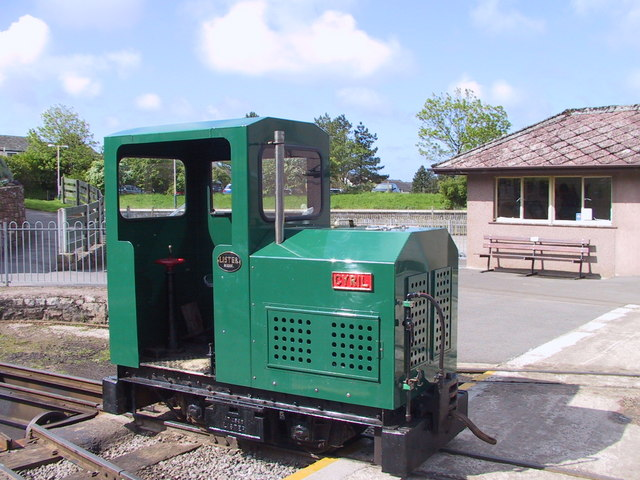
Locomotive ICL 9 "Cyril".

Named after former company employee, Cyril Holland, Cyril was formerly named Shabtrak, and is one of many industrial narrow gauge diesels built by R.A. Lister. It was built in 1932, used on a peat bog railway not far from Manchester and first preserved at the Moseley Railway Trust, in Stockport, in its original form of an open sided cab and on 2 ft (610 mm) gauge. When the engine arrived on the R&ER in 1985, the volunteers for refurbishing Shabtrak used parts from another Lister locomotive and a 2-cylinder, 12 horsepower (8.9 kW) Lister engine to rebuild it to 15 in (381 mm) gauge. At the same time they fitted a new cab and bonnet, in the style of a Lister Blackstone RM2. The engine now has full electrical, radio and air brake systems for working light passenger trains in emergencies and in 1989 was re-engined with a 20 h.p. Lister engine to improve performance. It was rebodied in 2006 by Ian Page Engineering of Millom. It is currently painted dark green, and is owned by the Murthwaite Locomotive Group.

=== Blacolvesley ===
Owned by Dr. Bob Tebb, Blacolvesley is the oldest workable internal combustion locomotive in the world. It was built by Bassett-Lowke in 1909 utilising parts of Henry Greenly's Class 10 Atlantic locomotives. Originally, it was fitted with a NAG 12/14 h.p. engine, which was later replaced with an Austin 8 engine at Saltbur. However, the original transmission, gearbox and bevel drive all remain in use. It was built for Charles Bartholomew for the Blakesley Miniature Railway at Blakesley Hall, but the engine has had a varied history since leaving there in 1939. It was later named "Elizabeth" and was kept on the railways at Saltburn, Haswell Lodge and Lightwater Valley up until 1994, although had been inoperable since the mid-1970s. When it arrived at Ravenglass, it was successfully restarted and operated in August 1994. It is now painted in its original colours once again and operated at gala events. The locomotive celebrated its 100th birthday in 2009 and has been on static display at the Railway Museum at Cleethorpes from 2010 to present.

=== No. 10 Les ===
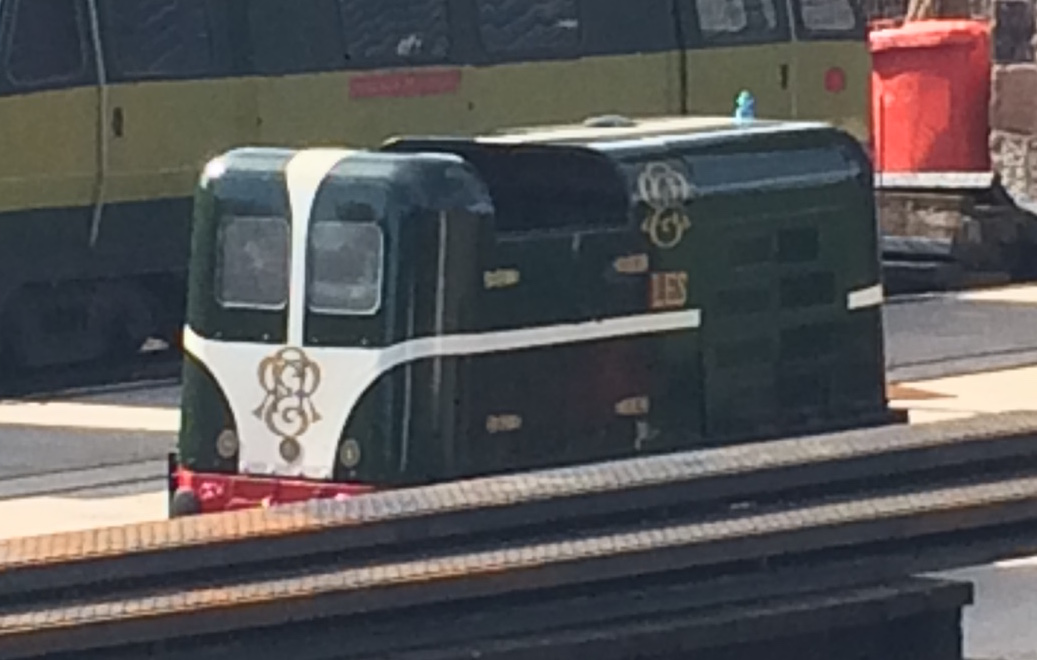
Locomotive ICL 10 "Les".

Les is a unique Lister Diesel locomotive – the only 15 in (381 mm) gauge locomotive constructed as such by R.A. Lister – built in 1960 for Mr. J. Lemon-Burton, of West Sussex. When he died, the engine went to the Bredgar and Wormshill Light Railway in Kent. Here it gained the number 21 and the present name and livery. The engine's top speed is 7 mph (11 km/h) and is used by the fitters for minor shunting activities in the confines of Ravenglass station. It is currently in Lister dark green with cream stripes at one end.

=== No. 11 Douglas Ferreira ===
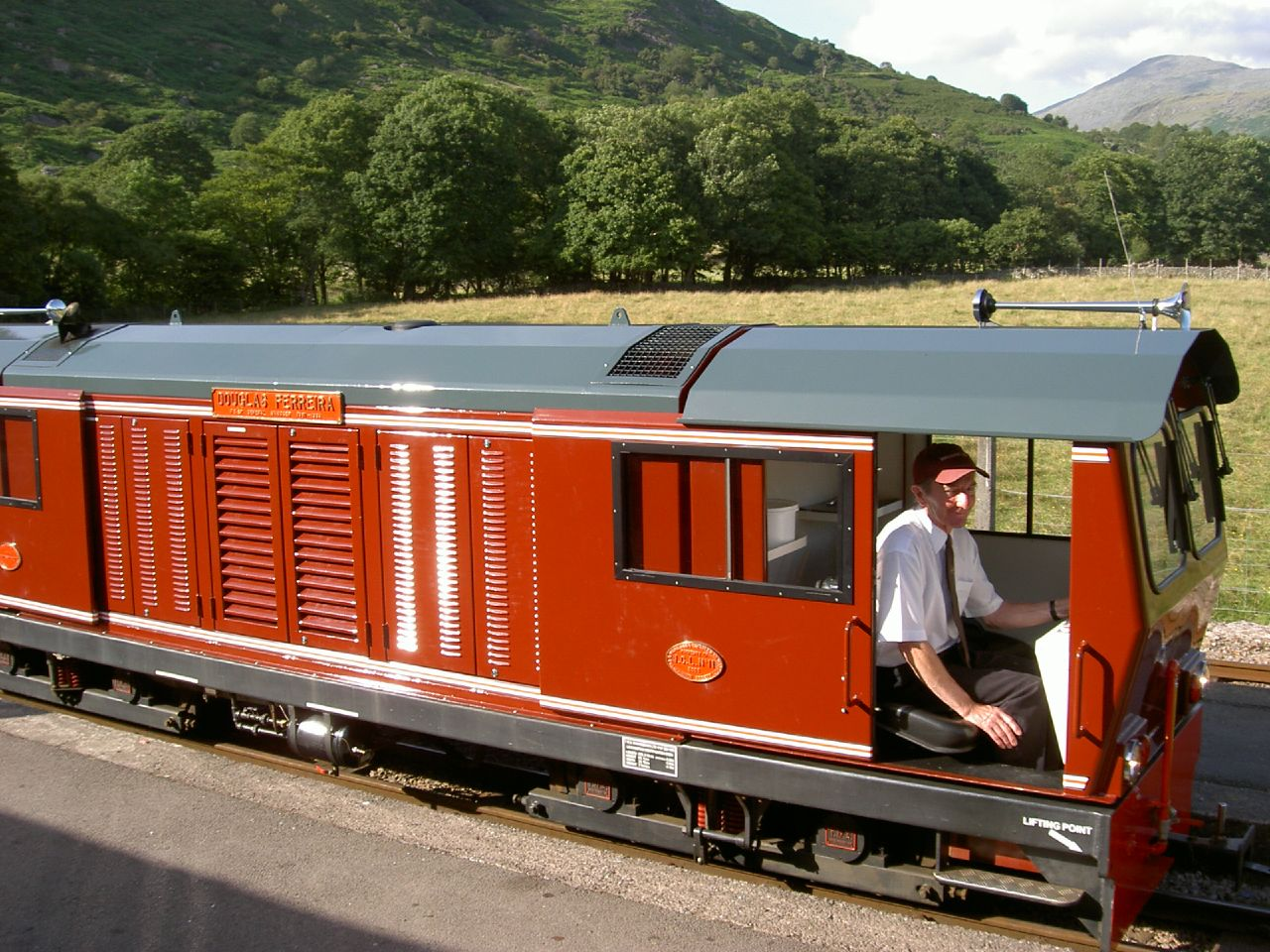
Douglas Ferreira

In July 2004, the R&ER Preservation Society placed an order with TMA Engineering of Birmingham for a new B-B Diesel hydraulic locomotive, that was to be funded by the Society. It was delivered the following year and named after the recently deceased former General Manager, Douglas Ferreira. It is a diesel-hydraulic locomotive, with a Perkins 4-cylinder turbocharged engine, which is more compact yet even more powerful than that on Lady Wakefield, and is essentially a development of the quarter-century elder loco. The running gear with shaft coupled wheels is similar to the Romney Diesels but inset with footwells at each end of the steel slab frame.

The engine has proved to be a great success, using a modern low-emissions power unit with complete reliability. It has been in almost daily service since its commissioning and is easy to operate, service, and maintain. It is leased by the society to the company, carrying a Furness Railway Indian Red livery matching that on the Preservation Society's other locomotive, River Mite. It operated at the Bure Valley Railway gala in September 2009.

== Three-foot gauge locomotives ==
For the construction of the railway by Ambrose Oliver, the "Contractor's locomotive" was noted in reports in the Whitehaven News at work in late 1874 but its identity and its subsequent history has never been determined.

For the opening of the 3 ft (914 mm) gauge line to goods in May 1875 an 0-6-0 tank locomotive was obtained from Manning Wardle. Its works number was 545 and it was named Devon. A second locomotive of the same design followed in October 1876 before the line opened to passengers. This was Manning Wardle works number 629, named Nabb Gill [sic]. The design was a "3 ft Special" developed from designs for Russia from 1871, and repeated for the Malta Railway from 1880.

The two Manning Wardle locomotives handled all traffic on the railway prior to the re gauging to 15-inch gauge in 1915. Both had heavy repairs one at a time at the Lowca Engine Works around 1892–5, with the fitting of Westinghouse air brake equipment and new smokeboxes. The smoke box doors and air pump positions were different between the two locos, aiding identification of them in later photos. By the early 1900’s, parts would be swapped between the locos to keep at least one in service (in 1905 a derailment at Murthwaite halt involved a locomotive with the boiler from Nabb Gill and the side tanks of Devon), but only Devon was working during the later years to the end of 3 ft (914 mm) gauge services in April 1913. Both locomotives were gone, presumed scrapped, by late 1915.

== Standard gauge locomotives ==
In December 1929, a 4 ft 8 1/2 in (1,435 mm) standard gauge 0-6-0 diesel locomotive was obtained to work the Ravenglass-Murthwaite section. It was built by Kerr Stuart (works number 4421) and had a six-cylinder, 90 horsepower (67 kW), McLaren-Benz engine. Transmission was mechanical and final drive was by roller chains. In 1955 it was sold, through a dealer, to the National Coal Board for use at Wingate Grange Colliery, Durham. A new Dorman engine of 90 horsepower (67 kW) was fitted in 1960. It is now preserved at the Foxfield Light Railway, restored to original external condition, and was displayed at Ravenglass in the summer of 2000. In 2022 it was restored to running order and fitted with vacuum brake to run passenger trains. It visited Middleton Railway in 2023

An unidentified standard gauge Muir-Hill locomotive was also noted at Murthwaite around 1954.

== Bibliography ==
- Davies, W.J.K. (1981). The Ravenglass & Eskdale railway. David & Charles. ISBN 0715392247.
- Hartley, Kenneth E. (1982). The Sand Hutton light railway. Narrow Gauge Railway Society. ISBN 095071691X.
- Heywood, Arthur Percival (1974) [1898]. Minimum Gauge Railways (3rd ed.). Turntable Publications. ISBN 0-902844-26-1.
- Household, Humphrey (1995). Narrow gauge railways: England and the fifteen inch. Leicester: P R C. ISBN 1856481786.
- Mosley, David; van Zeller, Peter (1986). Fifteen Inch Gauge Railways. David & Charles. ISBN 0-7153-8694-8.
- Williams, Peter (1972). Rails from Ravenglass: a pictorial study of "La'al Ratty". Dalesman. ISBN 0852061323.
