= TMA Engineering =

Engineering business in the West Midlands

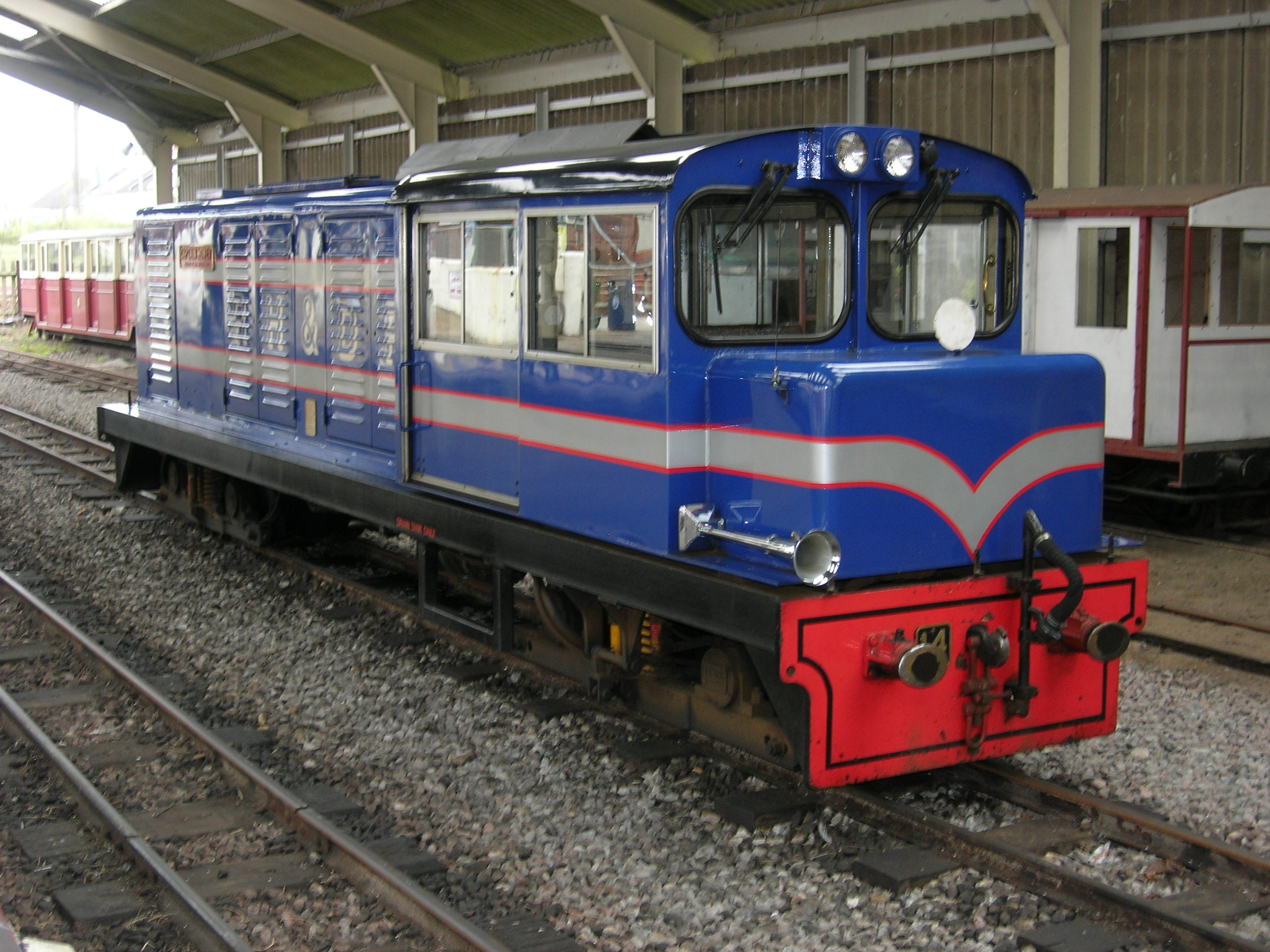
TMA 2336 Captain Howey at New Romney on the RH&DR.

TMA Engineering Ltd, is an engineering business based in Erdington, West Midlands, who supply services around power presses, but are best known for their sideline in building and overhauling miniature steam locomotives.

Most of the railway work that they undertake is in the 7¼" gauge, but they have also overhauled several 15" gauge locomotives, and have built five substantial 15" gauge diesel locomotives. The Romney, Hythe and Dymchurch Railway in Kent has two TMA 15" gauge diesels, Captain Howey and John Southland; The Ravenglass and Eskdale Railway in Cumbria has one, Douglas Ferreira and the Shuzenji Romney Railway in Japan has two, John Southland II and City of Birmingham. One of the latest projects that the company was to undertake has been the overhauling of the R&ER steam locomotive River Mite over the Winter of 2006/07.
