= Murthwaite Halt railway station =

Railway station in Cumbria, England

Murthwaite Halt
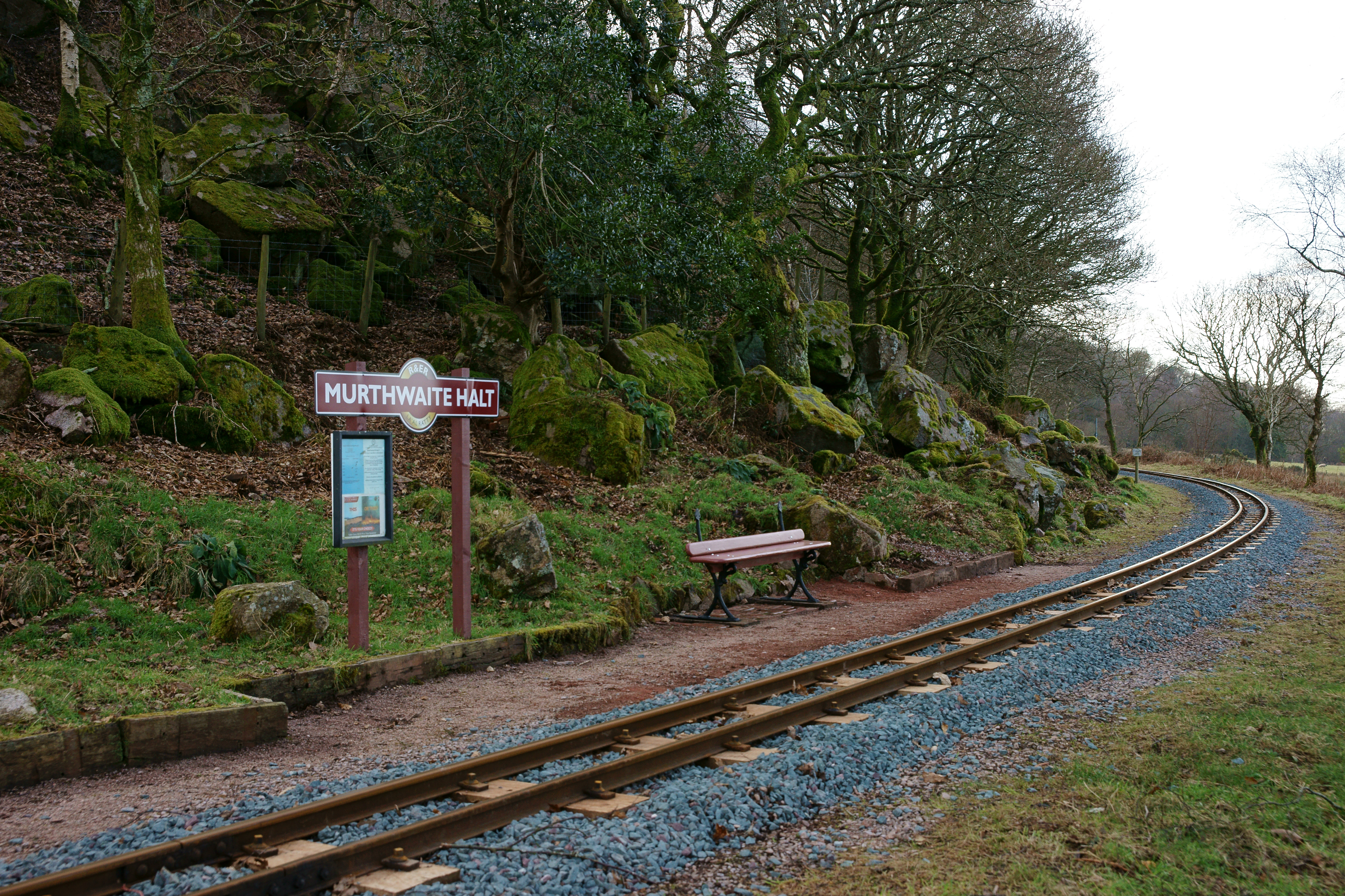

General information
- Location: Eskdale Green, Cumberland; England
- Coordinates: 54.381°N 3.362°W
- System: Station on heritage railway
- Owner: R&ER
- Operator: R&ER
- Manager: R&ER
- Platforms: 1

Key dates
- 1876: Opened (Standard gauge)
- 1913: Station closed
- 1916: Reopened (15 in gauge
Location

Murthwaite Halt railway station is a small intermediate railway station on the 15" gauge Ravenglass & Eskdale Railway in Cumbria, England. It is named after the (now ruined) farm that stood in the field opposite the railway.

The station is located 2.75 miles (4.43 km) from Ravenglass and 4.25 miles (6.84 km) from Dalegarth.

== Accessibility ==
Due to Murthwaite Halt only being on a public footpath, which is not, in any way, suitable for wheelchair users, wheelchair users are not permitted to alight at this halt.

== Quarrying and stone crushing ==
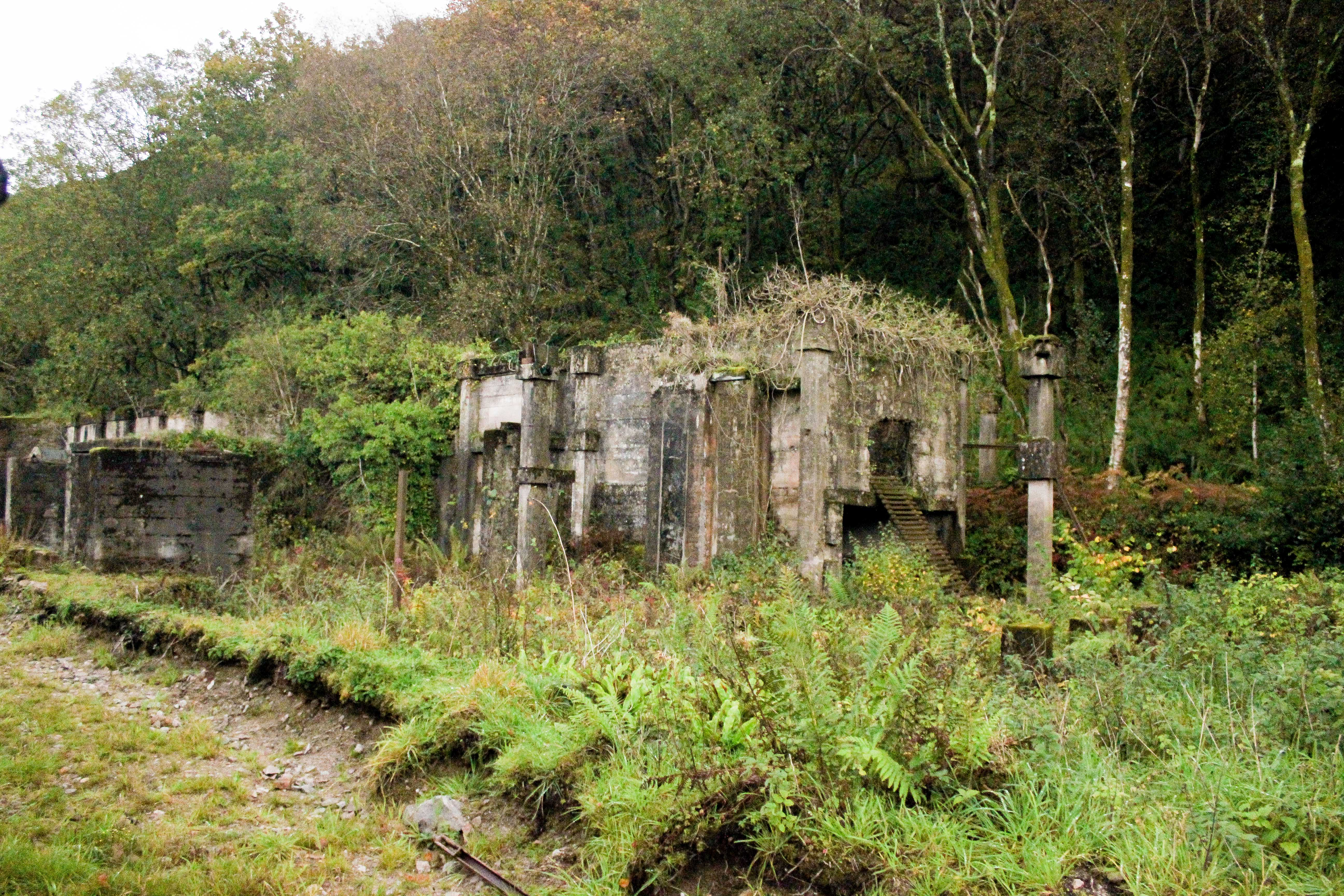
Surviving concrete base of the old crusher

The railway serviced the Murthwaite stone crushing plant, built in the 1920s to crush granite from the quarries further up the railway's valley. This was in operation from the 1920s until 1953, and between 1929 and 1953 there was a standard gauge branch from Ravenglass to the crushing plant, the rails being gauntletted either side of the 15" gauge ones.

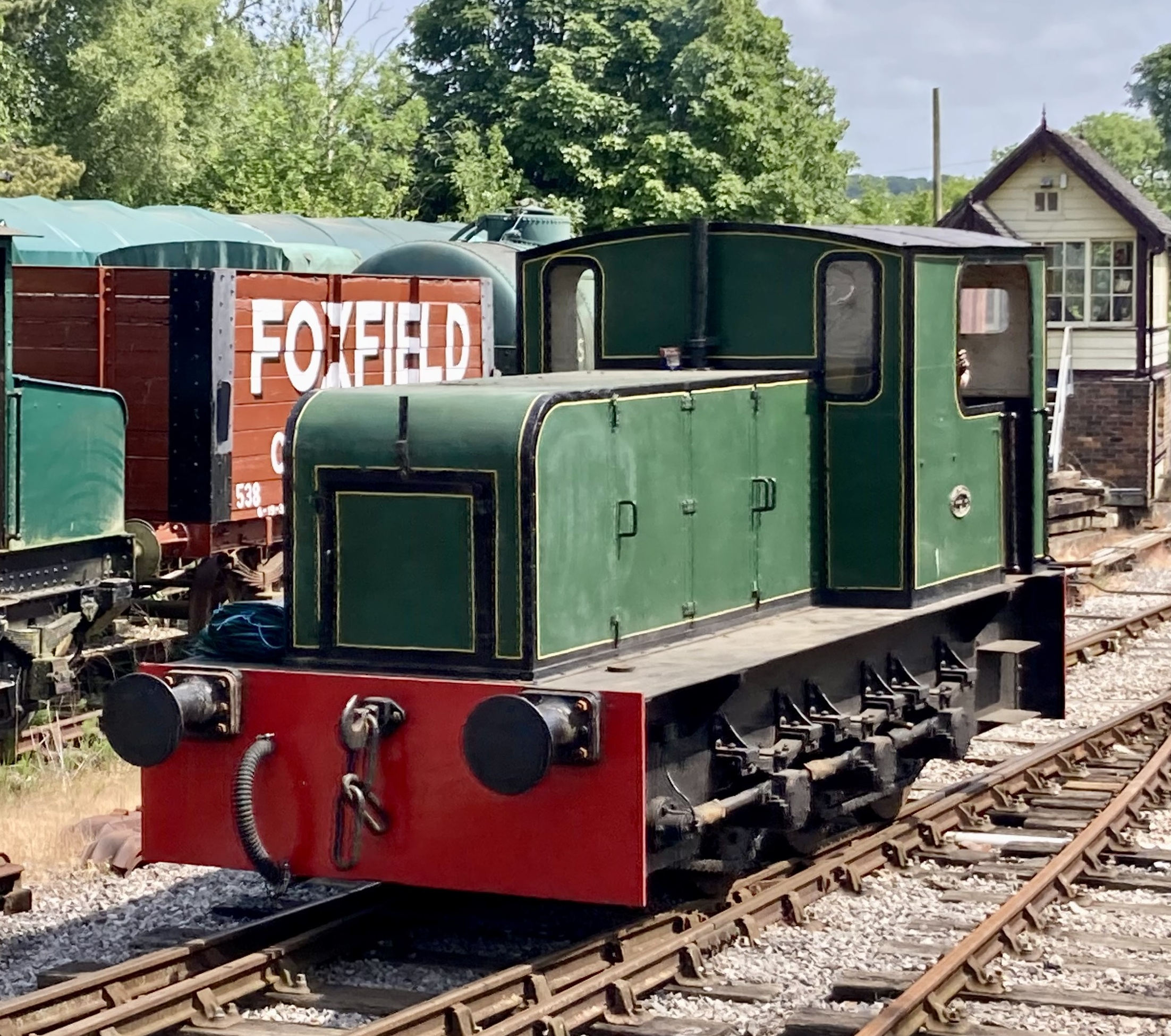
The 1929 Kerr Stuart locomotive, purchased to work the standard gauge line to the crusher

Preceding station	Heritage railways	Following station
Miteside Halt towards Ravenglass	Ravenglass & Eskdale Railway	Irton Road towards Dalegarth
