= Fisherground railway station =

Railway station in Cumbria, England

Fisherground
- The halt, with sign and shelter, and campsite beyond

General information
- Location: Eskdale Green, Cumberland; England
- Coordinates: 54.391970°N 3.303697°W
- Grid reference: NY 152003
- System: Station on heritage railway
- Owner: R&ER
- Operator: R&ER
- Manager: R&ER

Key dates
- 1876: Opened (3 ft gauge)
- 1913: Station closed
- 1916: Reopened (15 in gauge
Location

Fisherground railway station, also known as Fisherground Halt, is on the 15-inch (380 mm) gauge Ravenglass & Eskdale Railway in Cumbria, England. Its main purpose is to serve the adjoining camp site. A passing loop is situated 100 metres (330 ft) to the west of the halt, whilst a no longer used water tank is situated at the halt itself.

The water tank was installed in the days of the 3ft gauge railway, and was the main watering point for locos on the railway. The tank continued to be used by the 15 inch gauge railway into the preservation era, although it has now fallen into disuse.

The station may be accessed by a public footpath that starts at the campsite, goes through the campsite and crosses the line, where the station is. The footpath then goes on to Miteadale. It is a request stop only.

During the high season, it may be staffed by volunteers from the Ravenglass & Eskdale Railway, who sell tickets from the shelter and act as station masters and is about 5 miles (8 km) from Ravenglass and 1 1/2 miles (2 km) from Dalegarth.

== Accessibility ==
Due to the railway station being on a public footpath, which is not accessible to the disabled, wheelchair users are not permitted to alight here.

== Gallery ==
Trains passing at the loop, just to the west of the halt

River Mite at the water tank, just to the east of the halt

Preceding station	Heritage railways	Following station
The Green towards Ravenglass	Ravenglass & Eskdale Railway	Beckfoot towards Dalegarth
