= Miteside Halt railway station =

Railway station in Cumbria, England

Miteside Halt
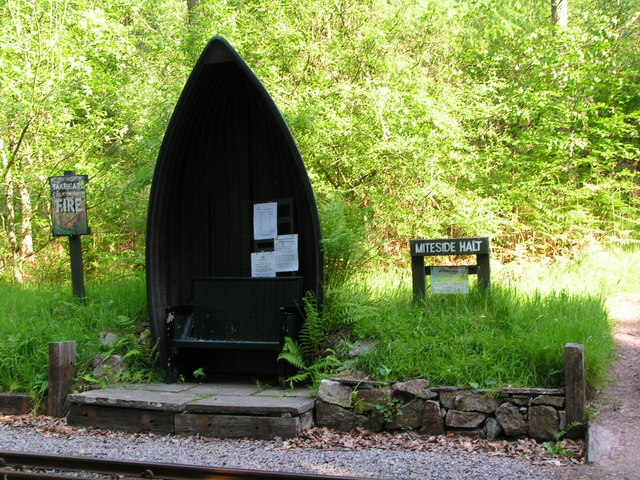
- The shelter and nameboard at Miteside Halt

General information
- Location: Muncaster, Cumberland; England
- Coordinates: 54.371°N 3.384°W
- Grid reference: SD 102 983
- System: Station on heritage railway
- Owner: R&ER
- Operator: R&ER
- Manager: R&ER
- Platforms: 1

Key dates
- 1876: Opened (3 foot gauge)
- 1913: Station closed
- 1916: Reopened (15 in gauge)
Location

Miteside Halt railway station is a railway station on the 15" gauge Ravenglass & Eskdale Railway in Cumbria, England. It is located where public footpath and the railway cross, a short way west of the passing loop. It was first opened in the days of the 3ft gauge railway, to serve the residents of the nearby Miteside House. A former resident of Miteside House was William James Linton, who moved there in 1849, before the line was opened. To provide protection from the elements, a upturned boat hull was provided as a shelter. This tradition of using a boat hull as a shelter continues to this day, the current boat is the third one in the halt's history.

== Accessibility ==
Miteside Halt is only accessible by a public footpath, not in any way suitable for wheelchair users. Therefore, the company have taken the decision not to allow wheelchair users to depart at this station.

Preceding station	Heritage railways	Following station
Muncaster Mill towards Ravenglass	Ravenglass & Eskdale Railway	Murthwaite Halt towards Dalegarth
