= Muncaster Mill railway station =

Railway station in Cumbria, England

Muncaster Mill
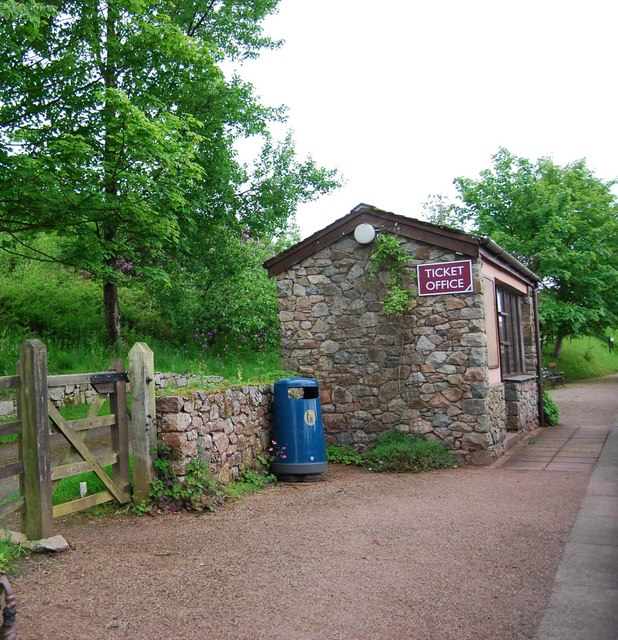
- Muncaster Mill railway station

General information
- Location: Muncaster, Cumberland; England
- Coordinates: 54.367°N 3.394°W
- Grid reference: SD095977
- System: Station on heritage railway
- Owner: R&ER
- Operator: R&ER
- Manager: R&ER
- Platforms: 1

Key dates
- 1876: Opened (3 foot gauge)
- 1913: Station closed
- 1916: Reopened (15 in gauge)
Location

Muncaster Mill railway station is a railway station on the 15 in (381 mm) gauge Ravenglass & Eskdale Railway in Cumbria, England. The station is located 1 mile (1.6 km) from Ravenglass and 6 miles (9.7 km) from Dalegarth, at the point where the A595 coast road crosses the line. It is situated on the bank of the River Mite and adjacent to Muncaster Mill, formerly a watermill but now a private house, from which it takes its name.

== Facilities ==
There is a passenger shelter and disabled-access toilet at the station. There is a siding built into the platform surface, which was formerly used for storage of permanent way engineers' rolling stock, and by shuttle trains on Gala event days. However, the siding has since been disconnected from the main line, by the removal of the points.

Although previously staffed by a station master, the station (in common with all intermediate stops on the railway) is now unstaffed, with trains stopping by request.

== Accessibility ==
The platform is not long enough to accommodate step-free access to the disabled carriages, which are normally located towards the eastern end of each train set, on both the eastbound and westbound journeys.

== Muncaster Mill ==
Muncaster water mill ground wholemeal flour up until the end of World War I but government legislation made this uneconomic so it turned to crushing grain for cattle feed. It ceased operation in 1961. The Ravenglass and Eskdale Railway Company purchased the mill in 1975 and had it restored to working order as a tourist attraction.

== Gallery ==
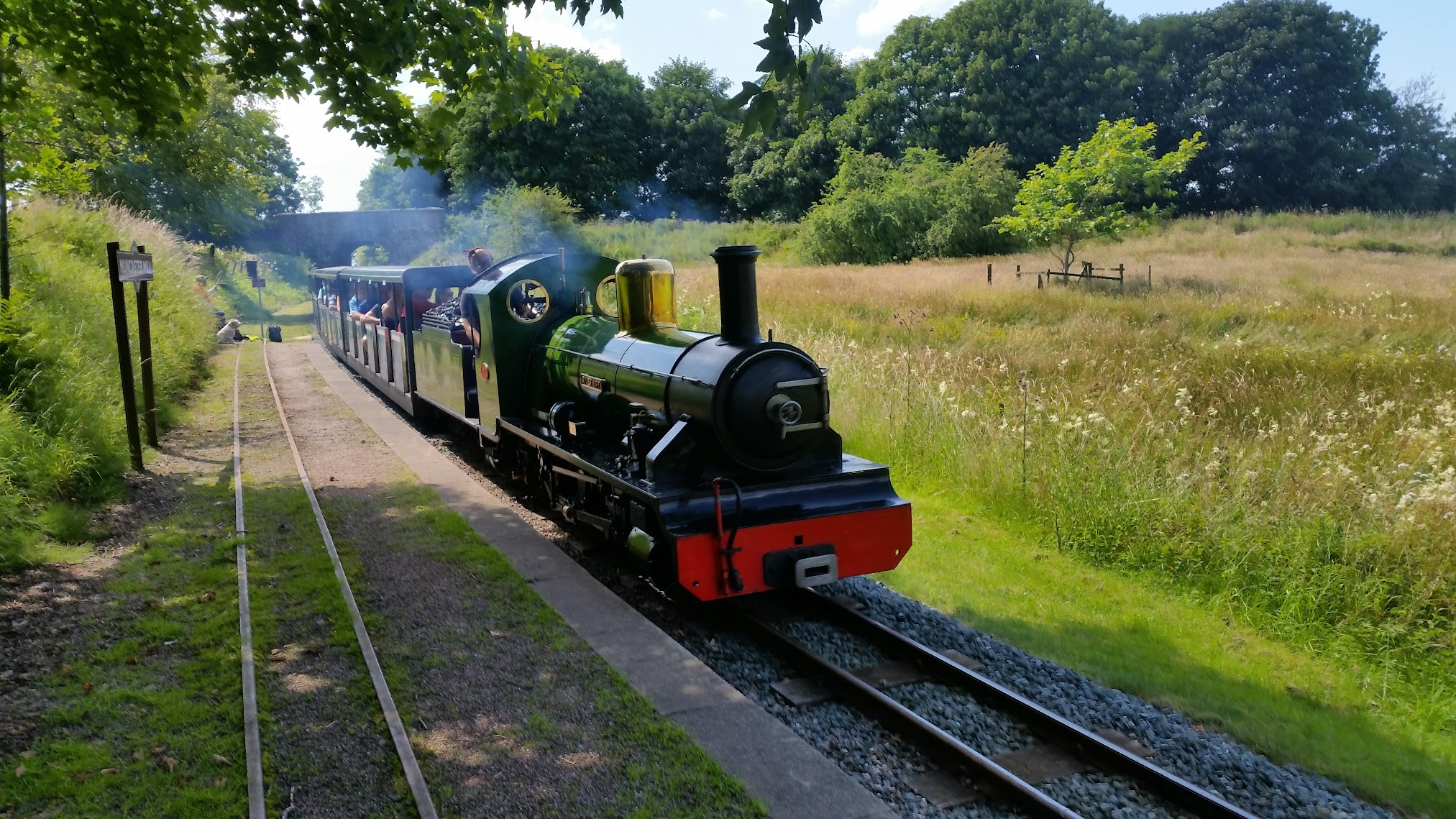
River Irt at Muncaster Mill

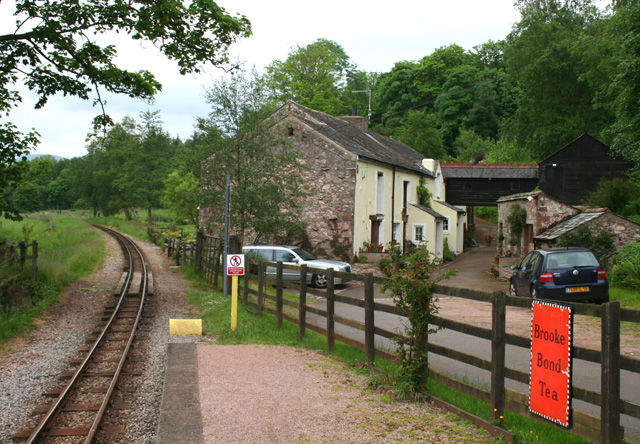
Muncaster Mill seen from the station

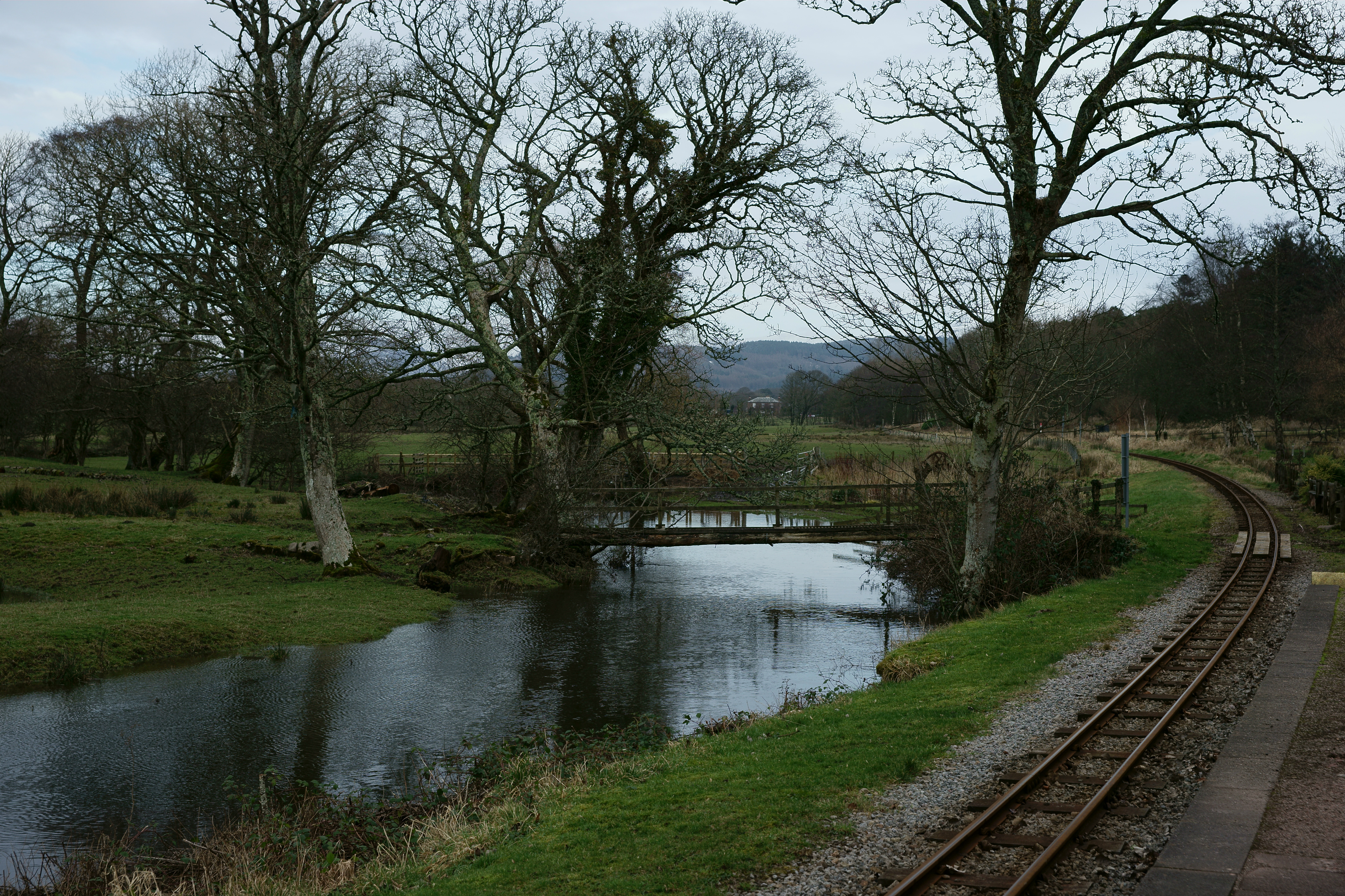
The River Mite seen from the station

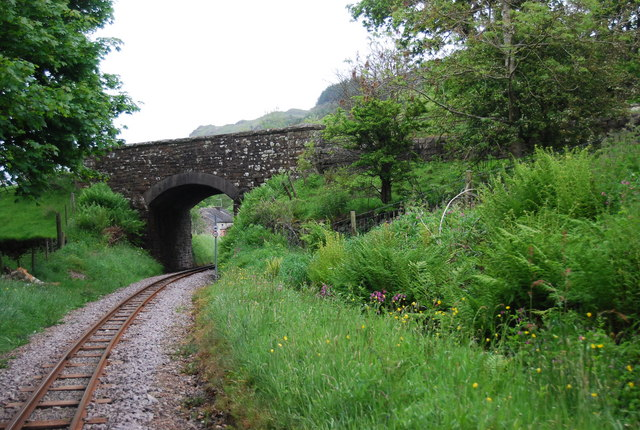
Bridge carrying the A595 across the line

Preceding station	Heritage railways	Following station
Ravenglass Terminus	Ravenglass & Eskdale Railway	Miteside Halt towards Dalegarth
