= Beckfoot railway station =

Railway station on the 15" gauge Ravenglass & Eskdale Railway in Cumbria

Beckfoot Halt
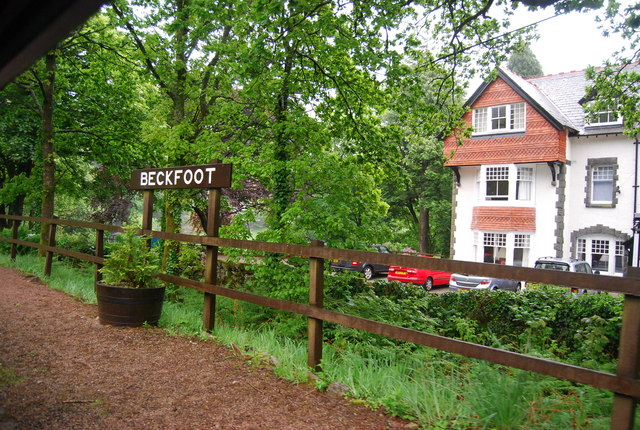
- Beckfoot railway station sign

General information
- Location: Eskdale, Cumbria; England
- Coordinates: 54.393°N 3.283°W
- Grid reference: NY 168 004
- System: Station on heritage railway
- Owner: R&ER
- Operator: R&ER
- Manager: R&ER
- Platforms: 1

Key dates
- 1876: Opened (3 ft gauge)
- 1913: Station closed
- 1916: Reopened (15 in gauge
Location

Beckfoot railway station is a railway station on the 15" gauge Ravenglass & Eskdale Railway in the English county of Cumbria. It is situated in the civil parish of Eskdale and the Lake District National Park, and is within a 1/2 mile (0.80 km) walk of the eastern terminus of the line, at Dalegarth station.

The station opened to passengers in 1876. In the days of the 3 ft gauge railway, this was the last place where the railway met the main valley road, and as such had a greater number of facilities than other stations, including a goods yard and shed, and a chocolate vending machine in the waiting shelter.

Between 1918 and 1922, Beckfoot was the upper terminus of the railway prior to the extension of the line to the present terminus at Dalegarth. The original station building survived for some time into the 15 inch gauge era, but had been demolished by the time the preservationists took over in 1960.

The station is unstaffed at all times, and is only 20 metres (66 ft) long. It can be accessed either by steps or from, the road which crosses the line, east of the station. It differs from the other stations in that passengers will only be picked up here on down journeys (Dalegarth-Ravenglass) and will only be set down here on up journeys (Ravenglass-Dalegarth). This is because the station is close to Dalegarth, and to save stopping for passengers completing very short journeys. There is a level crossing at the eastern end of the platform, marking the beginning of the private road from Beckfoot to Dalegarth cottages which runs for half a mile eastwards. This road is known as Beckfoot Lonnin and walkers can continue behind the Cottages at the end of the Lonnin up to the original 3' gauge railway station at Boot village.

The station is 6.5 miles (10.5 km) from Ravenglass and 1/2 mile (0.80 km) from Dalegarth.

== Accessibility ==
Due to the length of the platform, the railway are unable to accommodate wheelchair passengers, for health & safety reasons.

== Gallery ==
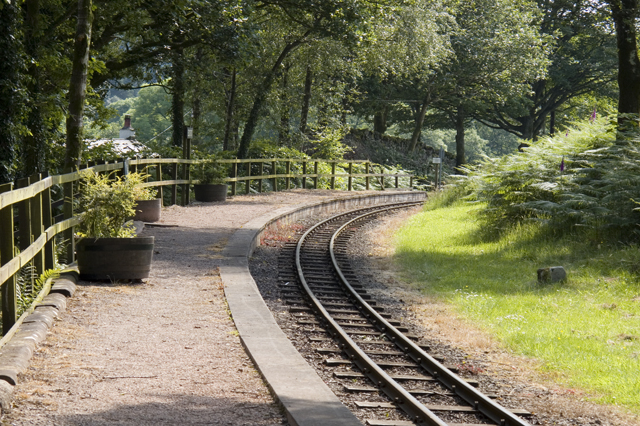
Beckfoot railway station, looking west to Ravenglass

Beckfoot railway station, looking east to Dalegarth

Preceding station	Heritage railways	Following station
Fisherground towards Ravenglass	Ravenglass & Eskdale Railway	Dalegarth Terminus
