= Muir-Hill =

Muir Hill (Engineers) Ltd was a general engineering company based at Old Trafford, Manchester, England. It was established in the early 1920s and specialised in products to expand the use of the Fordson tractor, which in the pre-war days included sprung road wheels, bucket loaders, simple rail locomotives, and in particular in the 1930s they developed the dumper truck. Later they built high horse power tractors.

== Company History ==
Muir Hill (Engineers Ltd) and Muir-Hill Service Equipment Co Ltd both appear in the 1920s. The latter being announced in 1921 as appointed as sole distributors for Great Britain and Ireland for Dearborn and Hinckley-Myers service equipment, Whitehead and Kale rubber-tread wheels for Fordson tractors, and Mechan steel tipping bodies and gears. Both Muir Hill (Engineers) Ltd and Muir Hill Service Equipment Ltd appear in patents of 1924 (along with Walter Llewelyn Hill as co-author) suggesting the two companies ran side by side. The business may have started as resellers of service equipment, and then formed the engineering company to manufacture their own Fordson accessories. From 1922 their location is given as Ashburton Road, Trafford Park, Manchester.

In 1931 Edward Boydell took over and the company was renamed E. Boydell & Co Ltd, though the Muir-Hill trademark continued to be used for its products. In 1959 E. Boydell & Co came under the ownership of Winget Ltd of Kent, but otherwise continued unchanged. Edward Boydell died in July 1962. In 1962 the factory was moved from Manchester to Gloucester, and in 1968 Winget Ltd was acquired by Babcock and Wilcox Ltd, and the E.Boydell company was renamed Muir Hill Limited.

In 1982 Babcock sold its Construction Engineering division including Muir Hill to the German IBH Group a subsidiary of Wilbau AG, however IBH went into receivership in November 1983. Sanderson (Forklifts) Ltd bought Wingets and Muir-Hill from the receiver in June 1984, but they too went into receivership in November 1990. The Muir-Hill business was subsequently acquired by Aveling-Barford at Grantham, and Aveling later sold the Muir-Hill division off to Lloyd Loaders (MH) Ltd of Hipperholme near Halifax in Yorkshire.

This company Lloyd Loaders MH Limited were started in the 1980s specializing into rebuilding reconditioning and repairing all types of heavy duty construction machinery specializing in many British brands as well as other makes on a large site at Hipperholme run by a team of former original employees from the famous David Brown Tractors Limited who will also restore, sell, trade and handle any construction machinery maintenance for their new owners.

== Products ==
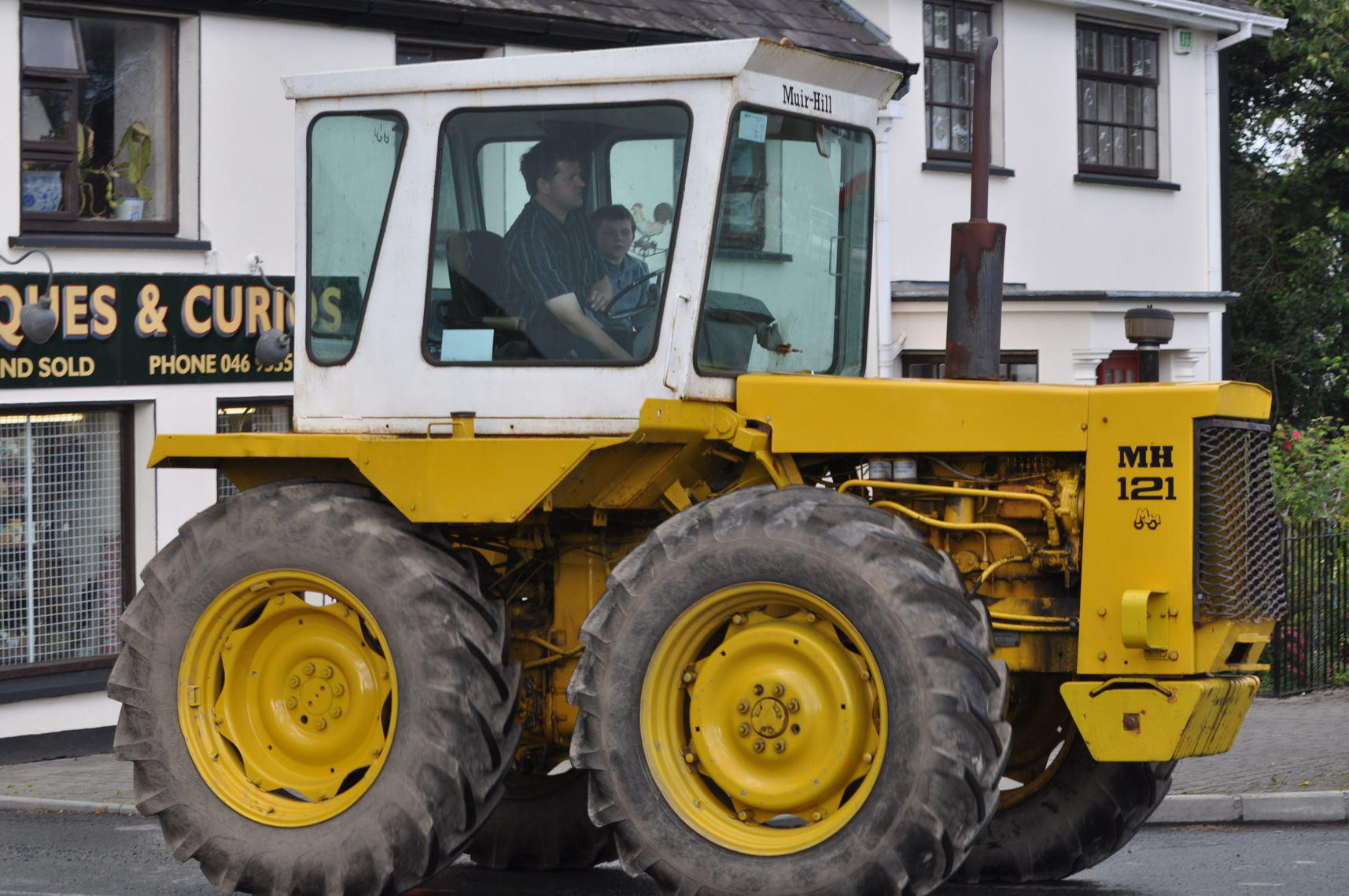
Muir-Hill MH 121 tractor

Initially Muir-Hill appears to have been a reseller of accessories for the Fordson tractor as outlined in the Company History section, however patents in the mid-1920s indicated they were developing their own accessories, such as sprung wheels.

=== Rail Locomotives ===
Muir Hill products included petrol/paraffin engined railway locomotives based on the Fordson tractor. One of the earliest records is one for the standard gauge Weston, Clevedon and Portishead Light Railway in 1921. This was not much more than a standard Fordson tractor with a "Simple type conversion set" supplied by Muir-Hill Service Equipment Ltd - which included 40inch flanged rear wheels and 24inch flanged front wheels, and an angle iron frame to carry the wooden buffer beams. It was used for shunting wagons on the railway's Wick St. Lawrence, but in 1922 when being towed behind a train was derailed and destroyed. The same railway bought another Muir-Hill in 1926 by which time the design had evolved, and now had 40inch wheels at either end linked by chain. This loco worked the jetty for many years and a photo exists of it in 1929 with a wooden glazed cab built by the railway.

Most locos appear to have been for the narrow gauge, for which the Fordson axle width was greater than the track so replacing road wheels with flanged wheels was not sufficient. The early narrow gauge locos were little more than a Fordson Model F tractor skid mounted on a rail chassis, with a long chain outside the frames connecting the rear axle of the tractor to the rail wheels. They were relatively cheap and using a standard Ford tractor engine helped with maintenance costs, however they were not particularly powerful, and the early ones had the standard tractor transmission with the problem of a single low speed reverse gear. It seems likely that this was rectified in later models as the locos on the Ravenglass and Eskdale Railway appear to have transmission entirely within the frames. All surviving examples are from the 1920s (up to 1929), suggesting they were phased out around 1930 in favour of other business.

Users of Muir Hill locomotives included the slate quarries of Blaenau Ffestiniog, the granite quarries of the Ravenglass and Eskdale Railway, the Ashover Light Railway, Weston, Clevedon and Portishead Light Railway, and New Zealand Railways.

The Ffestiniog railway evaluated a 4wPM locomotive of around 20 hp constructed by Muir Hill (Engineers) Ltd in about 1922. It came to the FR on loan from the Aluminium Corporation's Cowlyd Reservoir Railway near Dolgarrog, arriving at Blaenau Ffestiniog on 9 April 1924. The loan was arranged by Henry Joseph Jack, who at the time controlled the WHR and FR and believed that a fleet of these units could provide cost-effective haulage for most purposes.

Based on a Fordson tractor, the Muir Hill had three speeds in forward but only one in reverse. Trials were conducted in early May. It performed poorly on the steeply graded railway, being barely able to pull 'an ordinary guards van' from Beddgelert to South Snowdon (Rhyd Ddu). Later in May it was tried to power the machinery at Boston Lodge. In a further trial it ran very well from Blaenau Ffestiniog to South Snowdon with a small van but could only return to Beddgelert at 2¼ mph because of its inadequate reverse gearing. These poor results were reported to the Board in June and the unit returned to Dolgarrog.

=== Shunters ===
Muir-Hill produced shunters, but these were Fordson road tractors modified to shunt rail wagons on dockyards, factory yards, and other paved railway sidings - they were not rail vehicles. This was not a short-lived idea, they were produced from the 1920s, until the 1960s.

Muir-Hill shunters were introduced at the Fordson Exhibition in 1926. The example shown was fitted with shunting buffers designed for standard gauge wagons, attached by strong girders to the rear axle. The vehicle was fitted with rubber tyres, but with pull out cleats. The front wheels were doubled to prevent problems when crossing points.

=== Loaders and Shovels ===
Muir-Hill's first association with loaders came in June 1923 when they became agents for an American made 'Speciality Loader' for the Fordson tractor. This had a bucket conveyor to lift material from the back of the tractor, which was then dropped onto a conveyor to discharge in front of the tractor into a waiting wagon. The whole assembly was driven by the tractor PTO pulley. In 1931 at the Roads and Transport Exhibition they showed a Fordson tractor mounted loading shovel alongside their dumper, referred to later as the type 45 loading shovel. Tractor mounted loaders were a standard part of the Muir-Hill offering up to and after the war, with several evolutions in the associated framework to ensure stability on uneven ground.

In 1951 they introduced a mini-loader, the LH1, designed for working in confined spaces, and available with petrol or oil engines. This was clearly not an adaptation of a standard Fordson tractor, and marked a significant departure for Muir-Hill. In 1955 a new Supalift version of their 2-WL oil-engined loader was introduced, this having a discharge height of 14 ft 8 in (the standard WL-2 had a discharge height of 11 ft 2 in). The Muir-Hill loaders by this stage no longer looked like tractors with attachments. The loaders were available with 6 different buckets according to the load type.

In 1958 Muir-Hill introduced their first four-wheel drive vehicle, the 4-WL. This was described as a tractor shovel, and had four large wheels, driven by a six speed gearbox with supplementary hub reduction gearing giving 12 forward speeds and four reverse. It was intended as an alternative to a tracked shovel, and employed skid steering much like a tracked vehicle.

In 1962 the BD4 tractor shovel was introduced, with a 3.6 litre Fordson Super Major engine, four wheel drive, and rear steering. The same engine was also used in the RD2 rear wheel drive loader. A range of different loaders were produced through the 1960s and 1970s, some 2-wheel drive, some 4-wheel drive, and some with 4-wheel steering. The last model (the F7500) was launched in 1978.

=== Dumper Trucks ===
Muir-Hill came up with the concept of the dumper truck in 1927, effectively a Fordson tractor in reverse. The drivers seat was placed alongside the engine over the steering wheels (now the rear wheels), and a 2 cubic yard tipping bucket was mounted over the driven axle. The early versions of this 'dumping tractor' for sale in 1931 had to change wheels for use off-road or on road, but in 1933 new Dunlop low-pressure pneumatic tyres came available which removed this limitation, and the trucks by now known as Muir-Hill dumpers were rapidly adopted for construction work. Around 1932 the Fordson model F engine was replaced by the more powerful Fordson Model N engine (though still using petrol/TVO). By the 1937 Road and Transport Exhibition Boydell's Muir-Hill dumper range had expanded to handle 1 to 3 cubic yards. They all had gravity tip and all had pneumatic tyres. In addition they continued to market their type 45 loader, again based on the Fordson tractor.

Muir-Hill continued dumper production through WW2, and supplied 14,000 to the Ministry of Supply (who were the purchasing agents for all government departments and the military). After the war a considerable number of these went back to Muir-Hill to be converted and resold for agricultural use as the 'Powercart'. This had the dumper bucket replaced by a flat bed tipper body, and had the seat rotated (so the back was towards the load), which allowed them to be registered for use on the road. Adverts for Muir-Hill Powercarts appeared from November 1946 through to April 1947.

After the war Muir-Hill adopted a system whereby the drivers seat and controls could be rotated to face forward or backward. The presence of the forward control position allowed them to be road registered, and they were named 'HiWay' models to reflect that. In 1948 they exhibited 3 models, the 10B (2.5 to 3 cubic yards), 14B (3.5 to 4 cubic yards) and the 20B (5 to 6 cubic yards). The 10B used the four cylinder side-valve Ford E27N petrol/TVO engine and conventional dumper appearance. The 14B and 20B looked more like commercial vehicles with a cab, the 14B using a Perkins P6 oil engine, while the 20B had a 7.7litre AEC oil engine. They also produced a 10S model which was forward control, without the option to rotate the seat and controls to face the load.

After the buy out by Wingets several smaller dumpers were added to the range, such as the Winget Muir-Hill 15cwt 2S, the 22cwt 3S, and the 30-cwt 4SR (which had rear wheel drive), the larger models were the 10B, 14B and 18B.

They also built forklifts based on a tractor skid unit for a period before other manufacturers entered the market with better machines, and built some of the earlier articulated dumpers that evolved into the modern ADT.

=== Four-wheel-drive tractors ===
Muir-Hill launched their 4-wheel drive tractor in 1966, using a six-cylinder Ford 101 hp industrial oil engine and Ford 5000 gearbox. The first model was called the 101 after the horsepower. The company's four-wheel-drive tractors with equal sized wheels by fitting a driven front axle running from output from a sandwich plate between the gearbox and rear axle casings. Because of the size of the axle this meant the whole tractor was raised considerably from standard height. However the traction gains were considerable (as with County and Roadless tractors) and Muir-Hills have been and are used for heavy draught applications, the manufacturer claiming the 101 could more than double your productivity. Tractor production continued with several higher power 4WD models until Babcock sold the tractor business in 1982.

The four wheel drive range also included a range of Jib cranes from 1966, and the MH XL-200 20ton mobile crane, and the MH Four-5000 rough terrain forklift in 1980, and a wide range of loading shovels. The forklift was steered by central articulation. The A5000 loading shovel had 4WD and 4-wheel steer as well.

== Preservation of Early Examples ==
At least three Muir-Hill locomotives survive, two are at the Ravenglass & Eskdale Railway, one in the Museum, the other greatly modified. The third surviving locomotive was new in 1925 to the Meeth (North Devon) China Clay Company, and has been completely restored and is in private ownership.

There is a surviving 1940 dumper formerly at a Royal Ordnance Factory (which is essentially the same design as the 1930s dumpers), and a few post-war 10B dumpers have been restored.

Threlkeld Quarry Museum holds examples of Muir Hill equipment.
