= Eskmeals railway station =

Disused railway station in Cumbria, England

Eskmeals

General information
- Location: Eskmeals, Cumberland; England
- Coordinates: 54.3354°N 3.4049°W
- Grid reference: SD 087 942
- Platforms: 2

Other information
- Status: Disused

History
- Original company: Whitehaven and Furness Junction Railway
- Pre-grouping: Furness Railway
- Post-grouping: London, Midland and Scottish Railway

Key dates
- 8 July 1850: Opened
- 3 August 1959: Closed
- 1982-96: Demolished
Location

Eskmeals is a former railway station in the Eskmeals area of the Cumbrian coast, England. It was located on the Cumbrian Coast Line, south of Ravenglass and near to the estuary of the River Esk. It was situated at the southern end of Eskmeals Viaduct. It served a scattered farming community.

== History ==
The Whitehaven and Furness Junction Railway was authorised in 1847 to build a line which would link the town of Whitehaven with the Furness Railway at Broughton-in-Furness. It was opened in stages, and the section between Ravenglass through Eskmeals to Bootle opened either on 19 July 1850 or on 8 July 1850. On 28 October 1850 the last section between Bootle and Broughton-in-Furness was formally opened.

The coastal line through Eskmeals survived Beeching and carries a regular all stations service to this day. Eskmeals is the only station between Barrow-in-Furness and Whitehaven shown in the Bradshaw's Guide 1922 which has closed. Passenger services were withdrawn by the British Transport Commission on 3 August 1959. The buildings remained intact until the early 1980s but have since been demolished; the disused and overgrown platforms survive and can be seen from passing trains.

== Services ==
In 1922 five trains in each direction called at Eskmeals, Monday to Saturday. One ran from Millom, calling at all stations to Whitehaven, the other four called at all stations from Carnforth to Whitehaven.

Two all stations trains in each direction between Carnforth and Whitehaven called on Sundays.

Preceding station	Historical railways	Following station
Ravenglass for Eskdale; Line and station open	Furness Railway; Whitehaven and Furness Junction Railway	Bootle; Line and station open
