= Dumper =

Truck designed for carrying bulk material

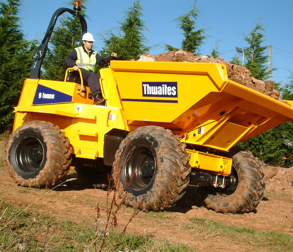
A Thwaites dumper in action

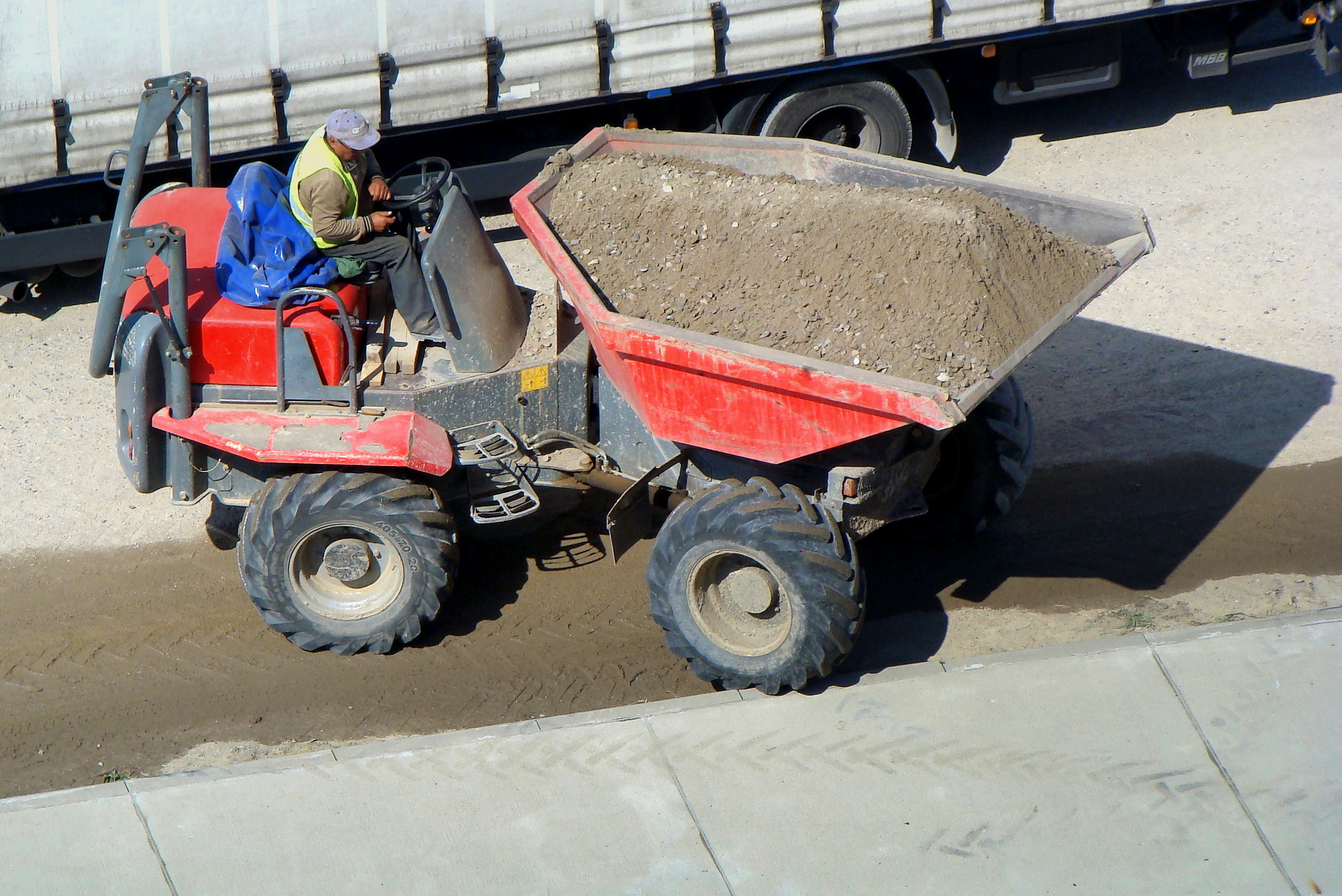
A Neuson dumper

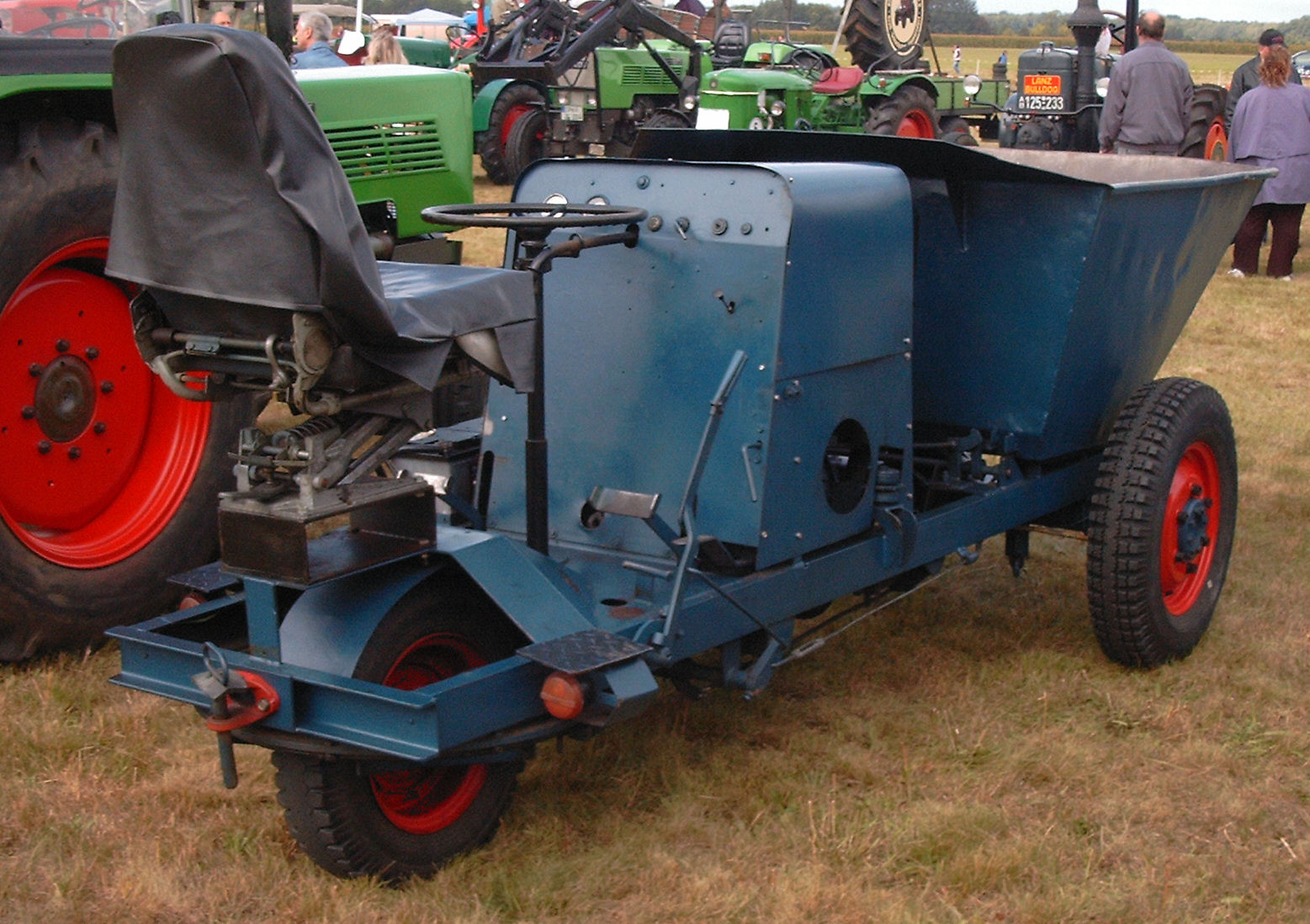
A German-made Picco 1 dumper with one rear wheel in the midline. See de:Picco 1 (in German)

A dumper or dumper truck is a vehicle designed for carrying bulk material, often on building sites. A dumper has a body which tilts or opens at the back for unloading and is usually an open 4-wheeled vehicle with the load skip in front of the driver. The skip can tip to dump the load; this is where the name "dumper" comes from. They are normally diesel powered. A towing eye is fitted for secondary use as a site tractor. Dumpers with rubber tracks are used in special circumstances and provide a more even distribution of weight compared to tires. Continuous tracks allow the operator to carry heavier payload on slick, snowy, or muddy surfaces, and are popular in some countries. Rubber track dumpers offer even weight distribution for transporting heavy payloads over challenging terrains like mud or snow, popular in certain regions.

== Background ==
One of the earliest British dumpers was the Muir-Hill, which was based on the Fordson tractor with 2 cubic yard bucket, driving on the front axle and steered by the back wheels. Devised in 1927, and on sale by 1931, it gained a lot of versatility when in 1933 Dunlop introduced 'tractor-style' pneumatic low pressure tyres. This allowed it to travel on tarmac roads or off-road, which was of particular advantage on construction sites. Originally advertised as the "dumping tractor", it soon became known as the Muir-Hill dumper.

Modern dumpers have payloads of up to 10 tonnes (11 short tons; 9.8 long tons) and usually steer by articulating at the middle of the chassis (pivot steering). They have multi-cylinder diesel engines, some turbocharged, electric start and hydraulics for tipping and steering and are usually four-wheel drive. An A-frame known as a ROPS (Roll-Over Protection) frame, may be fitted over the seat to protect the driver if the dumper rolls over. Some dumpers have FOPS (Falling Object Protection) as well. Lifting skips are available for discharging above ground level. In the 1990s, dumpers with swivel skips, which could be rotated to tip sideways, became popular, especially for working in narrow sites such as road works. Dumpers are the most common cause of serious accidents involving construction plant.

Nowadays these vehicles are also called "dumper" in some mainland European languages.

== See also ==
- Articulated hauler
- Dump truck
- Haul truck
