= River Mite =

River in Cumbria, England

Mite
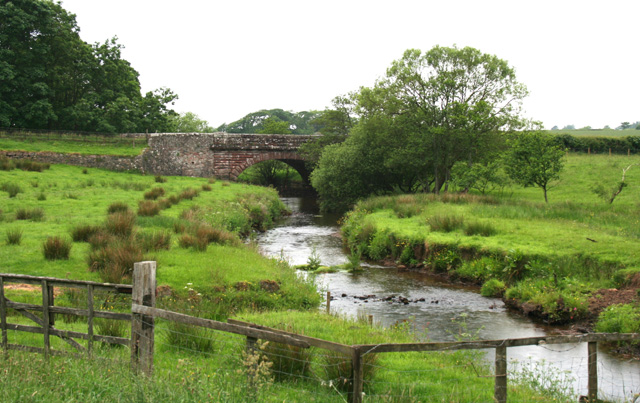
- The River Mite near Muncaster Mill

- Location of the mouth within Cumbria

Location
- Country: United Kingdom
- Constituent country: England
- County: Cumbria

Physical characteristics
- Source
  - coordinates: 54°25′47″N 3°16′57″W
  - elevation: 550 metres (1,800 ft)
- Mouth: Irish Sea
  - location: Ravenglass
  - coordinates: 54°20′17″N 3°25′42″W
  - elevation: 0 metres (0 ft)

The River Mite is a river in the county of Cumbria in Northern England. The valley through which the river Mite runs is called Miterdale.

The name Mite is thought to be of British origin and related to a root such as 'meigh': to urinate or dribble, possibly a wry reflection of the relatively minor nature of the Mite.

The Mite rises on Tongue Moor, immediately below the peak of Illgill Head to the north west, at an altitude of around 550 metres (1,800 ft). After coalescing into a stream, the upper Mite runs over the waterfalls of Miterdale Head and descends into the narrow but steep-sided upper Miterdale valley. It then flows to the south west, past the Bakerstead outdoor pursuit centre. It flows to the north of both the village of Eskdale Green and Muncaster Fell, before reaching Muncaster Mill, just after which the river becomes tidal. Finally, the River Mite meets the River Esk and River Irt at the estuarine confluence of the three, near the ancient village of Ravenglass on the Cumbrian coast.

Between Eskdale Green and Ravenglass, the Mite runs parallel to the narrow-gauge Ravenglass and Eskdale Railway, and one of their steam locomotives is named after the river. Upper Miterdale formed one of the archetypes upon which Arthur Ransome based the valley of Swallowdale in the eponymous volume of Swallows and Amazons series of stories.

== Tributaries ==
- Robin Gill
- Black Gill
- Merebeck Gill
- Mere Beck
- Gill Beck
