= Ravenglass railway station =

Railway station in Cumbria, England

Ravenglass Ravenglass for Eskdale
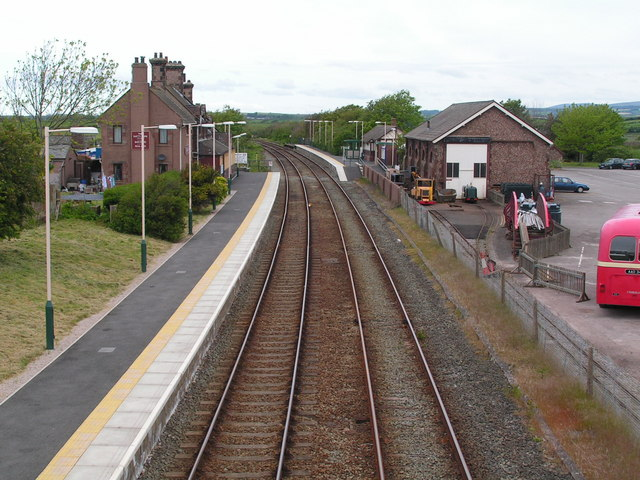

General information
- Location: Ravenglass, Cumberland; England
- Coordinates: 54°21′20″N 3°24′32″W
- Grid reference: SD085964
- Owner: Network Rail
- Manager: Northern Trains
- Platforms: 2
- Tracks: 2
- Connections: Ravenglass (R&ER)

Other information
- Station code: RAV
- Classification: DfT category F2

History
- Original company: Whitehaven and Furness Junction Railway
- Pre-grouping: Furness Railway
- Post-grouping: London, Midland and Scottish Railway; British Rail (London Midland Region)

Key dates
- 19 July 1849: Opened

Passengers
- 2021/22: ▲29,470
- 2022/23: ▲33,704
- 2023/24: ▲37,818
- 2024/25: ▲38,812
- 2025/26: ▼35,850
Location
- Location within the former Borough of Copeland Location within Cumbria
Notes
- Passenger statistics from the Office of Rail and Road

Ravenglass (also known as Ravenglass for Eskdale) is a railway station on the Cumbrian Coast Line, which runs between Carlisle and Barrow-in-Furness. The station, situated 29 1/4 miles (47 km) north-west of Barrow-in-Furness, serves the village of Ravenglass in Cumbria. It is owned by Network Rail and managed by Northern Trains.

The two parts of the station are separated by the station's car park. The station is owned by Network Rail and managed by Northern Trains, who provide all passenger train services, whilst the Ravenglass and Eskdale Railway run its own platforms and services.

The National Rail station was originally known as Ravenglass before being lengthened to Ravenglass for Eskdale. It was then renamed to Ravenglass on 6 May 1974. When First North Western operated the station during the early part of the 21st century, it reverted to its name of Ravenglass for Eskdale, until Northern Rail rebranded the station signage in 2007, losing the suffix once more. Since 2018 the station has been called "Ravenglass for Eskdale" on all timetables and ticketing, but the station signage remains as "Ravenglass" without the suffix (as at 21 June 2021).

== Overview ==
This station has two platforms, one serving trains travelling towards Barrow-in-Furness and one for trains travelling towards Carlisle. All former station buildings on the National Rail site, which is now unstaffed, are currently owned by the Eskdale Railway company - the main building being a pub, The Ratty Arms, the old southbound shelter a museum (leaving only small shelters for mainline travellers) and the goods shed an engineering workshop. The old Furness Railway main line signal box south of the station also survives - though out of railway use since 1965, it has been restored by the R&ER as a working museum exhibit and is open to the public.

Step-free access to both (staggered) platforms is available, with the northbound one via ramps from the Village Car Park and from the Ratty Arms, and to the southbound platform from the Ravenglass and Eskdale Railway car park. There is also a footbridge link to the R&ER station at the south end of the northbound platform. To cross between the platforms either use the road bridge (north of the station) or the footbridge at the South End of the station, to the R and E R car park. Train running information can be obtained from timetable posters, information screens and by telephone. A ticket machine is also now in service, to allow intending travellers to buy their tickets prior to boarding.

== Services ==
A basic hourly service operates in each direction, although one northbound train terminates at Sellafield rather than running through to Carlisle. Through tickets from trains on the Cumbria Coast Line are available to the Ravenglass and Eskdale Railway. Additional evening trains and the first Sunday service for more than 40 years were introduced at the May 2018 timetable change. This runs broadly hourly each way from mid-morning until 19:00.

== Ravenglass and Eskdale Railway ==
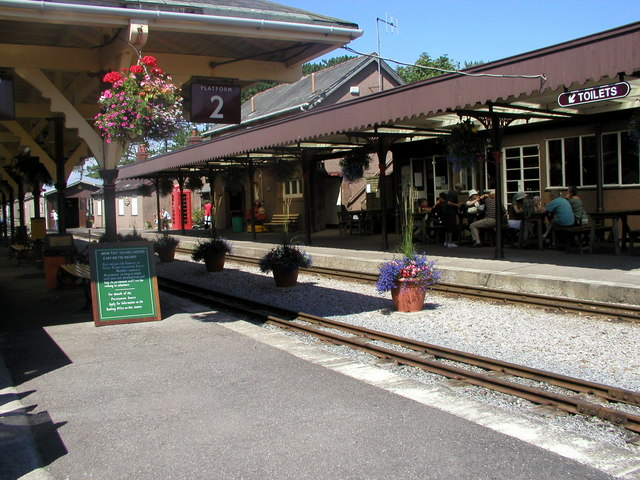
The platforms at the adjacent Ravenglass and Eskdale Railway station.

The Ravenglass and Eskdale Railway, also known as La'al Ratty from Cumbrian dialect, is a heritage railway, providing journeys on a narrow-gauge railway up the scenic Eskdale valley. The Ravenglass station owned by the line is the other side of the car park and is the line's primary station and base of operations, with fully equipped workshops, motive power depot, carriage shed, paint shop and signal box. For passengers, there is a museum, café, gift shop and ticket office. The station has a turntable and three platforms, however only platforms 1 and 3 see regular use.

The station opened in 1875 and has closed and reopened to passengers as the companies have. It has had many changes in layout and design, and is currently at its largest size that it has ever been.

== See also ==
- Ravenglass (R&ER) – the adjacent heritage railway station on the Ravenglass and Eskdale Railway

Preceding station	National Rail	Following station
Drigg	Northern Trains; Cumbrian Coast Line	Bootle
Historical railways
Drigg	Whitehaven and Furness Junction Railway	Eskmeals
Heritage railways
Change for the Ravenglass & Eskdale Railway at Ravenglass (R&ER)
