= Muncaster Fell =

Mountain in the English Lake District, Cumbria, England

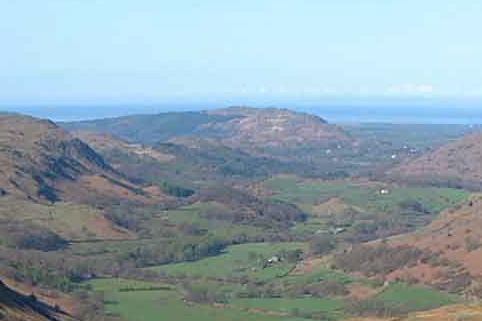
- The view west from Hardknott Pass in upper Eskdale, toward Muncaster Fell.

Highest point
- Elevation: 231 m (758 ft)
- Prominence: 193 m (633 ft)
- Parent peak: Illgill Head
- Listing: Marilyn, Outlying Wainwright, Fellranger
- Coordinates: 54°22′21″N 3°21′50″W

Geography
- Location within the Lake District
- Location: Cumbria, England
- Parent range: Lake District
- OS grid: SD115983
- Topo map: OS Landranger 89/96, Explorer OL6

Muncaster Fell is a fell at the far western edge of the Lake District National Park, in Cumbria, England. Muncaster Fell is a long, narrow ridge of land, approximately 1.2 km wide and 6 km long, lying between the River Mite to the north, and River Esk to the south. The fell rises from the coast near Ravenglass village to its highest point at Hooker Crag (231 m). The ridge then continues to the north-east, dropping gently to its furthest prominence at Silver Knott (174 m). The fell then falls away rapidly to the village of Eskdale Green at its north-eastern tip.

== Landscape ==
The fell forms a long, low, yet steep-sided ridge that separates the southern portions of the valleys of Miterdale and Eskdale. The north-western slopes of the fell are characterised by steep crags and scree slopes, which drop abruptly to the fluvial floor of the Mite valley. The narrow-gauge Ravenglass and Eskdale Railway tracks cling to the lower sides of this rocky face. The south-eastern, Eskdale slopes are not much less steep, but are shallow enough to allow the cultivation of a number of forestry plantations. Woodland abounds at the southernmost tip of the fell, with natural deciduous woodland and invasive rhododendron stands competing for space. On the very south-western point of the fell stands Muncaster Castle, its grounds planted with a wide variety of plant species, including a dense copse of bamboo.

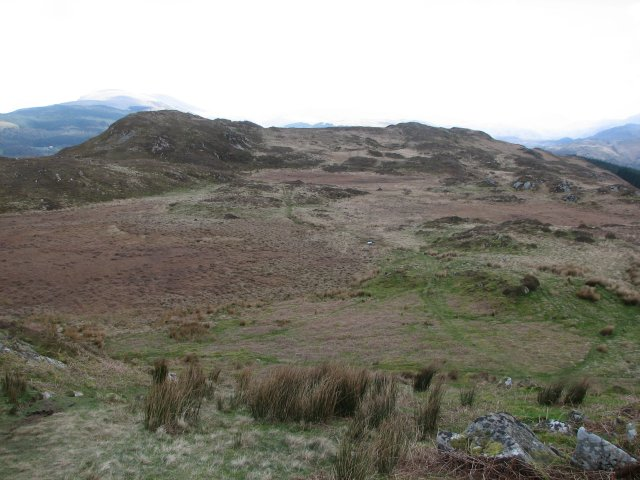
Hooker Moss bog, atop Muncaster Fell

On the fell top the vegetation and landscape typifies the Cumbrian fell. A small tarn, Muncaster Tarn (GR: SD107978), sits amongst woodland on the slopes below the top of Hooker Crag. Much of the area between the crags and bogs is covered by moss, gorse, sedge and small clumps of bilberry bushes. In recent times, in common with much of the Lake District upland area, bracken has begun to take over, possibly due to a reduction in the number of sheep grazing on upland pasture.

Along the southern end of the fell ridge runs a straight track, climbing up past the tarn toward Hooker Crag. This is part of a Roman road which used to connect the large fort of Glannaventa near Ravenglass on the coast, approximately 2 km away, to the garrison at Hardknott Fort (known to the Romans as Mediobogdum) 14 km to the north-east, although the rest of the route along the ridge top has been lost. There is a small, low dolmen, which despite its Stone Age appearance is inscribed Ross's Camp 1883 on the top surface (GR: SD121987) and was apparently built by a shooting party of that date as a luncheon table.

=== Views ===
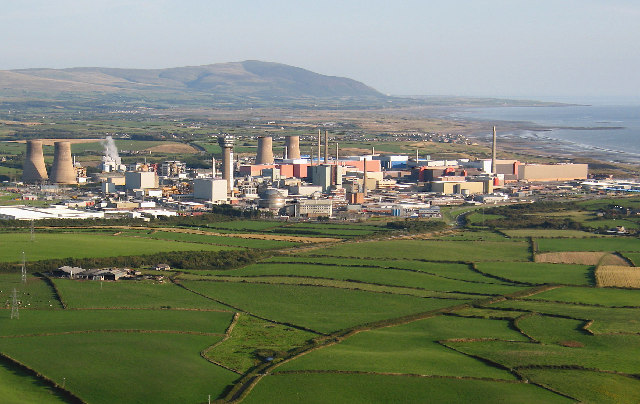
A view from the north toward the fell, looking across the Sellafield nuclear reprocessing site

Muncaster Fell is the subject of a chapter of Alfred Wainwright's walking guide book The Outlying Fells of Lakeland. He recommended a clockwise circuit starting from Muncaster Castle, following the ridge to Muncaster Head so as to enjoy the vista of the high fells ahead, and returning along the lane south of the fell. Wainwright commented that "The supreme joy of Muncaster Fell is the delectable traverse of its ridge ... Here is enchantment."

It is classed as a Fellranger, being described by Richards in the Coniston volume of his book series. It is among the 21 such summits (originally 18 before the extension of the Lake District) which are not included in Wainwright's main list of 214.

The Database of British and Irish Hills recognises two distinct summits: "Muncaster Fell" (listed as a Marilyn, a HuMP and a Tump) of 232.1 metres (761 ft) at SD116986 and "Muncaster Fell - Hooker Crag" (listed as a Tump, Wainwright Outlying Fell, Fellranger and Clem) of 231.4 metres (759 ft) at SD112983.

Being relatively isolated and situated on the coast, views from the fell top include both the mountains of central Cumbria to the northeast, and the coastal plain to the northwest and south. On a clear day, the Isle of Man can be seen across the Irish Sea to the west. For the latter part of the 20th century the view to the northwest was dominated by the twin chimneys of the Windscale Piles nuclear reactors. However, these landmarks were dismantled in the early years of the new millennium, and with the gradual removal of other chimneys and cooling towers associated with the power station, the Sellafield site is now far less imposing. Modern electricity generation technology is very evident, however, as the white turbines of the Walney Wind Farms are clearly visible in the Irish Sea to the southwest.

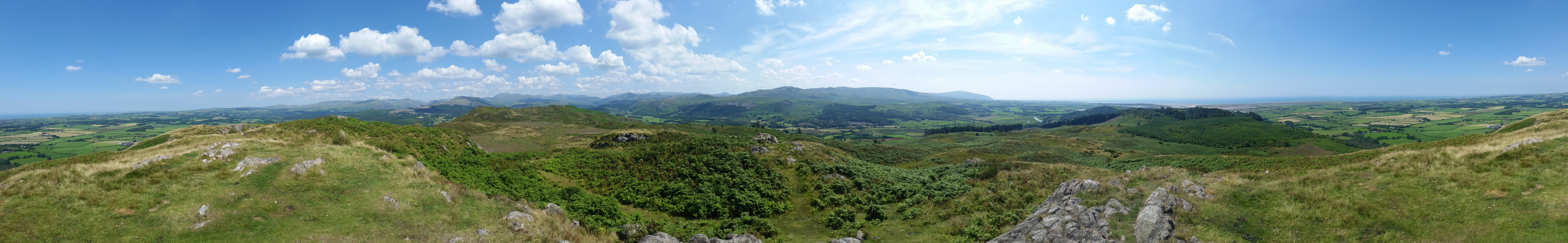
View from Muncaster Fell, Cumbria, UK, July 2017 (Scroll left or right)

== Geology ==
Muncaster Fell is composed almost entirely of granite and microgranite, belonging to the Late Ordovician Eskdale Intrusions. At the south-western end of the fell, between Ravenglass village and Muncaster Castle, is a restricted outcrop of hornfelsed lower Ordovician siltstones and sandstones, belonging to the Skiddaw Group, and andesite of the Borrowdale Volcanic Group.

Owing to its relatively steep-sided profile the fell is largely free of drift geology. The lowest slopes are generally covered in glacial diamicton derived from the igneous lithologies nearer the centre of the Lake District, and the steeper crags give rise to localised scree deposits. Between the crags along the top of the ridge small peat bogs are developed, the largest of these being Hooker Moss (GR: SD113984).
