= Ravenglass and Eskdale Railway =

Heritage railway in Cumbria, England

La'al Ratty
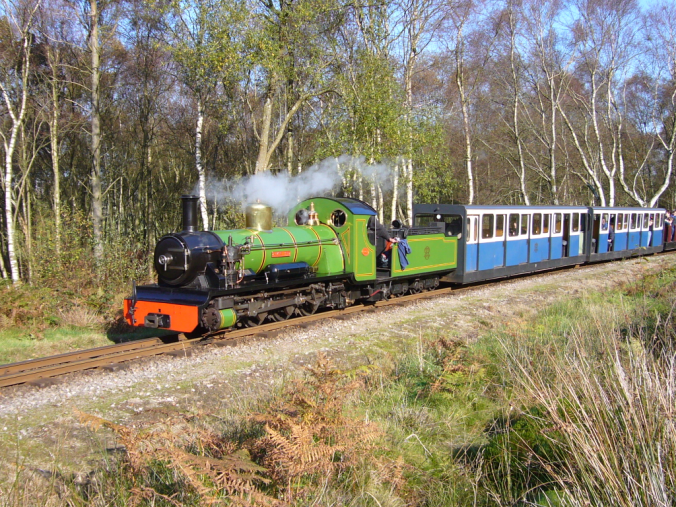
- River Irt approaches Miteside Loop, October 2007
- Terminus: Ravenglass
- Coordinates: 54.355°N 3.408°W
- Connections: Cumbrian Coast Line

Commercial operations
- Built by: Whitehaven Mines Ltd.
- Original gauge: 3 ft (914 mm)

Preserved operations
- Owned by: Ravenglass and Eskdale Railway Co. Ltd
- Operated by: Ravenglass and Eskdale Railway Co. Ltd
- Stations: 9
- Length: 7 miles (11.3 km)
- Preserved gauge: 15 in (381 mm)

Commercial history
- Opened: 24 May 1875
- 1913: Closed
- 1915: Reopened
- Preserved era: Steam

Preservation history
- 1960: Saved by the Ravenglass and Eskdale Railway Preservation Society and reopened owned by the R&ER Co. Ltd.
- 1976: Celebrated centenary of passenger services on the line.
- 1977: New Radio Control System unveiled
- 2010: Celebrated fifty years of preservation.
- Headquarters: Ravenglass

Website
- Official website

Stations on the Ravenglass and Eskdale Railway in Copeland, Cumbria

The Ravenglass and Eskdale Railway is a 15 in (381 mm) minimum-gauge heritage railway in Cumbria, England. The 7-mile (11.3 km) line runs from Ravenglass to Dalegarth Station near Boot in the valley of Eskdale, in the Lake District. At Ravenglass the line ends at Ravenglass railway station on the Cumbrian Coast Line.

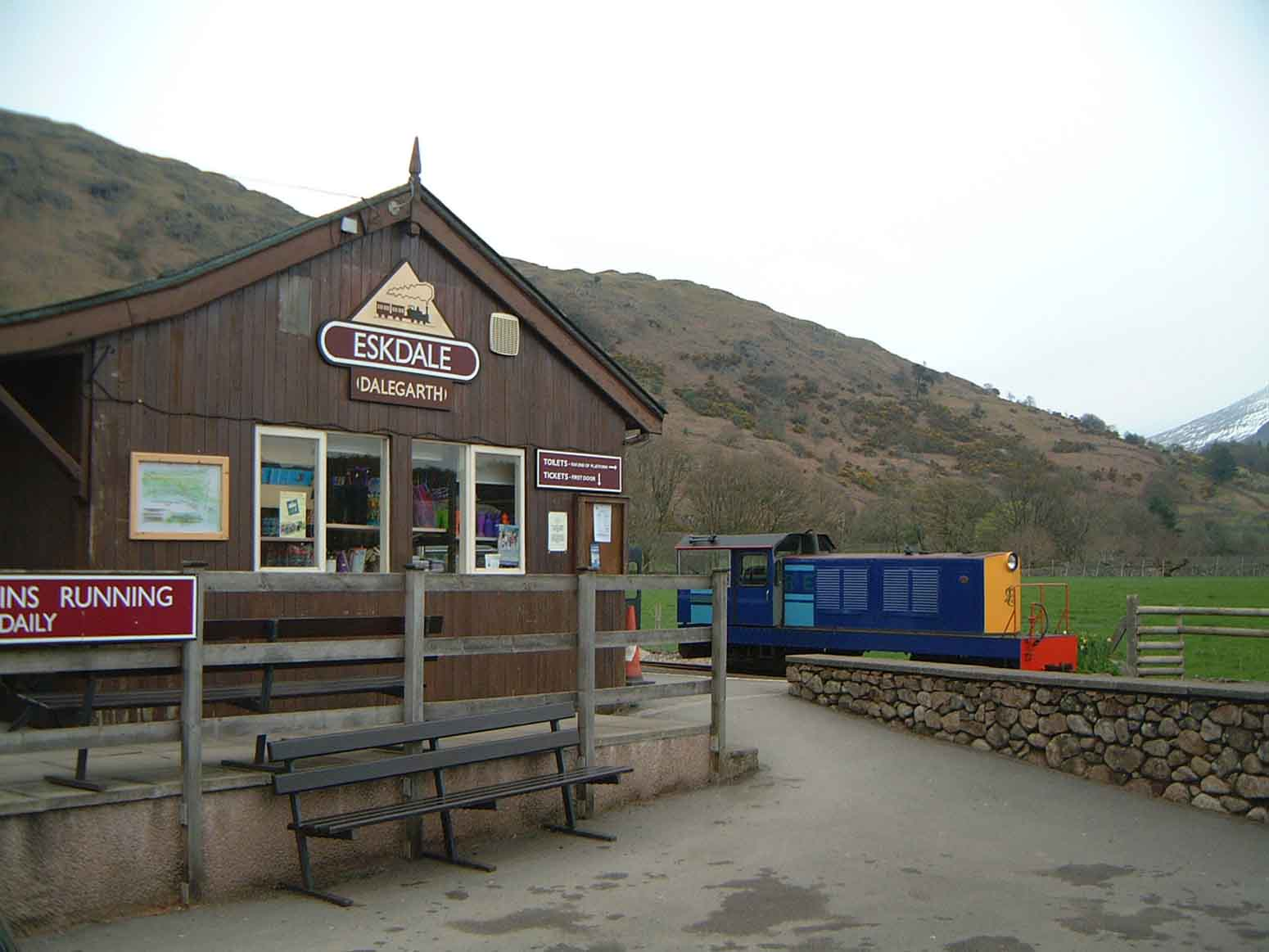
The old building at Dalegarth Station near Boot, with Ravenglass-built diesel loco Lady Wakefield

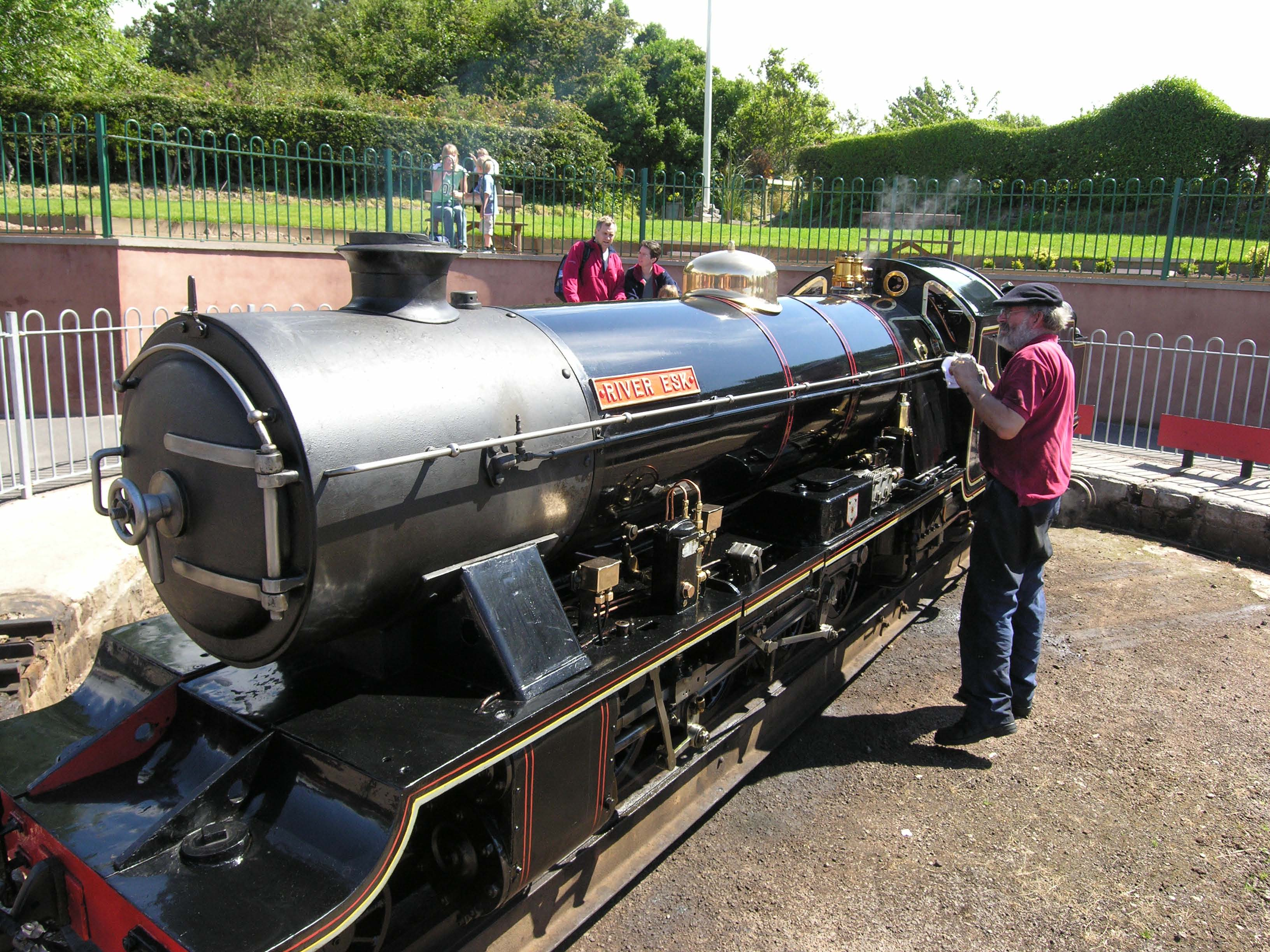
River Esk, with her driver, Peter van Zeller, on the turntable at Ravenglass station

Intermediate stations and halts are at Muncaster Mill, Miteside, Murthwaite, Irton Road, The Green, Fisherground and Beckfoot. The railway is owned by a private company and supported by a preservation society. The oldest locomotive is River Irt, parts of which date from 1894, while the newest is the diesel-hydraulic Douglas Ferreira, built in 2005.

The line is known locally as La'al Ratty and its 3 ft (914 mm) gauge predecessor as Owd Ratty.

Nearby attractions include: the Roman Bath House at Ravenglass; the Hardknott Roman Fort, known to the Romans as Mediobogdum, at the foot of Hardknott Pass; the watermills at Boot and Muncaster; and Muncaster Castle, the home of the Pennington family since 1208.

== History ==
=== Original railway ===
The original Ravenglass and Eskdale Railway was authorised by the Ravenglass and Eskdale Railway Act 1873 (36 & 37 Vict. c. xlviii). It was a 3 ft (914 mm) line opened on 24 May 1875 to transport hematite iron ore from three mines near and around the village of Boot to the Furness Railway standard gauge line at Ravenglass. There has previously been a dispute about the gauge the railway was built to. It is shown as 3 feet in records but is quoted as 2 ft 9 in (838 mm) in some books such as the ABC of Narrow Gauge Railways. This figure was believed for many years until the present company discovered a sleeper from before the line closed, with spacings between holes made by track spikes confirming the gauge was the wider one. The confusion probably stems from the fact that the line was built under the condition that it was "of a gauge not less than 2' 9" ".

Following requests from the residents of the Eskdale valley for a passenger service, the railway was upgraded to meet the minimum standards of the Board of Trade, and the first passenger trains ran in November 1876. It was the first public narrow-gauge railway in England. However, the cost of upgrading the line for passengers left the railway company with substantial debts which it was unable to pay off. The company was forced to declare itself bankrupt in 1877, although trains continued to run under the control of a series of receivers. Nonetheless, in 1880 a tramway was built connecting the line near Beckfoot railway station to newly opened mines across the River Esk at Gill Force. All but one of the iron ore mines closed within 10 years of the railway opening, and there was not enough traffic from other sources (local goods and passengers from the villages and farms of the valley) to sustain the railway. The railway "struggled on" by carrying granite from local quarries and became popular with summer tourists. The Summer 1898 Furness Railway timetable shows five weekday trains along the line with three on Sundays.

In 1905, a passenger train was derailed at Murthwaite due to a combination of a defective locomotive and defective track. By 1908 the track-work was in such poor condition, it was declared unsafe for passengers by the Board of Trade. The railway closed to passengers that year. Goods trains continued to run whilst attempts were made to raise money to rebuild the railway. These attempts failed, and the railway closed completely in April 1913.

=== Conversion to 15 inch gauge ===
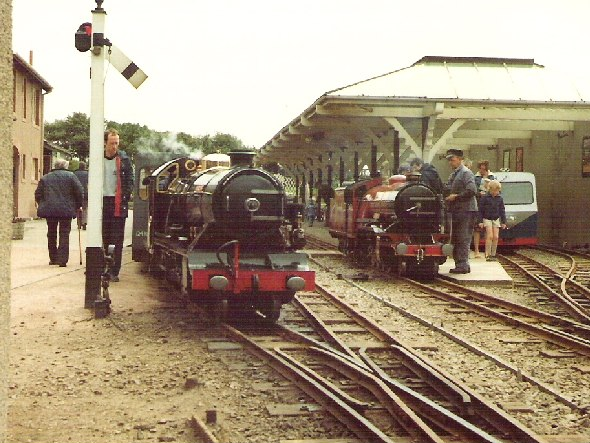
Ravenglass & Eskdale Rly 1981

In 1915, the abandoned railway was taken over by the model maker Wenman Joseph Bassett-Lowke and his business partner Robert Proctor-Mitchel. They began converting the line to the 15 in (381 mm) gauge that it is today. The first train operated over the regauged line on 28 August 1915, running initially to Muncaster Mill. By 1917, the entire line had been converted and trains were running along the whole length to Boot. However, the gradients on the final section of the line proved to be too steep for the smaller locos, and the railway was cut back to Beckfoot in 1918. Initially, services were operated using the Bassett-Lowke-built, 1/4 scale 4-4-2 Sans Pareil. This was later joined by another Bassett-Lowke loco, Colossus (a 4-6-2 version of Sans Pareil), as well as 2 locos and rolling stock from Sir Arthur Heywood's Duffield Bank line, following Sir Arthur's death in 1916. These were the 0-6-0 tank engine Ella, and the 0-8-0 tank engine Muriel, whose frames and running gear were later rebuilt as River Irt. Another Heywood loco, an 0-4-0 tank engine called Katie, was acquired from the Eaton Hall Railway in Cheshire, whilst another 4-6-2 tender loco, Sir Aubrey Brocklebank, was constructed for the railway, and named after the railway's financial backer, a wealthy shipping owner who lived nearby at Irton Hall.

As well as passengers, the line transported goods and mail to and from the valley. In 1922 a granite quarry was opened at Beckfoot, and the railway was used to transport the granite between Beckfoot Quarry and a crushing plant at Murthwaite. From 1929, the track between Murthwaite and Ravenglass was converted to dual gauge, with 4 ft 8 1/2 in (1,435 mm) standard gauge track straddling the 15 in (381 mm) gauge rails. A diesel locomotive was obtained in 1929 to work this section.

=== Brocklebank ownership ===
In the mid-1920s, the railway was taken over by Sir Aubrey Brocklebank, who also owned the quarry at Beckfoot. Under his ownership the line went through a number of changes. By 1926, the line had been extended along the route of the former Gill Force Tramway to its present terminus at Dalegarth Station. Large sections of the line were relaid with surplus rails from World War I light railways, and the railway was realigned in several places to remove some of the steepest gradients and sharper curves.

The station at Ravenglass was rebuilt to better handle the increasing number of passengers, and new steam and diesel locomotives were purchased to work the line, including River Esk (built in 1923), whilst the older locos were withdrawn and either rebuilt (in the case of Muriel into River Irt), or used to build new locos (in the case of the first River Mite). Following Sir Aubrey's death in 1929, control of the railway passed into the hands of his business partners, who lacked the local interest that Sir Aubrey had, and no further investment was made, other than what was needed for essential maintenance.

When World War II broke out in 1939, passenger trains were suspended for the duration of the conflict, and the steam locos were mothballed. Granite trains continued to run to support the war effort. In 1946, passenger trains began to run again using one of the diesels, with River Irt returning to service in 1947. River Esk did not return to service until the early 1950s, whilst the first River Mite had been permanently withdrawn and dismantled.

In 1949, the last of Sir Aubrey's business partners died, and the railway was sold to the Keswick Granite Company, who wanted to gain control of the quarrying side of the business. However, due to the lack of investment since the 1920s, much of the equipment in the quarry and crushing plant was worn out and in need of replacement. Rather than make the required investment, Keswick Granite chose to close the quarry in 1953, but kept the passenger trains running in the summer months. From 1958 attempts were made to sell the line as a going concern, but the asking price was too high. Finally in 1960, Keswick Granite announced that the railway would be sold by auction in September of that year. It was also announced that if a buyer could not be found for the line as a whole, then the railway would be closed and sold off as 60 separate lots.

=== Preservation ===
Locals and railway enthusiasts formed the Ravenglass and Eskdale Railway Preservation Society to save the line, with financial backing by Sir Wavell Wakefield, Member of Parliament (MP) for Marylebone and owner of the Ullswater Steamers, and Colin Gilbert, a stockbroker. These efforts were successful, and at the auction in September 1960, the society made the winning bid and saved the railway from closure. Control of the railway passed to a new private company, with the backing of the preservation society, an arrangement that is still in place.

When the new owners took control of the railway in 1961, the railway was in poor condition, suffering from the lack of investment since the late 1920s. There were only two steam locomotives, River Esk and River Irt, both of which were well worn and in need of overhauls. To allow for an expanded timetable, the preservation society raised funds to build a third steam locomotive. River Mite (2-8-2) entered service in 1967 and, although owned by the society, has been on permanent loan to the company ever since. The two existing steam locos would be rebuilt with new boilers and tenders in the 1960s and 1970s.

In 1968, the death of Colin Gilbert led to the railway company becoming the property of Sir Wavell Wakefield, who by that stage had become Lord Wakefield of Kendal. In the early 1970s it became apparent that, with passengers rising, another locomotive was required. This time the company constructed the locomotive itself. Northern Rock (2-6-2) was complete in time for centenary celebrations in 1976. A further addition was made in 1980 when the company constructed the B-B diesel locomotive Lady Wakefield.

Other significant locomotives include Bonnie Dundee, built in 1900 as a 2 ft (610 mm)-gauge tank locomotive before being donated to the R&ER by a member and converted to 15 in (381 mm)-gauge, later converted again from tank to tender configuration; Synolda, (renamed Prince Charles) a twin to the original 15 in (381 mm) loco Sans Pareil, built in 1912, saved from Belle Vue Zoo in 1978 and now in the railway museum; Shelagh of Eskdale, a 4-6-4 diesel built in 1969 incorporating parts of the Heywood loco Ella; Perkins, a rebuilt 0-4-4DH locomotive, which started as a quarry shunter before being rebuilt into the steam-outlined Passenger Tractor and then again in 1984 into its current guise; Douglas Ferreira, a B-B diesel loco constructed in 2005 and named after the general manager of the R&ER from 1961 to 1994. The most recent addition to the loco fleet is Whillan Beck, a 4-6-2 tender loco built by Krauss in Munich in 1929, which entered service at Ravenglass in 2018.

Since the 1960s, the condition of the railway has been significantly improved and visitors have increased. Most of the work to rebuild the railway was overseen by Douglas Ferreira, who was the general manager between 1961 and 1994. Today, there are 120,000 passengers each year with up to 16 trains daily in summer. Trains run most of the year; the railway is only closed in January.

In October 1998, the railway's engines River Mite, Northern Rock, and Cyril were taken to Germany for a period of excursions on the Dresden Park Railway, a former Pioniereisenbahn in Dresden. Whilst in Dresden, the locomotives ran with two of that lines Krauss & Co. built locomotives dating from 1925. In 2016, the R&ER was able to purchase a sister engine, built by Krauss & Co. in 1929 for the Ibero-American Exposition of 1929 in Seville, Spain. Since its arrival in Cumbria, this locomotive has been named Whillan Beck.

In early 2020, the railway was forced to temporarily suspend all trains due to the COVID-19 pandemic and the subsequent UK-wide lockdown. This was the first time since the Second World War that passenger trains had been forcibly suspended for such a prolonged period. Following the relaxation of lockdown restrictions in July 2020, passenger trains resumed on 30 July.

=== Gilbert's Cutting ===
After passing Spout House Farm the line reaches Gilbert's Cutting. Until 1964, trains were forced to follow a sharp curve along a contour in order to avoid steep gradients. Using "opencast gelignite" to blast through the rock, the cutting was constructed to a 300-foot radius ten feet wide at rail level with steep sides exposing Eskdale pink granite on the inside curve. Its construction alleviated the sharp curve at Holling Head of 145 foot radius which caused excessive wear and tear on the locos and track. 3,000 tons of rock and earth was removed and about 700 feet of track was re-laid. By diverting the line through the new cutting the length of the line was reduced by 87 3/4 feet making the total length 6.91 miles.

On Friday 27 March 1964, the 11:20am train from Ravenglass hauled by River Irt and driven by the managing director of the Railway Company Colin Gilbert, stopped at the Western entrance to the cutting. Mr Patrick Satow, the Chairman of the Ravenglass and Eskdale Railway Preservation Society, who was travelling in the cab with Mr Gilbert and Mr Postlethwaite the landowner, cut the ribbon and formally named the cutting "Gilbert's Cutting" in honour of Colin Gilbert.

== Present operations ==
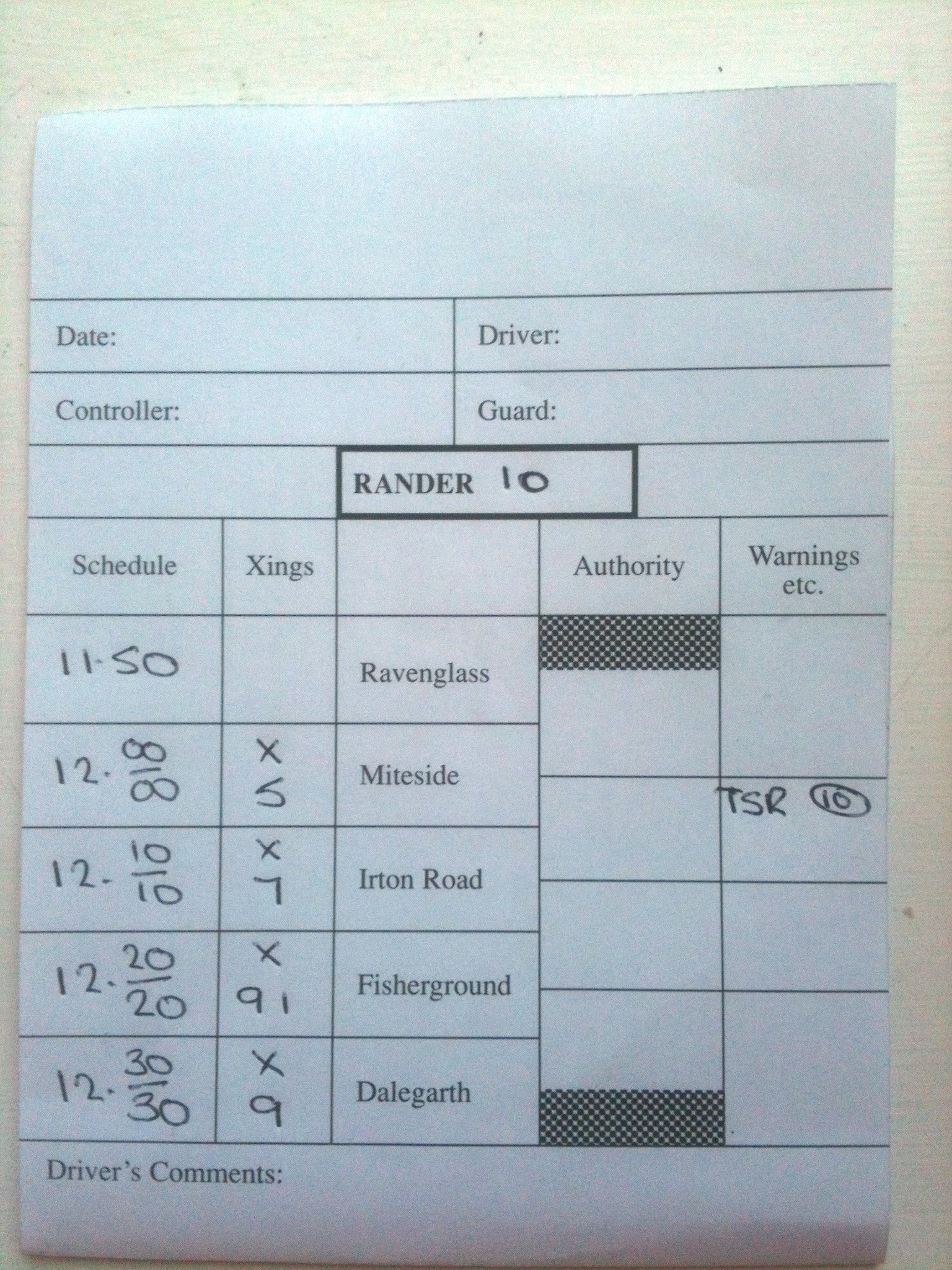
A RANDER board, issued to a train's driver and guard by the duty controller.

Today, the railway is a popular visitor attraction in the Lake District, with the majority of its annual passenger numbers coming during the summer months. The entire single journey takes 40 minutes from end-to-end. Passengers can choose between open and covered seating, with some saloon coaches being fitted with heaters for the winter months. Disabled passengers and cycles can also be conveyed by the trains. The locomotives are 1/3 scale models of mainline locomotives and are air-braked at 50 psi. There are over a hundred regular volunteers that help with the running of the railways, which include guarding the trains, carriage shunting and selling tickets at the major intermediate stations along the route.

=== Signalling system ===
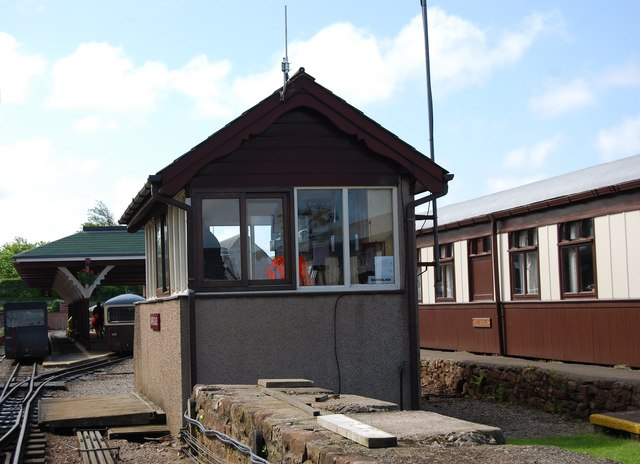
Signal box, Ravenglass and Eskdale Railway

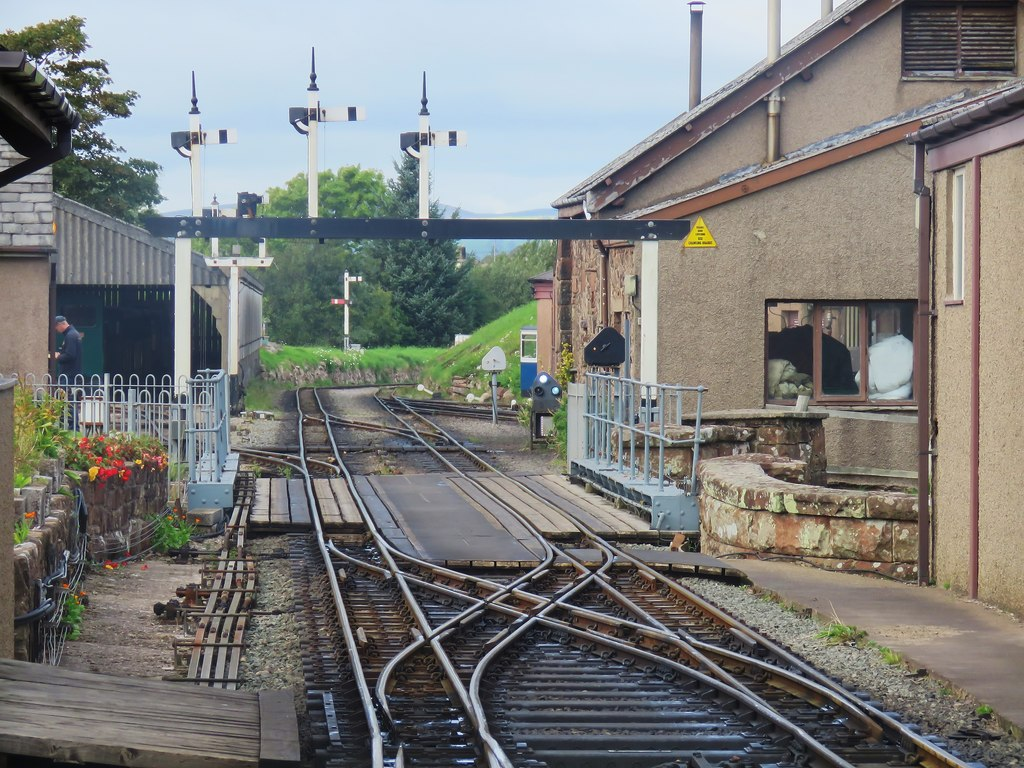
Signals and crossover at Ravenglass

The railway uses the Radio Control Train Order signalling system. Outside Ravenglass station, the line is single track with passing loops at Miteside, Irton Road and Fisherground. Trains operate by radio communication between drivers and at Ravenglass signal box. At passing loops and the terminus station, drivers contact the controller, using "RANDER" reporting numbers (even numbers for up trains, and odd for down), to indicate that the train is within the loop and is clear of the preceding single track. To leave the loop, the driver contacts control to gain authorisation to enter the next single track section. No semaphore signals are used outside Ravenglass station. Points at passing loops are weighted with direction indicators, meaning that no human intervention is required and the points reset themselves automatically after the passage of a train when entering the points from a trailing direction when the points are set for the other rail line.

Elements of the operation were used by British Rail to cut costs on remote lines. What became known as Radio Electronic Token Block signalling shared features with the Ratty, such as centralised control, automatic points at loops, and on-train equipment rather than fixed equipment at remote locations.

On peak days in the summer months, two trains depart each end of the line per hour. Capacity on the railway allows for a service run at 20-minute intervals.

=== Ownership ===
The railway company is in common ownership with the Ullswater 'Steamers', a company that operates lake cruises on Ullswater in the north-eastern part of the Lake District. Both companies form part of the Lake District Estates group, which also owns various tourist oriented properties in the area, and is controlled by Lord Wakefield's descendants.

== Stations on the route ==
Point	Coordinates (Links to map resources)	OS Grid Ref	Notes
Ravenglass (R&ER)	54.3559°N 3.4082°W	SD08589651	
Muncaster Mill	54.367°N 3.394°W	SD09529772	
Miteside Halt	54.371°N 3.384°W	SD10189815	
Murthwaite Halt	54.3785°N 3.3671°W	SD11299897	
Irton Road	54.3880°N 3.3299°W	SD13739998	
The Green	54.3868°N 3.3176°W	SD14539983	
Fisherground	54.3923°N 3.3037°W	NY15440043	
Beckfoot	54.3926°N 3.2824°W	NY16820043	
Dalegarth	54.3954°N 3.2748°W	NY17320074	

=== Ravenglass ===
Ravenglass railway station is the main terminus of the line: the other terminus is Dalegarth for Boot. Ravenglass station is the headquarters of the railway company and houses the railway museum, managerial offices and rolling stock maintenance facilities.

There is a turntable at the western extremity of the station's platforms, which doubles as the datum for mileage markers on the line. Ravenglass houses two locomotive sheds, on the southern side of the track, and a carriage shed on the northern side. There is a carriage & wagon workshop beyond Platform 1, opposite the signalbox. The Turntable Café is situated on Platform 1. The car park has spaces for 100 cars, as well as coaches. There are holiday accommodation facilities for weekly use, which consist of the Pullman camping coaches 135 Elmira and 137 Maid of Kent, and a holiday bungalow, the Hilton Cottage.

=== Muncaster Mill ===
Muncaster Mill is 1 mile or 1.6 kilometres from Ravenglass, adjacent to an historic corn mill (no longer open to the public). It is an unstaffed station, formerly known simply as Muncaster.

=== Miteside Halt ===
Miteside Halt is 1 3/4 miles (2.8 km) from Ravenglass. It is accessible only from a footpath that passes along Miterdale, at the foot of Muncaster Fell. The station shelter is the wooden hull of an old boat, the third such structure at the Halt.

=== Murthwaite Halt ===
Murthwaite Halt is 2 3/4 miles (4.4 km) from Ravenglass and is also only accessible from a footpath.

=== Irton Road ===
Irton Road is 4 1/4 miles (6.8 km) from Ravenglass, approximately halfway along the line. It was formerly known as Hollowstones, after the adjacent farm. There is a passing loop within the station and, consequently, two platforms. It has three sidings which branch off from the "up" loop – two of which run into a small shed, and the third of which is used for ballast and log traffic. There is a station building, which dates from 1875.

=== The Green ===
The Green, also known as Eskdale Green, is 4 3/4 miles (7.6 km) from Ravenglass. It was formerly known as King of Prussia after a local pub, then Eskdale Green, and since has changed between Eskdale Green and The Green several times. Has recently received a new picnic area.

=== Fisherground ===
Fisherground is accessible via a public footpath, adjacent to Fisherground campsite. It is 5 1/2 miles (8.9 km) from Ravenglass, just east of Fisherground loop.

=== Beckfoot ===
Beckfoot is 6 1/2 miles (10.5 km) from Ravenglass. Setting down is permitted only from trains travelling from Ravenglass, and picking up is permitted only on trains to Ravenglass.

=== Dalegarth for Boot ===
Dalegarth for Boot is a few yards short of 7 miles or 11.3 kilometres from Ravenglass and is the eastern terminus of the railway. It was formerly known as Eskdale (Dalegarth). There are two platforms and a turntable. The facilities at this station include Fellbites Café and the Scafell Gift Shop. A water supply to platform 1 allows topping up of the steam locomotive's tenders.

== Rolling stock ==
=== Locomotives ===
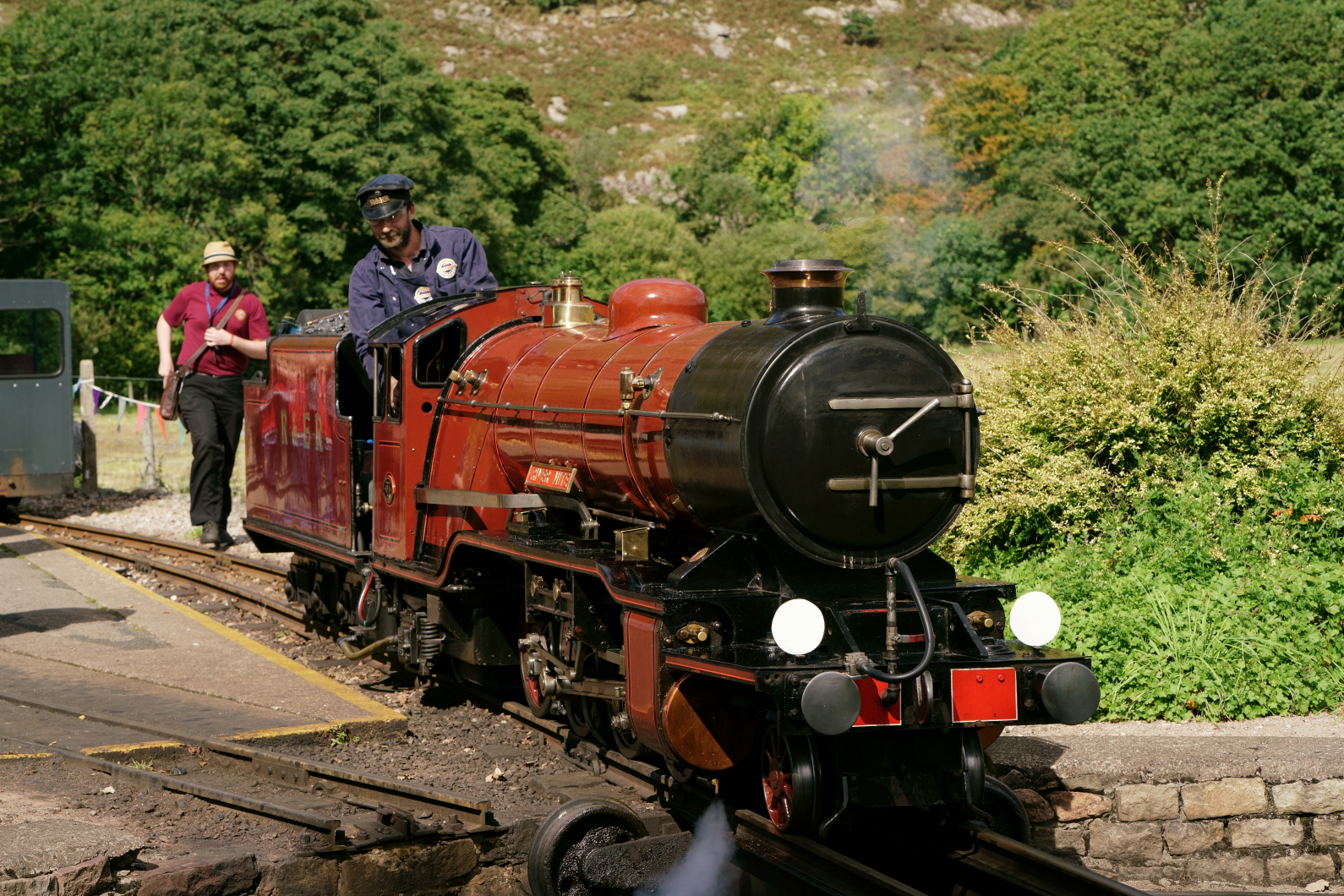
River Mite

The current fleet comprises:

No.	Name	Type	Wheels	Builder	Built	Arrival	Livery	Status	Refs
3	River Irt	Steam	0-8-2	Sir Arthur Heywood	1894	1917	Heywood Green	In service	
6	Katie	Steam	0-4-0T	Sir Arthur Heywood	1896	1916, 1982, 2017	Green	Owned by the R&ER Preservation Society. Operational, usually displayed in the museum.	
7	River Esk	Steam	2-8-2	Davey Paxman & Co.	1923	1923	Blackberry Black	In service	
9	River Mite	Steam	2-8-2	Clarkson & Sons	1966	1966	Indian Red	Owned by the R&ER Preservation Society. In service.	
10	Northern Rock	Steam	2-6-2	R&ER	1976	1976	Muscat Green	In service	
12	Whillan Beck	Steam	4-6-2	Krauss	1929	2016	Caledonian Blue	Owned by the R&ER Preservation Society. In service.	
N/A	Synolda	Steam	4-4-2	Bassett-Lowke	1912	1978	NGR Blue	Operational, usually displayed in the museum.	
N/A	Greenbat	Battery-Electric	4wBE	Greenwood & Batley	1957	1982	Yellow	Operational	
ICL 1	Bunny	Petrol-Mechanical	B-2	Francis Theakston	1927	1927	Green	On display in the museum	
ICL 5	Quarryman	Petrol-Mechanical	4wPM	Muir-Hill	1926	1926	Green	Operational, usually displayed in the museum	
ICL 4	Perkins	Diesel-Mechanical	4w-4	Muir-Hill	1929	1929	Yellow	In service	
ICL 7	Shelagh of Eskdale	Diesel-Mechanical	4-6-4DM	Severn-Lamb	1969	1969	Two-tone Green	Operational, at Romney, Hythe and Dymchurch Railway	
ICL 8	Lady Wakefield	Diesel-Mechanical	B-B	R&ER	1980	1980	BR Green	In service	
ICL 9	Cyril	Diesel-Mechanical	4wDM	R.A. Lister	1932	1985	Green	Owned by the Murthwaite Locomotive Group. Station shunter.	
ICL 10	Les	Diesel-Mechanical	4wDM	R.A. Lister	1960	1999	Green	Workshop pilot	
ICL 11	Douglas Ferreira	Diesel-Hydraulic	B-B	TMA Engineering	2005	2005	Indian Red	Owned by the R&ER Preservation Society. Under repair.	

=== Passenger carriages ===
The operational passenger stock of the railway currently comprises the following –

- 7 20-seat heated saloons (102; 110; 111; 113–115; 136)
- 2 18-seat heated saloons (106; 107)
- 1 14-seat heated brake saloon (112)
- 3 20-seat saloons (119; 121; 122)
- 2 14-seat brake saloons (104; 120)
- 1 16-seat brake saloon (103)
- 1 22-seat heated "maxi" brake saloon (133)
- 1 20-seat heated "maxi" special saloon (130 Eskdale Belle)
- 1 17-seat heated disabled saloon (118)
- 1 14-seat heated disabled saloon (138)
- 2 19-seat disabled saloons (123; 137)
- 7 20-seat semi-opens (101; 108; 109; 116; 117; 124; 125)
- 3 20-seat disabled semi-opens (127–129)
- 8 20-seat opens (166; 269–469; 170–370; 387)
- 5 18-seat brake opens (169; 271; 371; 199; 287)
- 1 14-seat heated observation saloon (131 Joan)
- 1 12-seat heated director's saloon (132 Ruth)
- 1 18 seat heated first class saloon (140)

Open coach 287 is owned by the Ravenglass and Eskdale Railway Preservation Society and is hired to the railway.

=== Other vehicles ===
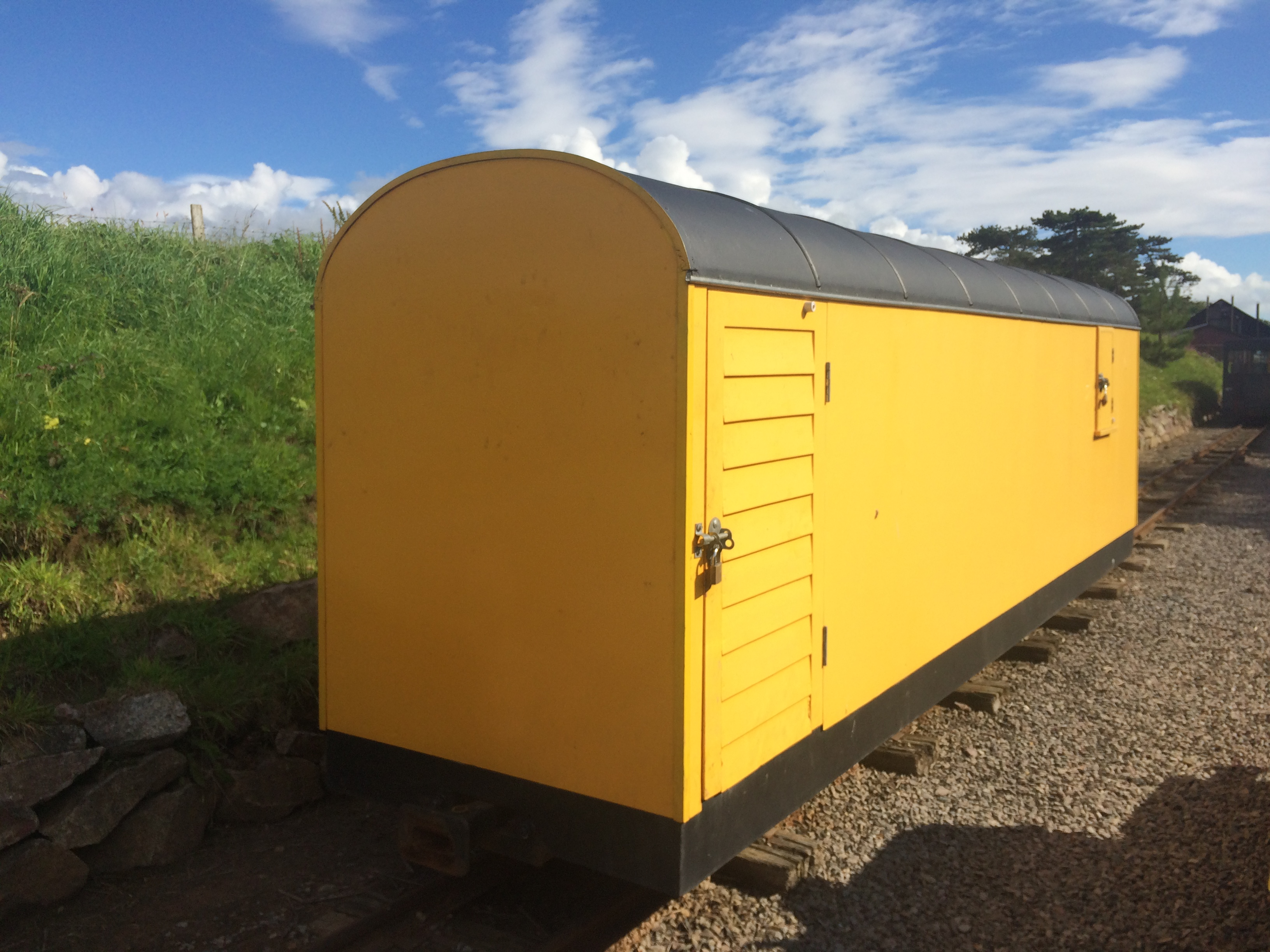
A utility van for use by engineers.

The permanent way department currently utilises nine four-wheeled flat wagons, eight of which have removable tops for ballast carrying, a four-wheeled railbender wagon, a bogie man-rider wagon, two bogie flat wagons, a utilities van, and a mess saloon coach (105).

== The line in fiction ==
The Arlesdale Railway in The Railway Series by the Rev. Wilbert Awdry is based on the Ravenglass and Eskdale Railway. In Small Railway Engines (1967), Awdry relates part of a holiday he spent visiting the Ravenglass and Eskdale Railway with the Rev. Edwin Boston; the two appear in the book as the Thin Clergyman and the Fat Clergyman, respectively. The Arlesdale Railway was also the focus point in Jock the New Engine, with an incident that was inspired by an accident that happened on the Ravenglass and Eskdale Railway, when Perkins crashed in the back of the shed, and with cameos in other books.

The fictional railway's locomotives are each based on Ravenglass locomotives: Bert, Rex, Mike and Jock are the steam locomotives River Irt, River Esk, River Mite and Northern Rock, while the Sudrian diesels Frank, Sigrid of Arlesdale and Blister 1 & 2 are the Cumbrians Perkins, Shelagh of Eskdale and Cyril. The Arlesdale Railway stations are also visibly based on the Ravenglass ones: Arlesburgh is Ravenglass, Ffarquhar Road is Muncaster Mill, Marthwaite is Irton Road, Arlesdale Green is Eskdale Green and Arlesdale is Dalegarth. Bert, Rex and Mike first appeared in the Thomas & Friends TV Series in the special Sodor's Legend of the Lost Treasure and later appeared in Season 20.

The line features in The Plague Dogs by Richard Adams; the canine protagonists evade the force of paratroopers searching for them by riding from Eskdale to Ravenglass on an empty train.

In the first two instalments in the RollerCoaster Tycoon franchise of theme park simulation series, RollerCoaster Tycoon and RollerCoaster Tycoon 2, the model for the basic "miniature railway" ride is based on the engine No 10 Northern Rock.

== See also ==
- Duffield Bank Railway
- Eaton Hall Railway
- Romney, Hythe and Dymchurch Railway
- Sand Hutton Miniature Railway
- Shuzenji Romney Railway in Japan
- Bush Mill Railway
