= Dalegarth railway station =

Railway station in Cumbria, England

Dalegarth Eskdale
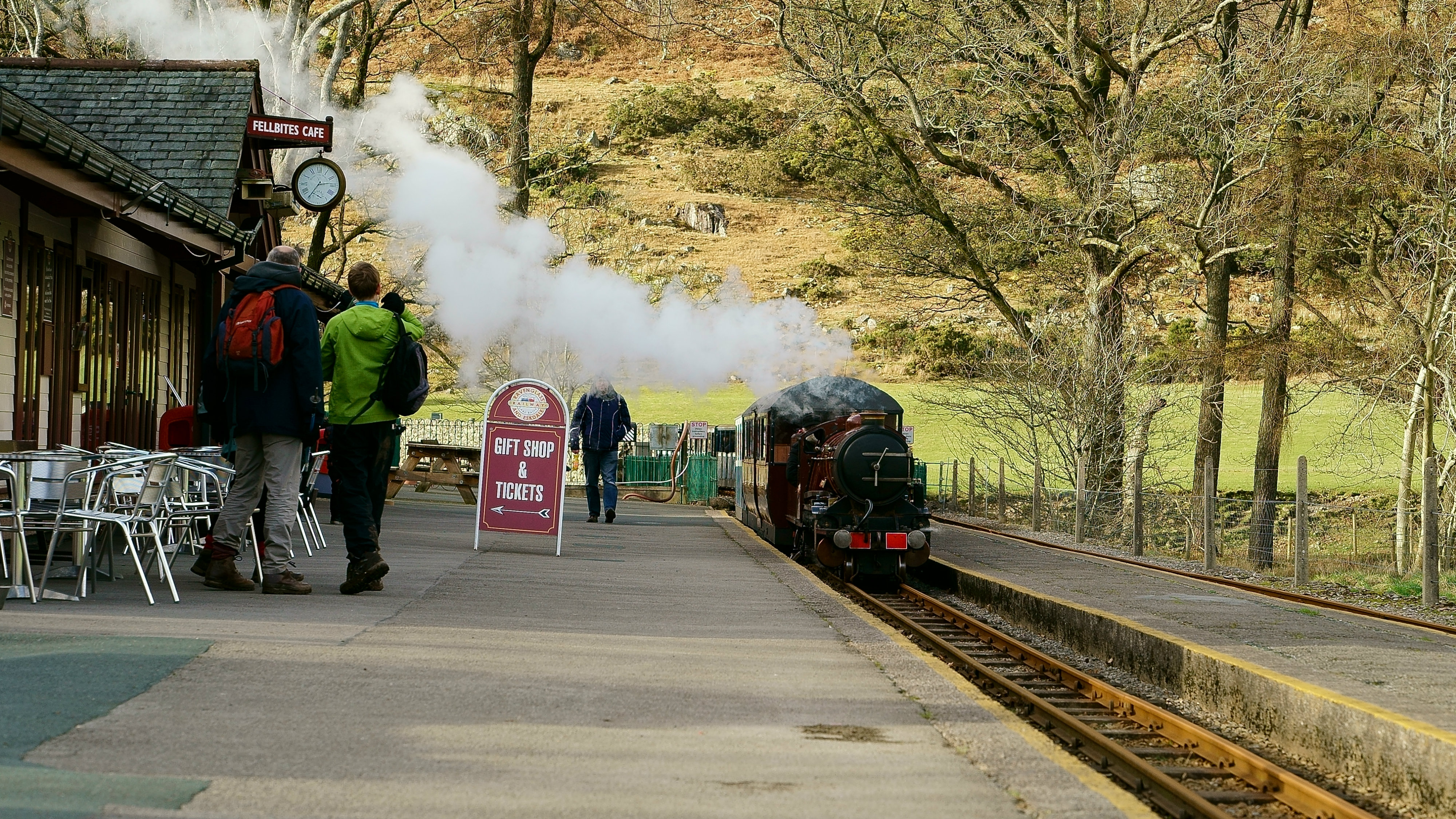
- River Mite arrives at Dalegarth, February 2016

General information
- Location: Boot, Eskdale, Cumbria; England
- Coordinates: 54.396°N 3.275°W
- Grid reference: NY 174 008
- System: Station on heritage railway
- Owner: R&ER
- Operator: R&ER
- Manager: R&ER
- Platforms: 2

Key dates
- 1918: Opened
- 1920s: Relocated
Location
- Location within the former Borough of Copeland Location within Cumbria

Dalegarth railway station is the easterly terminus of the 15-inch gauge Ravenglass and Eskdale Railway in the English county of Cumbria. It has a café and shop for passengers, along with a run-round loop, turntable and siding for trains.

The station is situated near the village of Boot in the civil parish of Eskdale and the Lake District National Park. It lies between the Whillan Beck, a tributary of the River Esk, and the road from Ravenglass to Windermere, via the Hardknott and Wrynose passes.

== History ==
In the days of the 3 ft gauge line, the line's terminus was near Eskdale Mill in the village of Boot, with a freight-only branch leaving the main line just after Beckfoot station and curving to the right across the Whillan Beck, the valley road and River Esk to the Gill Force hematite mine. However soon after the conversion of the line to 15-inch gauge, it became apparent that the miniature locomotives could not cope with the gradient on the final stretch of the line into the Boot terminus, and in 1918 the line was diverted onto the less steep former freight branch. The former route to Boot can still be seen and walked.

Initially the diverted line terminated in front of the nearby miners' cottages (now home to employees of the railway). By 1926 it had been extended, still on the trackbed of the old mine branch, over the Whillan Beck to just before the crossing over the valley road, and a station built on the site between beck and road. For about 80 years, the station building was a converted second-hand hut from the weapons testing establishment at Eskmeals near Ravenglass.

The current building, utilising its railway embankment site to create a split-level layout with an education/meeting suite below the main café and shop area, was opened on 21 April 2007 by music producer and railway enthusiast Pete Waterman.

== Facilities ==
The current station has two platforms alongside a pair of tracks. The tracks terminate at a turntable at the eastern extremity of the line, where locomotives can be seen detaching from the rolling stock and coupling onto the other end for the return journey to Ravenglass. There is also a water tank at the western end of platform 1.

The upper level of the station building fronts platform 1 and houses the Fellbites Eatery and Scafell Gift Shop (which also acts as a booking office) that are open when the railway are running scheduled passenger trains. There are toilets on both levels of the station. The station also has paid car parking on site, with electric car charging facilities.

The village of Boot is a 5-minute walk from the station, and is home to the Eskdale Mill (a restored water mill) as well as two pubs (the Boot Inn and the Brook House Inn).

== Gallery ==
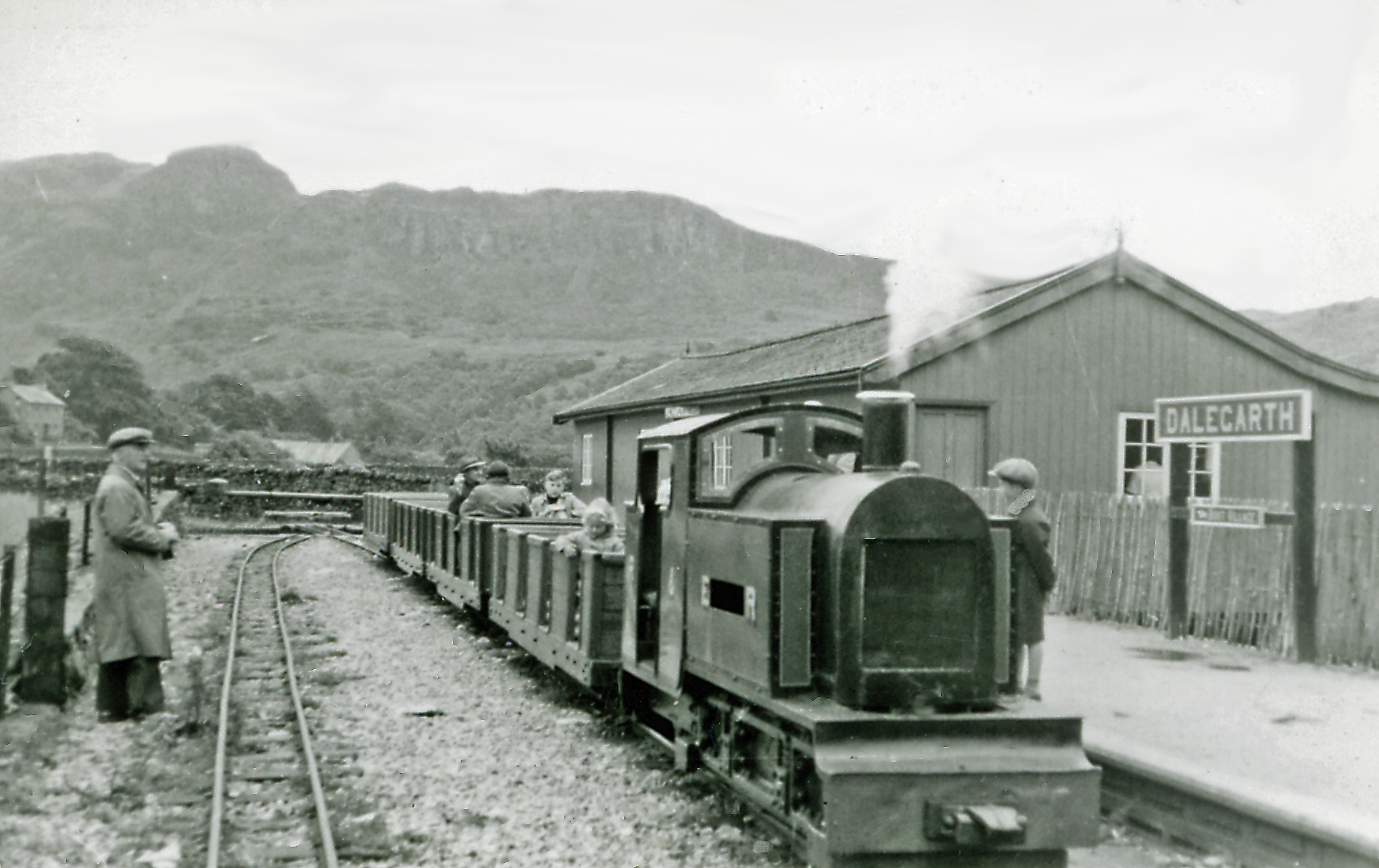
Train ready to depart station, August 1951

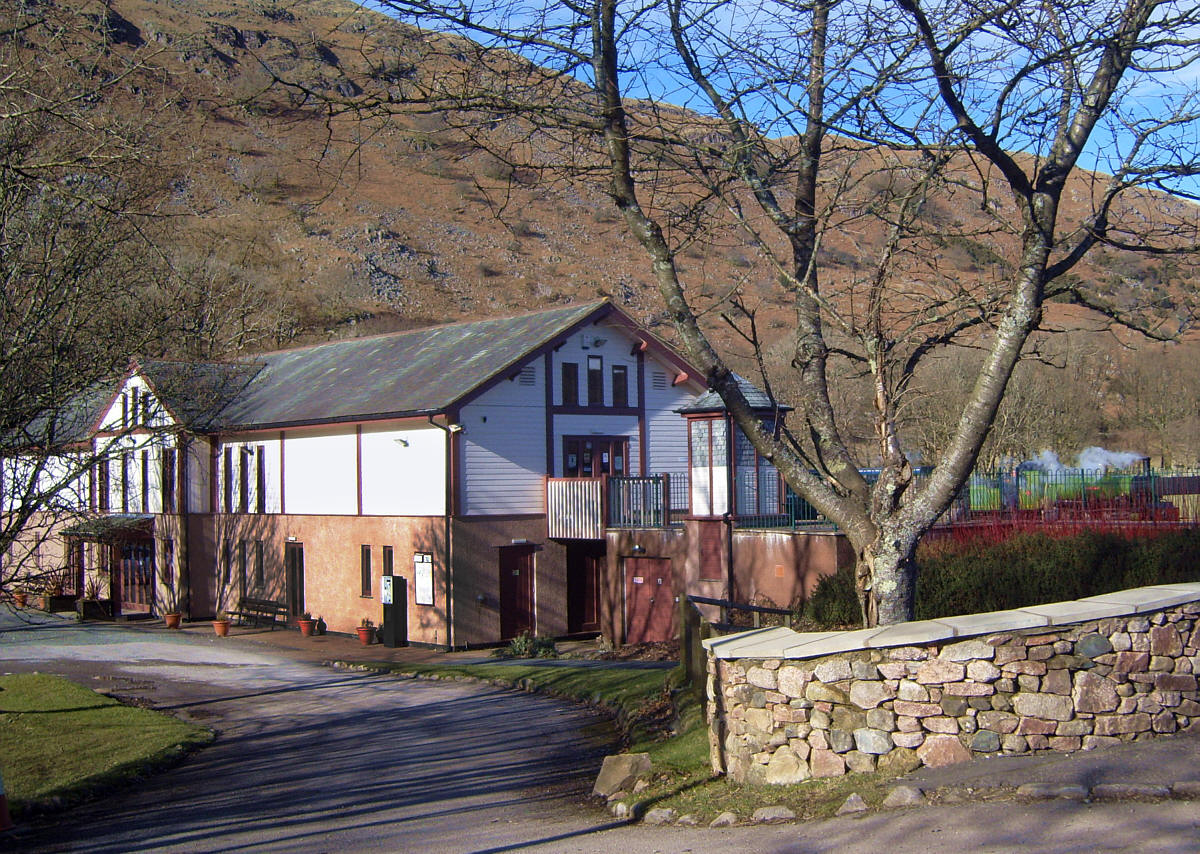
The station building, February 2010

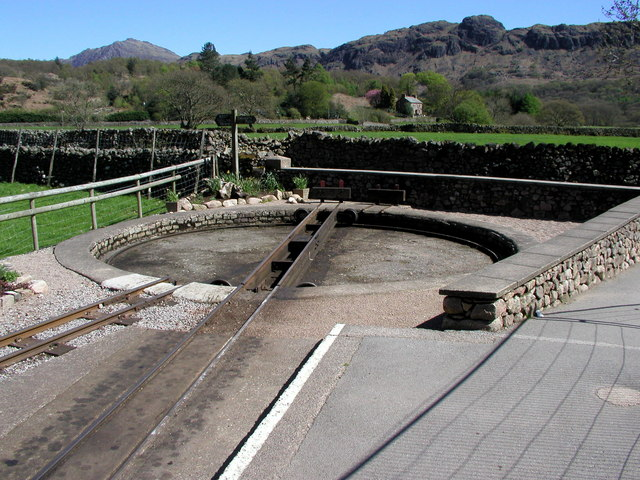
The turntable, May 2006

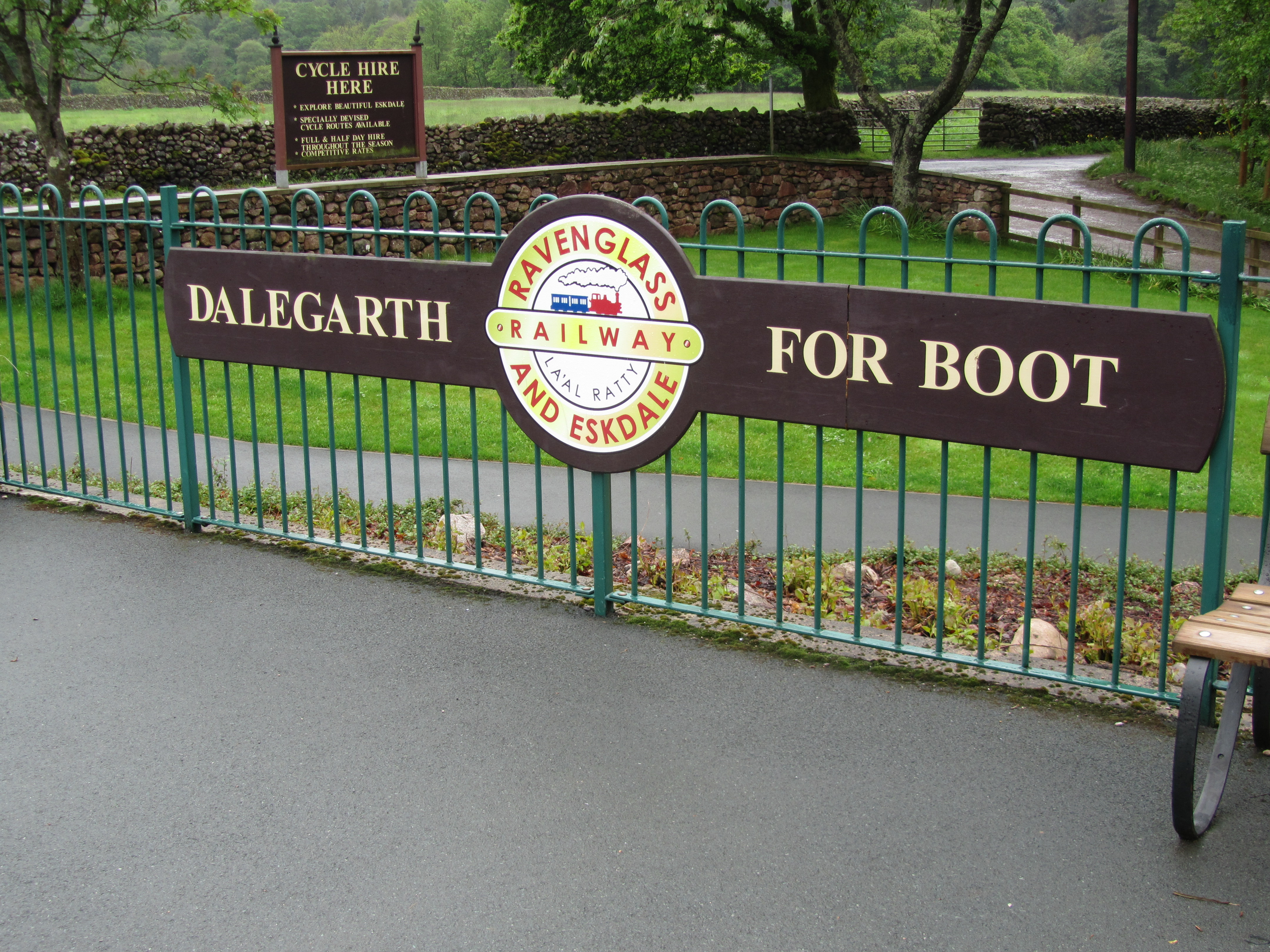
The station sign, May 2011

Preceding station	Heritage railways	Following station
Beckfoot towards Ravenglass	Ravenglass & Eskdale Railway	Terminus
