= Ravenglass (R&ER) railway station =

Heritage railway station in Ravenglass, Cumbria, England

Ravenglass
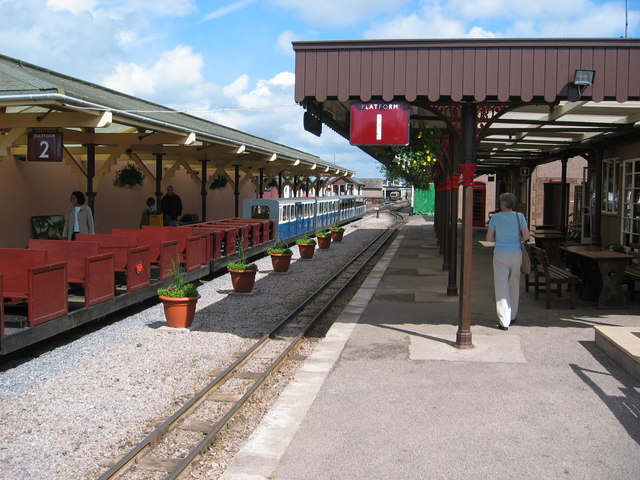

General information
- Location: Ravenglass, Cumberland; England
- Coordinates: 54.355968°N 3.40964°W
- System: Station on heritage railway
- Owner: R&ER
- Operator: R&ER
- Manager: R&ER
- Platforms: 3 (platform 2 disused)

Key dates
- 1876: Opened (3 foot gauge)
- 1913: Station closed
- 1916: Reopened (15 in gauge)
Location

Ravenglass Heritage Railway Station is the western terminus of the Ravenglass and Eskdale Railway. It is to the east of Ravenglass main line railway station, which is on the Cumbrian Coast Line. The facilities at the railway station include toilets, under-cover platforms, booking office and café. The railway station complex incorporates 2 locomotive sheds, a carriage shed, a signal box, managerial offices and 2 camping coaches; along with the railway station itself.

== History ==
The narrow gauge railway station at Ravenglass was originally built in 1876 when the original 3 ft (914 mm) gauge railway opened to passenger traffic to Boot. The original station consisted of a large wooden built train shed covering one track and the platform. Additional sidings were used for goods traffic. In the days of the 3 ft (914 mm) railway, there was no run-round loop or turntable. Running round was achieved by gravity shunting.

The 3 ft (914 mm) gauge structure was used by the Narrow Gauge Railways 15" conversion in 1915, with additional lines and a turntable being added over the next ten years. The train shed was eventually demolished in 1927 and a new platform, waiting shelter, and four lines leading to the turntable was built. This new layout originally had an island platform which was removed and a fifth track added in the late 1930s. At this stage the tracks were packed with granite dust so only the rail head showed. The layout remained largely unchanged until the present company took over the railway in 1960.

When the new company took over in 1960, the waiting shelter was converted into a cafe for visitors. In 1966 the footbridge from Coniston was installed just before the turntable. The 1930s layout lasted until 1967 when the present two platform layout was adopted. The lever frame from Birgham signal box was installed in a box opposite the workshops and general manager's office (the 1927 bungalow) in 1968/9. In 1972, awnings were erected over platforms 2 and 3, recovered from Millom station. In 1978 a two storey toilet and office building was built next to the old waiting shelter on platform 1. Shortly afterwards, a second canopy was erected over platform 1, using fittings recovered from Whitehaven Station. A new ticket office and shop was built in 1983 next to the car park. The 1920s waiting shelter lasted until 2011, when it was replaced by a 2-storey cafe similar in style to the building built at Dalegarth in 2005.

== Present day ==
Today, Ravenglass station is a very busy station, with all of the passengers departing and alighting at this station. Consequently, there is always a minimum of one booking office clerk at Ravenglass station, when trains are in operation. The shop and booking office are adjacent to the car park. Memorabilia of the railway can be purchased also at the booking office complex.

There is a café and toilets on platform 1, adjacent to each other. Both platforms are under-cover and are decorated with various hanging plants. Prior to the first train of the day, volunteers clean the rolling stock and check the Daily Report Form sheets associated with each carriage set. Each train set is equipped with a variety of safety-critical appliances and material, including brakes on nearly all carriages and in the guards' compartment a first-aid kit, sanding equipment, fire-beaters and a rander board. The driver must have a separate rander board in order to proceed out of the station, on to the main line. Rander boards will only be given to the driver by the Controller, once the single-line section from Ravenglass to Miteside loop is considered to be occupied by that particular train, so as to meet the legal requirements of fixed absolute block railway signalling systems.

The signal box has an antenna protruding, which transmits and receives signals to and from locomotives on the line, via a booster and descrambler at Irton Road station.

Preceding station	Heritage railways	Following station
Terminus	Ravenglass & Eskdale Railway	Muncaster Mill towards Dalegarth
National Rail
Interchange with Ravenglass on the Cumbrian Coast Line

== Accessibility ==
Wheelchair users who wish to board the train here must pre-book a wheelchair space prior to the day of travel.
