= Gatehouse (disambiguation) =

A gatehouse is a type of building that stands at the gateway to a town, country estate, park, castle, or other fortification of importance.

Gatehouse or Gate House may also refer to:

== Buildings ==
- Gatehouse (waterworks), a building housing water control devices for a dam
- Gate House (Jupiter Island, Florida), a house in Florida, United States
- The Gatehouse, Baltonsborough, a house in Somerset, England
- The Gatehouse, Highgate, a public house in London, England
- The Gatehouse, Monmouth, a public house in Monmouthshire, Wales
- The Gatehouse, Norwich, a public house in Norfolk, England
- Gate House, Eskdale Green, a country house in Cumbria, England
- Gatehouse Prison, a former prison at Westminster Abbey in London, England
- Gatehouse School, an independent school in London, England
- Upstairs at the Gatehouse, a pub theatre in London, England

== Companies and organisations ==
- The Gatehouse (charity), a Canadian charity for victims of child abuse
- Gatehouse Bank, a UK bank based in London
- GateHouse Media, an American newspaper publisher

== Media ==
- The Gate House, a 2008 novel by Nelson DeMille

== People ==
- Adam Gatehouse (born c. 1950), English conductor
- Alexander Gatehouse (1895–1964), British Army officer
- Angharad Gatehouse, entomologist
- Charles Gatehouse (1877–1924), American football player
- Gabriella Gatehouse (born 1994), Brazilian-British model
- George Gatehouse (1864–1947), Australian cricketer
- James Gatehouse (1883–1949), Australian rules footballer
- Peter Gatehouse (born 1936), Welsh cricketer

== Places ==
- Gatehouse of Fleet, Dumfries and Galloway, Scotland

== See also ==
- Gatekeeper's lodge
