= Eskdale Green =

Village in Cumbria, England

Coordinates: 54°23′22″N 3°19′22″W

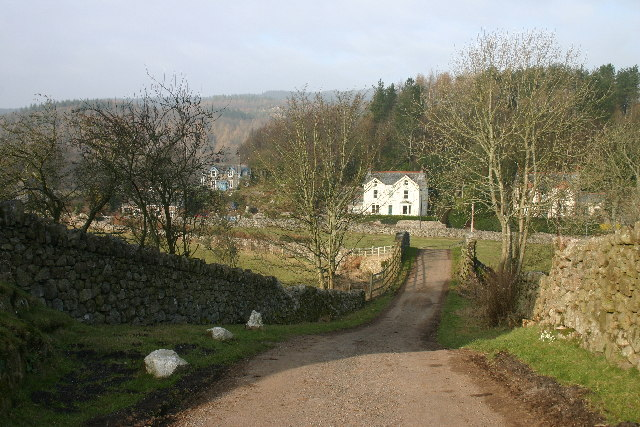
- Eskdale Green

- Location in Copeland Borough Location within Cumbria
- OS grid reference: NY141001
- Civil parish: Eskdale
- Unitary authority: Cumberland
- Ceremonial county: Cumbria
- Region: North West
- Country: England
- Sovereign state: United Kingdom
- Post town: HOLMROOK
- Postcode district: CA19
- Dialling code: 019467
- Police: Cumbria
- Fire: Cumbria
- Ambulance: North West
- UK Parliament: Barrow and Furness

Eskdale Green is a village in Cumbria, England, 10 miles west of Coniston. Historically in Cumberland, it lies off the A595 road and is one of the few settlements in Eskdale.

== Main sights ==
The village is centred on the small St. Bega's Church and hall. Since 1950 the Outward Bound Trust has owned Gate House mansion near the centre of the village, which they operate as an outdoor adventure and education centre for young people. In late summer the grounds of Gate House are the venue for the annual Eskdale Fête. The Gate House grounds used to encompass the Giggle Alley Forest, to the northwest of the village, which is now open to the public and contains 9 hectares (22 acres) of woodland, including a secluded Japanese garden designed by Thomas Mawson.

== Transport ==
The Ravenglass and Eskdale Railway has two stations in the village. Eskdale Green station (or The Green) is a short distance to the south of the village centre, while Irton Road station is at the western edge of the village, on the road to Irton Pike.

== See also ==
- Listed buildings in Eskdale, Cumbria
