= King of Prussia (disambiguation) =

King of Prussia may refer to:

== People ==
- A monarch of the former German state of Prussia
- John Carter (smuggler), an 18th century Cornish smuggler known as the "King of Prussia"

== Places ==
- King of Prussia, Pennsylvania, a census-designated place in Pennsylvania, United States
  - King of Prussia Mall, the fourth-largest shopping mall in the United States
- The Green railway station in Cumbria, England, originally known as "King of Prussia"
