= Irton Road railway station =

Railway station in Cumbria, England

Irton Road Hollowstones
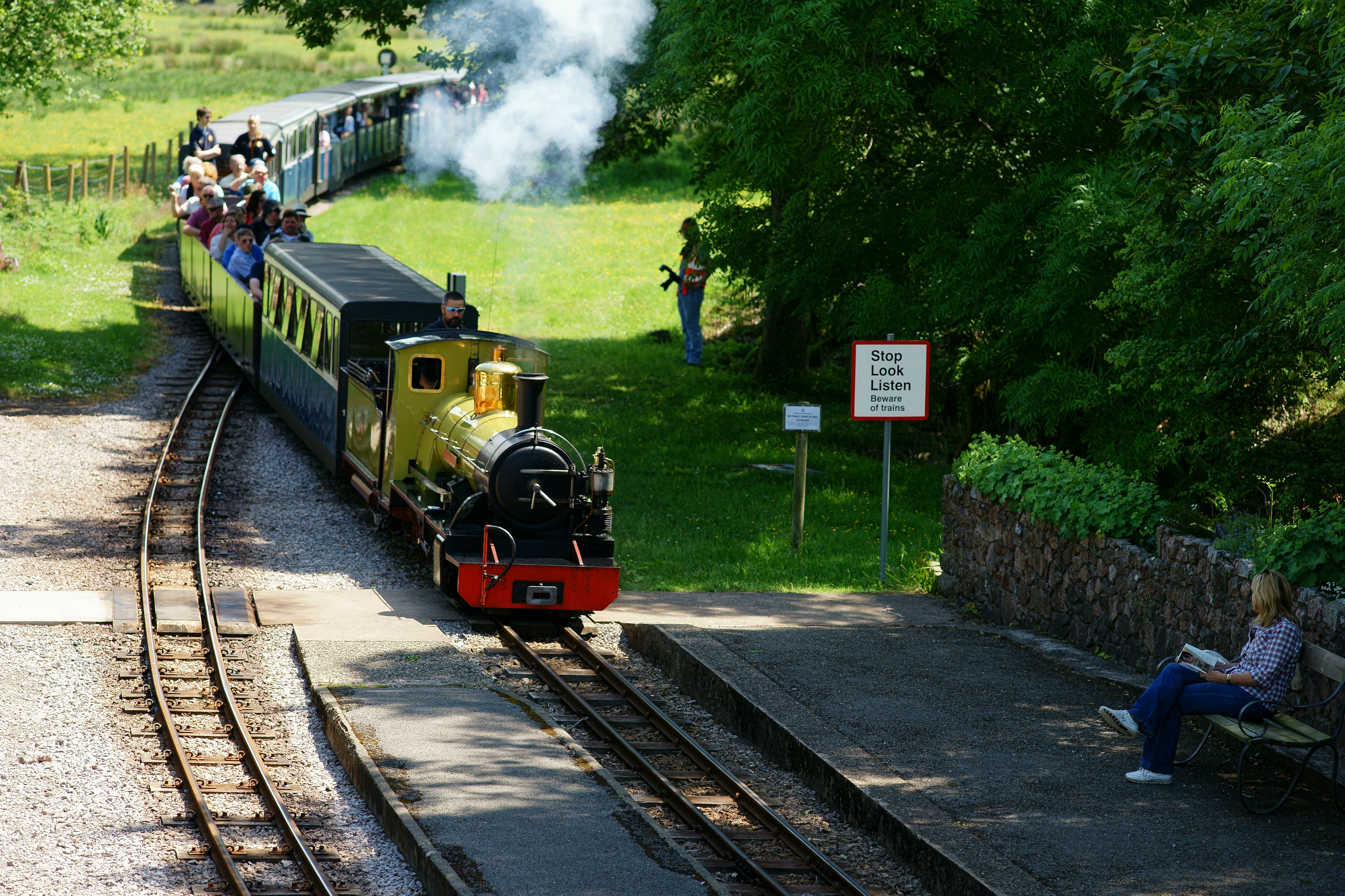
- Northern Rock arrives with a train for Ravenglass

General information
- Location: Eskdale Green, Cumberland; England
- Coordinates: 54.3880°N 3.3299°W
- System: Station on heritage railway
- Owner: R&ER
- Operator: R&ER
- Manager: R&ER
- Platforms: 2

Key dates
- 1876: Opened (3 ft gauge)
- 1913: Station closed
- 1916: Reopened (15 in gauge
Location

Irton Road railway station is a railway station on the 15 in gauge Ravenglass & Eskdale Railway in the Lake District National Park and the English county of Cumbria. The station is situated on the western edge of the village of Eskdale Green. It is some 4 miles (6.4 km) from Ravenglass and 3 miles (4.8 km) from Dalegarth for Boot, and trains take 20 minutes to reach their destinations in either direction from this station.

== History ==
Originally named Hollowstones, after the adjacent farm, it opened to passengers in 1876, when the line was still in its 3' gauge form. The station building was the only one on the line to be built from stone rather than wood, and as such, is the only station building to survive from the original railway. The station served the western end of the village of Eskdale Green as well as upper Mitedale, and as such, was one of the more important stations on the line for both passengers and local goods traffic. The station closed to passengers in 1908 and the goods traffic in 1913, but was reopened in 1916 as the railway was converted to 15 inch gauge. As well as becoming the main crossing point on the line, the station also hosted the railway’s carriage and wagon workshop, with a number of coaches being built/repaired at Irton Road before the construction of newer facilities at Ravenglass in the 1920s. For many years, Irton Road was the only practical passing place for trains between Ravenglass and Dalegarth. Consequently, the loop was extended to double the required length, to enable 4 trains to be accommodated at once, a feature the station retains to this day. Today, the station remains the main train crossing point on the line. The station also retains a storage shed and several sidings which are now used by the permanent-way department.

== Present day ==
Set in the heart of the Eskdale valley in Cumbria; today a host of different trains can be seen passing through the station in high season, including passenger, permanent-way and empty-carriage-stock trains. Most frequently seen are passenger trains, which run from Ravenglass to Dalegarth for Boot and vice versa. There are sidings here, which end in a two road shed, usually home to Quarryman, a paraffin-fuelled 4w engine formerly used on trains between Beckfoot Quarry and Murthwaite Stone Crushing Plant; Santa's Sleigh, used in the winter time during the Santa Specials and 627, an old coach dating from 1928, which is part of the heritage collection. A bridge over the station carries a metalled track from Irton Road to a farm named Hollowstones, which doubles as a public right of way for walkers heading south from the station.

When approaching by train from either direction, point indicators showing the lie of the weighted points can be seen when the train is approaching Irton Road railway station. The point indicators consist of a light on a black, circular background. A steady white light indicates that the weighted points are set for the train to enter the left-hand line of the two railway lines, while a flashing white light (rarely seen) indicates that the weighted points are set for the train to enter the right-hand line of the two railway lines. Exceptionally, no light illuminated either indicates that the weighted points are incorrectly set for either light-hand or right-hand train movements, or that there is some power or mechanical failure with the point indicators. These point indicators are normally inactive, only becoming active (illuminating) when a train passes a detection module, located on the track further back from the station than the point indicators.

Presently, only a shelter and a toilet are available for use by the public. Conversations from the radio transceiver inside the station master's office can sometimes be overheard by passengers waiting inside the shelter.

The station looks out on either side to grazing farmland, where sheep and cattle are a familiar sight. The road north of the railway line leads to Eskdale Green village in an easterly direction, where a convenience store, public toilets and a travelling post office on selected days can be found.

The journey to each end of the line is approximately 20 minutes in each direction, however the working timetable differs slightly in that the train takes 18 minutes to get to this station from Dalegarth, with a 2-minute stationary phase at Irton Road.

== Accessibility ==
Wheelchair passengers wishing to depart or alight here are advised to pre-book a wheelchair space prior to the day of travel.

== Telecommunications ==
A radio transceiver for the radio-controlled train order signalling system is located here. An analogue radio repeater is located within the booking office which is used to overhear conversations between driver and the controller (located in the signal box at Ravenglass). The railway uses a type of semi-duplex private business radio system, similar to the marine VHF system.

== Gallery ==
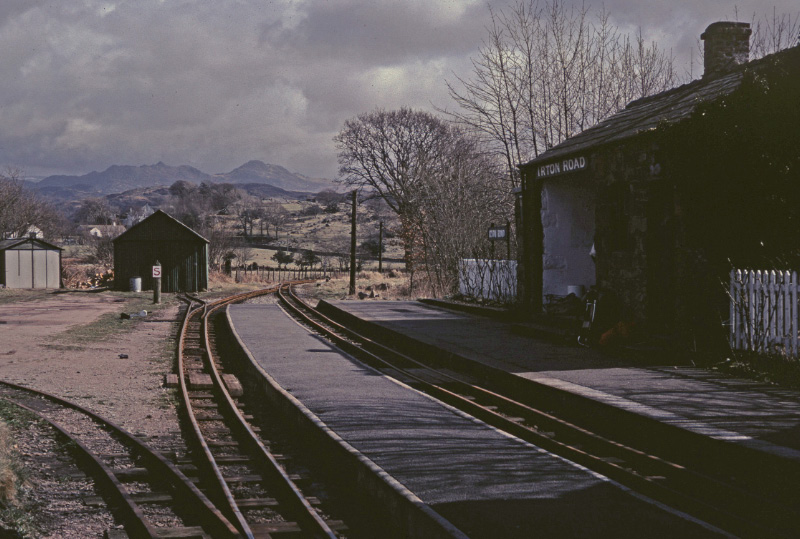
Irton Road looking towards the fells in 1979

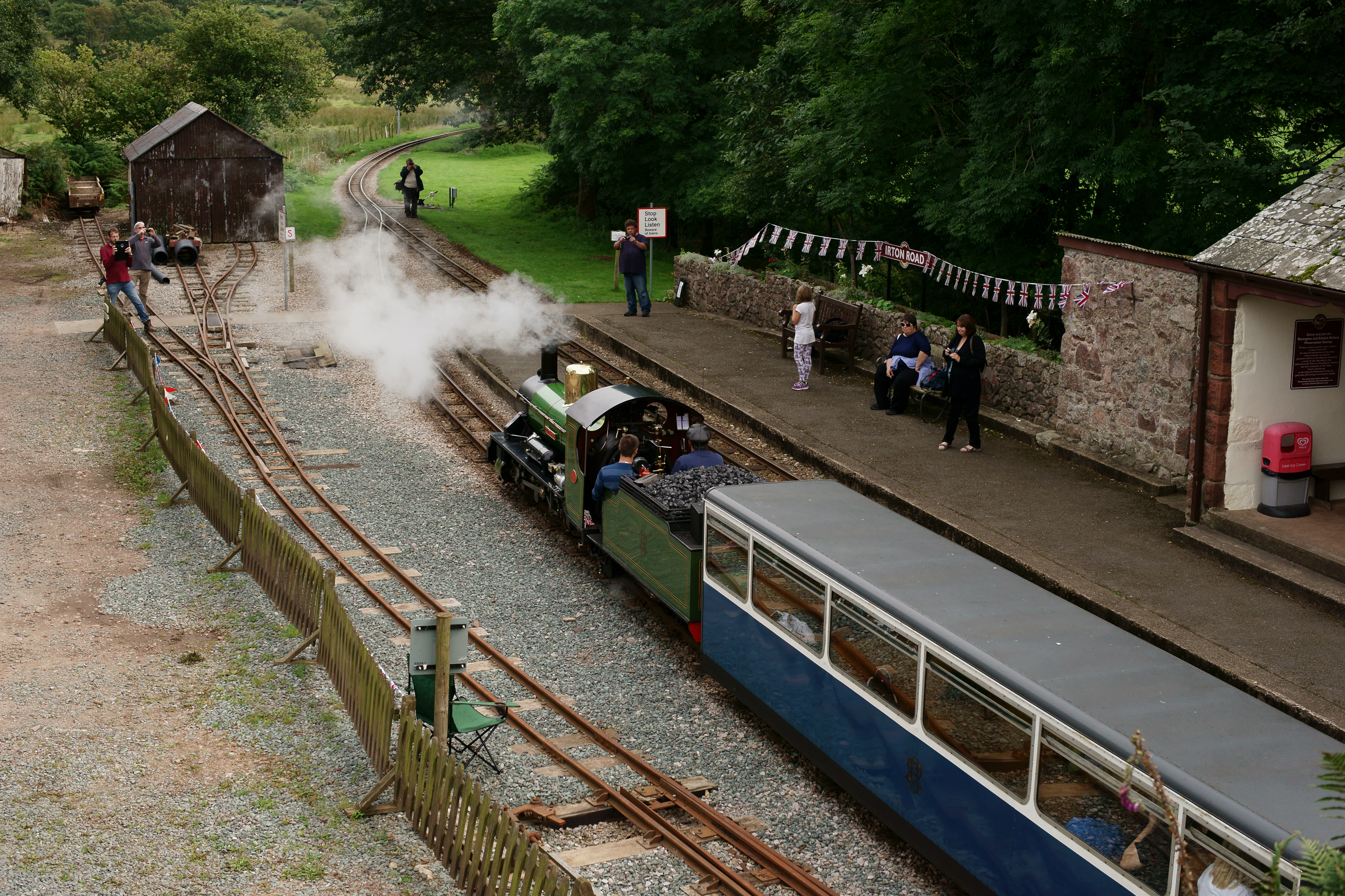
'River Irt' at Irton Road in 2015

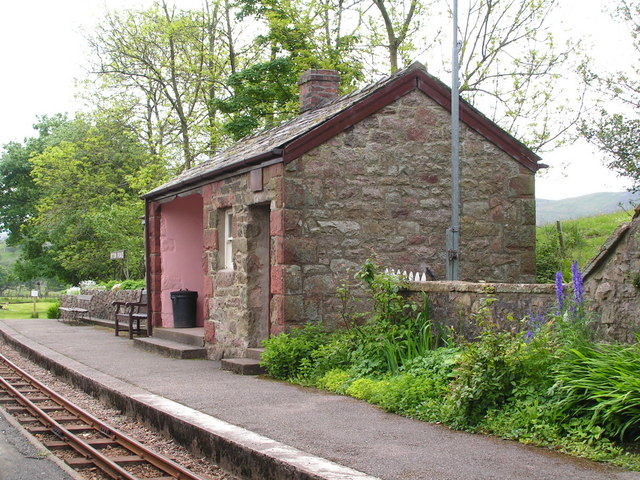
Irton Road Station booking office on Platform 1

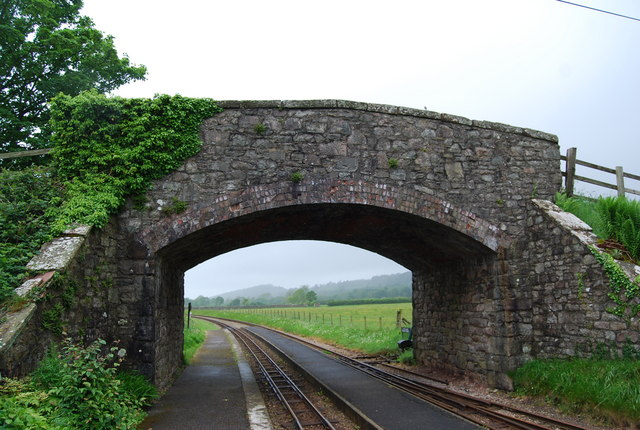
The bridge across the station

== See also ==
- Irton Pike

Preceding station	Heritage railways	Following station
Murthwaite Halt towards Ravenglass	Ravenglass & Eskdale Railway	The Green towards Dalegarth
