= Cecil Franks =

British solicitor and politician (1935–2014)

Cecil Simon Franks

Member of Parliament for Barrow and Furness
- In office 9 June 1983 – 16 March 1992
- Preceded by: Albert Booth
- Succeeded by: John Hutton

Personal details
- Born: 1 July 1935
- Died: 2 February 2014 (aged 78)
- Party: Labour (1952–65); Conservative (from 1965)
- Education: University of Manchester

Cecil Simon Franks (1 July 1935 – 2 February 2014) was a British solicitor and politician from Manchester. He was the Member of Parliament for Barrow and Furness from the 1983 General Election until the 1992 General Election.

Franks was born in Salford and was the son of George Franks, an estate agent and Labour councillor. After Manchester Grammar School he took an LL.B. at Manchester University, and was admitted as a solicitor in 1958. He went into property, and during the 1960s acted as legal adviser and promoter to a number of pop groups. Franks joined the Labour Party at 17, and in 1959 was its election agent at Knutsford. The next year he was elected to Salford council, sitting alongside his father; but in 1964 he was dropped as a candidate, alleging a plot against him by Left-wing members of the engineering union. He appealed to Transport House, and won. Franks joined the Conservatives the following year and was elected as a Tory councillor in 1966, and became leader of the council's Conservative group. After reorganisation in 1974 he sat on Manchester City Council, again leading the Tory group.

His election as Barrow's MP was somewhat of a surprise, given that he was a Conservative Party candidate in a traditional Labour Party heartland. In being elected, Franks defeated former cabinet minister Albert Booth.

The explanation for this was popular national support of the Conservative party for its support for military actions in the Falklands war. Barrow-in-Furness, the constituency's biggest town, is largely dependent on its Royal Navy contracts, and in particular, nuclear submarines (at VSEL, the area's major employer, even today) which played a leading part in the Falklands conflict. At the 1987 election, the Labour Party was still wanting to cancel Trident, this Labour policy was locally unpopular and Franks was able to hold on to this Labour 'safe-seat' for the next 4 years until 1992.

By 1992 the Labour Party was still planning to cancel the last Trident Submarine that was yet to be built, the Conservatives were still pro Trident. However, the electorate was not convinced enough that the loss of employment was sufficient to merit a vote for another Conservative MP. After losing his seat in Parliament, he did not stand for election again, and from 1995, involved himself working with various charities in opposing the processing of Amazon rainforest wood in China.

Franks, aged 78, died at his home near Altrincham on 2 February 2014. His first marriage, to Marlene Glick, was dissolved, and an adopted son predeceased him. He is survived by his partner of 24 years, Anne.

Parliament of the United Kingdom
Preceded by Albert Booth	Member of Parliament for Barrow and Furness; 1983–1992	Succeeded by John Hutton
