= Jonah Walker-Smith =

British politician (1874-1964)

Sir Jonah Walker Walker-Smith (22 November 1874 – 23 February 1964) was an engineer and a Conservative Party politician in England who served as member of parliament (MP) for Barrow-in-Furness from 1931, when he took it from Labour, until his defeat at the 1945 general election, when a Labour candidate took the seat.

He was born at Watford, Hertfordshire, son of John Jonah Smith, and educated privately and at King's College, London.

He trained as an engineer, becoming Member of the Institute of Civil Engineers and of the Institute of Mechanical Engineers. He also qualified as a Barrister-at-law and became Fellow of the Royal Institution of Chartered Surveyors and honorary Associate Member of the Royal Institute of British Architects.

He was successively City Engineer of Edinburgh; Director of Housing and Town Planning at the Local Government Board of Scotland; Consulting Engineer to the Road Board in Scotland; Director of Housing at the Ministry of Health from 1919 to 1925. He was knighted in the 1925 Birthday Honours.

In later life he held positions as managing director and chairman of various engineering and other companies.

== Personal life and death ==
He married, in 1905, Maud Coulton, daughter of Coulton Walker Hunter of Barrow-in-Furness and Barton Hall, Yorkshire, by whom he had a daughter, Joan, who predeceased him and two sons, one of whom Derek, also became an MP. His granddaughter by Joan is Lavender Patten, Hong Kong's final British 'first lady'.

Sir Jonah Walker-Smith died in February 1964, aged 89.

Parliament of the United Kingdom
Preceded by John Bromley	Member of Parliament for Barrow-in-Furness; 1931 – 1945	Succeeded by Walter Monslow
