= Simon Fell (politician) =

British Conservative politician (born 1981)

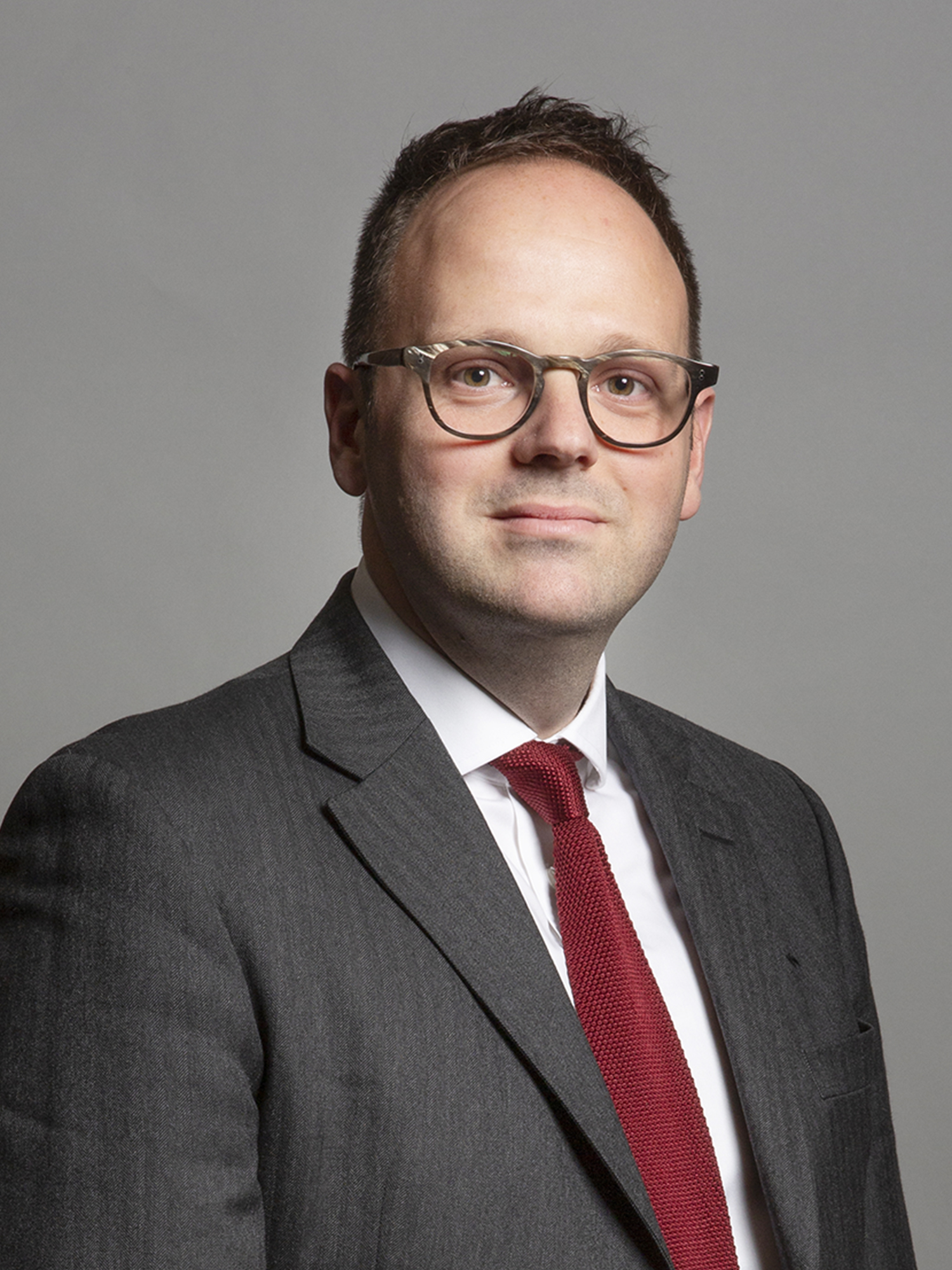

Member of Parliament for Barrow and Furness
- In office 12 December 2019 – 30 May 2024
- Preceded by: John Woodcock
- Succeeded by: Michelle Scrogham

Personal details
- Born: 9 February 1981 (age 45) Preston, Lancashire, England
- Party: Conservative
- Education: University of Warwick
- Website: simonfell.org

Simon Richard James Fell (born 9 February 1981) is a British Conservative Party politician, who served as the Member of Parliament (MP) for Barrow and Furness from 2019 to 2024.

== Early life and career ==
Fell was born in Preston in 1981, the son of Peter and Meriel Fell. He graduated with honours from the University of Warwick with a bachelor's degree in English literature. After his studies, he worked in the telecommunications sector, running a communications business, Irton-Fell Consultants, from 2006 to 2008.

He was then a regulatory affairs manager for Hutchison H3g from 2008 to 2011. He then began a period working for Cifas, a not-for-profit anti-fraud organisation. From 2011 to 2019, he was assistant director of strategy and policy, and in 2019, became director of external relations. Fell was chair of Barrow and District Credit Union from 2017 to 2019.

== Political career ==
Fell contested the marginal seat of Barrow and Furness at the 2015 and 2017 general elections, before winning the seat at his third attempt in 2019. At a 2015 hustings in Ulverston, he described himself as 'mildly-Eurosceptic'. However, he has since made clear that he supports Brexit, stating before his election in 2019 that "Brexit was the right decision for Barrow and Furness – it now needs a Conservative majority to see it delivered". He was the first Conservative MP to be elected for the seat since 1987.

In 2020, Fell supported the Transport Secretary's decision to revoke the franchise of Arriva Rail North "after years of poor performance."

In 2020, Fell organised a successful petition to prevent the closure of the Askam GP Practice.

From March 2020, Fell served on the Home Affairs Select Committee.

Fell withdrew his support of Former Prime Minister Boris Johnson on 6 July 2022 due to the recent controversies including Partygate and the Chris Pincher scandal

In December 2023, Fell was appointed as the Prime Minister's Anti-Fraud Champion.

In June 2023, Fell was appointed as the UK's first ever Rural Connectivity Champion.

Fell lost his seat in the 2024 general election to Labour candidate Michelle Scrogham.

== Prime Minister's Anti-Fraud Champion ==
Fell was appointed as the Prime Minister's Anti-Fraud Champion in December 2023. Announcing his appointment, then Home Secretary James Cleverly said: "His proven track record will allow us to build on our recent successes, which include reducing fraud by 13% and rolling out the world’s first ever Online Fraud Charter."

While in post, Fell launched the Government's Stop! Think Fraud awareness campaign, hosted the world's first Global Fraud Summit alongside G7 nations at Lancaster House, and represented the Government at the Home Affairs Committee. In 2024 he accompanied the Home Affairs Select Committee to Singapore in his role as Anti-Fraud Champion to meet Ministers and Officials and share insights on fighting fraud.

== Team Barrow ==
Fell had been arguing for a modern industrial strategy for Barrow-in-Furness since 2015, arguing at Conservative Party Conference in 2019 that the area required "a fair shake from the government" and "assistance in delivering a South Cumbrian industrial strategy that secures our future." This was a theme which Fell continued in his maiden speech in the House of Commons arguing for "the renewal of our town centre." Lobbying the Government, Fell secured over £25million in Town Deal and Levelling Up funding for the constituency and launched Team Barrow, bringing together the Government, Local Authority, and BAE Systems to argue for sustained and strategic funding for the peninsula. From 2024, then-Cabinet Secretary Simon Case chaired the Team Barrow meetings.

In March 2024, then Prime Minister Rishi Sunak announced a £220million 'Barrow Transformation Fund', recognising the unique role that Barrow-in-Furness plays in the nation's defence and its long track record of submarine production. Fell accompanied the then-Prime Minister and Chancellor to the shipyard in Barrow for the announcement.

== Campaign for Royal Barrow ==
Fell first raised the idea of creating a 'Royal Town of Barrow-in-Furness' in November 2022 in a Business Question to then-Leader of the House, Penny Mordaunt:

We recently celebrated 150 years of Barrow shipyard—not just the institution, but the men and women, past and present, who have worked there. It was once said to me that a nuclear submarine is the most technically complex thing that we build on the planet; in Barrow we are building many of them at the same time, which is tribute to the skills and ingenuity of the people working there. Those boats keep us and our NATO allies safe 24 hours a day, 365 days a year. Will the Leader of the House join me in paying tribute to the workers in our shipyard and agree that there is no more fitting tribute to the work that has gone on there and is going on now than awarding royal borough status to Barrow?

Working with local Radio Station CandoFM and local rotarian Brian Boyd, Fell launched a public campaign to gain recognition for the idea. A submission was made to the Cabinet Office by Fell in March 2024, featuring a campaign video, a petition with thousands of signatures, and letters of support from across the world. Fell spoke about the motivation behind the campaign in a speech to the Royal Society of St George in April 2024:

We deserve it - in respect for our service in the past, and the role that we - and our families, and their families, will play in the future.

An official announcement was made in March 2025 that The King was conferring Royal Charter Status to the Port of Barrow. Fell described himself as 'beyond delighted' at the news, thanking Cabinet Secretary Simon Case and the people of Barrow for their support.

== Offenders (Day of Release from Detention) Act 2023 ==
In December 2022, Fell introduced a Private Member's Bill into the House of Commons, calling for reform of prison legislation. The Offenders (Day of Release from Detention) Bill was designed to end the practice of vulnerable offenders being released from prison on Fridays. Speaking to the Bill, Fell described the issue he was attempting to resolve:

Many people released from prison, especially those released on Fridays, are almost set up to fail from the moment they set foot off the prison estate.

They face a race against time to access statutory and non-statutory services - to meet their probation officer, to visit a pharmacy or a GP, to sort out their accommodation, all on a Friday, with services closing early, with some being a distance away, or even impossible to reach by public transport."

Many end up homeless with no way of accessing services until Monday morning, with two-thirds of those without access to accommodation going on to reoffend within a year.

The Bill received support from prison reform charities such as NACRO and Switchback, and publications such as the Big Issue.

In June 2023, the Offenders (Day of Release from Detention) Act 2023 received Royal Assent.

== Post-parliamentary career ==
Following his defeat at the 2024 general election, Fell was appointed as Director of Fraud & Financial Crime at public affairs consultancy Fullbrook Strategies.

== Personal life ==
He and his wife Pippa, whom he married in 2009, have two sons and a daughter.

Parliament of the United Kingdom
Preceded by John Woodcock	Member of Parliament for Barrow and Furness; 2019–2024	Succeeded by Michelle Scrogham
