= John Hutton, Baron Hutton of Furness =

British Labour politician (born 1955)

The Right Honourable The Lord Hutton of Furness PC
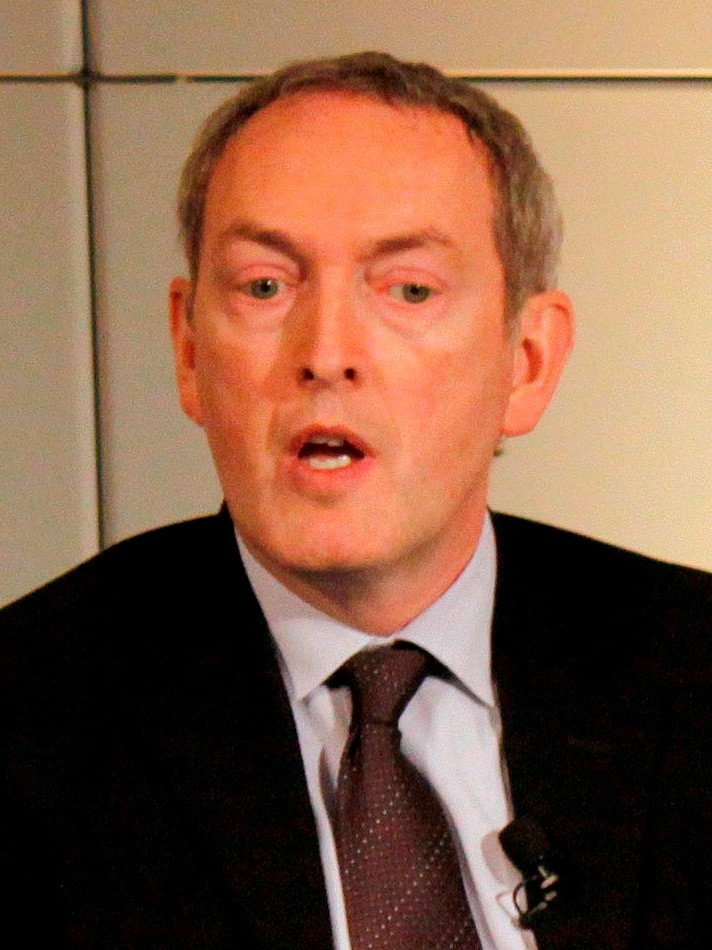
- Hutton in 2009

Secretary of State for Defence
- In office 3 October 2008 – 5 June 2009
- Prime Minister: Gordon Brown
- Preceded by: Des Browne
- Succeeded by: Bob Ainsworth

Secretary of State for Business, Enterprise and Regulatory Reform President of the Board of Trade
- In office 28 June 2007 – 3 October 2008
- Prime Minister: Gordon Brown
- Preceded by: Alistair Darling (Trade and Industry)
- Succeeded by: The Lord Mandelson

Secretary of State for Work and Pensions
- In office 2 November 2005 – 28 June 2007
- Prime Minister: Tony Blair
- Preceded by: David Blunkett
- Succeeded by: Peter Hain

Minister for the Cabinet Office Chancellor of the Duchy of Lancaster
- In office 6 May 2005 – 2 November 2005
- Prime Minister: Tony Blair
- Preceded by: David Miliband
- Succeeded by: Jim Murphy

Minister of State for Health
- In office 11 October 1999 – 6 May 2005
- Prime Minister: Tony Blair
- Preceded by: Tessa Jowell
- Succeeded by: Jane Kennedy

Parliamentary Under-Secretary of State for Health
- In office 27 October 1998 – 11 October 1999
- Prime Minister: Tony Blair
- Preceded by: Paul Boateng
- Succeeded by: Yvette Cooper

Member of Parliament for Barrow and Furness
- In office 9 April 1992 – 12 April 2010
- Preceded by: Cecil Franks
- Succeeded by: John Woodcock

Member of the House of Lords
- Lord Temporal
- Life peerage 27 June 2010

Personal details
- Born: 6 May 1955 (age 71) London, England
- Party: Labour
- Education: Magdalen College, Oxford (BA, BCL)

John Matthew Patrick Hutton, Baron Hutton of Furness, PC (born 6 May 1955) is a British politician and Labour member of the House of Lords. He served in several offices in the Cabinet of the United Kingdom; he was Work and Pensions Secretary from 2005 to 2007, Business Secretary from 2007 to 2008, and Defence Secretary from 2008 to 2009. A member of the Labour Party, Hutton was Member of Parliament (MP) for Barrow and Furness from 1992 to 2010. He was made a life peer in 2010.

== Early life ==
Hutton was born 6 May 1955 in London, though his family moved to Westcliff-on-Sea, Essex when he was eight. He was educated at Westcliff High School for Boys and Magdalen College, Oxford, where he joined the Conservative, Liberal and Labour Associations and gained a BA in 1976 and a BCL 1978. He worked for a year as a bus driver. For two years he was a legal adviser to the CBI. From 1980 to 1981, he was a research associate for Templeton College, Oxford. He went on to become a senior law lecturer at the Newcastle Polytechnic from 1981 to 1992 before turning back to politics.

== Parliamentary career ==
Hutton first stood for election in the Penrith and the Borders seat in 1987. Two years later, he also failed to be elected as a Member of the European Parliament (MEP) for the Cumbria and North Lancashire region. His election to the Barrow and Furness seat in the 1992 general election saw him replace Cecil Franks as MP with a majority of 3,578. His majority increased to 14,497 in the Labour landslide of the 1997 Election.

After being a part of the Department of Health from 1998, he was made a member of the Privy Council in 2001. In the reshuffle following the 2005 general election (in which his majority fell to just over 6,000), he was made Chancellor of the Duchy of Lancaster and Minister for the Cabinet Office, replacing his close friend and former flatmate, Alan Milburn.

His position in this role was short lived, however. Following the second resignation of David Blunkett, Hutton was appointed as his replacement in the role of Secretary of State for Work and Pensions on 2 November 2005. Hutton was seen as one of Tony Blair's closest supporters but survived in cabinet following Blair's resignation in June 2007 and was moved by new Prime Minister Gordon Brown to be Secretary of State for Business, Enterprise and Regulatory Reform, which role incorporated the bulk of portfolios from the now dissolved Department of Trade and Industry, including energy security issues, which many had expected to be ceded to DEFRA. In 2007 he asked the economist DeAnne Julius to undertake a review of the public services industry, which was published in July 2008. He welcomed her report and was supportive of her view that private sector service provision and competition could help improve public services.

In September 2006, while discussing the forthcoming Labour Party leadership election, Hutton gave an anonymous quote to BBC journalist Nick Robinson that Gordon Brown would be a "fucking disaster" as prime minister.

He was moved into the role of Secretary of State for Defence in the cabinet reshuffle on 3 October 2008. On 5 June 2009, Hutton resigned his Cabinet position and announced his intention to stand down as an MP at the next general election.

Hutton gave evidence to the Iraq Inquiry about his role as Defence Secretary on 25 January 2010, the same day as his predecessor, Des Browne.

=== House of Lords ===
On 27 June 2010, he was created a life peer as Baron Hutton of Furness, of Aldingham in the County of Cumbria, and was introduced in the House of Lords on 1 July 2010, where he sits on the Labour benches.

== Later career ==
In June 2010, it was announced that Hutton had joined the board of US nuclear power company Hyperion Power Generation. The Advisory Committee on Business Appointments stipulated that he should not lobby his former department for 12 months.

It was also announced in June 2010, that the Conservative – Lib Dem coalition had asked him to head a commission into public sector pensions. His initial report was published in October 2010. The final report was published in March 2011. On 19 June 2011, Hutton rejected claims by trade unionists and Labour colleagues that he had been used as a 'stooge' by the government and dismissed speculation regarding his motives for accepting the coalition's invitation.

Hutton became Chairman of the Nuclear Industry Association in June 2011.

Hutton was appointed as Non-executive director of Pearson Engineering, a subsidiary of state owned Israeli weapons manufacturer Rafael, in 2022. This has drawn criticism from activists accusing him of "profiting from genocide". Pearson has declared it is controlled by the Government Companies Authority of the state of Israel, but has also denied that its equipment is currently used by the Israel Defense Forces.

In 2024, he became chair of a new organisation representing PFI investors, The Association of Infrastructure Investors in Public Private Partnerships. It was set up as many PFI contracts were coming to an end over the next few years, particularly those involving schools, hospitals, military bases and housing developments. The body aims to encourage collaboration to avoid costly legal actions.

In October 2026, the Thames Water creditor consortium, London & Valley Water, announced that Hutton had been selected as prospective chair of the Thames Water board, if the consortium rescue plan receives governmental approval.

== Personal life ==
In 1978 he married Rosemary Caroline Little in Oxford. They went on to have four children, before divorcing in 1993. In 2004 he married Heather Rogers.

== Publications ==
In 2008 John Hutton's first book was published, a non-fiction book with the title Kitchener's Men: The King's Own Royal Lancasters on the Western Front 1915–18. In it, Hutton gives a "graphic insight into the daily routine and grim reality of warfare on the Western Front for men who were mostly recruited from the Furness area of the North-West". This was followed with another First World War history related title in 2010, August 1914: Surrender at St. Quentin. Further to these he has also edited Doctor on the Western Front: The Diary of Henry Owens 1914-1918 published in 2013, and authored The Gunners of August 1914: Baptism of Fire in 2014.

He has also co-authored the book How To Be A Minister: A 21st-century Guide with Sir Leigh Lewis, his permanent secretary at the Department for Work and Pensions. It was published by Biteback Publishing in September 2014.

== Bibliography ==
- Kitchener's Men: The King's Own Royal Lancasters on the Western Front 1915-1918, Pen and Sword Books Ltd, 2008, ISBN 978-1-844-15721-1
- August 1914: Surrender at St. Quentin, Pen and Sword Books Ltd, 2010, ISBN 978-1-848-84134-5
- Doctor on the Western Front: The Diary of Henry Owens 1914-1918, Pen and Sword Books Ltd, 2013, ISBN 978-1-781-59306-6 (Editor)
- The Gunners of August 1914: Baptism of Fire, Pen and Sword Books Ltd, 2014, ISBN 978-1-473-82372-3
- How to be a Minister: A 21st-Century Guide, Biteback Publishing, 2014, ISBN 978-1-849-54732-1 (Co-author with Leigh Lewis)

Parliament of the United Kingdom
Preceded by Cecil Franks	Member of Parliament for Barrow and Furness; 1992–2010	Succeeded by John Woodcock
Political offices
Preceded by Alan Milburn	Minister for the Cabinet Office; 2005	Succeeded by Jim Murphy; Acting
Preceded by Alan Milburn	Chancellor of the Duchy of Lancaster; 2005	Succeeded by Jim Murphy; Acting
Preceded by David Blunkett	Secretary of State for Work and Pensions; 2005–2007	Succeeded by Peter Hain
Preceded by Alistair Darling as Secretary of State for Trade and Industry	Secretary of State for Business, Enterprise and Regulatory Reform; 2007–2008	Succeeded by Peter Mandelson
Preceded by Des Browne	Secretary of State for Defence; 2008–2009	Succeeded by Bob Ainsworth
Orders of precedence in the United Kingdom
Preceded by The Lord German	Gentlemen; Baron Hutton of Furness	Followed by The Lord Boateng
