= James Duncan (MP for Barrow-in-Furness) =

James Archibald Duncan (1858–1911) was a British lawyer and a Liberal politician who briefly represented the seat of Barrow-in-Furness.

Duncan was born in Valparaíso, the son of the shipper David Duncan and his wife Catherine Williamson. The family moved to Gayton Hall, Wirral, Cheshire and Duncan was educated at Amersham Hall and Trinity College, Cambridge. He was called to the bar in 1883 and became a barrister of the Inner Temple. In 1890 he was elected as Member of Parliament for Barrow-in-Furness which had been briefly his father's seat. However he lost the seat two years later in 1892.

Duncan was unmarried. His nephew Sir James Duncan was also an MP and became a baronet.

Parliament of the United Kingdom
Preceded by William Sproston Caine	Member of Parliament for Barrow-in-Furness; 1890 – 1892	Succeeded by Charles Cayzer
