= Sir Charles Cayzer, 1st Baronet =

British politician

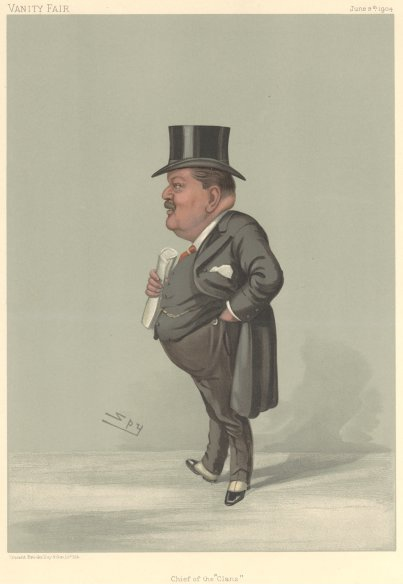
"Chief of the 'Clans'" Cayzer as caricatured by Spy (Leslie Ward) in Vanity Fair, June 1904

Sir Charles William Cayzer, 1st Baronet (15 July 1843 – 28 September 1916) was a British businessman and Conservative Party politician.

== Biography ==
Born in Limehouse, a maritime district of the East End of London, Cayzer was the son of Charles Cayzer, a schoolmaster, and his wife Mary Elizabeth Nicklin. At the age of fifteen, Cayzer took a position as clerk on a commercial shipping route to Japan. In 1861 he took up employment as a shipping agent in Bombay and by 1868 was working for the British-India Steam Navigation Company as master of stores.

He left India in 1873, to work for the British-India Line's London agents. In 1876, he approached British-India's owner William McKinnon, seeking to form a business partnership.

McKinnon refused, and Cayzer founded his own shipping business C.W. Cayzer & Company in Liverpool in 1877. The company traded between India and the United Kingdom, and in the following year he formed a partnership with Captain William Irvine and the firm became Cayzer, Irvine & Company. Later in the same year the Glasgow shipbuilder Alexander Stephen took a stake in the business which moved headquarters to Glasgow and was relaunched as the Clan Line. In 1880, the wealthy industrialist Thomas Coats became involved and the enlarged Clan Line Association of Steamers was formed.

Cayzer amassed a large fortune from his shipping interests, and purchased a number of estates in Scotland, totalling approximately 12,000 acres in area. These included Gartmore near Aberfoyle in Perthshire, Ralston near Paisley, Renfrewshire and Newtyle in Forfarshire. He was also known for his philanthropy, including donating Ralston House to the Red Cross for use as a home for paralysed servicemen.

He was a Freemason and an Officer of the United Grand Lodge of England and went on to found Wilbraham Masonic Lodge No. 1713, in the Province of West Lancashire in 1877. The Lodge went from strength to strength as did all of Freemasonry in England. Wilbraham Lodge's last meeting was in May 2008 and was formally erased due to falling numbers in December 2008. In 1890, he purchased Clevedon House, Cove as a summer home. He was elected provost of the burgh of Cove and Kilcreggan in 1891.

On 23 March 1898, he was appointed Honorary Colonel of the Glasgow-based 1st Lanarkshire Artillery Volunteers, and retained the position with its successor the 3rd Lowland Brigade, Royal Field Artillery in the Territorial Force.

He was elected at the 1892 general election as the Member of Parliament (MP) for Barrow in Furness, and held the seat until his defeat at the 1906 general election. He contested the January 1910 general election in the Monmouth Boroughs, but did not win the seat.

== Personal life ==
He was knighted in 1897, and made a baronet in 1904, of Gartmore, Perthshire.

Cayzer married Agnes Elizabeth Trickey (1850–1919) of Clifton, Bristol, in 1868. The couple met in Bombay when she was travelling on her father's ship and had six sons and three daughters. His third son, August or "Gus" was to succeed him as chairman of Clan Line and was created a baronet in 1921, while his fifth son, Herbert or "Bertie" was also chairman of Clan Line and a Conservative member of parliament. He was created a baronet in 1924 and was raised to the peerage as Baron Rotherwick in 1939. Two of his daughters married men who became Admiral of the Fleet in the Royal Navy: Florence, his second daughter married John Jellicoe in 1902, while his third daughter, Constance married Charles Madden in 1905.

Cayzer died at Gartmore in September 1916 following a short illness. He was succeeded in the baronetcy by his eldest son, Charles William Cayzer born in 1869.

He is the three times great grandfather of Labour and Co-operative politician Stella Creasy on her maternal side.

Parliament of the United Kingdom
Preceded by James Duncan	Member of Parliament for Barrow-in-Furness; 1892 – 1906	Succeeded by Charles Duncan
Peerage of the United Kingdom
New title	Baronet (of Gartmore, Perthshire); 1904–1916	Succeeded by Charles William Cayzer
