= Walter Monslow, Baron Monslow =

British politician (1895-1966)

Walter Monslow Baron Monslow

Member of Parliament for Barrow-in-Furness
- In office 1945–1966
- Preceded by: Sir Jonah Walker-Smith
- Succeeded by: Albert Booth

Personal details
- Born: 26 January 1895 Wrexham, Wales
- Died: 12 October 1966 (aged 71)
- Party: Labour

Walter Monslow, Baron Monslow (26 January 1895 – 12 October 1966) was a Labour Party politician in the United Kingdom.

Born in Wrexham, Monslow joined the Associated Society of Locomotive Engineers and Firemen, becoming its organising secretary. He also joined the Labour Party, serving on Wrexham Rural District Council for some years until 1937.

At the 1935 general election, Monslow unsuccessfully contested Newcastle upon Tyne Central. He was elected at 1945 general election as member of parliament (MP) for Barrow-in-Furness, and held the seat until he retired from the House of Commons at the general election in March 1966.

On 15 June 1966, he was made a life peer as Baron Monslow, of Barrow-in-Furness in the County Palatine of Lancaster. He died in October that year, aged 71.

Parliament of the United Kingdom
Preceded by Sir Jonah Walker-Smith	Member of Parliament for Barrow-in-Furness; 1945–1966	Succeeded by Albert Booth
