= Irton Pike =

Coordinates: 54°24′06″N 3°21′23″W

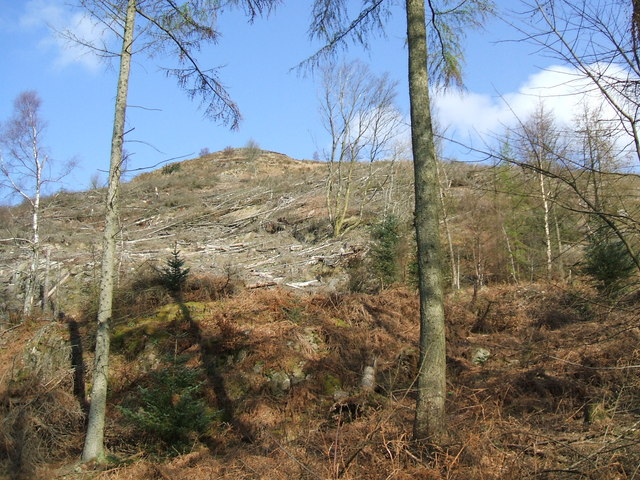
Irton Pike

Irton Pike is a hill in the west of the English Lake District, near Santon Bridge, Cumbria. It is the subject of a chapter of Alfred Wainwright's book The Outlying Fells of Lakeland. The hill reaches a height of 751 feet (229 m). Wainwright's walk as described in Lakeland is an anticlockwise circuit from Irton Road station on the Ravenglass and Eskdale Railway, near Eskdale Green. He describes "this tiny top" as "a near-perfect solace for reminiscences of past happy days on the higher fells", adding "Climb Irton Pike while ye may!"
