= Albert Booth =

British politician

The Right Honourable Albert Booth

Shadow Secretary of State for Transport
- In office 14 July 1979 – 9 June 1983
- Leader: James Callaghan; Michael Foot
- Preceded by: Norman Fowler
- Succeeded by: John Prescott

Shadow Secretary of State for Employment
- In office 4 May 1979 – 14 July 1979
- Leader: James Callaghan
- Preceded by: James Prior
- Succeeded by: Eric Varley

Secretary of State for Employment
- In office 8 April 1976 – 4 May 1979
- Prime Minister: James Callaghan
- Preceded by: Michael Foot
- Succeeded by: James Prior

Minister of State for Employment
- In office 5 March 1974 – 8 April 1976
- Prime Minister: Harold Wilson
- Preceded by: Robin Chichester-Clark
- Succeeded by: Harold Walker

Member of Parliament for Barrow-in-Furness
- In office 31 March 1966 – 13 May 1983
- Preceded by: Walter Monslow
- Succeeded by: Cecil Franks

Personal details
- Born: 28 May 1928 Acomb, England
- Died: 6 February 2010 (aged 81) London, England
- Party: Labour
- Education: Northumbria University

Albert Edward Booth (28 May 1928 – 6 February 2010) was a British left-wing Labour Party politician and cabinet minister.

== Early life ==
Booth was born in Acomb, in the North Riding of Yorkshire, in 1928. He was raised in Hampshire and South Shields, and educated at Marine School, South Shields, and Rutherford College of Technology (now Northumbria University). He was a design draughtsman. He served as a councillor on Tynemouth Council 1962–65.

== Parliamentary career ==
Booth unsuccessfully contested Tynemouth in 1964, losing to the sitting MP Irene Ward. He was Member of Parliament for Barrow-in-Furness from 1966 to 1983, and was Secretary of State for Employment from 1976 to 1979 serving under James Callaghan. He also acted as the Labour Party's national Treasurer between 1983 and 1984.

After boundary changes, his seat was renamed Barrow and Furness, for the 1983 General Election but despite a 1979 majority of 7,741 he lost it to the Conservative Cecil Franks. This has often been attributed to Labour's unilateralist policy of nuclear disarmament, and Booth himself identified with that, leading a CND march through his constituency. However, his constituents were reliant on the defence industries, particularly shipbuilding, and this led to one of Labour's most unexpected defeats of the election. However, a campaign against him centred in a local Catholic church, highlighting his record of voting in favour of women's right to choose to have an abortion, was also a significant factor. (Booth was a lay preacher in the Methodist Church.)

== Later career ==
Booth made it through to the final round in the Labour selection for Sunderland South ahead of the 1987 election, but lost out by four votes to Chris Mullin. He unsuccessfully contested Warrington South in 1987.

== Personal life and death ==
In 1957, Booth married Joan Atkinson (née Amis); they had three sons and were married until her death in 2008.

Booth died at the Princess Royal University Hospital in Locksbottom, London, on 6 February 2010, at the age of 81; his health had been in decline due to a series of illnesses, including prostate cancer.

Parliament of the United Kingdom
Preceded by Walter Monslow	Member of Parliament for Barrow-in-Furness; 1966–1983	Succeeded by Cecil Franks
Political offices
Preceded by Michael Foot	Secretary of State for Employment; 1976–1979	Succeeded by James Prior
Party political offices
Preceded by Eric Varley	Treasurer of the Labour Party; 1983–1984	Succeeded by Sam McCluskie
