= Michelle Scrogham =

British Labour politician (born 1970)

Michelle Scrogham MP
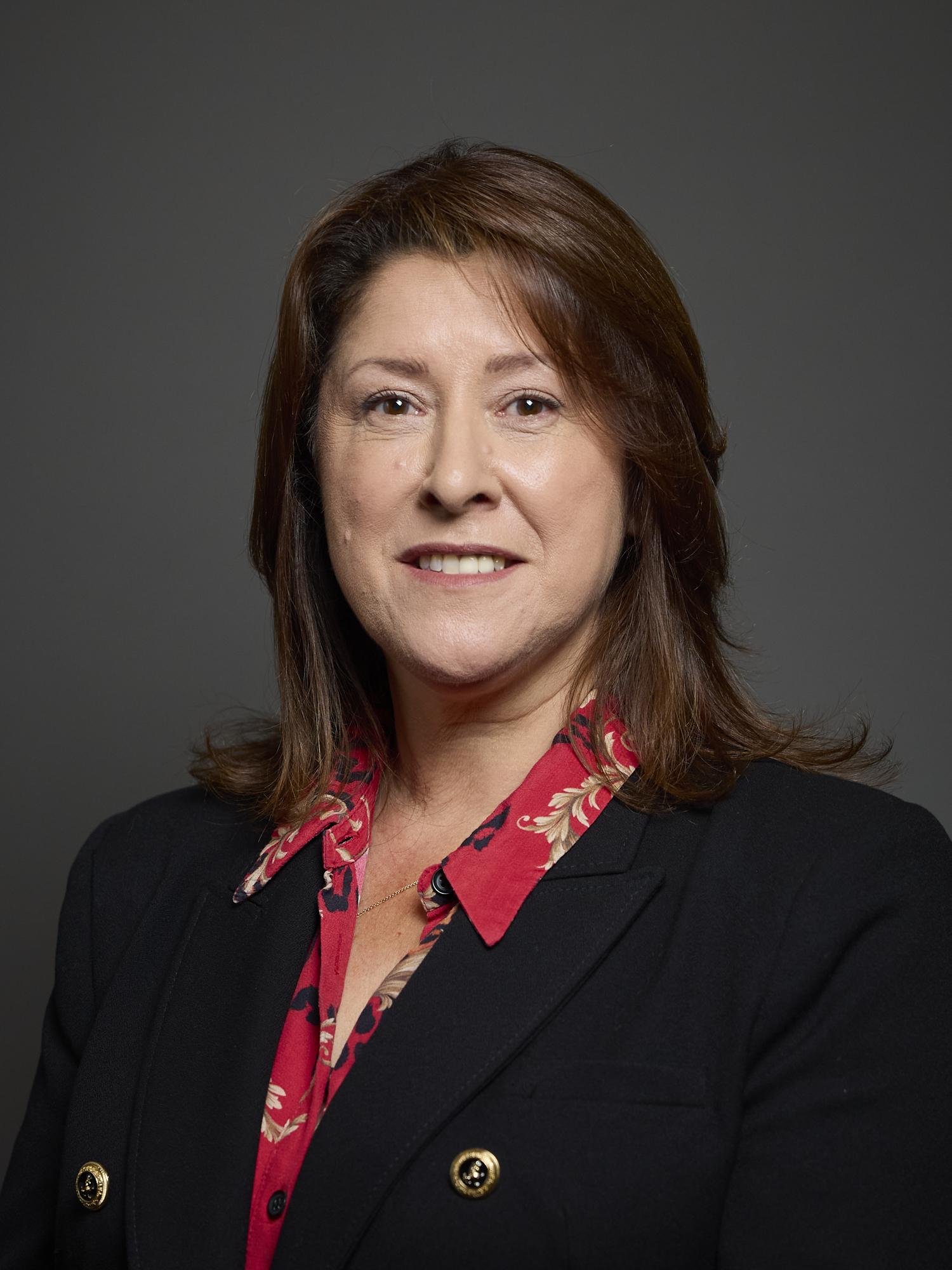
- Official portrait, 2024

Member of Parliament for Barrow and Furness
- Incumbent
- Assumed office 4 July 2024
- Preceded by: Simon Fell
- Majority: 5,324 (12.6%)

Personal details
- Born: Michelle White; December 1970 (age 55) Ulverston, Lancashire, England
- Party: Labour
- Spouse: Graham Scrogham (m. 1991)
- Website: michellescrogham.com

Michelle Scrogham (née White; born December 1970) is a British Labour Party politician and businesswoman who has been Member of Parliament (MP) for Barrow and Furness since 2024. She was first elected in the 2024 general election when she defeated the incumbent MP, Simon Fell of the Conservative Party.

Scrogham was born and still lives in the town of Ulverston, within her constituency, and has previously held posts both as town councillor and mayor for Ulverston (2022–2024), as well as heading the Ulverston Business Improvement District. She is the co-owner of a clothing and fashion boutique, Pure, in Ulverston town centre, that she founded in 2005 with her sister. She has been married to Graham Scrogham, who succeeded her as mayor of Ulverston, since 1991.

Parliament of the United Kingdom
Preceded by Simon Fell	Member of Parliament for Barrow and Furness; 2024–present	Incumbent
