= Giggle Alley =

Woodland in Eskdale Green, England

Coordinates: 54°23′26″N 3°19′30″W

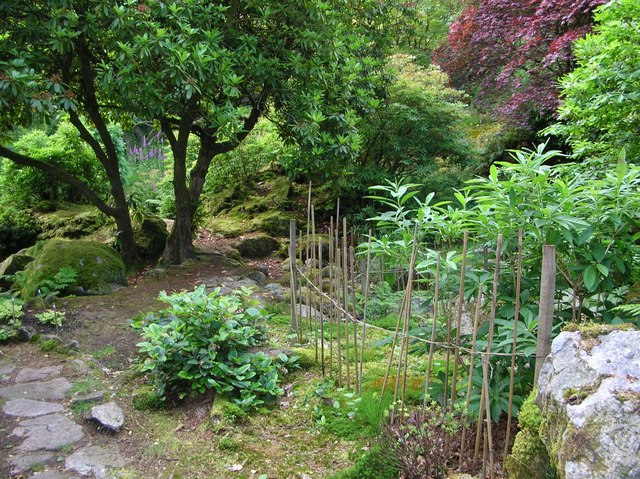

Giggle Alley is a woodland in Eskdale Green, Cumbria, England. It was formerly part of the Gate House estate. The wood includes the ruins of a Japanese garden, created in 1914 as part of the estate. It was laid out by the team of Thomas Hayton Mawson.

The area was sold to the Outward Bound Trust in 1949 when they bought the house and part of the grounds. The woodland was then sold by Outward Bound to the Forestry Commission in the 1960s; Outward Bound retain ownership of the house. Restoration efforts began in the 2000s.
