= The Green railway station =

Station on the Ravenglass & Eskdale Railway, Cumbria, England

The Green Eskdale Green King of Prussia
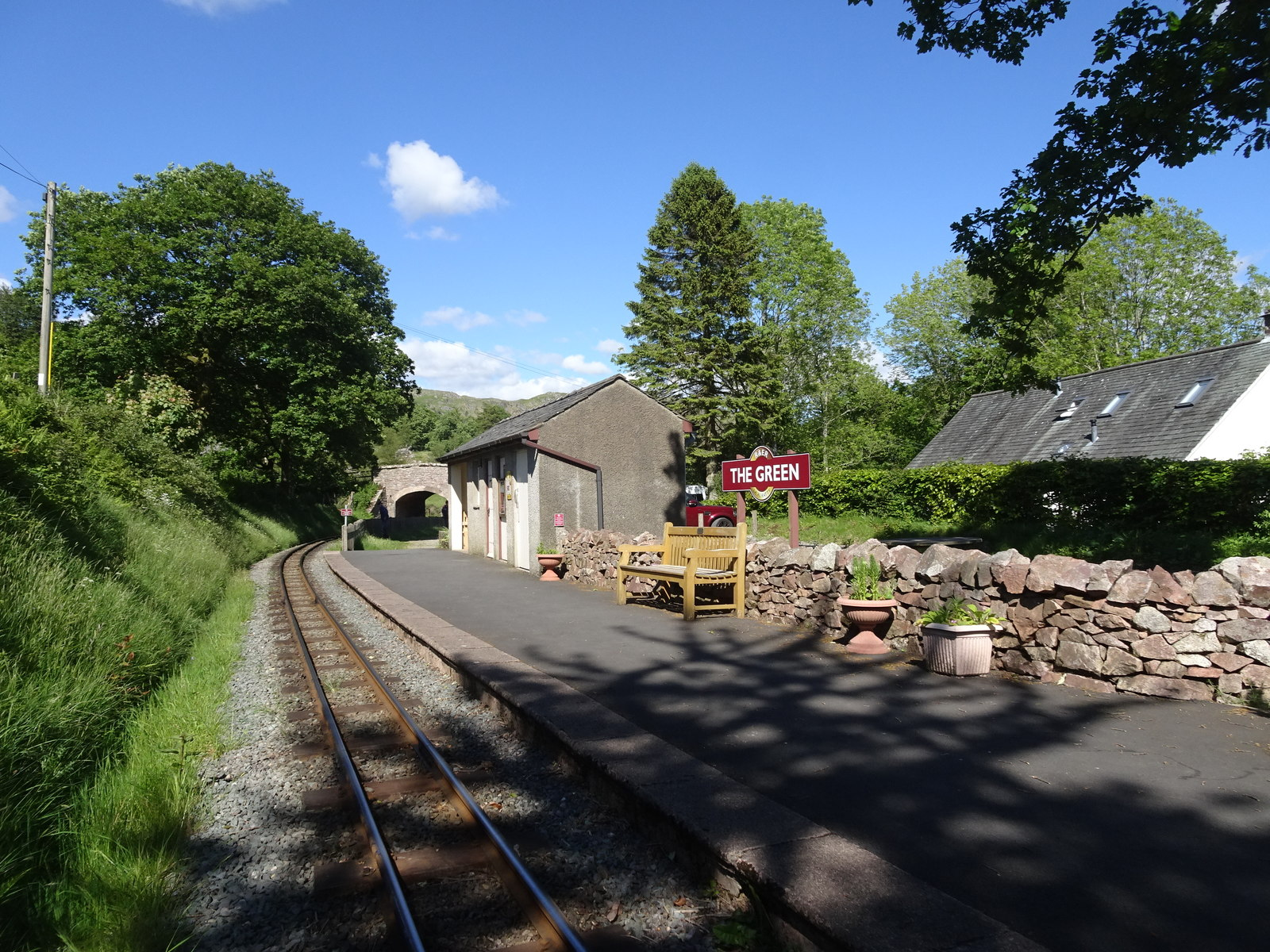

General information
- Location: Eskdale Green, Cumberland; England
- Coordinates: 54.387°N 3.318°W
- Grid reference: SD 145999
- System: Station on heritage railway
- Owner: R&ER
- Operator: R&ER
- Manager: R&ER

Key dates
- 1876: Opened (3 ft gauge)
- 1913: Station closed
- 1916: Reopened (15 in gauge)
- 1967: New station buildings and raised platform completed
Location

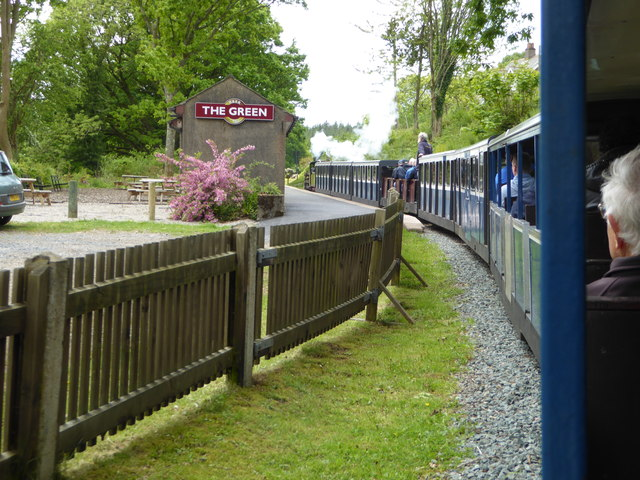
The Green railway station

The Green is a railway station on the 15-inch gauge Ravenglass & Eskdale Railway in the Lake District National Park and the English county of Cumbria. The station is situated on the southern edge of the village of Eskdale Green, overlooking the Eskdale valley and Muncaster Fell. It was originally known as King of Prussia after the nearby public house, and later as Eskdale Green. The Eskdale Green name has continued in popular use, and was still in official use in 2017 (as it was in previous years) in the railway's "full" timetable of intermediate stopping places.

The station is linked by various public footpaths and bridleways to the railway stations at Irton Road, Dalegarth and Ravenglass, to the village of Eskdale Green, and to Muncaster Fell. The King George IV pub and Giggle Alley Japanese Gardens are within easy walking distance along a public road.

== History ==
Originally the site of a siding used for local goods traffic, the first station was built in 1876, consisting of a short platform and small waiting shelter located next to the road bridge. The station building survived in the 15-inch gauge era, but was removed during the 1930s. In the early 1960s, the siding was removed and in 1965 construction of a new station building and platform commenced. The work was carried out by the Ravenglass and Eskdale Railway Preservation Society West Yorkshire Group, and was completed by 1968. The station remains largely in its 1968 condition, although a toilet was added around 1990, in order to improve facilities for volunteer staff and passengers.

== Operations ==
The station is located about 5 miles (8.0 km) from Ravenglass and just over 2 miles (3.2 km) from Dalegarth. Trains generally take 25 minutes to reach Ravenglass, and 15 minutes to reach Dalegarth. In high season, trains pass at 40-minute intervals in each direction.

The station is staffed during the summer months, when volunteers are available. There is a booking office inside the shelter building. There is no passing loop, and only simple one-train operations are possible. The station has an internal telephone link to other stations, and the railway control centre, and is connected to mains electricity. Buildings in use include a waiting shelter, booking office, and toilet. There is a very limited amount of car parking available. No real-time running information is provided.

== Future Developments ==
The preservation society is considering a project to redevelop the current station building, providing better facilities for the station master and for passengers. The proposal would incorporate a partially under cover picnic area. Funding for the proposed development would be taken from a large legacy left to the preservation society by one of its former members.

== Accessibility ==
Wheelchair users are able to join trains here, but prior notice must be given to the railway before the day of travel. Wheelchair users may alight at this station, if they have informed the guard in advance.

== Gallery ==
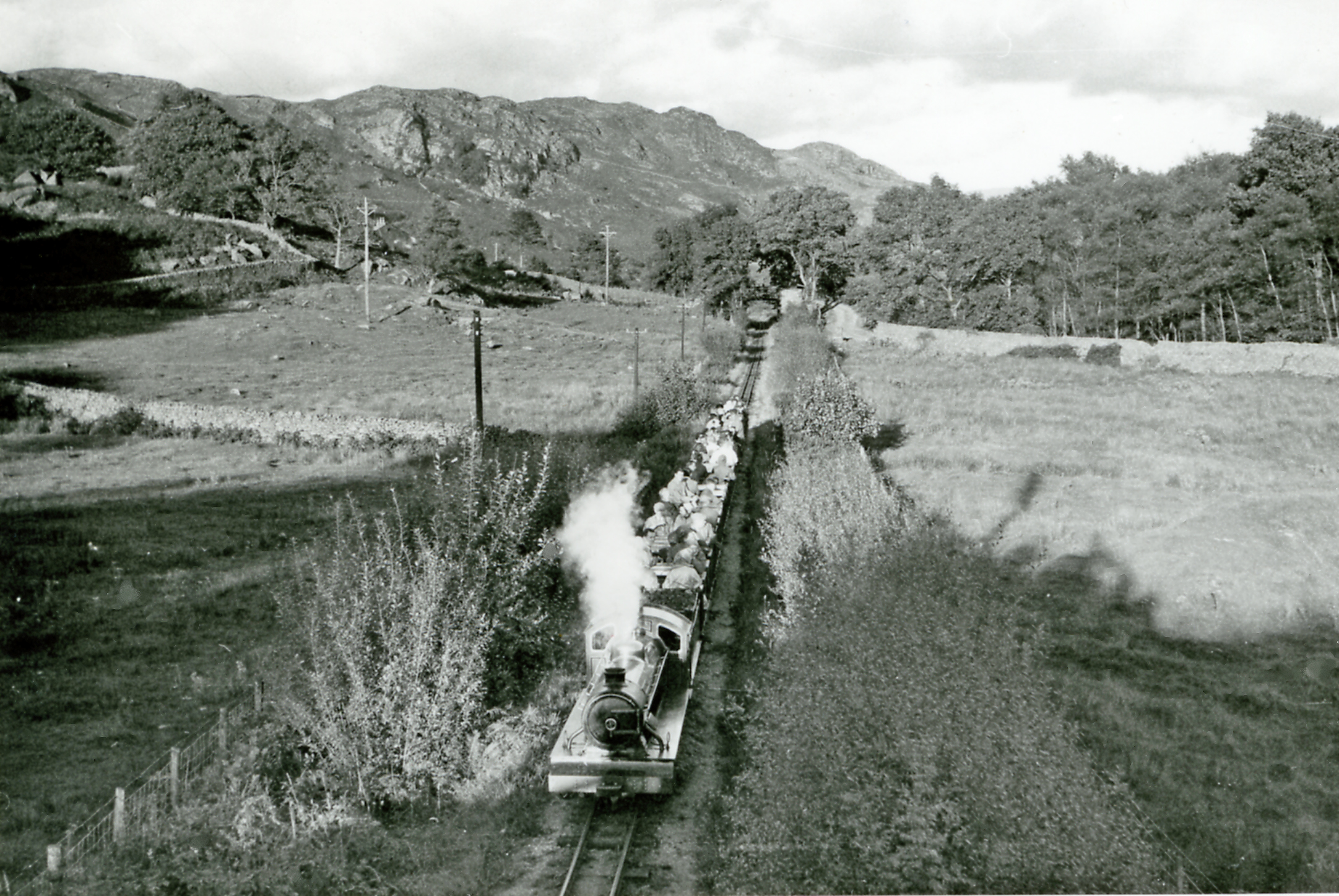
River Irt approaching Eskdale Green from Dalegarth in 1961.

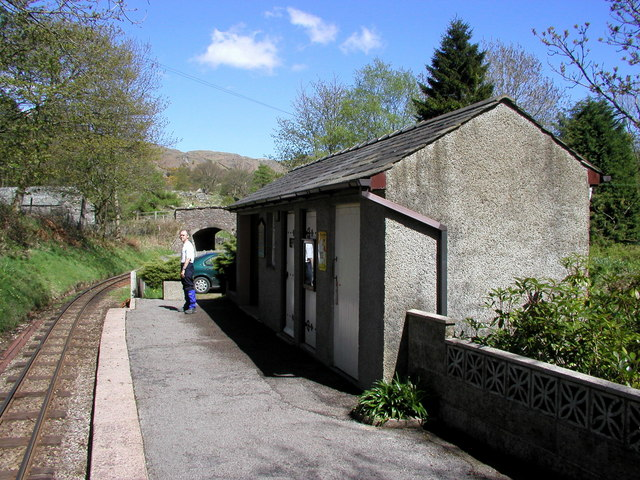
The station looking east towards Dalegarth

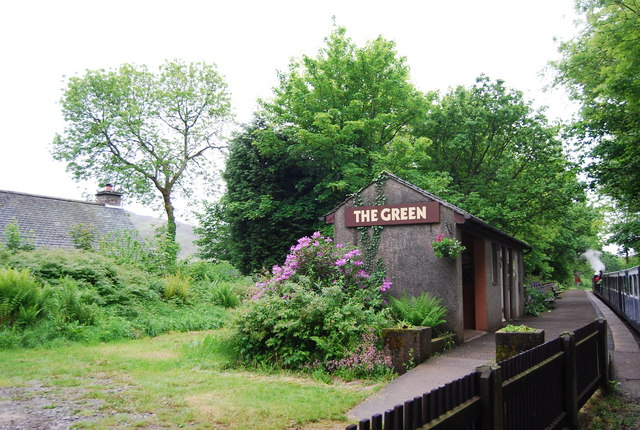
The station looking west towards Ravenglass

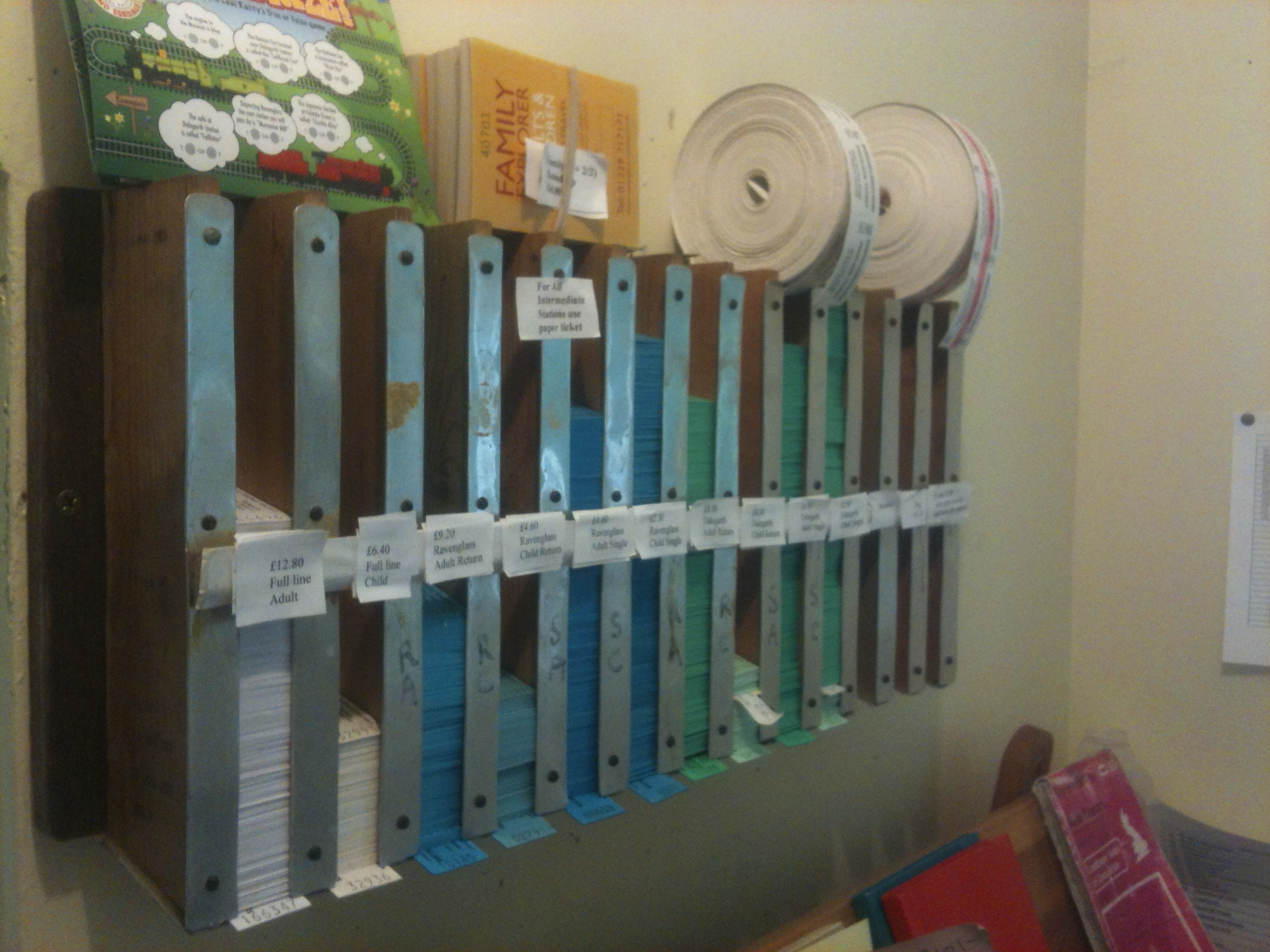
The Edmondson ticket rack in the Station Master's office.

Preceding station	Heritage railways	Following station
Irton Road towards Ravenglass	Ravenglass & Eskdale Railway	Fisherground towards Dalegarth
