= Gate House, Eskdale Green =

Country house in Eskdale, Cumbria, England

Coordinates: 54.3903°N 3.3204°W

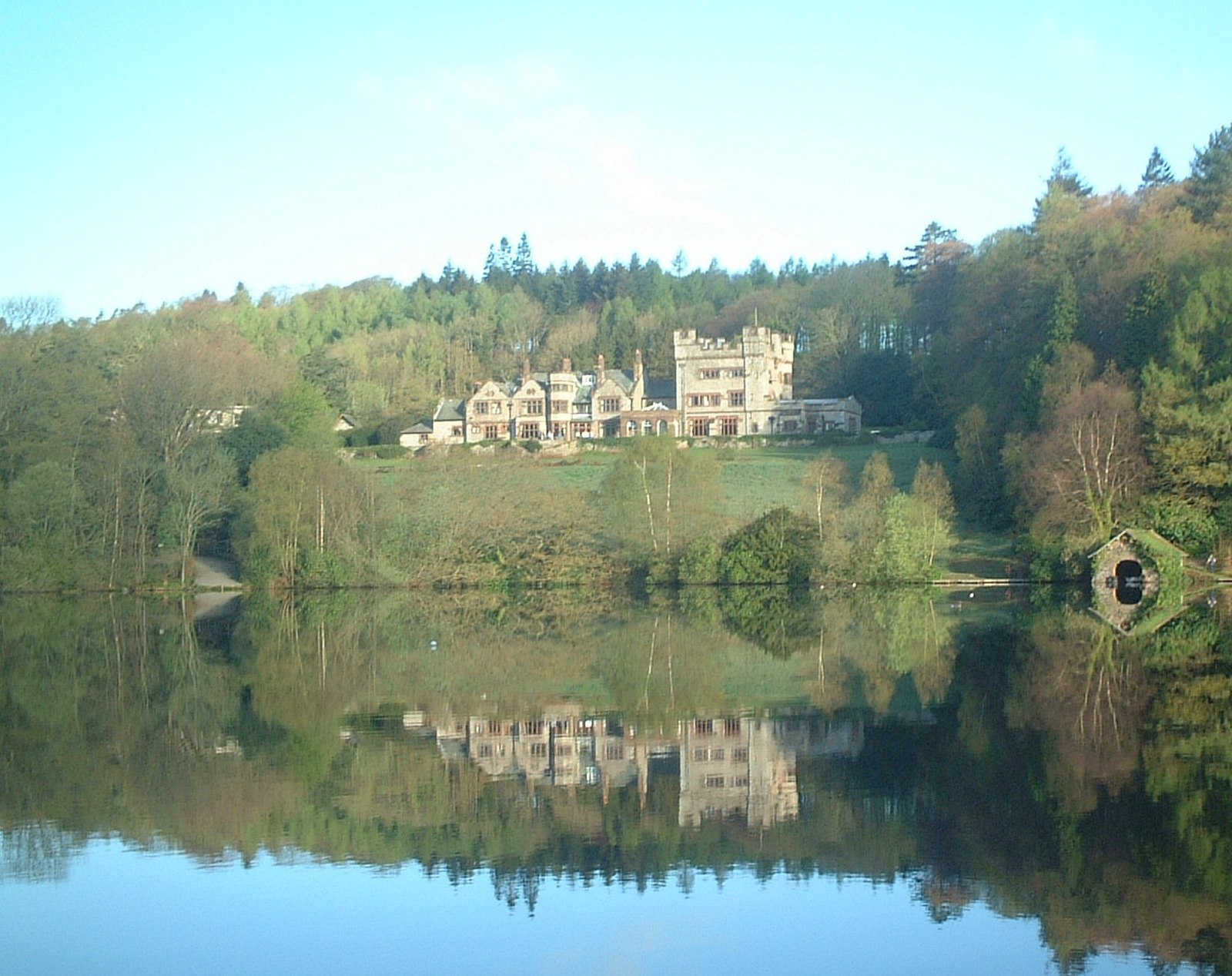

Gate House or Gatehouse is a country house in Eskdale Green, Cumbria, England. The house became a Grade II listed building on 8 September 1967.

Built in 1896 for the Rea family, the house and part of the grounds were sold via auction in 1949 to the Outward Bound Trust, who converted it in 1950 into their Eskdale Centre. The rest of the estate was sold at the same time in 13 other lots.

The grounds were designed by Thomas H. Mawson and included Giggle Alley Forest, site of a Japanese garden which, created in 1914 but derelict by the time of the 1949 auction. The forest was sold to the Forestry Commission by the Outward Bound Trust in the 1960s.
