= Barrow and Furness =

Parliamentary constituency in the United Kingdom, 1885 onwards

Coordinates: 54.112°N 3.178°W

- County constituency for the House of Commons
- Interactive map of boundaries since 2024
- Location within North West England
- County: Cumbria (Lancashire until 1974)
- Population: 88,826 (2011 census)
- Electorate: 76,603 (March 2020)
- Major settlements: Barrow-in-Furness, Ulverston, Dalton-in-Furness, Millom

Current constituency
- Created: 1885
- Member of Parliament: Michelle Scrogham (Labour)
- Seats: One
- Created from: North Lancashire

Barrow and Furness, formerly known as Barrow-in-Furness, is a UK Parliament constituency (Note: A county constituency (for the purposes of election expenses and type of returning officer)) in Cumbria. It has been represented in the House of Commons of the UK Parliament by Michelle Scrogham of the Labour Party since 2024. (Note: As with all constituencies, the constituency elects one Member of Parliament (MP) by the first past the post system of election at least every five years.)

Since its inception in 1885, the constituency has been centred on the town of Barrow-in-Furness, at the tip of the Furness peninsula. Over the intervening years the constituency has periodically grown in size and, as of the 2024 general election, it incorporates the entirety of the peninsula, the Eskdale and Duddon Valleys, and the western cost of Cumbria as far north as Ravenglass.

== Constituency profile ==
The constituency is located in Cumbria and covers parts of the unitary authority areas of Cumberland and Westmorland and Furness. The constituency contains the large port town of Barrow-in-Furness and extensive rural areas to its north, some of which lie within the Lake District National Park. Other settlements in the constituency include the smaller towns of Ulverston, Millom, Dalton-in-Furness and Broughton-in-Furness.

Barrow-in-Furness is an industrial town with a history of steelmaking and shipbuilding. It once contained the largest steelworks in the world, and the BAE Systems shipyard—which manufactures nuclear submarines for the Royal Navy—is the town's largest employer. Residents of the constituency have, on average, slightly lower levels of wealth and education compared to the rest of the country, and white people make up 97% of the population. At the most recent local elections in 2022, voters in Barrow-in-Furness elected mostly Labour Party councillors, whilst the seats in the rural areas of the constituency elected Conservatives. An estimated 59% of voters in the constituency supported leaving the European Union in the 2016 referendum, higher than the national average.

== Election history ==
The seat was established by the Redistribution of Seats Act 1885 and covers the southwest part of Cumbria. It was predominantly a Conservative seat in its early history, though from 1945, it became an increasingly safe seat for Labour for nearly four decades. The largest town in the constituency, Barrow-in-Furness, grew on the back of the shipbuilding industry and is now the site of the BAE Systems nuclear submarine and shipbuilding operation. This reliance on the industry aligns many of its journalists and in its community with strong nuclear deterrents, from which Labour has recoiled since its involvement in the Iraq War that removed dictator Saddam Hussain. Labour Cabinet member Albert Booth represented Barrow for many years from 1966, but was defeated in 1983, in the aftermath of the Falklands War, by a Manchester lawyer, Cecil Franks of the Conservative Party, who retained the seat until 1992. Local media attributed this to widespread fears of job losses because the Labour Party was then signed up to doing away with all its nuclear capabilities including the submarines. (Note: See Labour Party and Campaign for Nuclear Disarmament) Other industries in the constituency currently include engineering and chemicals, and more than a quarter of all jobs are in manufacturing.

As Labour revised its policies by favouring the retention of Britain's nuclear capability, and following massive job losses in the town's shipbuilding industry, Labour's fortunes revived in Barrow. John Hutton took the seat back for Labour in 1992 and retained it until the 2010 general election, when he was replaced by John Woodcock, also of Labour. In 2001, Hutton had the support of more than half of all those who voted. The 2015 result gave the seat the 10th-smallest majority of Labour's 232 seats by percentage of majority. In 2017, Woodcock's majority was reduced from 795 votes to 209 votes, the 16th smallest majority in the country.

Following Woodcock's resignation from the Labour party in 2018, he stood down as an MP for the 2019 general election when the seat was gained by Conservative Simon Fell, who had contested the seat unsuccessfully in 2015 and 2017. He won with a slightly greater margin than Woodcock had when he first won the seat for Labour in 2010. The seat was retaken by Labour's Michelle Scrogham at the 2024 election with a majority of 12.6% - the same as Fell's majority in 2019.

== Boundaries ==
Map of boundaries 2010-2024

Barrow-in-Furness in Lancashire, boundaries used 1974-83

=== Historic ===
1885–1918: The Municipal Borough of Barrow-in-Furness.

1918–1950: The County Borough of Barrow-in-Furness.

1950–1983: The County Borough of Barrow-in-Furness and the Urban District of Dalton-in-Furness.

1983–2010: The entire District of Barrow-in-Furness and the following wards from the District of South Lakeland: Low Furness, Pennington, Ulverston Central, Ulverston East, Ulverston North, Ulverston South and Ulverston West.

2010–2024: The entire District of Barrow-in-Furness and the following wards from the District of South Lakeland: Broughton, Crake Valley, Low Furness & Swarthmoor, Ulverston Central, Ulverston East, Ulverston North, Ulverston South, Ulverston Town and Ulverston West.

=== Current ===
The 2023 review of Westminster constituencies was carried out using the local authority structure as it existed in Cumbria on 1 December 2020 and is officially defined as:

- The Borough of Barrow-in-Furness.
- The Borough of Copeland wards of: Black Combe & Scafell; Millom.
- The District of South Lakeland wards of: Broughton & Coniston (polling districts AHA, AHB, AHC, BZ, CA, CB, CL and CY); Furness Peninsula; Ulverston East; Ulverston West.

With effect from 1 April 2023, the second tier councils in Cumbria were abolished and replaced by the new unitary authorities of Cumberland, and Westmorland and Furness. Consequently, the constituency now comprises the following from the 2024 general election:

- The Cumberland wards of: Millom; Millom Without (most).
- The Westmorland and Furness wards of: Dalton North; Dalton South; Hawcoat and Newbarns; High Furness; Low Furness; Old Barrow and Hindpool; Ormsgill and Parkside; Risedale and Roosecote; Ulverston; Walney Island; and a very small part of Coniston and Hawkshead.

The constituency was expanded to bring the electorate within the permitted range by transferring the town of Millom from the abolished constituency of Copeland.

== Members of Parliament ==
Election	Member	Party
1885	David Duncan	Liberal
1886 by-election	William Sproston Caine	Liberal
1886	William Sproston Caine	Liberal Unionist
1890 by-election	James Duncan	Liberal
1892	Charles Cayzer	Conservative
1906	Charles Duncan	Labour
1918	Robert Chadwick	Conservative
1922	Daniel Somerville	Conservative
1924	John Bromley	Labour
1931	Jonah Walker-Smith	Conservative
1945	Walter Monslow	Labour
1966	Albert Booth	Labour
1983	Constituency renamed "Barrow and Furness"	
1983	Cecil Franks	Conservative
1992	John Hutton	Labour
2010	John Woodcock	Labour Co-op
2018	John Woodcock	Independent
2019	Simon Fell	Conservative
2024	Michelle Scrogham	Labour

== Election results ==
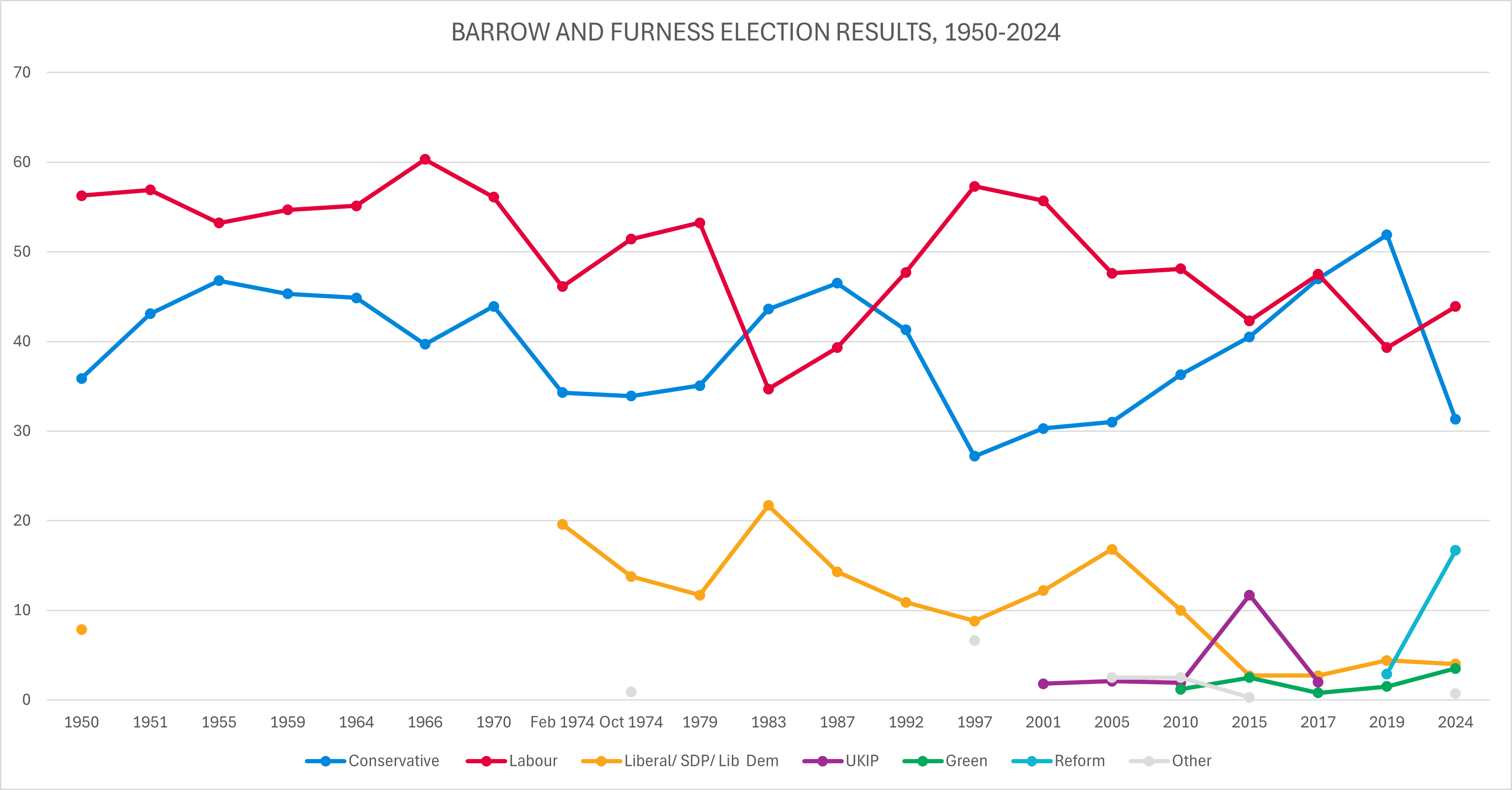
Election results 1950-2024

=== Elections in the 21st century ===
==== Elections in the 2020s ====
General election 2024: Barrow and Furness
Party	Candidate	Votes	%	±%
Labour	Michelle Scrogham	18,537	43.9	▲5.7
Conservative	Simon Fell	13,213	31.3	▼21.8
Reform	Barry Morgan	7,035	16.7	▲14.0
Liberal Democrats	Adrian Waite	1,680	4.0	▼0.5
Green	Lorraine Wrennall	1,466	3.5	▲2.0
Party of Women	Lisa Morgan	290	0.7	new
Majority		5,324	12.6	
Turnout		42,221	56.3	▼8.3
Labour gain from Conservative		Swing	▲13.7	

==== Elections in the 2010s ====
2019 notional result
Party	Vote	%
Conservative	26,551	53.1
Labour	19,115	38.2
Liberal Democrats	2,256	4.5
Brexit Party	1,355	2.7
Green Party of England and Wales	770	1.5
Majority	7,436	14.9
Turnout	50,047	65.3
Electorate	76,603	

General election 2019: Barrow and Furness
Party	Candidate	Votes	%	±%
Conservative	Simon Fell	23,876	51.9	▲4.9
Labour	Chris Altree	18,087	39.3	▼8.2
Liberal Democrats	Loraine Birchall	2,025	4.4	▲1.7
Brexit Party	Ged McGrath	1,355	2.9	New
Green	Chris Loynes	703	1.5	▲0.7
Majority		5,789	12.6	N/A
Turnout		46,046	65.8	▼2.7
Conservative gain from Labour		Swing	▲6.5	

General election 2017: Barrow and Furness
Party	Candidate	Votes	%	±%
Labour Co-op	John Woodcock	22,592	47.5	▲5.2
Conservative	Simon Fell	22,383	47.0	▲6.5
Liberal Democrats	Loraine Birchall	1,278	2.7	0.0
UKIP	Alan Piper	962	2.0	▼9.7
Green	Rob O'Hara	375	0.8	▼1.7
Majority		209	0.5	▼1.3
Turnout		47,590	68.5	▲5.2
Labour hold		Swing	▼0.7	

General election 2015: Barrow and Furness
Party	Candidate	Votes	%	±%
Labour Co-op	John Woodcock	18,320	42.3	▼5.8
Conservative	Simon Fell	17,525	40.5	▲4.2
UKIP	Nigel Cecil	5,070	11.7	▲9.8
Liberal Democrats	Clive Peaple	1,169	2.7	▼7.3
Green	Rob O'Hara	1,061	2.5	▲1.3
Independent	Ian Jackson	130	0.3	New
Majority		795	1.8	▼10.0
Turnout		43,275	63.3	▼0.4
Labour hold		Swing	▼5.0	

General election 2010: Barrow and Furness
Party	Candidate	Votes	%	±%
Labour Co-op	John Woodcock	21,226	48.1	▲2.9
Conservative	John Gough	16,018	36.3	▲3.7
Liberal Democrats	Barry Rabone	4,424	10.0	▼7.9
UKIP	John Smith	841	1.9	▼0.2
BNP	Mike Ashburner	840	1.9	New
Green	Chris Loynes	530	1.2	New
Independent	Brian Greaves	245	0.6	New
Majority		5,208	11.8	▼0.8
Turnout		44,124	63.7	▲4.8
Labour hold		Swing	▼0.4	

==== Elections in the 2000s ====
General election 2005: Barrow and Furness
Party	Candidate	Votes	%	±%
Labour	John Hutton	17,360	47.6	▼8.1
Conservative	William Dorman	11,323	31.0	▲0.7
Liberal Democrats	Barry Rabone	6,130	16.8	▲4.6
UKIP	Alan Beach	758	2.1	▲0.3
Build Duddon and Morecambe Bridges	Timothey Bell	409	1.1	New
Veritas	Brian Greaves	306	0.8	New
Independent	Helene Young	207	0.6	New
Majority		6,037	16.6	▼8.8
Turnout		36,493	59.0	▼1.3
Labour hold		Swing	▼4.4	

General election 2001: Barrow and Furness
Party	Candidate	Votes	%	±%
Labour	John Hutton	21,724	55.7	▼1.6
Conservative	James Airey	11,835	30.3	▲3.1
Liberal Democrats	Barry Rabone	4,750	12.2	▲3.4
UKIP	John Smith	711	1.8	New
Majority		9,889	25.4	▼4.7
Turnout		39,020	60.3	▼11.7
Labour hold		Swing	▼2.4	

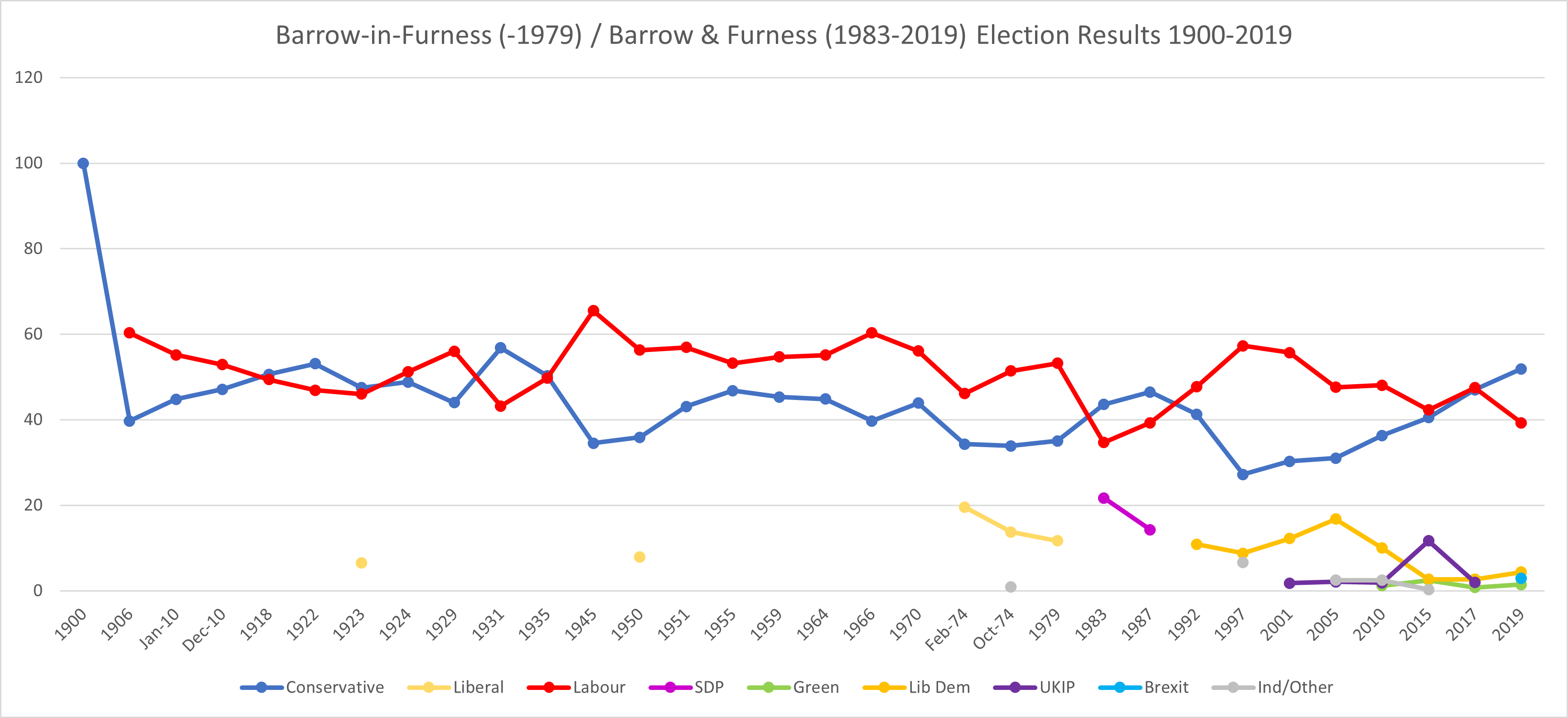

=== Elections in the 20th century ===
==== Elections in the 1990s ====
General election 1997: Barrow and Furness
Party	Candidate	Votes	%	±%
Labour	John Hutton	27,630	57.3	▲9.6
Conservative	Richard Hunt	13,133	27.2	▼14.1
Liberal Democrats	Anne A. Metcalfe	4,264	8.8	▼2.1
Independent	Jim Hamezeian	1,995	4.1	New
Referendum	David Y. Mitchell	1,208	2.5	New
Majority		14,497	30.1	▲23.7
Turnout		48,230	72.0	▼10.0
Labour hold		Swing	▲11.9	

General election 1992: Barrow and Furness
Party	Candidate	Votes	%	±%
Labour	John Hutton	26,568	47.7	▲8.4
Conservative	Cecil Franks	22,990	41.3	▼5.2
Liberal Democrats	Clive J. Crane	6,089	10.9	▼3.4
Majority		3,578	6.4	N/A
Turnout		55,647	82.0	▲3.0
Labour gain from Conservative		Swing	▲6.8	

==== Elections in the 1980s ====
General election 1987: Barrow and Furness
Party	Candidate	Votes	%	±%
Conservative	Cecil Franks	25,431	46.5	▲2.9
Labour	Peter Phizacklea	21,504	39.3	▲4.6
SDP	Richard Phelps	7,799	14.3	▼7.4
Majority		3,927	7.2	▼1.7
Turnout		54,731	79.0	▲3.8
Conservative hold		Swing	▼0.9	

General election 1983: Barrow and Furness
Party	Candidate	Votes	%	±%
Conservative	Cecil Franks	22,284	43.6	
Labour	Albert Booth	17,707	34.7	
SDP	David Cottier	11,079	21.7	New
Majority		4,577	8.9	N/A
Turnout		51,070	75.2	
Conservative gain from Labour		Swing		

==== Elections in the 1970s ====
General election 1979: Barrow in Furness
Party	Candidate	Votes	%	±%
Labour	Albert Booth	22,687	53.24	
Conservative	Patrick Thompson	14,946	35.07	
Liberal	G. Thompson	4,983	11.69	
Majority		7,741	18.17	
Turnout		42,616	78.26	
Labour hold		Swing		

General election October 1974: Barrow in Furness
Party	Candidate	Votes	%	±%
Labour	Albert Booth	21,607	51.41	
Conservative	Richard Cecil	14,253	33.91	
Liberal	M.A. Benjamin	5,788	13.77	
Independent	V. Moore	384	0.91	
Majority		7,354	17.50	
Turnout		42,032	77.06	
Labour hold		Swing		

General election February 1974: Barrow in Furness
Party	Candidate	Votes	%	±%
Labour	Albert Booth	19,925	46.11	
Conservative	D.G.P. Bloomer	14,818	34.29	
Liberal	M. Benjamin	8,470	19.60	New
Majority		5,107	11.82	
Turnout		43,213	79.97	
Labour hold		Swing		

General election 1970: Barrow in Furness
Party	Candidate	Votes	%	±%
Labour	Albert Booth	22,400	56.09	
Conservative	Hal Miller	17,536	43.91	
Majority		4,864	12.18	
Turnout		39,936	73.69	
Labour hold		Swing		

==== Elections in the 1960s ====
General election 1966: Barrow in Furness
Party	Candidate	Votes	%	±%
Labour	Albert Booth	23,485	60.31	
Conservative	Richard W. Rollins	15,453	39.69	
Majority		8,032	20.62	
Turnout		38,938	76.78	
Labour hold		Swing		

General election 1964: Barrow in Furness
Party	Candidate	Votes	%	±%
Labour	Walter Monslow	22,197	55.13	
Conservative	Peter Davies	18,068	44.87	
Majority		4,129	10.26	
Turnout		40,265	78.03	
Labour hold		Swing		

==== Elections in the 1950s ====
General election 1959: Barrow in Furness
Party	Candidate	Votes	%	±%
Labour	Walter Monslow	23,194	54.68	
Conservative	Malcolm Metcalf	19,220	45.32	
Majority		3,974	9.36	
Turnout		42,414	81.72	
Labour hold		Swing		

General election 1955: Barrow in Furness
Party	Candidate	Votes	%	±%
Labour	Walter Monslow	22,792	53.22	
Conservative	Edward du Cann	20,033	46.78	
Majority		2,759	6.44	
Turnout		42,825	80.69	
Labour hold		Swing		

General election 1951: Barrow in Furness
Party	Candidate	Votes	%	±%
Labour	Walter Monslow	26,709	56.91	
Conservative	Kenneth F. Lawton	20,225	43.09	
Majority		6,484	13.82	
Turnout		46,934	86.18	
Labour hold		Swing		

General election 1950: Barrow in Furness
Party	Candidate	Votes	%	±%
Labour	Walter Monslow	26,342	56.27	
Conservative	Wilfrid Sugden	16,793	35.87	
Liberal	Herbert Alexander Anderson Jardine	3,678	7.86	New
Majority		9,549	20.40	
Turnout		46,813	87.83	
Labour hold		Swing		

==== Elections in the 1940s ====
General election 1945: Barrow in Furness
Party	Candidate	Votes	%	±%
Labour	Walter Monslow	25,939	65.5	▲15.8
Conservative	Jonah Walker-Smith	13,648	34.5	▼15.8
Majority		12,291	31.0	N/A
Turnout		39,587	79.7	▼5.7
Labour gain from Conservative		Swing	▲15.8	

==== Elections in the 1930s ====
General Election 1939–40

Another General Election was required to take place before the end of 1940. The political parties had been making preparations for an election to take place and by the Autumn of 1939, the following candidates had been selected;

- Conservative: Jonah Walker-Smith
- Labour: Ronald McKinnon Wood

General election 1935: Barrow in Furness
Party	Candidate	Votes	%	±%
Conservative	Jonah Walker-Smith	18,136	50.3	▼6.5
Labour	Percy Barstow	17,919	49.7	▲6.5
Majority		217	0.6	▼12.8
Turnout		36,055	85.4	▼3.5
Conservative hold		Swing	▼6.5	

General election 1931: Barrow in Furness
Party	Candidate	Votes	%	±%
Conservative	Jonah Walker-Smith	20,794	56.8	▲12.8
Labour	David Adams	15,835	43.2	▼12.8
Majority		4,959	13.4	N/A
Turnout		36,629	88.9	▲2.1
Conservative gain from Labour		Swing	▲12.8	

==== Elections in the 1920s ====
General election 1929: Barrow in Furness
Party	Candidate	Votes	%	±%
Labour	John Bromley	19,798	56.0	▲4.8
Unionist	Kenneth McDonald Cameron	15,551	44.0	▼4.8
Majority		4,247	12.0	▲9.6
Turnout		35,349	86.8	▼3.1
Labour hold		Swing	▲4.8	

General election 1924: Barrow in Furness
Party	Candidate	Votes	%	±%
Labour	John Bromley	15,512	51.2	▲5.2
Unionist	Daniel Somerville	14,802	48.8	▲1.3
Majority		710	2.4	N/A
Turnout		30,314	89.9	▲3.6
Labour gain from Unionist		Swing	▲1.9	

General election 1923: Barrow in Furness
Party	Candidate	Votes	%	±%
Unionist	Daniel Somerville	13,996	47.5	▼5.6
Labour	John Bromley	13,576	46.0	▼0.9
Liberal	William Hood Wandless	1,931	6.5	New
Majority		420	1.5	▼4.7
Turnout		29,503	86.3	▼0.8
Unionist hold		Swing	▼2.3	

General election 1922: Barrow in Furness
Party	Candidate	Votes	%	±%
Unionist	Daniel Somerville	16,478	53.1	+2.5
Labour	John Bromley	14,551	46.9	▼2.5
Majority		1,927	6.2	▲5.0
Turnout		31,299	87.1	▲21.0
Unionist hold		Swing	▲2.5	

==== Elections in the 1910s ====
General election 1918: Barrow in Furness
Party	Candidate	Votes	%	±%
Unionist	Robert Burton-Chadwick	12,608	50.6	▲3.5
Labour	Charles Duncan	12,309	49.4	▼3.5
Majority		299	1.2	N/A
Turnout		24,917	66.1	▼20.7
Unionist gain from Labour		Swing	▲3.5	

General Election 1914–15:

Another General Election was required to take place before the end of 1915. The political parties had been making preparations for an election to take place and by July 1914, the following candidates had been selected;

- Labour: Charles Duncan
- Unionist: Francis Meynell

General election December 1910: Barrow-in-Furness
Party	Candidate	Votes	%	±%
Labour	Charles Duncan	4,810	52.9	▼2.3
Conservative	Francis Hugo Lindley Meynell	4,290	47.1	▲2.3
Majority		520	5.8	▼4.6
Turnout		9,100	86.8	▼4.8
Registered electors		10,478		
Labour hold		Swing	▼2.3	

General election January 1910: Barrow-in-Furness
Party	Candidate	Votes	%	±%
Labour	Charles Duncan	5,304	55.2	▼5.1
Conservative	Francis Hugo Lindley Meynell	4,298	44.8	▲5.1
Majority		1,006	10.4	▼10.2
Turnout		9,602	91.6	▲0.8
Registered electors		10,478		
Labour hold		Swing	▼5.1	

==== Elections in the 1900s ====
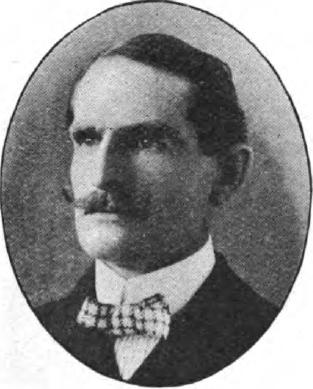
Duncan

General election 1906: Barrow-in-Furness
Party	Candidate	Votes	%	±%
Labour Repr. Cmte.	Charles Duncan	5,167	60.3	New
Conservative	Charles Cayzer	3,395	39.7	N/A
Majority		1,772	20.6	N/A
Turnout		8,562	90.8	N/A
Registered electors		9,426		
Labour Repr. Cmte. gain from Conservative		Swing	N/A	

General election 1900: Barrow-in-Furness
Party	Candidate	Votes	%	±%
Conservative	Charles Cayzer	Unopposed		
Conservative hold				

=== Elections in the 19th century ===
==== Elections in the 1890s ====
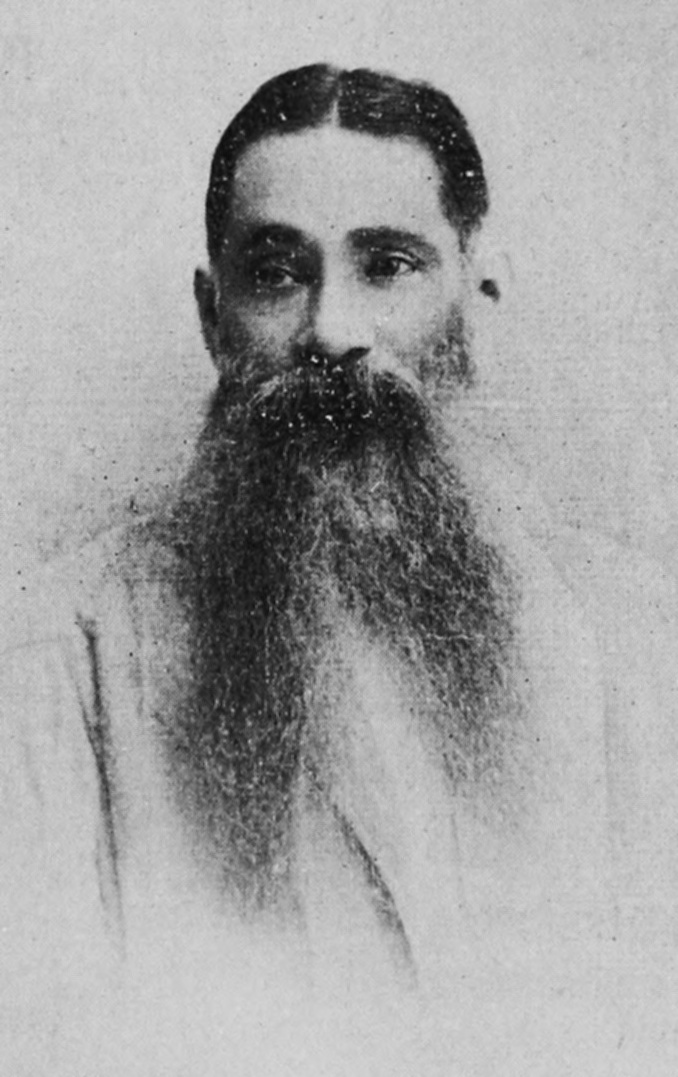
Bonnerjee

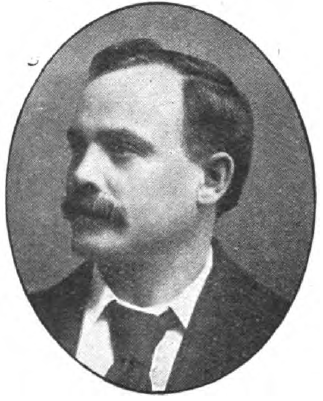
Curran

General election 1895: Barrow-in-Furness
Party	Candidate	Votes	%	±%
Conservative	Charles Cayzer	3,192	53.6	▲0.2
Liberal	Womesh Chunder Bonnerjee	2,355	39.5	▼7.1
Ind. Labour Party	Pete Curran	414	6.9	New
Majority		837	14.1	▲7.3
Turnout		5,961	89.4	▲0.3
Registered electors		6,665		
Conservative hold		Swing	▲3.7	

General election 1892: Barrow-in-Furness
Party	Candidate	Votes	%	±%
Conservative	Charles Cayzer	3,312	53.4	▼9.7
Liberal	James Duncan	2,890	46.6	▲9.7
Majority		422	6.8	▲19.4
Turnout		6,202	89.1	▲5.1
Registered electors		6,958		
Conservative hold		Swing	▼9.7	

1890 Barrow-in-Furness by-election
Party	Candidate	Votes	%	±%
Liberal	James Duncan	1,944	38.2	▲1.3
Conservative	Herbert Henry Wainwright	1,862	36.6	▼26.5
Independent Liberal	William Sproston Caine	1,280	25.2	New
Majority		82	1.6	N/A
Turnout		5,086	84.3	▲0.3
Registered electors		6,034		
Liberal gain from Liberal Unionist		Swing	▲13.9	

==== Elections in the 1880s ====
General election 1886: Barrow-in-Furness
Party	Candidate	Votes	%	±%
Liberal Unionist	William Sproston Caine	3,212	63.1	▲16.2
Liberal	John Ainsworth	1,882	36.9	▼16.2
Majority		1,330	26.2	N/A
Turnout		5,094	84.0	▼7.9
Registered electors		6,063		
Liberal Unionist gain from Liberal		Swing	▲16.2	

Ainsworth

1886 Barrow-in-Furness by-election
Party	Candidate	Votes	%	±%
Liberal	William Sproston Caine	3,109	58.7	▲5.6
Conservative	Gainsford Bruce	2,174	41.0	▼5.9
Independent Liberal	W H M Edmunds	15	0.3	New
Majority		935	17.7	▲11.5
Turnout		5,298	87.4	▼4.5
Registered electors		6,063		
Liberal hold		Swing	▲5.8	

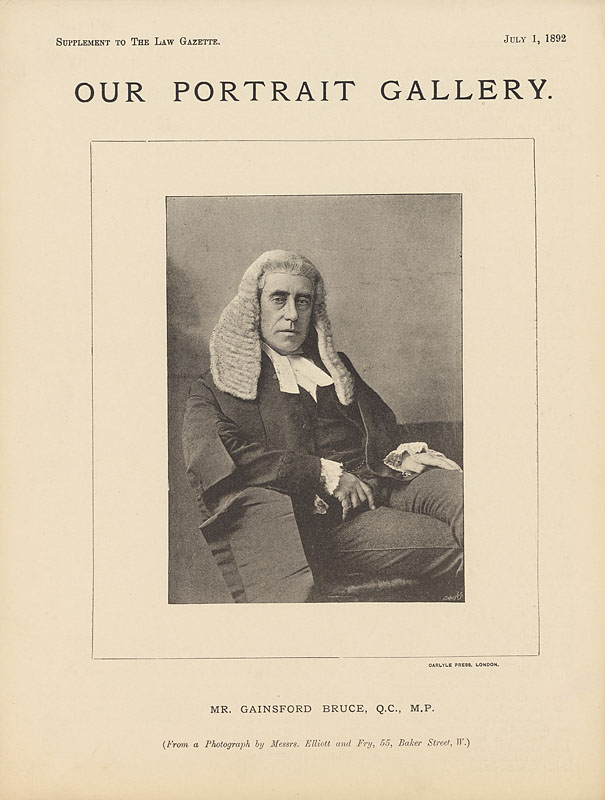
Bruce

General election 1885: Barrow-in-Furness
Party	Candidate	Votes	%	±%
Liberal	David Duncan	2,958	53.1	
Conservative	Henry Schneider	2,612	46.9	
Majority		346	6.2	
Turnout		5,570	91.9	
Registered electors		6,063		
Liberal win (new seat)				

The election was declared void on petition, causing a by-election.

== See also ==
- List of parliamentary constituencies in Cumbria
