= The Gatehouse, Monmouth =

The Gatehouse
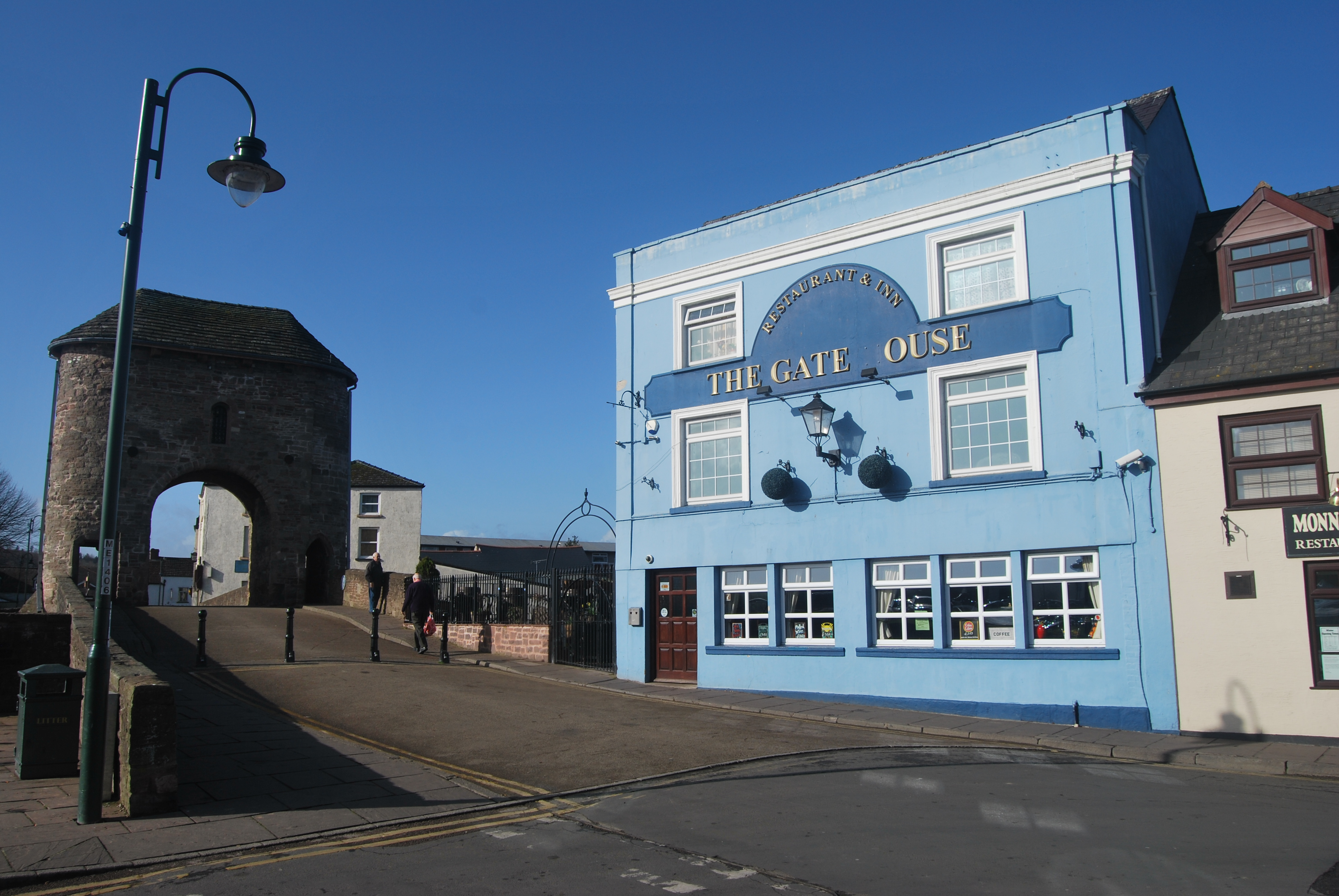
- The Gatehouse, Monmouth
- Interactive map of the The Gatehouse area
- Former names: The Barley Mow

General information
- Type: Public House (since 1812)
- Location: 125 Monnow Street, Monmouth, Wales
- Coordinates: 51.809192°N 2.719817°W
- Completed: Before 1812
- Landlord: Phil and Judi Ramsden

Website
- the-gate-house.com

The Gatehouse, also known as The Gate House, is a public house located next to Monnow Bridge in Monmouth, Wales. The pub was known as the Barley Mow until it changed its name in 1993. It is the only public house in Monmouth located beside a river. The pub has a restaurant area, seated balcony and a function room.

== History ==
The building was established as a public house by 1812, when a women's friendly society met in the building once a month. The women paid small amounts into a fund which they then withdrew in times of being unable to work due to childbirth, sickness, accidents or old age.

In 1822, William Jones became the licensee of the house "known as the Barley Mow", and from that point on he and his family ran the pub until the last quarter of the 19th century. In 1887 the Loyal Trafalgar Lodge of Druids Friendly Society had their Jubilee Dinner at the Barley Mow with over 100 guests, at which point Mr Teague was the landlord. Later licensees included the Wakin, Stead, and Harley families. By 1939, Ind Coope & Allsopp supplied Burton Ales to the pub; this continued until the late 20th century.

Originally a row of three cottages stood between Monnow Bridge and the Barley Mow, but these were demolished in the 1950s. Heather Hurley, in her book The Pubs of Monmouth, Chepstow and The Wye Valley, thought that these three cottages may have been the site of a former pub called The Dolphin between 1721 and 1858. That area is now The Gatehouse's beer garden, with a balcony overlooking the River Monnow and Monnow Bridge.

In Keith Kissack's 2003 book on Monmouth and its buildings he suggested that it was one of the best known inns in Monmouth for some 200 years. The vicar of Overmonnow in 1883 said that the Mayor had acted disgracefully, at the then Barley Mow, when the Mayor and 21 Elite men of the town had managed to drink 48 bottles of champagne, as well as some other wines while at the Mayors Luncheon.

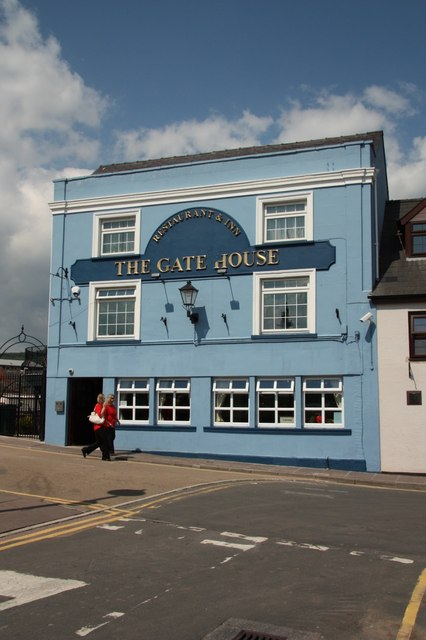
The Gatehouse

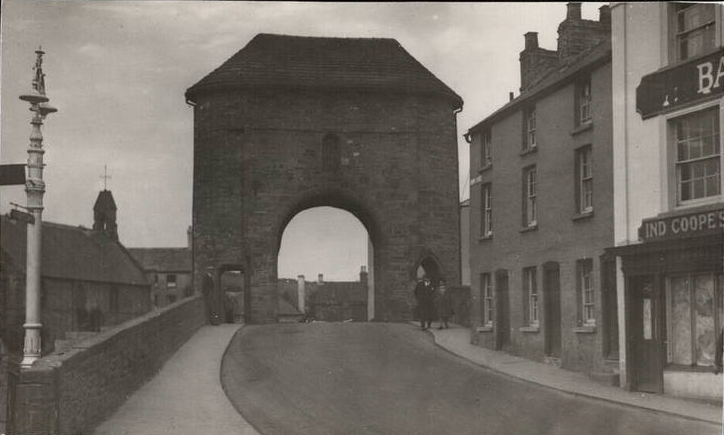
Monmouth Monnow Bridge 1930 from Town Side showing three cottages no longer there

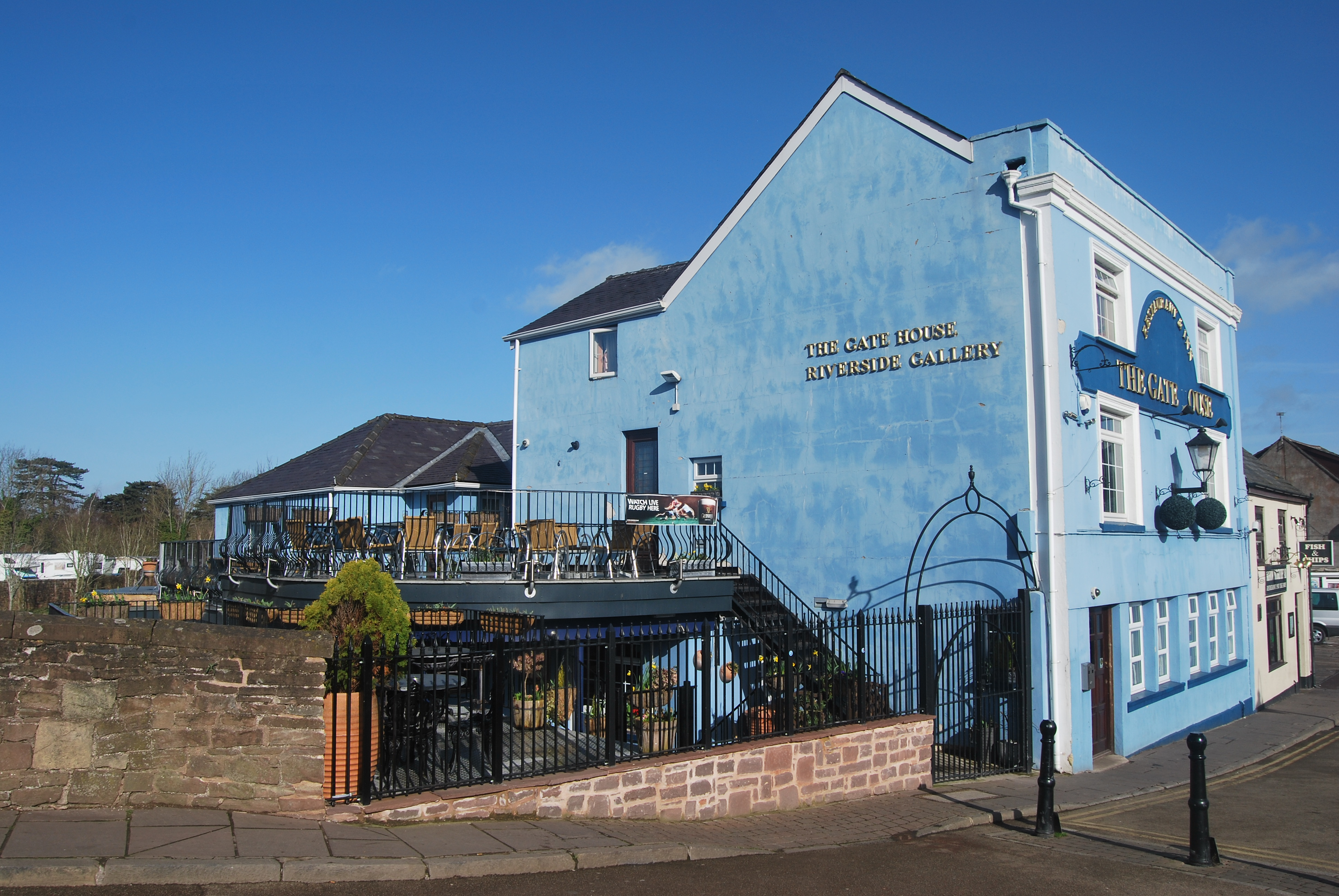
The Gatehouse Pub Monmouth - From the Monnow Bridge. Showing the Riverside Gallery where three houses once stood
