= Peter Gatehouse =

Welsh cricketer

Personal information
- Full name: Peter Warlow Gatehouse
- Born: 3 May 1936 (age 90); Caerphilly, Glamorgan, Wales
- Batting: Right-handed
- Bowling: Left-arm fast-medium

Domestic team information
- Years: Team
- 1957–1962: Glamorgan

Career statistics
| Competition | First-class |
|---|---|
| Matches | 19 |
| Runs scored | 85 |
| Batting average | 5.66 |
| 100s/50s | 0/0 |
| Top score | 20 |
| Balls bowled | 2,854 |
| Wickets | 53 |
| Bowling average | 29.26 |
| 5 wickets in innings | 3 |
| 10 wickets in match | 1 |
| Best bowling | 7/94 |
| Catches/stumpings | 3/– |
- Source: Cricinfo, 26 October 2012

Peter Warlow Gatehouse (born 3 May 1936) is a former Welsh cricketer and pharmacist. Gatehouse was a left-arm fast-medium bowler and tail-end right-handed batsman who played for Glamorgan from 1957 to 1962. He was born at Caerphilly, Glamorgan.

Gatehouse made his first-class debut for Glamorgan against Nottinghamshire at Stradey Park, Llanelli, in the 1957 County Championship. He made eighteen further first-class appearances for the county, the last of which came against Kent at the St Lawrence Ground, Canterbury. A bowler, Gatehouse took 53 wickets in his nineteen first-class matches, at an average of 29.26. His best bowling figures of 7/94 came against Middlesex at Lord's in 1958. He also took an additional three wickets in this match, giving him the only ten-wicket match haul of his career. He took a second five wicket haul against Somerset in the same season. A tailend batsman, Gatehouse scored a total of 85 runs at a batting average of 5.66, with a high score of 20.

While playing for Glamorgan, Gatehouse studied for a Ph.D. in pharmacy at Cardiff University. He chose to make his career in this profession, thereby ending his participation in first-class cricket. He continued to play senior club cricket in Cardiff.
