= The Gatehouse, Norwich =

Pub and Grade II* listed building in Norwich, Norfolk, England

The Gatehouse
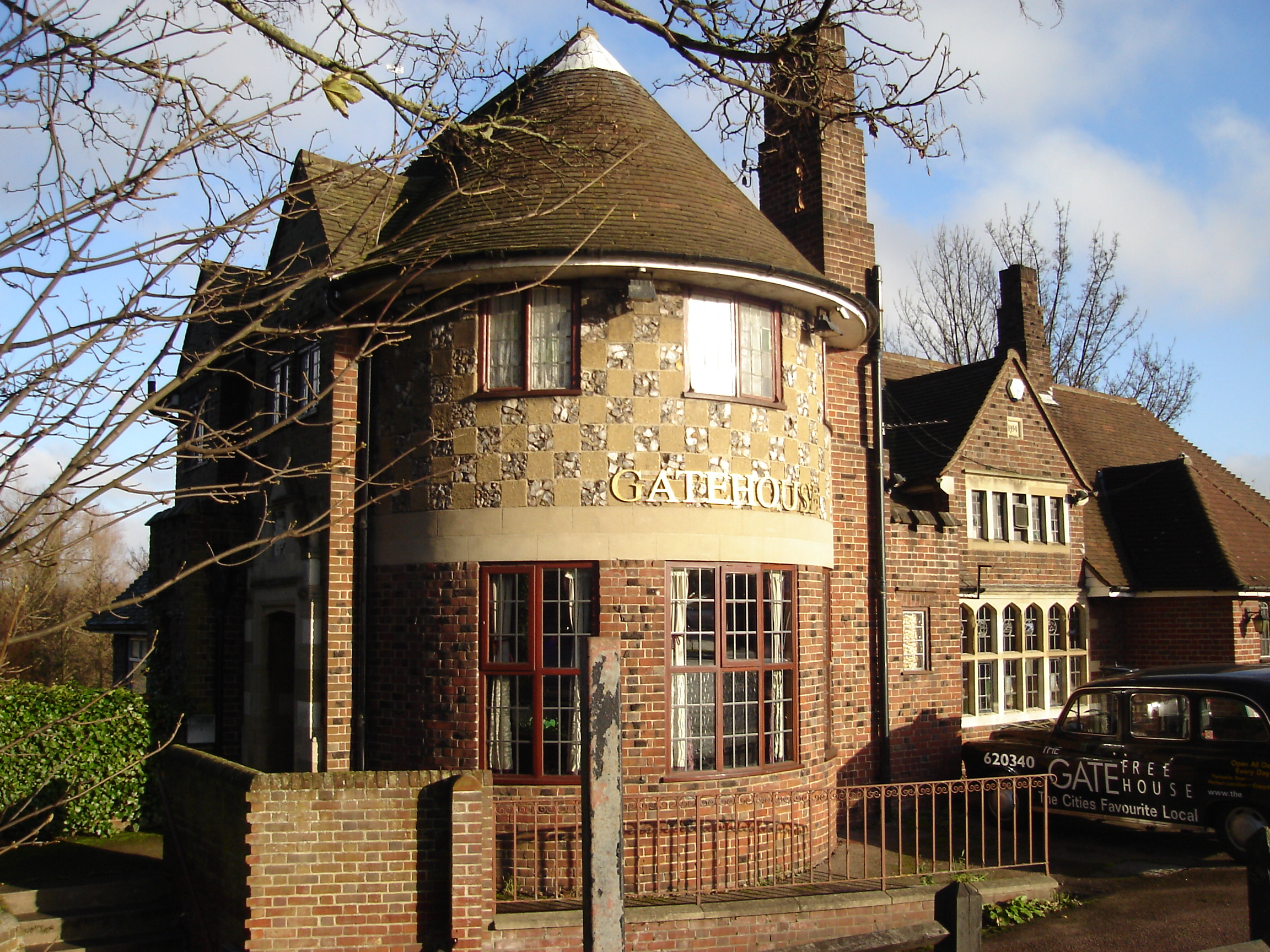
- The Gatehouse in 2009

- Location within Norfolk

General information
- Location: 391 Dereham Road, Norwich NR5 8QJ., Norwich, England
- Coordinates: 52°38′16″N 1°15′26″E
- Opened: 1935

Design and construction
- Main contractor: R.G. Carter
- Listed Building – Grade II

The Gatehouse is a Grade II listed building and former public house in Norwich, England.

It was built in 1934 for the Norwich-based Morgans Brewery, and replaced a 19th-century building of the same name. The builders were a local company, R.G. Carter. It was Grade II listed in 2015 by Historic England.

The Gatehouse closed in 2023. An initiative to raise money to buy the building and create a community-owned pub and meeting place lost a bid in 2025.

In 2026 a local Muslim group applied for planning permission to turn the Gatehouse into a mosque and community centre.
