= George Gatehouse =

Australian cricketer (1864–1947)

Personal information
- Full name: George Henry Gatehouse
- Born: 20 June 1864; Sorell, Tasmania, Australia
- Died: 25 January 1947 (aged 82); Toorak, Melbourne, Australia
- Batting: Right-handed
- Role: Wicketkeeper-batsman

Domestic team information
- Years: Team
- 1883/84-1899/1900: Tasmania

Career statistics
Competition	First-class
Matches	14
Runs scored	547
Batting average	21.03
100s/50s	1/2
Top score	105
Balls bowled	14
Wickets	0
Bowling average	–
5 wickets in innings	0
10 wickets in match	0
Best bowling	–
Catches/stumpings	12/1
- Source: Cricinfo, 17 September 2025

George Henry Gatehouse (20 June 1864 – 25 January 1947) was an Australian cricketer of the 1880s and 1890s who became a senior figure in the Commonwealth Public Service in Melbourne.

== Career ==
Gatehouse played 14 first-class matches for Tasmania between 1883 and 1900. He made his first-class debut on Tasmania's tour of New Zealand in 1883–84. In the second match against Otago he became only the second batsman in New Zealand first-class cricket to carry his bat, batting throughout the second innings to finish 54 not out in an innings total of 146. Later in his career he kept wicket, and was later considered one of Tasmania's best wicketkeepers. He made his highest score of 105 in his last first-class match, against New South Wales in the 1899/1900 season.

Gatehouse worked in the Tasmanian State Audit Office, before joining the Commonwealth Audit Office and moving to live in Melbourne in 1901. On several occasions he served as acting auditor-general. When he retired in June 1929, he was Secretary and Chief Inspector of the Auditor-General's Office.

== Personal life ==
Gatehouse married Florence Allanby in Cressy, Tasmania, in February 1888. They had a son and two daughters. He died at his home in the Melbourne suburb of Toorak in January 1947, aged 82.

Gatehouse's son Frank was a successful actor on stage and screen in the UK and US under the stage name "Frank Allenby". He died in 1953.
