= The Gatehouse (charity) =

Coordinates: 43.5988°N 79.5131°W

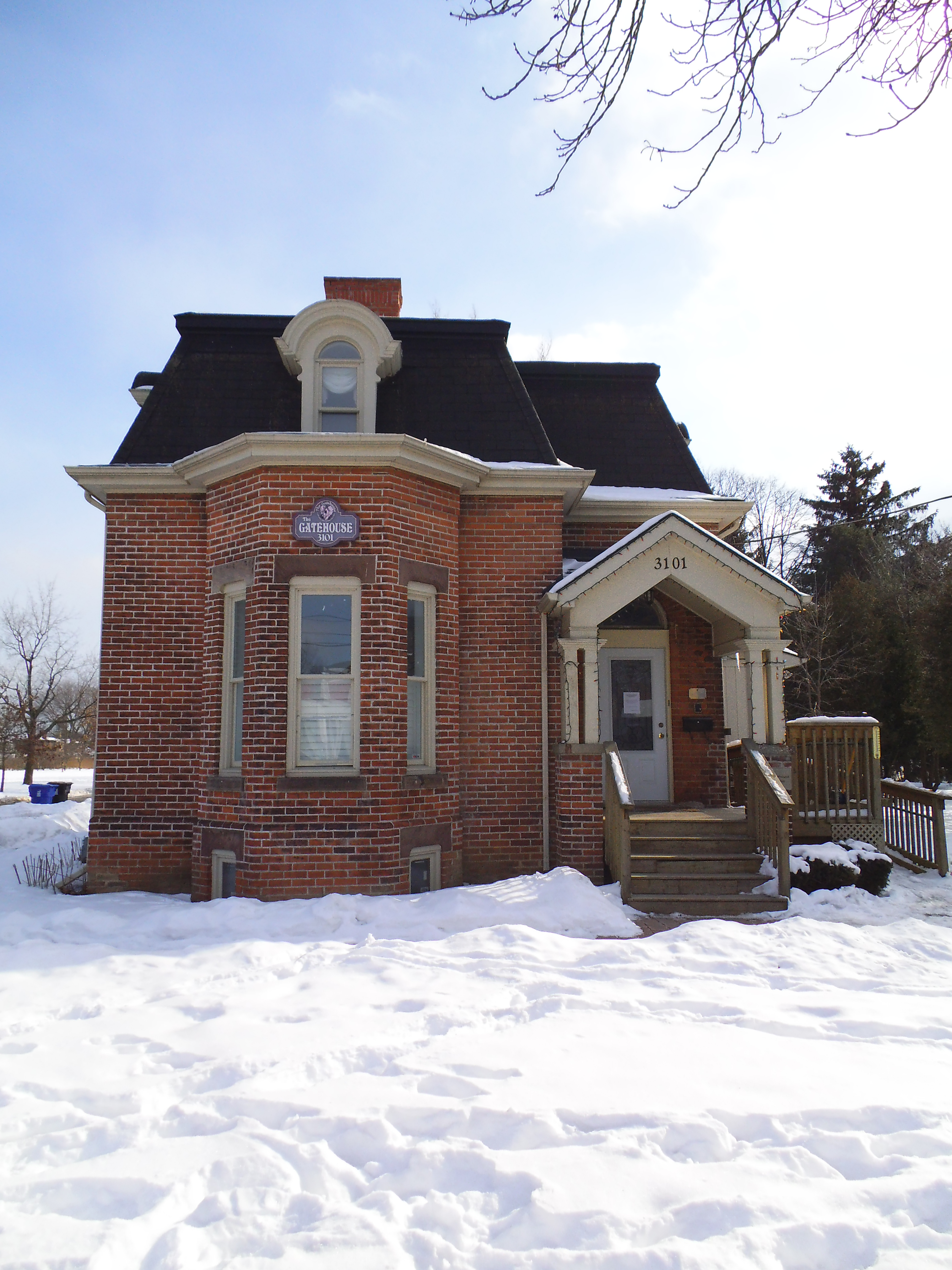
- Headquarters: 3101 Lake Shore Blvd West
- Location: Toronto, Ontario, Canada
- Key people: Rita Grenci, Chair
- Website: http://www.thegatehouse.org/

The Gatehouse is a registered charity based in the Etobicoke area of in Toronto, Ontario, Canada that treats survivors of child sexual abuse. The centre has helped more than 15,000 survivors of childhood sexual abuse since it opened in 1998.

== History ==
The headquarters for the charity was the doctor's house for the Lakeshore Psychiatric Hospital. It was abandoned for over 30 years and restored for use by volunteers. The vision of The Gatehouse and the restoration of the house was the creation of Arthur Raymond Lockhart who had the idea to reach out to survivors of child abuse within the community.

== Awards and recognition ==
- In 2000, The Ministry of the Attorney General's Office for the Victims of Crime designated The Gatehouse a "best practice site" in Ontario in a report, A Voice for Victims.
- In June 2003, The Gatehouse was awarded the City of Toronto Mayor's Community Safety Award
- In September 2003, The Gatehouse was awarded the Ruth Atkinson Hindmarsh Award from the Atkinson Foundation
- In 2018, the charity received Attorney General's Victim Services Awards of Distinction
