= Burnmoor =

Burnmoor may refer to:

- Bournmoor, a village in County Durham, England, previously known as Burnmoor
- Burnmoor, Cumbria, area near Eskdale in Cumbria, England
- Burnmoor stone circles above Eskdale in Cumbria, England
- Burnmoor Tarn above Eskdale
- Burn Moor, hill near Duddon Valley in Cumbria, England
