= Listed buildings in Eskdale, Cumbria =

Eskdale is a civil parish in the Cumberland district of Cumbria, England. It contains 29 listed buildings that are recorded in the National Heritage List for England. Of these, one is listed at Grade II*, the middle of the three grades, and the others are at Grade II, the lowest grade. The parish is in the Lake District National Park; it contains the villages of Eskdale Green and Boot, and the surrounding countryside, moorland and mountains. In the parish is Long Rigg Farm, a model farm; the farmhouse, many of the farm buildings, and surrounding structures are listed. Most of the other listed buildings are houses and associated structures, farmhouses, and farm buildings. In addition the listed buildings include a church, a corn mill, two bridges, and a telephone kiosk.Rigg cottages are 18th century cottages that have been converted from the former manor house. The ghost of Mary Rigg is said to have roamed the corridors and rooms of the old manor house and can now be seen in any one of the 3 cottages.

== Key ==
Grade	Criteria
II*	Particularly important buildings of more than special interest
II	Buildings of national importance and special interest

== Buildings ==
Name and location	Photograph	Date	Notes	Grade
St Catherine's Church; 54.39111°N 3.27061°W		14th century	The church has been altered and extended, and it was restored in 1881 by Paley and Austin. It is in stone with a slate roof, and consists of a nave and a chancel in a single cell, with a gabled south porch. The east window has three lights with Decorated tracery, the other windows are mainly 19th-century mullioned replacements. On the west gable is a bellcote, and on the east gable is an apex cross.	II
Eskdale Corn Mill; 54.39914°N 3.27008°W		1547	The water mill was extended, and a second water wheel was added, in the 18th century. The mill is built in stone with quoins, and has slate roofs with stone ridges. The mill is on a sloping site, and has a T-shaped plan and two low storeys. On the east side are two 12 feet (3.7 m) overshot water wheels, and inside the mill is intact wooden machinery.	II*
Dalegarth Hall; 54.38980°N 3.27973°W		16th century	Originally a manor house, it has since been extended and altered, including a partial demolition in about 1750. The house is in stone with quoins, and has a slate roof with stone ridges. It has an S-shaped plan and two storeys. There is a plank door, and the windows are 20th-century replacement casements. The chimneys have cylindrical stacks on stone bases. Inside there is an inglenook and a chamfered bressumer.	II
Brotherilkeld Farmhouse, stable and barn 54.40204°N 3.21417°W		17th century	The stable and barn were added probably in the 18th century. The buildings are in stone with slate roofs. The house has an L-shaped plan, with two storeys, three bays, and a rear wing. On the front is a central gabled porch, two casement windows in the ground floor, and two sash windows above, all with timber lintels. To the left is a single-bay stable with a plank door and a ventilation slit, and further to the left is a barn with a wagon door.	II
Doctor Bridge; 54.39561°N 3.24987°W		17th century (probable)	Originally a packhorse bridge over the River Esk, it was widened in 1734 for a local doctor. The bridge is in stone and consists of a single segmental arch with a span of about 30 feet (9.1 m). The roadway is about 9 feet (2.7 m) wide, and the bridge has a parapet about 3 feet (0.91 m) high.	II
Former farmhouse and barn 54.37728°N 3.31240°W	—	17th century	The buildings are in stone with a slate roof and a sandstone ridge. The house has two storeys, three bays, and a rear outshut. The windows on the front are casements, and at the rear are two mullioned windows. The barn to the left has two doorways, a wagon entrance, and ventilation slits. It contains re-used 16th-century cruck trusses.	II
Yattus; 54.38946°N 3.32146°W	—	17th century	A stone house that has a slate roof with coped gables. There are two storeys and three bays. In the centre is a gabled porch, The windows are sashes, the window above the porch being a horizontally-sliding sash.	II
Cottage and barn, Dalegarth Hall; 54.39003°N 3.27989°W	—	Late 17th to early 18th century	The cottage and barn are in stone with quoins, and a slate roof with a stone ridge. The cottage has two storeys and three bays. It has a central plank door, flanked by windows in chamfered surrounds with hood moulds. In the upper floor is a blocked window. The barn, attached to the right, has a wagon door, a window to the right, and three chamfered opening above, and it has an upper-cruck roof.	II
Bridge over Whillan Beck at Eskdale Corn Mill; 54.39892°N 3.27019°W		Early 18th century (probable)	Originally a packhorse bridge, later a road bridge, it is in stone and consists of a single segmental arch. The span of the bridge is about 25 feet (7.6 m), the roadway is about 7 feet (2.1 m) wide, and it has parapets about 3 feet (0.91 m) high.	II
Forge House, barn, stable, and byres 54.38186°N 3.31488°W		1750	A farmhouse with extensions added on both sides in the late 18th or early 19th century, all under a common slate roof. The house is pebbledashed with quoins, and it has two storeys and four bays. There is a moulded porch, and the windows are sashes. The outbuilding in the left has a segment-headed wagon door, two plank doors, and a loft door. The outbuilding to the right has two plank doors.	II
Boot House and Whillanside; 54.39880°N 3.26980°W	—	18th century	Originally a house and an outbuilding, later two houses, they are in stone with slate roofs. The houses have two storeys and four bays. Most of the windows are sashes, and on the font of Boot House is a gabled porch.	II
Barn, Whillanside; 54.39870°N 3.26993°W	—	18th century (probable)	The barn is in stone and has a slate roof with a stone ridge. It contains a segment-headed wagon entrance, with a casement window to the left and a plank door to the right. There is another plank door on the west front.	II
Bridge End Farmhouse; 54.39864°N 3.27024°W	—	18th century (probable)	The farmhouse is in stone with quoins, and has a slate roof. There are two storeys and three bays. The doorway and windows, some of which are casements, have segmental heads.	II
Barn, Bridge End Farm; 54.39873°N 3.27038°W	—	18th century (probable)	The barn has been altered and extended. It is in stone with quoins, and has a slate roof with a stone ridge. There are two storeys, and it contains a wagon door flanked by doors, and at the left is a loft door. To the south is an extension with two doors and a window.	II
Building southwest of Eskdale Corn Mill; 54.39901°N 3.27013°W	—	Mid to late 18th century (probable)	A stone outbuilding with quoins, and a slate roof that has a stone ridge with ball finials. It has two storeys and one bay. On the north front is a doorway with a window above, and on the west front steps lead up to a first floor door.	II
Barn, Forge House; 54.38189°N 3.31516°W	—	Early to mid 19th century (probable)	The barn is in granite, and has quoins and a green slate roof. It has a rectangular plan, with three bays, and outshuts on the south and west sides. On the east side is a cart entrance, ventilation slits, and a blocked door and window. There are owl holes in the north and south gables.	II
Long Rigg Farmhouse; 54.39378°N 3.32779°W	—	Early to mid 19th century (probable)	A farmhouse and cottage combined into one dwelling, it is in stone, partly roughcast, with a Cumberland slate roof. It consists of a main range with a double-depth plan, a small extension at the left, and a set back wing at the right. The main range has two and three storeys at the same level, four bays, and a doorway with a fanlight. The left extension has external steps leading to a loft door, and the right wing has two low storeys. The windows vary, most of them being sashes.	II
Mite Villa; 54.39384°N 3.32810°W	—	Early to mid 19th century (probable)	A house in roughcast granite that has a slate roof with oversailing eaves. There are two low storeys and two bays, with lean-to extensions at the sides. On the front are two square-headed doorways, one sash window, the other windows being top-hung casements.	II
Former smithy and cottage, Long Rigg Farm; 54.39411°N 3.32728°W	—	Early to mid 19th century (probable)	The buildings are in granite with sandstone lintels, quoins, and a slate roof. There are two storeys and two bays. On the front are two square-headed doorways, and one 20th-century casement window, the other windows having fixed glazing. Inside the smithy is a granite forge and leather bellows.	II
Gate House; 54.39022°N 3.32052°W		1896–1901	Originally a country house, with later additions including a tower, and then used as an outward bound centre. It is in granite with sandstone dressings, quoins, string courses, and a slate roof. The house has two storeys, and the tower has three, with a castellated parapet and corner turrets. On the front of the house is a full-height porch and a bay window. The windows are mullioned and transomed.	II
Barn and shippon, Long Rigg Farm; 54.39391°N 3.32722°W		1903	The barn and shippon are part of a model farm. They are in granite with sandstone dressings, quoins, and a slate roof with coped gables and apex finials. There is a rectangular plan, two storeys, and five bays. On the side facing the farmyard are five segmental-headed windows with chamfered sills and granite voussoirs, and a loading door and ventilation slits above. At the rear is a gabled porch and a wagon doorway.	II
Boundary wall, Long Rigg Farm; 54.39373°N 3.32717°W	—	1903 (probable)	The wall surrounds the farmyard of a model farm, linking the various buildings and forming a rectangular plan. It is in granite with battlements, about 2 metres (6 ft 7 in) high, and contains gateways and steps.	II
Cart-shed and loose-boxes, Long Rigg Farm; 54.39404°N 3.32688°W	—	1903 (probable)	The building is in granite with a slate roof. It has an L-shaped plan, with a four-bay cart shed, and a wing at the rear containing two loose boxes. The cart shed has an open front with four square piers, and a solid gable wall to the left. The loose boxes have stable doors with quoined surrounds, and a segmental-headed window between them.	II
Manure shed, Long Rigg Farm; 54.39379°N 3.32745°W	—	1903	The manure shed is in the centre of a model farm. It is in granite with a pyramidal slate roof that has oversailing eaves. The shed has an almost square plan, and is in a single storey. There are square piers at the corners and the centres of three sides, joined by low walls.	II
Multifunctional building, Long Rigg Farm; 54.39369°N 3.32735°W	—	1903	The building is part of a model farm. It is in granite with sandstone dressings, quoins and a slate roof. The building has a rectangular plan, 5 1/2 bays, and one storey. On the front are five square-headed windows with sandstone lintels, and at the rear are five segmental-headed windows.	II
Pigsties, Long Rigg Farm; 54.39379°N 3.32702°W	—	1903	Part of a model farm, there is a range of four pigsties with a bull-pen at the left end, and pens in front of them. They are in granite with quoins and a slate roof. The building has a rectangular plan, and is in a single storey with lofts. The pigsties have square-headed doorways, the pens are separated by stone slabs, and in the front is a wall with gates and feeding troughs. The bull-pen has a segmental-headed doorway, and at the front are high battlemented walls. External steps lead up to the loft, which contains ventilation slits.	II
Stable block, Long Rigg Farm; 54.39390°N 3.32753°W	—	1903	The stable block is part of a model farm. It is in granite with sandstone dressings, quoins and a slate roof. The building has a rectangular plan, with a tack room, and two storeys. There are three segmental-headed windows with chamfered sills and granite voussoirs, two square-headed doorways with sandstone lintels, and ventilation slits. At the rear are two openings, a window, and loading doorways above.	II
War memorial 54.39376°N 3.27773°W		1920	The war memorial stands in an enclosure with drystone walls between Boot and Dalegarth. It is in granite, and consists of a wheel-head cross on a tapering shaft with a single-stepped base, On the cross is a central boss and carved circles, and on the shaft is an inscription and the names of those lost in the two world wars.	II
Telephone kiosk 54.39982°N 3.21540°W		1935	A K6 type telephone kiosk, designed by Giles Gilbert Scott, on Hardknott Pass. Constructed in cast iron with a square plan and a dome, it has three unperforated crowns in the top panels.	II
