= Eskdale Moor =

Eskdale Moor may refer to:

- Boat How, a hill in the English Lake District
- An area in Eskdale (Scotland)
