= Alice Rea =

- Born: 1854; Liverpool
- Died: 1901
- Occupation: Writer
- Parents: Daniel Key Rea (father); Elizabeth Russell (mother)
- Relatives: Russell Rea

Alice Rea (1854 – 1901) was a British writer of stories and a novel set in her native Cumbria and featuring Cumbrian dialect.

Alice Rea was born in 1854 in Liverpool, the daughter of Daniel Key Rea, a coal merchant, and Elizabeth Russell. Her brother was the politician Russell Rea. The family lived in Eskdale, Cumbria and she spent her whole life in the village of Eskdale Green.

The title story in her collection of short stories, The Beckside Boggle and Other Lake Country Stories (1886), is a ghost story set on an isolated farm between Mitredale and Burnmoor.

== Bibliography ==
- The Beckside Boggle and Other Lake Country Stories. 1 vol. London: T. Fisher Unwin, 1886.
- Dalefolk. 3 vol. London: Hurst and Blackett, 1895.
