= Muncaster War Memorial =

War memorial in Muncaster, England

- United Kingdom
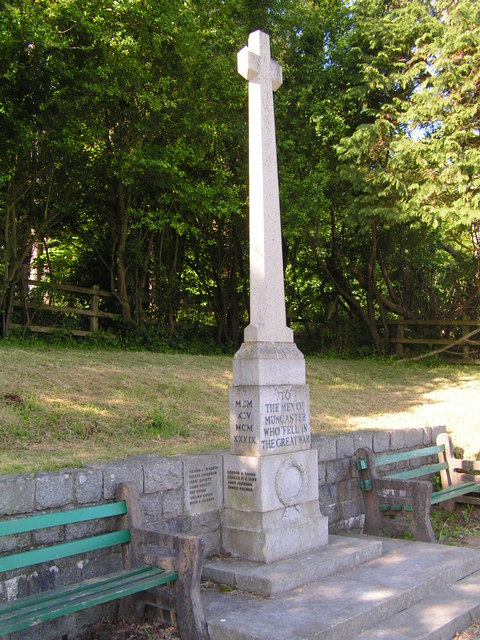
- For men from Muncaster killed in the First World War
- Unveiled: September 1922
- Location: 54.357594°N 3.401030°W; Muncaster, Borough of Copeland, Cumbria near Whitehaven
- Designed by: Sir Edwin Lutyens

Listed Building – Grade II
- Official name: Muncaster War Memorial and area wall
- Designated: 21 January 1985
- Reference no.: 1086636

Muncaster War Memorial is a First World War memorial in the parish of Muncaster on the west coast of Cumbria in the far north-west of England. The memorial is one of fifteen War Crosses designed by Sir Edwin Lutyens; it was unveiled in 1922 and is now a grade II listed building.

== Background ==
In the aftermath of the First World War and its unprecedented casualties, thousands of war memorials were built across Britain. Amongst the most prominent designers of memorials was the architect Sir Edwin Lutyens, described by Historic England as "the leading English architect of his generation". Lutyens designed the Cenotaph on Whitehall in London, which became the focus for the national Remembrance Sunday commemorations, as well as the Thiepval Memorial to the Missing—the largest British war memorial anywhere in the world—and the Stone of Remembrance which appears in all large Commonwealth War Graves Commission cemeteries and in several of Lutyens's civic war memorials. Muncaster's memorial is one of fifteen War Crosses by Lutyens, all sharing a broadly similar design.

Prior to the outbreak of the First World War, Lutyens established his reputation by designing country houses for wealthy clients. Many of Lutyens' commissions for war memorials originated with pre-war friends and clients; his connection with Muncaster came from Sir John Ramsden of Muncaster Castle. Lutyens originally travelled to the area in August 1918 to discuss alterations to the castle for Ramsden, which would have cost around £100,000; in the event nothing came of those plans, but Ramsden commissioned Lutyens to design the war memorial in April 1919. During his visit to Muncaster, Lutyens and his wife, Emily, exchanged letters discussing possible inscriptions for his Stone of Remembrance.

== History and design ==
The memorial stands on a junction of the A595 road between Barrow-in-Furness (the main town in the area) and Gosforth, at the top of the road to the village of Ravenglass on the west coast. One of Lutyens' fifteen War Crosses, it consists of a tapering shaft in Lakeland granite, to which the short arms are moulded close to the top. At the base of the cross is a rectangular plinth which is inscribed with the dedication: "TO THE MEN OF MUNCASTER WHO FELL IN THE GREAT WAR", and beneath that is a laurel wreath in relief carving—such wreaths appear on several of Lutyens' other memorials but Muncaster's is the only War Cross to bear one.

The whole memorial stands on a base of three shallow stone steps and is set within a recess in a stone wall. The names of the dead from the First World War are inscribed in stone panels in the wall and the names of the fallen from the Second World War were added at a later date.

The memorial was unveiled by a Mrs Cowan from Ravenglass on 24 September 1922, who lost three sons in the war.

Muncaster War Memorial was designated a grade II listed building on 21 January 1985. In November 2015, as part of the commemorations of the centenary of the First World War, Lutyens's war memorials were recognised as a "national collection" and all of his free-standing memorials in England were listed or had their listing status reviewed and their National Heritage List for England list entries were updated and expanded.

== See also ==
- Listed buildings in Muncaster
