= St Michael's Church, Muncaster =

Coordinates: 54.3568°N 3.3803°W

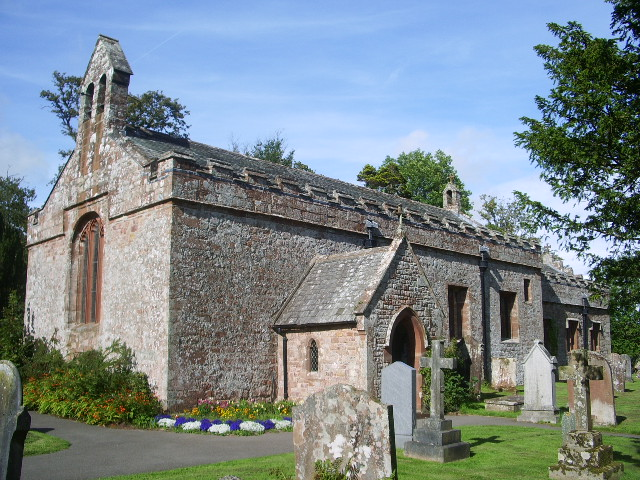
- St Michael's Church, Muncaster, from the southwest

- Location in Cumbria
- OS grid reference: SD 104,966
- Location: Muncaster Castle, Cumbria
- Country: England
- Denomination: Anglican
- Website: St Michael, Muncaster

History
- Status: Parish church

Architecture
- Functional status: Active
- Heritage designation: Grade I
- Designated: 8 September 1967
- Architect(s): Anthony Salvin (transept and restoration)
- Architectural type: Church

Specifications
- Length: Gothic, Gothic Revival

Administration
- Province: York
- Diocese: Carlisle
- Archdeaconry: West Cumberland
- Deanery: Calder
- Parish: Muncaster

Clergy
- Rector: Revd Anne Baker

St Michael's Church is in the grounds of Muncaster Castle, near Ravenglass, Cumbria, England. It is an active Anglican parish church in the deanery of Calder, the archdeaconry of West Cumberland, and the diocese of Carlisle. Its benefice is united with those of St Paul, Irton, St John the Baptist, Waberthwaite, and St Catherine, Boot. The church is recorded in the National Heritage List for England as a designated Grade I listed building.

== History ==
There has been a church on the site since 1140. The present church dates from the 16th century. There have been later additions and alterations, including a restoration and addition of a north transept in 1874 by Anthony Salvin. Salvin also restored the nearby Muncaster Castle for the Barons Muncaster. Repairs and a renovation were carried out for the 2000 millennium.

== Architecture ==
The church is constructed in stone rubble. The roofs are in slate with stone ridges and eaves. Its plan consists of a four-bay nave, a three-bay chancel, a north transept, and a south porch. There is a gabled double bellcote on the west end of the nave, and a Sanctus bellcote on its east end. The parapets of the nave and chancel are battlemented. There are blocked doorways on the north side of the nave, and on the south side of the chancel. The windows in the nave are mullioned, those in the chancel are in Perpendicular style, and those in the transept are Decorated.

Inside the church is a king post roof. There are two fonts, one probably dating from the 17th century with a square plan, and another dated 1860, consisting of an octagonal bowl on marble columns. The stained glass in the east and west windows, dating from about 1870, are by Hardman. Elsewhere are windows from the 1880s designed by Henry Holiday for Powell's. A rare ‘Doom’ window shows St. Michael and Christ at the Last Judgement whilst the side windows depict the archangels Michael, Raphael, Uriel and Gabriel. Also in the church are monuments to the Pennington family of Muncaster Castle. The single-manual pipe organ was built in 1883 by Forster and Andrews.

== External features ==
The east gateway to the churchyard is listed at Grade II. It probably dates from the 19th century, it is constructed in sandstone, and it rises to form a gable over the entrance. In the churchyard to the south of the church is a high cross, parts of which date from the Anglo-Saxon era, consisting of a base and a shaft with carved decoration. Set into the same modern base is a circular cross-head. The high cross is a scheduled monument.

== See also ==
- Grade I listed churches in Cumbria
- Grade I listed buildings in Cumbria
- Listed buildings in Muncaster
- List of church restorations and alterations by Anthony Salvin
