= Eskdale Corn Mill =

Mill in Eskdale, Cumbria, England

- Location within Cumbria
- 54°23′56.760″N 3°16′12.324″W
- Location: Boot, Cumbria, England

Site notes
- Governing body: Eskdale Mill & Heritage Trust

Listed Building – Grade II*
- Official name: Eskdale Corn Mill
- Designated: 21 January 1985
- Reference no.: 1086655

Listed Building – Grade II
- Official name: Bridge over Whillan Beck to south west of corn mill
- Designated: 21 January 1985
- Reference no.: 1086654

Listed Building – Grade II
- Official name: Building to south west of corn mill on east side of road at north end of bridge
- Designated: 21 January 1985
- Reference no.: 1336054

Eskdale Corn Mill, also simply known as Eskdale Mill, is a grade II* listed corn mill, together with associated buildings, in the village of Boot in the English county of Cumbria. The corn mill takes the form of a watermill powered by the Whillan Beck. Its associated buildings include an outbuilding and stone packhorse bridge over the beck, both of which are separately listed at grade II.

== See also ==
- Grade II* listed buildings in Cumbria
- Listed buildings in Eskdale, Cumbria
