= Patrick Gordon-Duff-Pennington =

British farmer, poet, and landowner (1930–2021)

Patrick Gordon-Duff-Pennington OBE (12 January 1930 – 9 January 2021), also known as Patrick of the Hills, was a Scottish farmer, poet, and landowner. He resided in Muncaster Castle, Ravenglass, Cumbria.

He served as Hill Farming Convenor of the National Farmers' Union of Scotland (NFU), Chairman of the Deer Commission for Scotland, Convenor of the Scottish Landowners Federation, County Chairman of the Cumbrian NFU, and an appointed member of the Lake District Special Planning Board. He was awarded the MBE and later the OBE for his services to agriculture.

== Life ==
Patrick Gordon-Duff was born in January 1930 and grew up in Moray, Scotland.

He was educated at Eton and Oxford. After university, he joined the Cameron Highlanders. He carried the Regimental Colours at Queen Elizabeth's Coronation Parade.

He married Phyllida Pennington, of the Penningtons of Muncaster Castle, in 1955, and added her surname to his already double-barreled name.

He and his wife turned Muncaster Castle into a popular tourist attraction visited by over 90,000 people a year.

After the Chernobyl disaster, he wrote to Mikhail Gorbachev to complain about the radioactive dust that had collected on the Cumbrian Fells. His letter was initially refused by the Russian Embassy as they did not believe his name was real on account of its length. Eventually the embassy did accept his letter and he became an active leader of the British-Soviet Friendship Society.

He published two books of poetry (Last Post and Reveille, 2014 and The Black Dog's Day, 2017) under the name "Patrick of the Hills", and an autobiography (Those Blue Remembered Hills, 2015).

Gordon-Duff-Pennington died on 9 January 2021 at the age of 90. He was survived by four daughters, eight grandchildren and three great-grandchildren. His wife had predeceased him in 2011.

== Selected publications ==
- Last Post and Reveille (Hayloft Publishing, 2014: ISBN 9781904524960)
- Those Blue Remembered Hill (Hayloft Publishing, 2015: ISBN 978 1 910237 10 6)
- The Black Dog's Day (Hayloft Publishing, 2017: ISBN 9781910237267)
