= St Catherine's Church, Boot =

Coordinates: 54.3911°N 3.2706°W

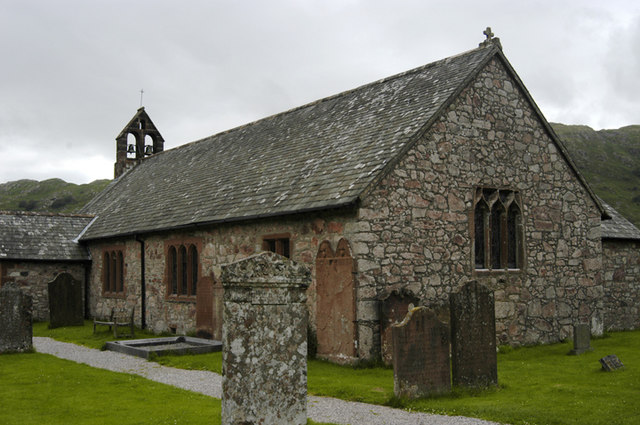
- St Catherine's Church, Boot, from the southeast

- Location in Cumbria
- OS grid reference: NY 176,003
- Location: Boot, Cumbria
- Country: England
- Denomination: Anglican
- Website: St Catherine, Boot

History
- Status: Parish church
- Dedication: Saint Catherine

Architecture
- Functional status: Active
- Heritage designation: Grade II
- Designated: 8 September 1967
- Architect: Paley and Austin (restoration)
- Architectural type: Church

Specifications
- Materials: Stone, slate roof

Administration
- Province: York
- Diocese: Carlisle
- Archdeaconry: West Cumberland
- Deanery: Calder
- Parish: Eskdale

St Catherine's Church is in the village of Boot in the English county of Cumbria. It is the Anglican parish church for Eskdale, and is in the deanery of Calder, the archdeaconry of West Cumberland, and the diocese of Carlisle. Its benefice is united with those of Irton, St Paul, Muncaster, St Michael, and St John, Waberthwaite.

The church stands by the side of the River Esk, some 0.6 miles (0.97 km) to the south of the centre of the village. It is recorded in the National Heritage List for England as a designated Grade II listed building.

== History ==
A church has been on the site since the 6th century. Local legend says that a 7th-century hermit lived near the church and established a holy well on Arment Hill; the same well is still used to draw water for baptisms. The present church was founded around 1125 by William de Meschines of Egremont Castle. The font is 14th- century and is carved with the symbol of a St Catherine's Wheel. The east window is also from the 14th century.

The present church dates from the 14th century, with later alterations and additions. It was restored in 1881 by the Lancaster architects Paley and Austin. They reseated the church, increasing its accommodation to 126, and added a vestry, at a cost of £750 (equivalent to £79,000 in 2025).

In the churchyard is a gravestone commemorating Thomas Dobson (died 1910), who was master of the Eskdale and Ennerdale Foxhounds for 53 years. Known as the "Huntsman's Grave", the stone is carved with Dobson's huntsman's horn and two projecting heads, one of a fox and one of a hunting dog.

== Architecture ==
=== Exterior ===
St Catherine's is constructed in random rubble. It has a slate roof with a stone ridge. The church has a simple plan, consisting of a single cell in four bays, and a south porch. At the west end is a gabled double bellcote, and there is a cross on the apex of the east end. The side windows are mainly 19th-century replacements of earlier windows, and are mullioned. The east window has three lights and contains Decorated-style tracery.

=== Interior ===
Inside the church is an octagonal font; its bowl has low-relief carving on each face. On the south wall of the church is a benefactors' board dated 1798. All the stained glass dates from between 1889 and 1896. The glass in the east and west windows is by Gibbs and Company, and that on the north and south sides is by A. Savell and Company. The glass in the east window depicts Saint Catherine, the Good Shepherd, and Saint Cecilia. Windows on the south side of the church depict the Annunciation, and on the north side the Last Supper. One of the bells in the bellcote was cast in 1445.

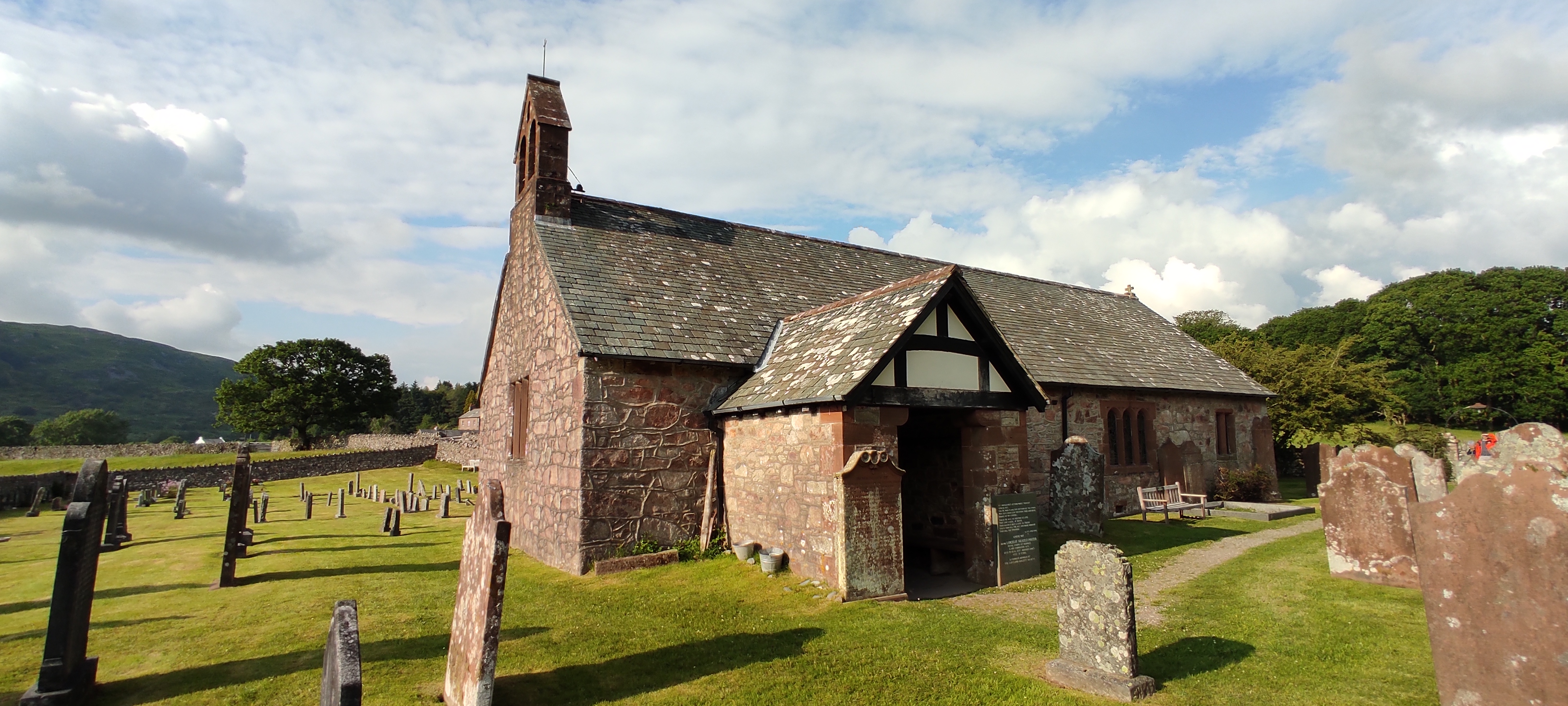

== See also ==
- Listed buildings in Eskdale, Cumbria
- List of ecclesiastical works by Paley and Austin
