= Muncaster =

Coordinates: 54.355643°N 3.3810747°W

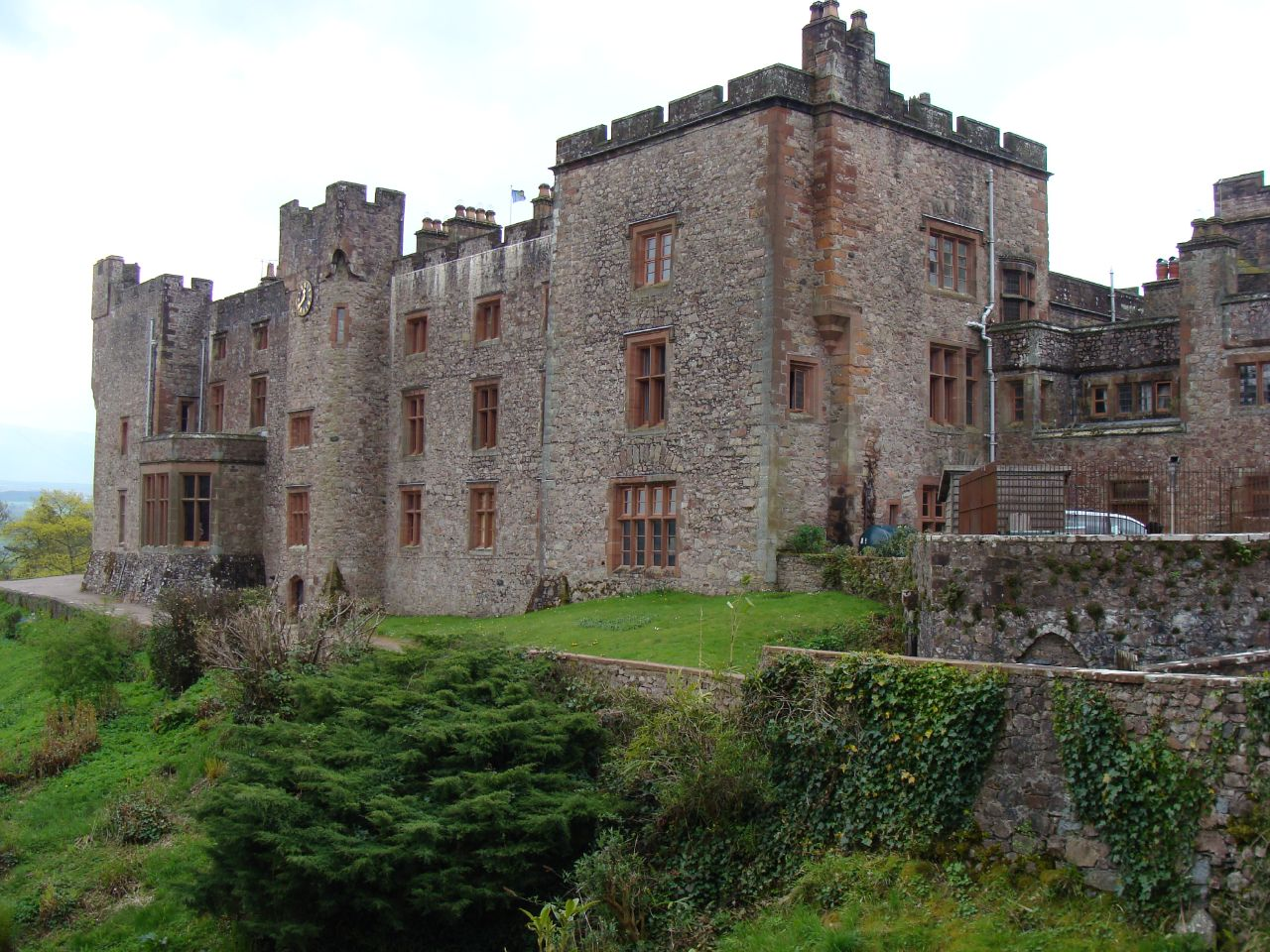
- Muncaster Castle

- Location within Cumbria
- Area: 29.4 km^{2} (11.4 sq mi)
- Population: 259 (Parish, 2021)
  - Density: 9/km^{2} (23/sq mi)
- Civil parish: Muncaster
- Unitary authority: Cumberland
- Ceremonial county: Cumbria
- Region: North West
- Country: England
- Sovereign state: United Kingdom
- Police: Cumbria
- Fire: Cumbria
- Ambulance: North West
- Website: www.muncaster-pc.gov.uk

Muncaster is a civil parish in the Cumberland district of Cumbria, England. The parish is 41 miles (66 km) south west of the city of Carlisle. The settlement of Muncaster itself consists of a small number of houses around Muncaster Castle and the adjoining St Michael's Church. The main settlement in the parish is the coastal village of Ravenglass. The parish also extends inland to include rural areas on either side of the lower reaches of the River Esk.

The neighbouring parishes (clockwise from north-west) are Drigg and Carleton, Irton with Santon, Eskdale, Ulpha, Waberthwaite and Bootle.

== History ==
The place was anciently called 'Meolceastre'. The name means 'Mula's/Muli's Roman camp', which perhaps refers to the Roman fort Glannoventa at Ravenglass. The name gradually evolved into 'Muncaster'. The surname Muncaster derives from the place.

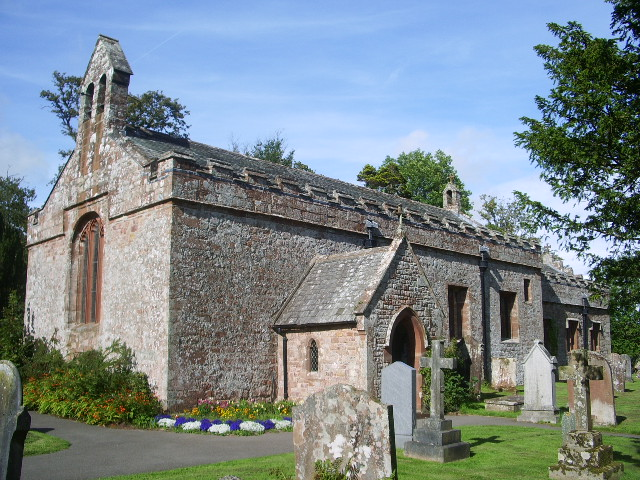
St Michael's Church, Muncaster

The small settlement of Muncaster is centred on Muncaster Castle (parts of which date back to the 13th century), which includes the parish church of St Michael (rebuilt in the 16th century) within its grounds.

The castle and church stand in extensive parkland on rising ground overlooking the Esk. The castle overlooked a ford on the river, which was used by the main coast road. Around 1810, a new Muncaster Bridge was built some distance to the east of the old ford. The road (since numbered as the A595) was subsequently diverted to cross the bridge, which remains the last road bridge over the river before it meets the sea at Ravenglass. The parkland also extends north-east onto the lower slopes of Muncaster Fell, an area of high ground between the Esk and the River Mite.

The Whitehaven and Furness Junction Railway built a line through the parish, with the first section from Whitehaven to Ravenglass railway station opening in 1849. The section south of Ravenglass, which crosses the Esk on the Eskmeals Viaduct, opened the following year. At its southern end, the line connected to the Furness Railway at Foxfield; the Whitehaven and Furness Junction Railway was subsequently absorbed by the Furness Railway in 1866. The route through Ravenglass now forms part of the Cumbrian Coast Line.

The Ravenglass and Eskdale Railway was opened in 1875 as a narrow-gauge railway for transporting iron ore from quarries in Eskdale to the main line station at Ravenglass. Since 1960, the line has operated as a heritage railway. It now has four stations in the parish of Muncaster.

== Governance ==
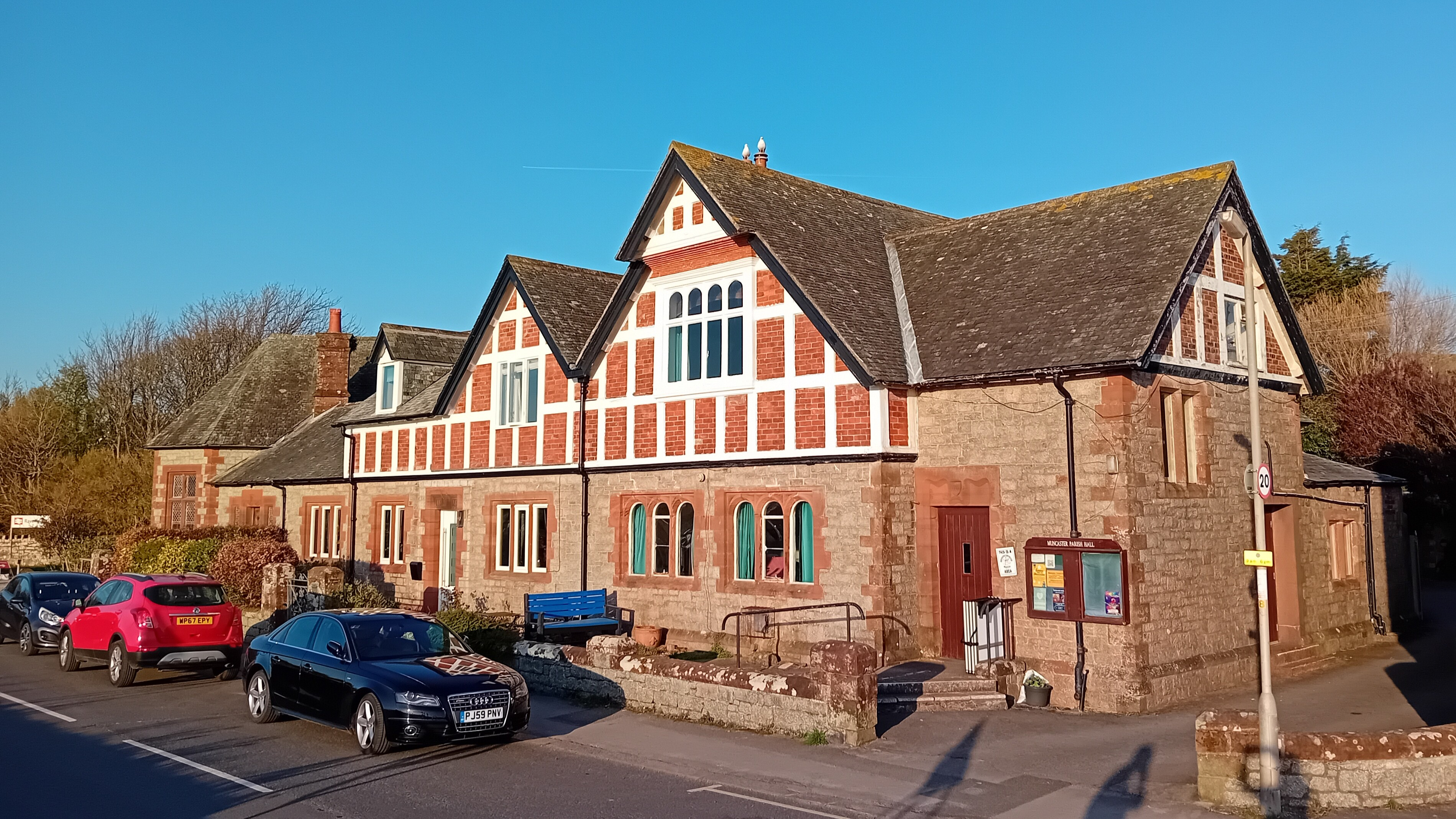
Muncaster Parish Hall, Main Street, Ravenglass

There are two tiers of local government covering Eskdale, at parish and unitary authority level: Muncaster Parish Council and Cumberland Council. The parish council generally meets at Muncaster Parish Hall, which is on Main Street in Ravenglass. The parish is wholly within the Lake District National Park, and so some functions are administered by the Lake District National Park Authority, notably planning.

At a national level, the parish is within the Barrow and Furness UK parliamentary constituency.

=== Administrative history ===
Muncaster was an ancient parish within the historic county of Cumberland. The parish was subdivided into two townships, called Birkby (generally south of the Esk) and Muncaster (generally north of the river). In 1886, a detached part of the parish of Millom comprising an area of high ground including Stainton Pike was transferred to Muncaster.

In 1974, Muncaster became part of the Borough of Copeland in the new county of Cumbria. Copeland was abolished in 2023 when the new Cumberland Council was created, also taking over the functions of the abolished Cumbria County Council in the area.

== Demography ==
The parish had a population of 259 at the 2021 census. The population was 290 in 2011.

== Features ==
There are 14 listed buildings in Muncaster.
