= Listed buildings in Muncaster =

Muncaster is a civil parish in the Cumberland district of Cumbria, England. It contains 14 buildings that are recorded in the National Heritage List for England. Of these, two are listed at Grade I, the highest of the three grades, one is at Grade II*, the middle grade, and the others are at Grade II, the lowest grade. The parish contains the coastal village of Ravenglass and countryside to the east. The most important building in the parish is Muncaster Castle; this and buildings associated with it, including St Michael's Church and associated structures, are listed. The other listed buildings are houses, farmhouses, farm buildings, and a war memorial.

== Key ==
Grade	Criteria
I	Buildings of exceptional interest, sometimes considered to be internationally important
II*	Particularly important buildings of more than special interest
II	Buildings of national importance and special interest

== Buildings ==
Name and location	Photograph	Date	Notes	Grade
Muncaster Castle; 54.35471°N 3.38083°W		13th century (possible)	The building originated as a fortified tower house, and was incorporated into a country house in the 18th century. In the 19th century were three phases of extension and remodelling, in 1862–66 and in 1872–74 by Anthony Salvin, and in the 1880s by C. J. Ferguson. The house is built in granite with sandstone dressings, embattled parapets, some with moulded eaves, and slate roofs with corniced stone chimneys on the corners. It has a U-shaped plan, with a tower at each end, and is mainly in two and three storeys. The entrance on the south front has a full-height porch. The windows are mullioned or mullioned and transomed.	I
St Michael's Church; 54.35677°N 3.38039°W		16th century	The church was restored and a transept was added in 1873 by Anthony Salvin. It is in stone with quoins, an embattled parapet on moulded eaves, and a slate roof with stone ridges and copings. The church consists of a nave, a south porch, a north transept, and a chancel. At the west end of the nave is a gabled double bellcote, and at the east end is a Sanctus bell. The windows in the nave are mullioned, those in the chancel are Perpendicular, and those in the transept are Decorated.	I
Farm building, Cropple How farm 54.36775°N 3.34282°W	—	Mid to late 16th century	The building originated as a cruck-built farmhouse in a single storey with an attic. In the early 18th century it was partly dismantled and rebuilt and extended into a two-storey building of seven bays, five for domestic use, and two for agricultural use. It is in granite with a slate roof. The building has retained early features, including probably the only surviving wattle and daub smokehood in the county, and an oak door with oak hinges.	II*
Pennington House; 54.35378°N 3.41053°W		17th century	The house was refronted in the 18th century and remodelled in the 19th century. It is pebbledashed and has a slate roof with a stone ridge. There are two storeys and a symmetrical front of five bays. In the centre is a doorway with a moulded hemispherical canopy. The windows are sashes with segmental heads.	II
Caddy tombstone 54.35666°N 3.38040°W	—	1726	The tombstone is in the churchyard of St Michael's Church. It consists of a stone with a shaped top, about 3.5 feet (1.1 m) high by about 3 feet (0.91 m) wide. There are inscriptions on both sides.	II
Barn and cottage, How Bank farm 54.35724°N 3.35754°W	—	1749	The barn and the cottage to the left are in stone with quoins, and have a slate roof with a stone ridge. They are in a single storey. The barn has a segmental-headed wagon entrance, ventilation slits, a partly blocked door and a window, and a blocked door. The cottage has a plank door and a casement window.	II
Cropple How farmhouse 54.36771°N 3.34254°W	—	Mid 18th century	The farmhouse is in pebbledashed stone, and has a slate roof with stone copings. There are two storeys and three bays. Steps lead up to a central porch with a moulded head. To the left of the porch is a double sash window, to the right is a 20th-century casement window, and in the upper floor are mullioned windows with casements; all the windows have stone surrounds.	II
How Bank farmhouse, barn and byre 54.35715°N 3.35727°W	—	Mid 18th century (probable)	The buildings are rendered with a slate roof. The house has quoins, an L-shaped plan, two storeys, four bays, and a rear wing. There is a gabled porch, a plank door, and sash windows. To the left is a two-bay threshing barn with a window and a winnowing door, and to the left of that is a byre with two doors and a loft door.	II
Entrance gateway and walls, Muncaster Castle; 54.35731°N 3.38965°W		Mid 18th century	The gateway consists of an archway, the inner side in ashlar sandstone, and the outer side in rusticated granite. The gateway has a semicircular arch containing wrought iron gates. On the outer side are stone medallions with coats of arms. The archway is flanked by walls with chamfered copings. The archway and the walls have embattled parapets, and at the ends of the walls are square piers with caps.	II
Monument, Muncaster Castle; 54.36516°N 3.37006°W		Mid 18th century (probable)	The monument is in the grounds of the castle. It is in granite, with an octagonal plan, and is about 65 feet (20 m) high. The monument is in three narrowing stages, and has quoins and bands between the stages. The bottom stage has an entrance with a pointed head, inside are niches in the angles, and it is lit by a ring of oculi in the vault. In the middle stage are cross-slits, and the top stage has a small window in a rusticated surround in each face, and a pyramidal roof.	II
Bay Horse; 54.35345°N 3.41067°W		1764	Originally an inn, later a private house, it is in pebbledashed stone, and has chamfered eaves and a slate roof with a stone ridge and copings. There are two storeys, three bays, and a rear outshut. In the centre is a porch with a moulded head, the door has a dated lintel, and the windows are casements in stone surrounds.	II
Yew Tree Cottage; 54.36906°N 3.35851°W	—	1833	The cottage is pebbledashed and has a slate roof with a stone ridge. There are two storeys and a symmetrical front of three bays. In the centre is a porch with a moulded head, and the windows are sashes.	II
East gateway, St Michael's Church; 54.35687°N 3.37954°W	—	Mid 19th century (probable)	The gateway is at the eastern entrance to the churchyard. It is in sandstone with chamfered coping, and rises to form a gable. The gateway is inscribed, and it contains a 20th-century wooden gate.	II
Muncaster War Memorial; 54.35758°N 3.40075°W		1922	The war memorial was designed by Edward Lutyens, and is in Lakeland granite. There are three square steps, a rectangular plinth, and a tapering shaft carrying a cross with short arms. On the plinth is a carved laurel wreath and an inscription. The memorial stands in a recess with the names of those lost on stone blocks in the walls.	II
