= Eskmeals Viaduct =

Railway viaduct in Cumbria, England

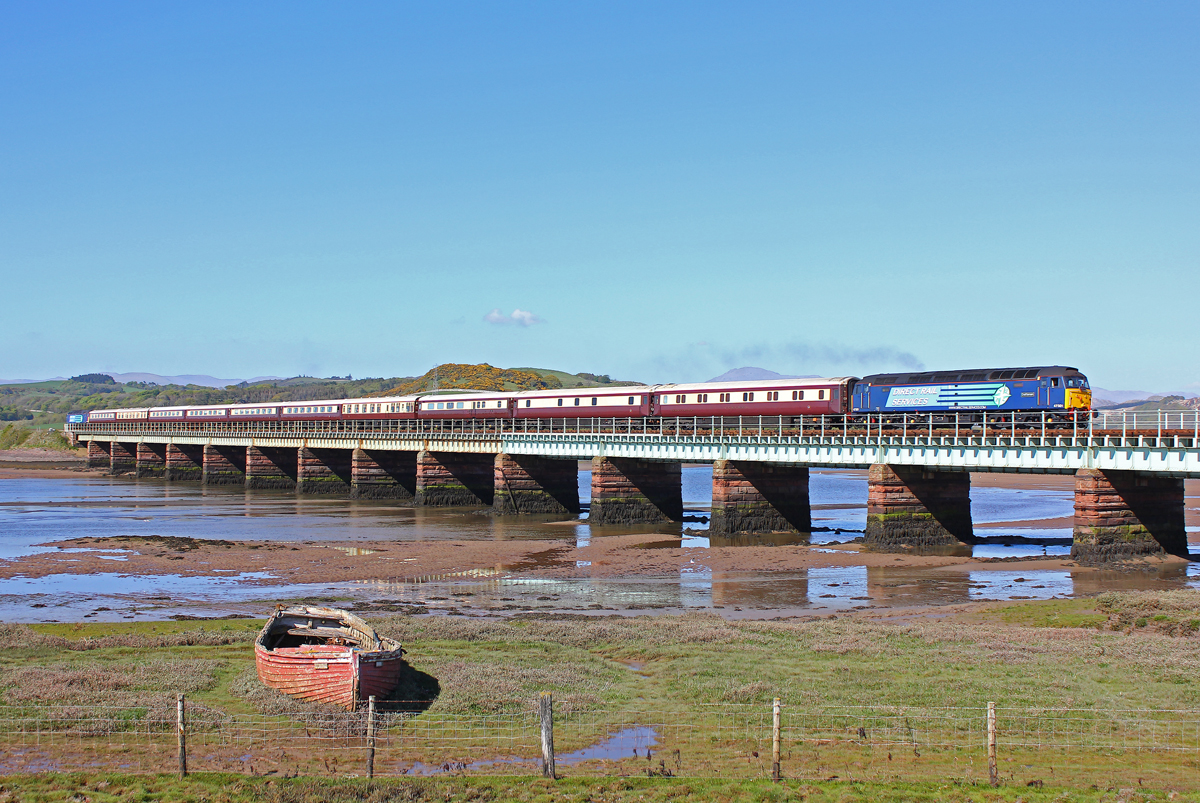
- A railtour crossing Eskmeals Viaduct
- Coordinates: 54.3368°N 3.4047°W
- OS grid reference: SD087942
- Crosses: River Esk
- Other name(s): Esk Viaduct; Newbiggin Viaduct
- Owner: Network Rail
- ELR no.: CBC1 141

Characteristics
- Total length: 16 chains (1,100 ft; 320 m)
- No. of spans: 18
- Clearance below: 10-foot-3-inch (3.12 m) (low tide)

Rail characteristics
- No. of tracks: 2
- Track gauge: 1,435 mm (4 ft 8 1/2 in) standard gauge

History
- Opened: 1868

Location
- Interactive map of Eskmeals Viaduct

Eskmeals Viaduct is a railway bridge spanning the River Esk near Ravenglass in Cumbria, England. Although the line opened in 1850, the current viaduct dates from 1868 and has stone piers. The previous viaduct was made entirely of timber and it caught fire two weeks before the line opened, being partially destroyed. The modern viaduct carries the Cumbrian Coast Line and has been renovated at least three times; first in the 1920s, and twice in the 2020s.

== History ==
The current Eskmeals Viaduct was completed in 1868 as part of the Furness Railway, and has 18 spans to a length of 16 chains (1,100 ft; 320 m) with the original red sandstone piers, crossing the River Esk and associated salt marshes in west Cumbria. The first bridge at the site, sometimes referred to as Esk Viaduct, (Note: Several other viaducts in Britain have been called Esk Viaduct such as one over the River South Esk at Montrose, known as the South Esk Viaduct, and sometimes the one straddling the Esk at Whitby, though that is more commonly known as Larpool Viaduct. Another viaduct over the River Esk north of Carlisle is sometimes referred to as Esk Viaduct, which was the name of the original structure, but improvement works for the creation of Kingmoor Marshalling yard, saw the viaduct replaced by an all metal structure in 1959, and it is known now as Metal Bridge.) was 320 yards (290 m) long, 25 feet (7.6 m) high at is maximum, and had 36 spans. The original structure was partially destroyed by fire at its southern end on 28 June 1850. As the structure was largely timber in construction, to prevent it spreading, workers destroyed a section in the middle leaving a damaged or destroyed section of 60 yards (55 m) in the 320-yard (290 m) viaduct. The line between Bootle and Ravenglass was opened on 8 July 1850, only two weeks after the viaduct was on fire. Repairs were estimated to have cost £600 and the contractors, Brown and Richardson, were praised in the press for their work in getting the viaduct rebuilt and open by early July. Work to convert this timber viaduct into one with stone piers and a wrought iron structure began in the winter of 1866–1867, with completion later in 1867. In 1898, a clause in an Act of Parliament of 1876 was enacted, (Customs Consolidation Act 1876 (39 & 40 Vict. c. 36)), which made the viaduct the southern limit of operations for the Port of Whitehaven.

The viaduct was restored in the 1920s and still has its original 1867 wrought iron girders. It was refurbished by Network Rail in 2020, and again in 2024, with the 2024 programme replacing many of the original timbers on the decking with fibre-reinforced foamed urethane (FFU) in a £4.5 million upgrade that increases its subsequent lifespan from 25 to 50 years. The viaduct crosses the River Esk in its extreme lower reaches as it combines with the Irt and the Mite forming the Ravenglass Estuary. The viaduct has a clearance underneath at low tide of 10 feet 3 inches (3.12 m). The strata underneath the viaduct in the bed of the river has been described as being a mixture of mud, sand and stones. A foot crossing exists in the river on the seaward side of the viaduct which is best used at low tide. Due to the low tidal crossing west of the viaduct which is always underwater, there is a proposal to route the England Coastal Path along the western edge of the viaduct on a new footbridge.

In May 2008, the viaduct was damaged by a fire caused by sparks from a passing steam train. The viaduct was closed for several days with passengers being bussed between Bootle and Ravenglass, with a cost that was rated as a "six-figure sum." The viaduct is still in daily use as part of the Cumbrian Coast Line between Carnforth and Carlisle via Barrow-in-Furness.

Besides being also known as Esk Viaduct, many local and national studies of the wildlife and littoral areas surrounding the bridge call it Newbiggin Viaduct (the hamlet of Newbiggin is located nearby). These studies have also shown that because of the viaduct's presence, a salt marsh has developed on the north-eastern side of the viaduct which was not there before the railway was built.
