= Muncaster Castle =

Castle in Cumbria, England

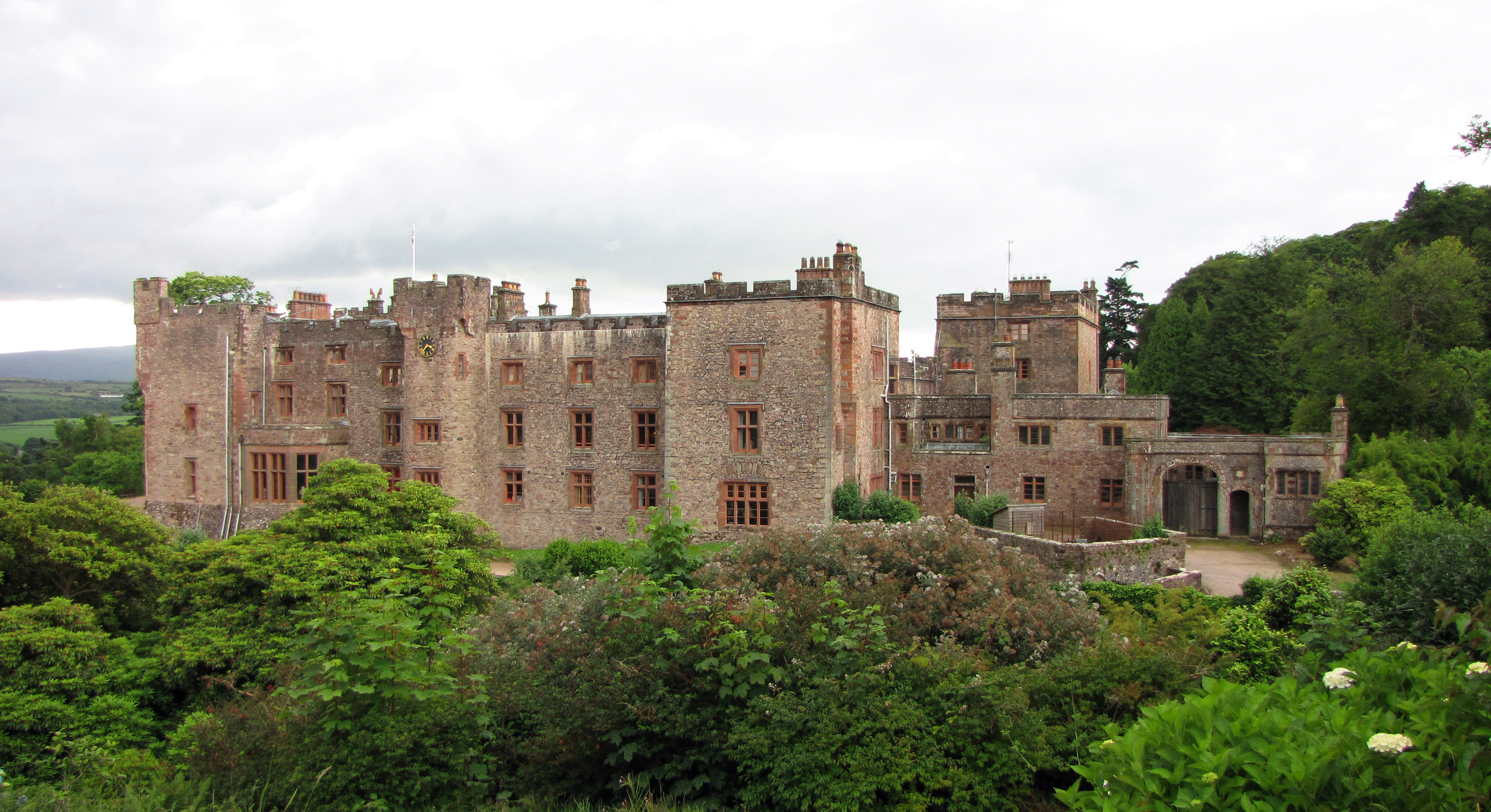

- Location within Cumbria
- 54°21′17″N 3°22′51″W
- Location: Lake District National Park

History
- Built: 13th century
- Rebuilt: 1862–1866

Site notes
- Area: Cumberland
- Architect: Anthony Salvin
- Owner: Private

Listed Building – Grade I
- Official name: Muncaster Castle
- Designated: 7 September 1967
- Reference no.: 1068780

Muncaster Castle is a privately owned castle in the parish of Muncaster, Cumbria, England. It stands overlooking the River Esk, about a mile east of the coastal village of Ravenglass. It is recorded in the National Heritage List for England as a designated Grade I listed building.

== History ==
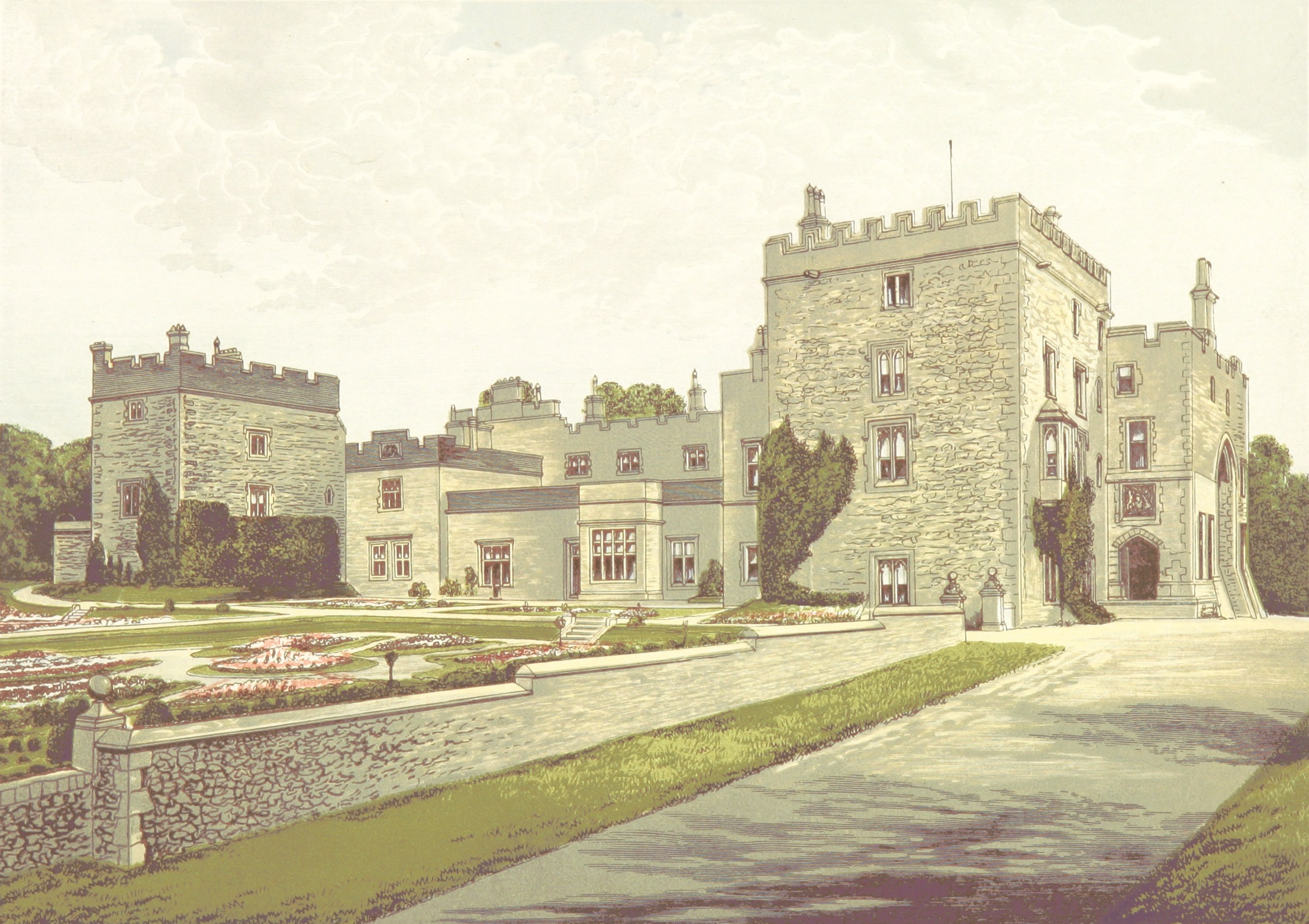
Muncaster Castle circa 1880

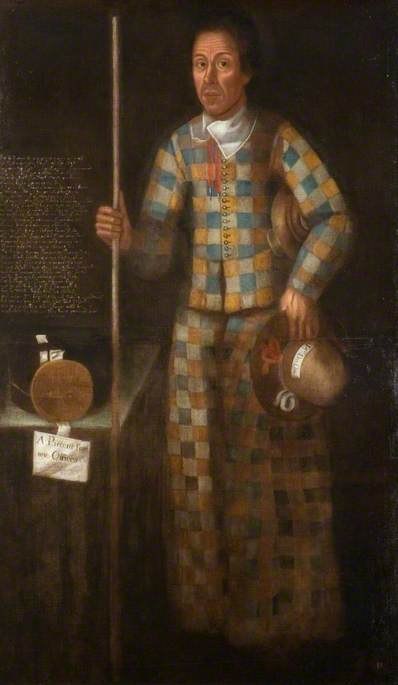
Tom Skelton, jester of Muncaster Castle

The place is now corruptly known as "Muncaster", which first appeared in a Cumberland church register in 1577, the original name according to all old evidence and records being "Mulcaster", registered in the pipe rolls of Cumberland circa 1150 (also as Molecaster and Mulecaster in 1190 and 1236 respectively).

The placename "Muncaster" contains the Latin word castra, meaning "encampment", or "fort". It is suspected that the site of the castle lies on foundations dating to the Roman era, which, if they exist, may represent a castellum for the nearby Roman fort of Glannoventa at Ravenglass.

The Muncaster estate was granted to Alan de Penitone in 1208. The oldest parts of the castle include the Great Hall and the 14th-century pele tower, a type of watch-tower fortification unique to the English-Scottish border region.

Between 1860 and 1866 Anthony Salvin extensively remodelled Muncaster Castle for the Barons Muncaster. Sir John Frecheville Ramsden, 6th Baronet discussed proposed modifications to the castle with Edwin Lutyens from 1916, but nothing came of these; Lutyens did design the Muncaster War Memorial, constructed in 1922, on a commission from Ramsden.

During the Second World War, some 700 works of art from the Tate Gallery were transferred to the castle for safekeeping. They included works by Turner, Manet and Van Gogh.

Muncaster's gardens include features designed to take advantage of views of the Esk Valley and the mountains. There is an aviary containing owls and other raptor birds from Britain and overseas. There are daily flying displays of these birds. There is an indoor maze themed on the life of a field vole.

Muncaster Castle is still owned by the Pennington family, who have lived at Muncaster for at least 800 years, and a family residence. Until her death in 2011, Phyllida Gordon-Duff-Pennington and her husband Patrick Gordon-Duff-Pennington (1930–2021) worked for three decades to restore the castle from a "crumbling relic" and establish it as a place for tourism and events. Since 2021, the owners are Peter and Iona Frost-Pennington, with their elder son, Ewan, acting as the Muncaster's operations director. It now has more than 90,000 visitors a year.

In October 2021, the castle was one of 142 sites across England to receive part of a £35-million injection into the government's Culture Recovery Fund.

== The Luck of Muncaster ==
After the Battle of Hexham in 1464, according to tradition, Henry VI fled to Muncaster Castle where Sir John Pennington sheltered him. Henry gave Sir John a Venetian glass drinking bowl, with a wish: "As long as this bowl remains unriven, Penningtons from Muncaster never shall be driven". The glass, which is still intact, and still at the castle, is now known as "The Luck of Muncaster".

== Tom Skelton ==
A 17th-century jester, Thomas Skelton, was employed by the Penningtons and was reputed by some to be the original 'Tom Fool' and the inspiration for King Lear's fool (although this has been proven to be false). His portrait hangs in the castle, which depicts him holding his will. Legend has it that Skelton was enlisted by Wild Will of Whitbeck to behead a carpenter's son, Dick, a servant at the castle, who was an unwanted suitor of his betrothed, Helwise Pennington, the unmarried daughter of Sir Alan Pennington. He is rumoured to have said, "There, I have hid Dick's head under a heap of shavings; and he will not find that so easily, when he awakes, as he did my shillings." Skelton was also rumored to have given bad directions to travelers he did not like, causing them to fall in quicksand.

== Events ==
Skelton is commemorated in an annual jesting competition held at the castle. The music festival Krankenhaus, organised by Sea Power, is held here. Previous festivals have featured headliners such as Nadine Shah, The Go! Team, Gwenno, Gruff Rhys, Lanterns on the Lake and The Lovely Eggs. Muncaster hosts the Muncaster Castle parkrun 5k every Saturday morning.

== See also ==
- Grade I listed buildings in Cumbria
- Listed buildings in Muncaster
- List of work on castles and country houses by Anthony Salvin
- Luck of Edenhall
- Castles in England
- List of historic houses in England
