= Burnmoor stone circles =

Group of stone circles in Cumbria, England

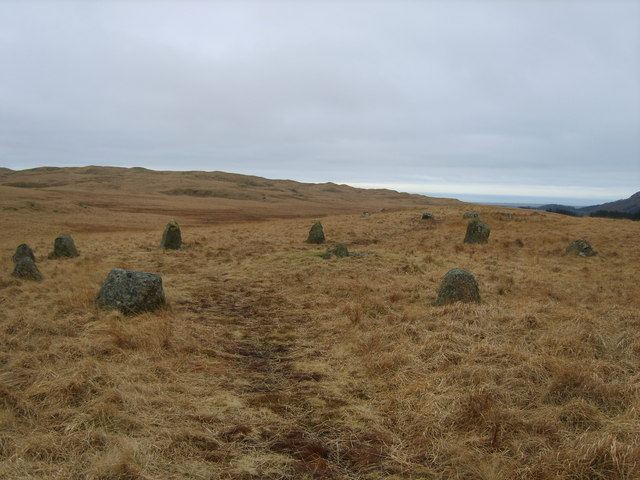
- White Moss stone circles

- Location within Cumbria
- 54.409175°N 3.274325°W
- Type: Stone circles
- Periods: Bronze Age
- Location: Cumbria

History
- Built: c. 2000 BC

The Burnmoor Stone Circles are a group of five different approximately 4,000-year-old stone circles in Cumbria. They are around 1 mile north of the village of Boot, on the slopes of Boat How. The site which covers roughly a square mile is looked after by the National Trust. The largest circle is known as Brat's Hill and there are two nearby pairs of circles known as White Moss and Low Longrigg.

== Brat's Hill stone circle ==
Brat's Hill is the largest stone circle with around 42 stones forming an irregular circle with a diameter of 30 metres. There are five funerary cairns within the circle together with two further stones. There is an outlying stone 10 metres to the northwest of the circle.

== White Moss stone circles ==
About 100 metres to the northwest of Brat's Hill circle lie the two White Moss stone circles. One of them (White Moss North East) measures 16 metres in diameter and has 11 stones forming the circle, while the other (White Moss South West) measures 16.5 metres in diameter and has 14 stones forming the circle. Both stone circles have internal cairns.

== Low Longrigg stone circles ==
About 500 metres to the northwest of Brat's Hill circle lie the two Low Longrigg stone circles. One of them (Low Longrigg North East) measures around 21 metres in diameter, has 15 stones forming an irregular circle, and contains two cairns. The other (Low Longrigg South West) measures 15 metres in diameter, has nine stones forming the circle, and contains a cairn at the centre.

== Gallery ==
Brat's Hill stone circle. The standing stone to the left is near the centre of the circle.

One of the White Moss stone circles

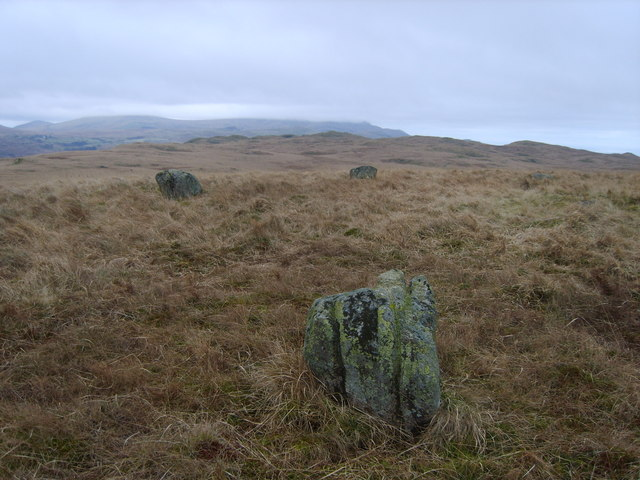
One of the Low Longrigg stone circles
