= River Esk (Ravenglass) =

River in Cumbria, England

Esk
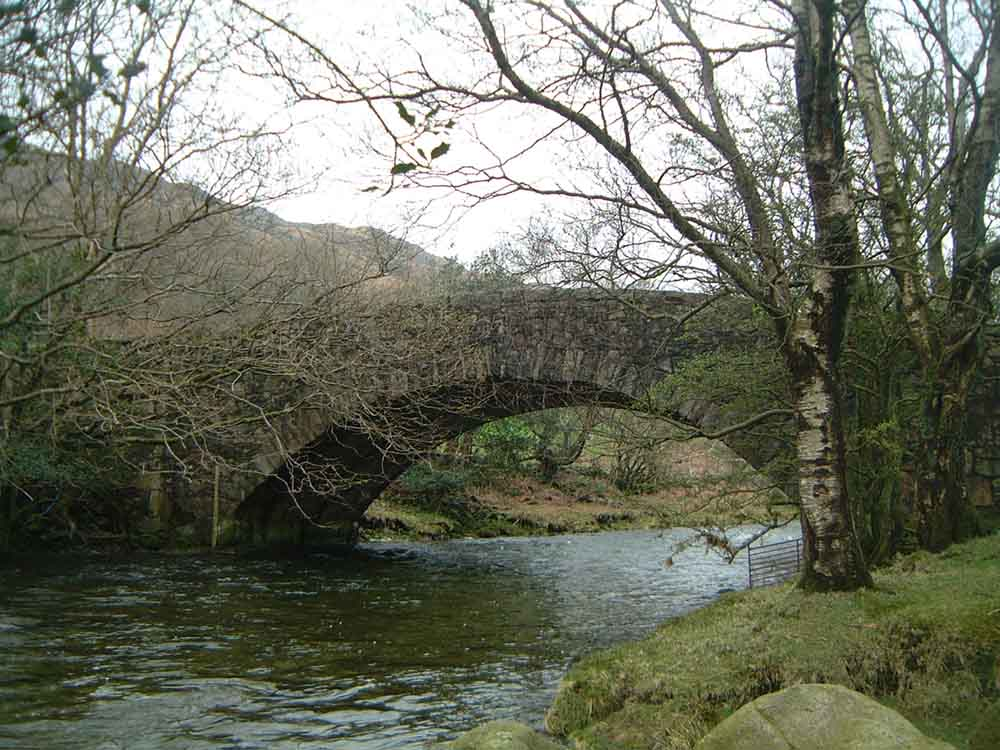
- The River Esk flows under Wha House Bridge in Upper Eskdale

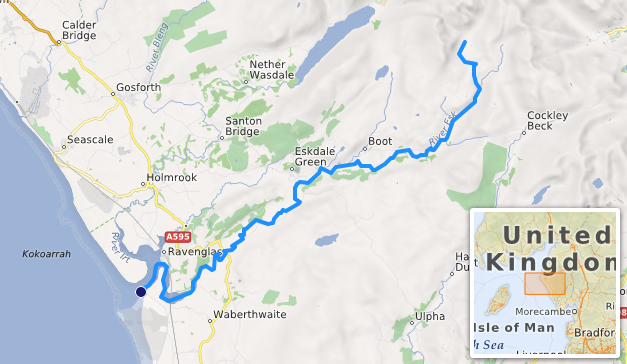
- Path of the River Esk

- Location of the mouth within Cumbria

Location
- Country: United Kingdom
- Constituent country: England
- County: Cumbria

Physical characteristics
- Source
  - location: Esk Hause
  - coordinates: 54°27′40″N 3°11′9″W
  - elevation: 740 metres (2,430 ft)
- Mouth: Irish Sea
  - location: Ravenglass
  - coordinates: 54°20′17″N 3°25′42″W
  - elevation: 0 metres (0 ft)

The River Esk, sometimes called the Cumbrian Esk, is a river in Cumbria, England. It flows for approximately 25 km (15.5 miles) from its source in the Scafells range of mountains to its estuary at Ravenglass. The valley it flows through is known as Eskdale. It is one of two Rivers Esk in Cumbria, and not to be confused with the Border Esk which flows into Cumbria from Scotland.

In his book The Origins Of English Place Names, P. H. Reaney says that the river's name is derived from the Brythonic word *Iska ("abounding in fish") and cognate with the modern Welsh word Pysg ("fishes"). This derivation applies to many similarly named rivers throughout Britain including the Axe, Exe and Usk, the names evolving local distinctions over the centuries.

The Esk is, in part, paralleled by the narrow-gauge Ravenglass and Eskdale Railway and as a consequence the railway has named one of its steam locomotives after the river.

== Course ==
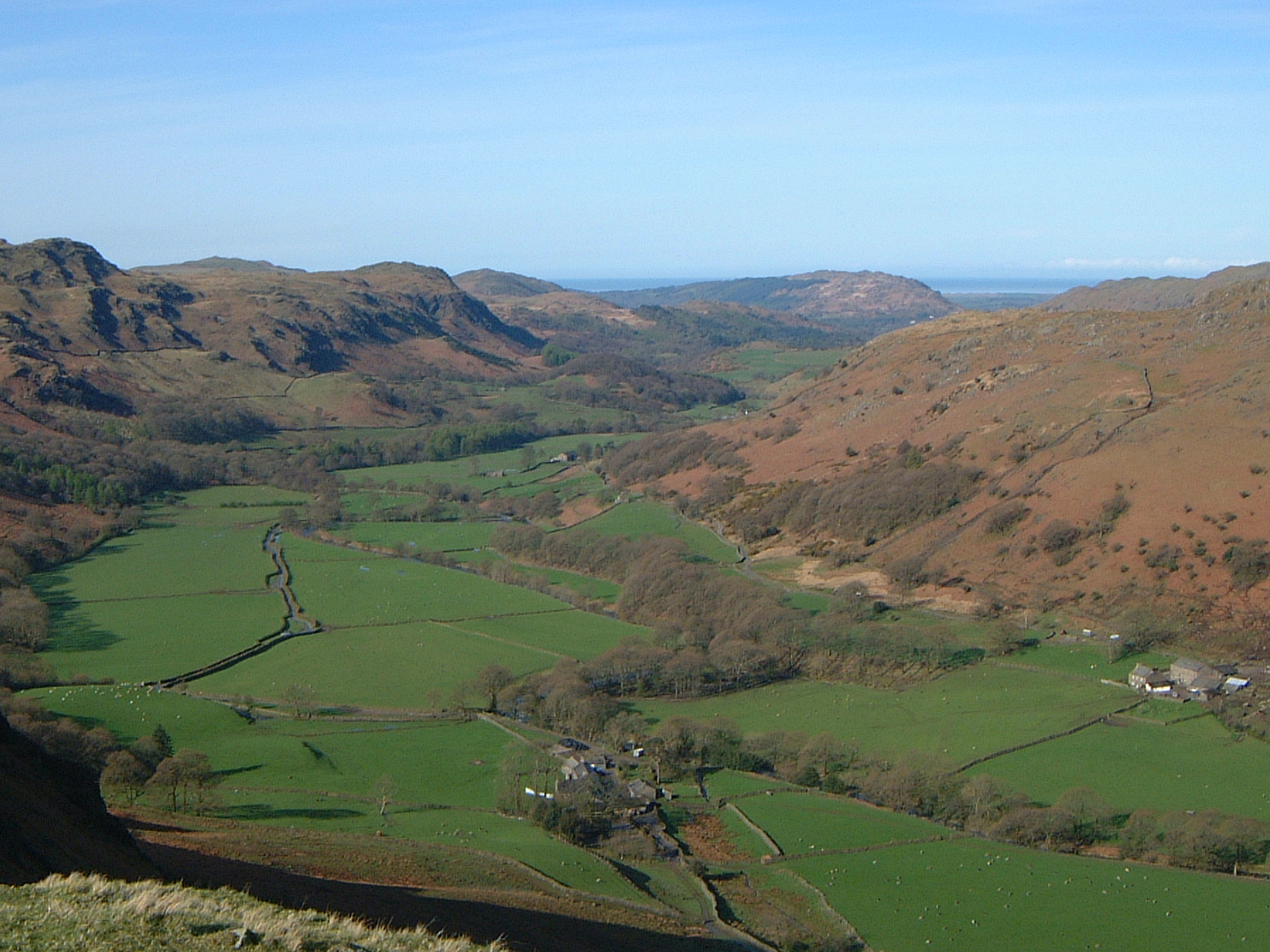
View of Eskdale: the tree-lined Esk enters the bottom right, passing Brotherilkeld Farm and continuing down the valley to the Irish Sea, which can be seen in the far distance.

The Esk rises in the Scafells range of mountains at a height of 740 metres (2,430 ft), just below Esk Hause, the mountain pass between the fells of Great End and Esk Pike. The infant river then flows southerly through wild and picturesque countryside, devoid of any road access. It receives many streams flowing off the Scafell range, the most significant of which are Calfcove Gill and Little Narrowcove Beck. The river makes several leaps over waterfalls including the Esk Falls before being joined by its first major tributary, Lingcove Beck, at Lingcove Bridge.

Some 2.5 kilometres (1.6 mi) downstream of Lingcove Bridge, the river passes Brotherilkeld Farm, which formerly belonged to the monks of Furness Abbey, and the nearby Hardknott Roman Fort. At this point the Esk is joined by the Hardknott Beck, which is accompanied by the motor road that has crossed Hardknott Pass on its route from the central Lake District to the sea. The river now flows westerly through the farmland of Eskdale, roughly paralleled by the road.

A further 4.5 kilometres (2.8 mi) downstream of Brotherilkeld Farm, the church of St Catherine lies on the riverbank. This serves the small village of Boot, although the actual village lies 1 kilometre (0.62 mi) north on the bank of the Whillan Beck. This significant tributary joins the Esk just downstream, at Beckfoot, and is the outflow from Burnmoor Tarn. For about the next 3 kilometres (1.9 mi) the Esk is paralleled by the narrow-gauge Ravenglass and Eskdale Railway, before both the railway and the principal road turn north through the village of Eskdale Green and a route west via the valley of the River Mite.

The river, however, continues in a south westerly direction on the southern side of Muncaster Fell. Here it passes Hinning House bridge, 3 kilometres (1.9 mi) east of Ravenglass where the river becomes tidal, and Muncaster Bridge, where it passes under the A595 coast road and takes on an estuarial character. The estuary then passes the grounds of Muncaster Castle and under the Cumbrian Coast railway line on Eskmeals Viaduct before turning north to reach Ravenglass and the Irish Sea.

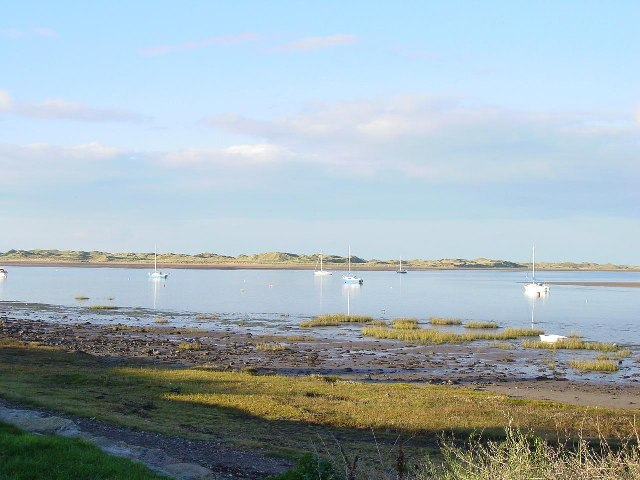
The Esk Estuary at Ravenglass.

At Ravenglass, the Esk estuary is joined by the rivers Irt and Mite. The estuary has evolved over the centuries; the Esk and Irt were earlier separated by a shingle bank formed by the sea, and dunes formed when they eventually joined together. The estuary dunes are the location of the Eskmeals nature reserve, a Site of Special Scientific Interest (SSSI) over an area of 165.5 acres (67 hectares). The SSSI is made up of mostly coastal dunes and salt marsh attracting breeding birds and a profusion of flowers. The dunes are also the site of the Eskmeals Range, a shooting range owned by the MOD and operated by the contractor Qinetiq.

== Ecology ==
The Environment Agency defines three waterbodies for the non-tidal part of the River Esk, including its catchment area and tributaries. The Esk (South West Lakes) waterbody comprises the area up to the confluence with the Whillan Beck, the Esk (upper) comprises the area along the Esk above that confluence, and the Whillan Beck comprises the area along the Whillan Beck above that confluence. In 2022, the Esk (South West Lakes) and Whillan Beck waterbodies were classified as having a good ecological status, whilst Esk (upper) had a moderate ecological status.

The Esk has a reputation as a very good fishing river; it offers fine angling for sea trout and salmon. It was made famous by the writer and broadcaster Hugh Falkus, who lived in the Esk valley and used the river as a basis for many of his books and films. Many of the angling locations on the Esk are privately owned, although the Millom Angling Association offers daily tickets for visitors at its sites on the Muncaster Castle Estate and Brant Rake.

== Topography ==
The valley of the River Esk is notable in being one of few major valleys in the Lake District not to have its own lake, although several tarns are perched above the valley sides. The main access to the valley is from the western end; however, there is also a steep pass with a motor road leading out of the valley to the east over Hardknott Pass, as well as a road with beautiful views leading southwards over Birker Fell to the village of Ulpha in the Duddon Valley.

Alfred Wainwright in his guide Walks from Ratty describes Eskdale as "One of the loveliest of Lakeland's valleys, descends from the highest and wildest mountains in the district to the Sands of Ravenglass in a swift transition from bleak and craggy ridges to verdant woodlands and pastures watered by a charming river." Upper Eskdale is a remote wilderness surrounded by Sca Fell, Scafell Pike, Ill Crag, Esk Pike, Bow Fell and Crinkle Crags; the Woolpack walk takes in this classic horseshoe.

The upper part of the valley lies within the civil parish of Eskdale, whilst the lower part is within the civil parish of Muncaster. Both are within the unitary authority of Cumberland and the ceremonial county of Cumbria.
