= Burnmoor Tarn =

Upland lake in Cumbria, England

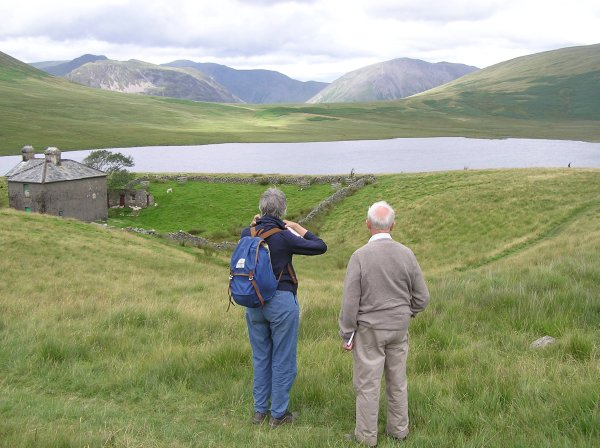
- Overlooking Burnmoor Tarn with Burnmoor Lodge in the foreground.

- Location in the Lake District Location in Copeland Borough
- Location: Lake District
- Coordinates: 54°25′41″N 3°15′34″W
- Primary outflows: Whillan Beck
- Catchment area: 6.02 km^{2} (2.32 sq mi)
- Surface area: 23.9 ha (59 acres)
- Max. depth: 13 m (43 ft)
- Surface elevation: 253 m (830 ft)

Burnmoor Tarn, on Eskdale Fell in Cumbria, England, is the largest entirely natural tarns in the Lake District. Its waters flow into Whillan Beck at the tarn's north-eastern corner, which immediately turns south and flows into Eskdale, joining the Esk at Beckfoot. Burnmoor Lodge, a former fishing lodge, stands by the southern shore and a mediaeval corpse road runs past the eastern shore where it fords the beck. Eskdale Moor or Boat How lies to the south of the tarn.

The tarn is one of the sites in DEFRA's UK Upland Waters Monitoring Network. It occupies 23.9 hectares (59 acres) and lies at an altitude of 253 metres (830 ft) in a moraine hollow on the uplands between Wastwater and Eskdale. The lake has two distinct basins close to the south-eastern shore and a maximum depth of 13 metres (43 ft). There are four main inflow streams to the north and north-west. The outflow at the eastern end joins the Hardrigg Beck which drains the slopes of Scafell and, in times of especially high flow, is partly diverted into the lake across a braided delta.
