= Boat How =

Hill in Lake District, England

- The summit rock outcrop

Highest point
- Elevation: 337 m (1,106 ft)
- Prominence: 79 m (259 ft)
- Parent peak: Illgill Head
- Listing: Outlying Fell, Tump, Birkett, Synge, Fellranger
- Coordinates: 54°25′10″N 3°16′09″W

Geography
- Location within the Lake District
- Location: Lake District, England
- OS grid: NY177034
- Topo map: OS Landranger 89, 90; Outdoor Leisure 6

Boat How or Eskdale Moor is a hill in the English Lake District, near Boot, in Cumberland, Cumbria. It lies south of Burnmoor Tarn, between the River Mite to the west and the Whillan Beck tributary of Eskdale to the east.

It is the subject of a chapter of Wainwright's book The Outlying Fells of Lakeland. It reaches 1,105 feet (337 m) and Wainwright describes an anticlockwise circuit from Boot. He says: "Its proliferation of ancient remains makes it a happy hunting ground for walkers with an eye for relics of days long past", mentioning the presence of four stone circles.

Richards in his Fellranger books names the hill as Eskdale Moor and refers to the summit outcrop as Boat How, but the Database of British and Irish Hills identifies it as Boat How, while classifying it as a Tump, Outlying Fell, Birkett, Synge and Fellranger.

Richards describes ascent routes from Dalegarth railway station, Miterdale Forest or the village of Eskdale Green, and describes the fell as "Tract of fascinating moorland between Miterdale and Eskdale, with tarns and ancient relics".

Historic England uses the name Burnmoor, for an area including Boat How but extending north of Burnmoor Tarn: in its description of "Maiden Castle round cairn, Burnmoor", to the north of the tarn, it describes it as lying "at the northern end of a large area of open moorland known as Burnmoor which contains an abundance of prehistoric remains". There are four scheduled ancient monuments on the fell, described as "Cairnfield including a funerary cairn, standing stone and three stone banks south of Eller How, Burnmoor", "Prehistoric enclosure containing three hut circles and eight clearance cairns and an adjacent hut circle and cairnfield north east of Boat How, Burnmoor", "Prehistoric enclosure containing ten clearance cairns south west of Boat How, Burnmoor" and "Cairnfield including a prehistoric enclosure, 5 stone circles, 10 funerary cairns, 6 stone banks, 2 stone walls, a lynchet and a trackway on Burnmoor" (known as Burnmoor stone circles).
