= Boot, Cumbria =

Village in the English county of Cumbria

Coordinates: 54.3982°N 3.2700°W

Boot
- Village
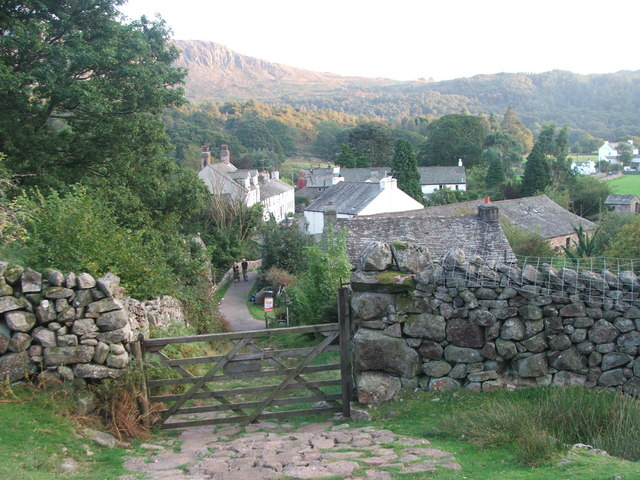
- Boot

- Location in the former Copeland Borough Location within Cumbria
- Population: 15
- OS grid reference: NY1700
- Civil parish: Eskdale
- Unitary authority: Cumberland
- Ceremonial county: Cumbria
- Region: North West
- Country: England
- Sovereign state: United Kingdom
- Post town: HOLMROOK
- Postcode district: CA19
- Dialling code: 019467
- Police: Cumbria
- Fire: Cumbria
- Ambulance: North West
- UK Parliament: Barrow and Furness

Boot is a small village in Eskdale on the western side of the English Lake District. It lies within the civil parish of Eskdale, the unitary authority of Cumberland, and the ceremonial county of Cumbria. The main part of the village lies beside the Whillan Beck, whilst its church, St Catherine's, lies 0.6 miles (0.97 km) to the south on the bank of the River Esk. The Whillan Beck flows into the Esk just downstream of the village.

The village can be approached by two roads, one up the valley from the coast, and the other over the Hardknott and Wrynose passes from the central Lake District. The latter is England's steepest road and is often closed in winter or during icy weather. The Ravenglass and Eskdale Railway, a seasonally operated narrow-gauge steam railway, has its upper terminus at Dalegarth station, some 5 minutes walk from the village.

On the moorland around 1 mile (1.6 km) north of the village are five Bronze Age stone circles known collectively as the Burnmoor stone circles and dating from around 2000 BCE. The remains of the Hardknott Roman Fort are 3 miles (4.8 km) to the east; the fort was occupied for most of the period from the early 2nd to the late 4th centuries.

In the village there is a watermill dating back to 1547 known as Eskdale Corn Mill. Since the 1970s this has been open to the public as a visitor attraction and showcases original working milling machinery driven by two overshot waterwheels. The mill underwent a £1 million refurbishment in 2019 with support from the National Lottery Heritage Fund and Copeland Community Fund.

During the 19th century there was some mining of hematite iron ore at a number of sites around Boot, including at Nab Gill above the village, Ban Garth just to the west and Gill Force on the other side of the Esk. It was these mines that led to the initial construction of the railway, which at that time terminated in the village and was linked to the mines by branches or inclines, but yields proved to be disappointing and all the mines had closed by 1912. Besides the surviving railway, some traces of the mines and connecting railways can be found. The railway is now narrow-gauge and part of the Ravenglass and Eskdale Railway, a major tourist attraction in Eskdale.

The permanent population of Boot is 10–15, but can rise to between 90 and 120 in summer when the local pubs, bed-and-breakfasts and holiday cottages are full. The village has two pubs, The Boot Inn (formerly The Burnmoor Inn) and The Brook House Inn, with The Woolpack Inn (incorporating the Hardknott Bar & Cafe) about a mile towards Hardknott Pass. The Woolpack Inn has an adjoined brewery known as Hardknott Brewery. All these businesses survive on fell walkers (ramblers), the passengers of the railway, and holiday-makers from the nearby campsite and cottages.

On 2 June 2010, Boot became the centre of a search after a shooting spree in Cumbria. The killer, 52-year-old taxi driver Derrick Bird, was found dead in woods near Boot after a four-hour manhunt. He killed 12 people and injured 11 others.

== See also ==
- Listed buildings in Eskdale, Cumbria
