= Whillan Beck =

River in Cumbria, England

- The Whillan Beck at Dalegarth

- Location of the mouth within Cumbria

Location
- Country: United Kingdom
- Constituent country: England
- County: Cumbria

Physical characteristics
- Source: Burnmoor Tarn
  - coordinates: 54°25′49″N 3°15′17″W
  - elevation: 253 metres (830 ft)
- Mouth: River Esk
  - coordinates: 54°23′30″N 3°16′54″W
  - elevation: 40 metres (130 ft)
- Length: 5.5 kilometres (3.4 mi)

The Whillan Beck is a river in the west of the Lake District National Park in the English county of Cumbria. Administratively, the whole of the course of the beck lies in the civil parish of Eskdale and the unitary authority of Cumberland.

The Whillan Beck has its source at an altitude of 253 metres (830 ft) in the outflow from Burnmoor Tarn, a natural tarn that sits at the foot of Scafell. It flows into the River Esk at Beckfoot, near the village of Boot, at an altitude of 40 metres (130 ft). The beck descends 113 metres (371 ft) vertically in a horizontal distance of 5.5 kilometres (3.4 mi). It drains much of the water falling on Scafell, either via the tarn or by a number of streams that join it further downstream, and has a catchment area of 13 square kilometres (5.0 sq mi).

In its lower reaches, the Whillan Beck powers the Eskdale Mill, a grade II* listed corn mill in Boot. It then flows under the track of the narrow gauge Ravenglass and Eskdale Railway just before its Dalegarth terminus, and as a consequence the railway has named one of its steam locomotives after the beck.

The Environment Agency defines a Whillan Beck water body, including its catchment area and tributaries. In 2022, this water body was classified as having a good ecological status.

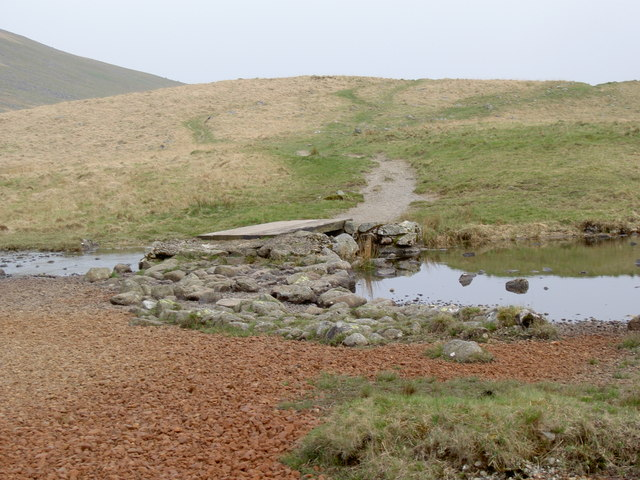
The outflow from the tarn

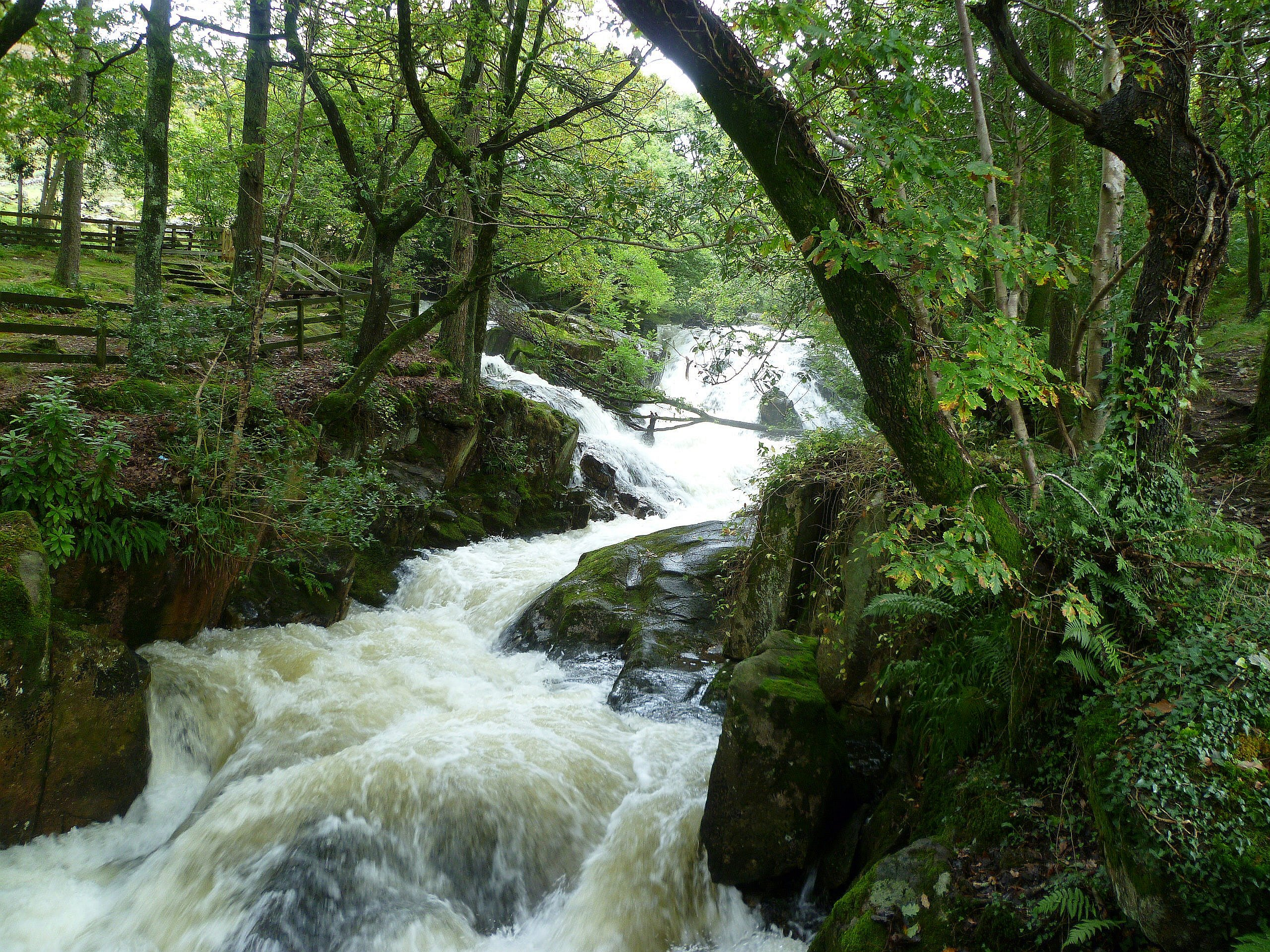
Waterfall above Boot

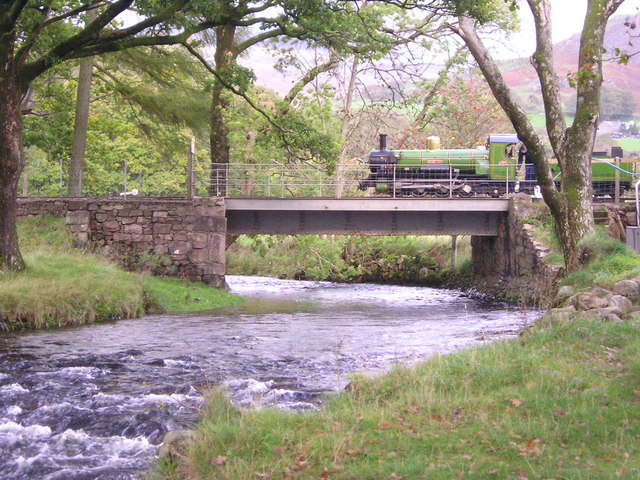
Railway bridge at Dalegarth

At Beckfoot
